= Deaths in October 2026 =

The following is a list of notable deaths in October 2026.

Entries for each day are listed alphabetically by surname. A typical entry lists information in the following sequence:

- Name, age, country of citizenship at birth, subsequent country of citizenship (if applicable), reason for notability, cause of death (if known), and reference.

== October 2026 ==
=== 1 ===
- Alisa Aksyonova, 95, Russian museum director.
- J. Todd Anderson, 67, American storyboard artist (The Big Lebowski, Fargo, The Nice Guys), cancer.
- Bart Batten, 68, American professional wrestler (NWA, WWC, SSW).
- Gilad Ben Shach, 85, Israeli radio program editor (Kol Israel).
- Carl Berger, 87, Canadian historian.
- Jakob Brechbühl, 74, Swiss footballer (Young Boys, national team).
- Del Casher, 88, American guitarist, composer and inventor (wah-wah pedal, Ecco-Fonic), cancer.
- Antônio Roberto Cavuto, 82, Brazilian Roman Catholic prelate, bishop of Itapipoca (2005–2020).
- Simon Bingham, 8th Baron Clanmorris, 88, British aristocrat.
- Göran Djupsund, 73, Finnish political scientist.
- Brooke Eby, 37, American influencer and ALS advocate, complications from amyotrophic lateral sclerosis.
- Melissa Hart, 57, American judge.
- Ken Krawetz, 75, Canadian politician, Saskatchewan MLA (1995–2016).
- Frank Mancuso Sr., 93, American film executive (Paramount Pictures).
- Hilary McPhee, 85, Australian publisher (McPhee Gribble), writer and editor.
- Mario Mestril, 86, Cuban Roman Catholic prelate, auxiliary bishop of Camagüey (1991–1996) and bishop of Ciego de Ávila (1996–2017).
- Oscar Reynert Olsen, 101, Norwegian artist.
- Caupolicán Peña, 96, Chilean football player (Colo-Colo, national team) and manager (Palestino).
- Biljana Plavšić, 96, Bosnian Serb politician and convicted war criminal (Bosnian War), president (1996–1998) and vice president (1992–1996) of Republika Srpska.
- Kamil Pulec, 63, Czech actor.
- Štěpánka Ranošová, 99, Czech actress.
- Lito Sousa, 59, Brazilian aviation specialist, complications from Creutzfeldt–Jakob disease.
- Nobutaka Tsutsui, 81, Japanese politician, MP (1990–1993, 2000–2012).
- Dušan Uhlíř, 88, Czech historian and museum director.
- Mary Louise Weller, 79, American actress (Animal House, Forced Vengeance, Q).
- Milton Windler, 94, American NASA flight director (Apollo 13).
- Don Wing, 88, Australian politician, member (1982–2011) and president (2002–2008) of the Tasmanian Legislative Council.
- Khawaja Zakauddin, 89, Pakistani Olympic field hockey player (1964).
- Karel Zelenko, 101, Slovenian graphic artist and illustrator.

=== 2 ===
- Bruce Baird, 84, Australian politician, MP (1998–2007) and New South Wales MLA (1984–1995).
- Irene Butter, 95, German-American public health scientist (University of Michigan), Holocaust survivor and peace activist.
- Duke Carlisle, 84, American football player (Texas Longhorns), lung cancer.
- Ray Close, 57, Northern Irish boxer.
- Hubert Colin de Verdière, 84, French diplomat, ambassador to Russia (1996–2000), ambassador to Algeria (2000–2002, 2004–2006).
- J. C. Duncan, 97, American politician, member of the South Carolina House of Representatives (1969–1972, 1975–1980).
- Louis Erlo, 97, French stage director (Opéra de Lyon).
- Marjoe Gortner, 82, American actor (Falcon Crest, Earthquake, Starcrash) and evangelist, congestive heart failure.
- Sir William Heseltine, 96, Australian civil servant, private secretary to the sovereign (1986–1990).
- Geoff Hickson, 87, English footballer (Crewe Alexandra, Stoke City).
- Sass Jordan, 65, Canadian singer-songwriter and television talent show judge (Canadian Idol), Juno Award winner (1989).
- Toufique Imrose Khalidi, 59, Bangladeshi journalist, founder of bdnews24.com, brain haemorrhage.
- Clyde Kimball, 84, American politician, member of the Louisiana House of Representatives (1976–1992).
- İoanna Kuçuradi, 89, Turkish philosopher and academic.
- Rodney Muñoz, 60, American costume designer (Jimmy Kimmel Live!), Emmy winner (2010).
- Sudi Özkan, 87, Turkish hotelier and casino operator.
- Matthew Posey, 68, American actor (Places in the Heart, The Magnificent Seven, Love & Death) and director.
- Tony Reno, 52, American college football player (Worcester State Lancers) and coach (Yale Bulldogs, Harvard Crimson), complications from Creutzfeldt–Jakob disease.
- Roy H, 14, American Thoroughbred racehorse, complications from colic.
- Nikos Sevastopoulos, 81, Greek footballer (AEK Athens, Hellenic, Vyzas Megara).
- Mac Steen, 78, American football player (Florida Gators).
- John James Sweeney, 99, American politician, member of the Pennsylvania State Senate (1975–1978).
- Denys Tremblay, 75, Canadian artist and micronational leader, king of L'Anse-Saint-Jean (1997–2000), cancer.
- Jeff Van Note, 80, American football player (Alabama Hawks, Atlanta Falcons).
- Cesar Virata, 95, Filipino economist and politician, prime minister (1981–1986), secretary of finance (1970–1986), and MP (1978–1986).
- Steve Zaiser, 75, American politician, member of the North Dakota House of Representatives (2003–2014).

=== 3 ===
- Vincent M. Battle, 85–86, American diplomat, ambassador to Lebanon (1994, 2001–2004).
- Przemysław Branny, 55, Polish singer and actor.
- Robert X. Cringely, 73, American journalist (InfoWorld).
- Malcolm Edwards, 76, British publisher, editor and critic, complications from Parkinson's disease.
- Moïse Kwasivi Fiadjoe, Togolese gynaecologist.
- Bob Fontaine Jr., 73, American baseball scout (Toronto Blue Jays).
- Wendell P. Gardner, 80, American judge.
- Dafroza Gauthier, 72, Rwandan political activist, cancer.
- Vladimir Gogoladze, 60, Georgian gymnast, Olympic champion (1988).
- Colin Gabelmann, 82, English-born Canadian politician, British Columbia attorney general (1991–1995) and MLA (1972–1975, 1979–1996).
- Leroy Griffith, 94, American theater and strip club owner, and adult film and burlesque producer.
- Cheikh Hamidou Kane, 98, Senegalese writer (L'Aventure ambiguë).
- Betty Harris, 86, American chemist.
- Dennis Hastert, 84, American politician, member (1987–2007) and speaker (1999–2007) of the U.S. House of Representatives.
- Timothy Herbert, 85, British orthopaedic surgeon.
- Bob Hitchcock, 97, American high school football coach.
- Anatoly Kashpirovsky, 87, Ukrainian-born Russian psychotherapist, hypnotist and politician, MP (1993–1995), cardiac arrest.
- Robert Kelker-Kelly, 62, American actor (Days of Our Lives, Another World, General Hospital) and aircraft pilot, coronary artery disease.
- Jan Roelof Kruithof, 89, Dutch speed skater.
- Giovanni Lista, 83, Italian art historian and art critic.
- Henri Maler, 79, French political activist and academic.
- Joël Manglou, 68, French musician.
- Metal Maniac, 62, American professional wrestler (ECW), pancreatic cancer.
- Sergey Mikhalyov, 73, Russian politician, Rostov Oblast MLA (since 2013).
- Lyle Odelein, 58, Canadian ice hockey player (Montreal Canadiens, New Jersey Devils, Columbus Blue Jackets), Stanley Cup champion (1993), heart attack.
- Sidney Offit, 97, American author.
- Palle Rama Rao, 89, Indian scientist.
- Singeetham Srinivasa Rao, 95, Indian film director (Aditya 369, Bhairava Dweepam, Pushpaka Vimana).
- Albert Rueprecht, 97, Austrian actor (The Bird Seller, The Forester of the Silver Wood, Song Without End).
- Toshitsugu Saito, 81, Japanese politician, MP (1986–2009) and director of the Defense Agency (2000–2001), acute myeloid leukemia.
- Mad Sandhu, 29, Indian LGBTQ social media influencer and make-up artist, shot.
- Jim Ray Smith, 94, American football player (Cleveland Browns, Dallas Cowboys).
- Masako Watanabe, 97, Japanese manga artist.
- Hugh Wooldridge, 74, English theatre director, producer and writer.

=== 4 ===
- James M. Adovasio, 82, American archaeologist.
- Ángel Arroyo, 70, Spanish racing cyclist.
- Clément Atangana, 85, Cameroonian magistrate, counsellor of the supreme court (1991–2014).
- Neem Chandra Bhowmik, Bangladeshi physicist and diplomat.
- Bernard Boileau, 67, Belgian tennis player.
- Antoine Ciosi, 94, French singer and composer.
- Robert Corbin, 78, Guyanese politician.
- Gordon Davis, 85, American lawyer and civic leader, parks commissioner of New York City (1978–1983), complications from emphysema.
- Werner Fischer, 95, German crystallographer.
- Devprasad John Ganawa, 74, Indian Roman Catholic prelate, bishop of Jhabua (2009–2012) and Udaipur (since 2012), cardiac arrest.
- Kirill Gasilin, 47, Russian fashion designer.
- Yosef Hagoel, 80, Israeli military officer.
- Dean Hawkes, 87–88, British designer, architect and academic.
- Messan Hilaire Locoh-Donou, Togolese architect and hotelier.
- Callixte Mbarushimana, 63, Rwandan alleged génocidaire.
- Reggie McFadden, 57, American actor and comedian (In Living Color, Def Comedy Jam). (death announced on this date)
- Emil Poklitar, 87, German footballer (BSG Rotation Babelsberg, SC Dynamo Berlin, 1. FC Saarbrücken).
- Prince Waly, 34, French rapper, paraneoplastic pemphigus.
- Anastazja Pustelnik, 76, Polish Roman Catholic nun (Daughters of Divine Charity) and cookbook author, cancer.
- John Rudnicki, 75, American engineer.
- Amund Sjøbrend, 73, Norwegian speed skater, world champion (1974) and Olympic competitor (1976).
- Nelson Toburen, 87, American football player (Green Bay Packers), pancreatic cancer.
- Joseph Yegba Maya, 82, Cameroonian footballer (Marseille, Valenciennes, national team).
- Denys Zacharopoulos, 74, Greek art historian.

=== 5 ===
- Neil Andrew, 82, Australian politician, member (1983–2004) and speaker (1998–2004) of the House of Representatives.
- Jeffrey Archer, Baron Archer of Weston-super-Mare, 86, British politician and author (Kane and Abel, Only Time Will Tell, A Prison Diary), MP (1969–1974) and member of the House of Lords (1992–2024).
- Göksel Arsoy, 90, Turkish actor (Şafak Bekçileri, Gençlik Hülyaları, Şehirdeki Yabancı).
- Jim Bakker, 86, American televangelist (The PTL Club).
- Boualem Boualem, 73, Algerian politician, member of the Council of the Nation (2007–2012), cabinet director of the presidency (since 2023).
- Heidi Burge, 54, American basketball player (Los Angeles Sparks, Washington Mystics), subject of Double Teamed, glioblastoma.
- Fred Claire, 91, American baseball executive, general manager of the Los Angeles Dodgers (1987–1998).
- Ilie Datcu, 89, Romanian footballer (Dinamo București, Fenerbahçe, national team).
- Michel de Guillenchmidt, 85, French civil servant and politician, member of the General Council of Loir-et-Cher (1973–1976).
- Carlos Alberto Dias, 59, Brazilian footballer (Coritiba, Botafogo, national team).
- Tom J. Dugger, 78, American politician, member of the Oklahoma Senate (2016–2024).
- Hans Egloff, 66, Swiss politician, member of the Cantonal Council of Zurich (1995–2011), MP (2011–2019).
- George Fenton, 76, English film and television composer (Gandhi, The Fisher King, Planet Earth).
- Marlene Fuchs, 84, German Olympic shot putter (1968).
- Hélène Hazera, 74, French journalist and transgender rights activist.
- Christine Hellyar, 79, New Zealand artist.
- Matt Howarth, 72, American comic book writer and artist (Those Annoying Post Bros, Savage Henry, Star Crossed), complications following triple bypass surgery.
- Freddie Jackson, 70, American rhythm and blues singer ("You Are My Lady", "Rock Me Tonight (For Old Times Sake)").
- Vlado Jug, 79, Slovenian Olympic ice hockey player (1968).
- Michael Kearns, 76, American actor (Days of Our Lives, Beverly Hills, 90210) and activist (PFLAG).
- Murray De Laine, 90, Australian politician, South Australia MHA (1985–2002).
- Tadeusz Lutak, 109, Polish World War II veteran.
- George Ali Murad Khan, 93, Pakistani monarch, Mir of Khairpur (1947–1954).
- Lena Martell, 86, Scottish singer ("One Day at a Time").
- Sam McDowell, 84, American baseball player (Cleveland Indians, San Francisco Giants, New York Yankees).
- Dennis Meyer, 76, American football player (Pittsburgh Steelers) and coach (Toronto Argonauts).
- Lothar Milde, 91, German discus thrower, Olympic silver medallist (1968).
- Olivier Mourgue, 87, French industrial designer.
- Kalev Mutond, 69, Congolese politician, general manager of the Agence nationale de renseignements (2011–2019).
- Samuel Odoi-Sykes, 98, Ghanaian politician and diplomat, MP (1979–1981).
- William Osorio, 55, Salvadoran footballer (FAS, Isidro Metapán, national team).
- Don Pierce, 89, American Hall of Fame jockey.
- Coke Reed, 86, American mathematician.
- Otto Rössler, 86, German biochemist and physicist.
- Gabriele Sabatini, 50, Italian football player (Pisa, Castelnuovo, Cuneo) and manager.
- Calvin Schofield Jr., 93, American Episcopalian bishop.
- Joseph Sciorra, 71, American cultural historian, heart attack.
- Benon Sevan, 88, Cypriot diplomat, assistant secretary-general in the UN Department of Political Affairs (1992–2005).
- Colin Wilson, 54, New Zealand-born Australian boxer, brain tumour.

=== 6 ===
- Bisera Alikadić, 87, Bosnian poet and author.
- Víctor Hugo Ayala, 92, Colombian bolero singer.
- Dumitru Caraman, 81, Romanian footballer (Farul Constanța, Portul Constanța, Brăila).
- Geoffrey Chard, 96, Australian operatic baritone (English National Opera, Opera Australia).
- Sandra Bolden Cunningham, 76, American politician, member of the New Jersey Senate (2007–2024).
- Paul Ferris, 62, Scottish writer and organised crime figure, subject of The Wee Man.
- Dennis Franchione, 75, American college football coach (TCU Horned Frogs, Alabama Crimson Tide, Texas A&M Aggies), cancer.
- Joseph Mécène Jean-Louis, 77, Haitian judge, justice of the Supreme Court (2011–2021).
- T. Randall Lee, 64, American chemist.
- Juarez Machado, 85, Brazilian painter.
- Ramesh Babaji Maharaj, 87, Indian spiritual teacher.
- Jean Manga Onguéné, 80, Cameroonian footballer (Canon Yaoundé, national team).
- Ila Arab Mehta, 88, Indian writer.
- Richard Morecroft, 70, English-born Australian news anchor (ABC News) and television presenter (Letters and Numbers), assisted suicide.
- James Nelligan, 97, American politician, member of the U.S. House of Representatives (1981–1983).
- Myles O'Connor, 59, Canadian ice hockey player (New Jersey Devils, Mighty Ducks of Anaheim).
- Con Purser, 95, Australian soccer player (national team).
- German Quiles, 87, American politician.
- Eva Marie Saint, 102, American actress (On the Waterfront, North by Northwest, A Hatful of Rain), Oscar winner (1955).
- Hans-Dieter Schmidt, 78, German football manager (SV Meppen, VfB Oldenburg, 1. FC Magdeburg).
- Anwar Shaikh, 80, Pakistani-born American heterodox economist.
- Paul Joseph Stankard, 83, American glassblower.
- Kazuhiko Yamaguchi, 89, Japanese film director (Sister Street Fighter), pneumonia.
- Fusako Yusaki, 89, Japanese-Italian stop-motion animator.
- Jacek Ziober, 60, Polish footballer (ŁKS Łódź, Montpellier, national team).

=== 7 ===
- Carl Abbott, 90, American architect.
- Elmer A. Bietz, 92, American politician, member of the South Dakota Senate (1983–1992).
- Patricia Blevins, 72, American politician, member of the Delaware Senate (1990–2017).
- Klaus Bresser, 90, German journalist and television presenter.
- Patrick Anthony Conmy, 92, American jurist, judge of the U.S. District Court for North Dakota (since 1985).
- Stefania Corna, 35, Italian volleyball player (Volley Bergamo, Club Italia, national team).
- Anny Buchstab Coury, 97, American geologist.
- Frank Dewane, 76, American Roman Catholic prelate, coadjutor bishop (2006–2007) and bishop (2007–2026) of Venice in Florida.
- Curtis Flowers, 56, American wrongfully imprisoned man.
- Jim Knipfel, 61, American novelist, bile duct cancer.
- Miloslav Kopečný, 82, Czech actor (Bony a klid).
- Ray Kolle, 85, Australian television writer (Neighbours, Home and Away, Prisoner).
- Hal Kurtz, 83, American baseball player (Cleveland Indians).
- Saeed-ur-Rahman Azmi Nadvi, 92, Indian Islamic scholar, principal of Darul Uloom Nadwatul Ulama (since 2000).
- Peng Yu, 92, Chinese actress.
- Jean-Pierre Péroncel-Hugoz, 86, French journalist (Le Monde).
- Piero, 81, Italian-born Argentine singer-songwriter.
- Jakub Schwarz Trojan, 99, Czech Protestant theologian.
- Rachid Soualhi, 77, Algerian footballer (MSP Batna, CA Batna, national team).
- Barbara Spinelli, 80, Italian politician, MEP (2014–2019).
- Theodore J. St. Antoine, 97, American lawyer and academic, dean of the University of Michigan Law School (1971–1978).
- Brice Tarvel, 80, French author.
- Virjibhai Thummar, 67, Indian politician, MP (2004–2009) and Gujarat MLA (2017–2022).

=== 8 ===
- Salah Bachir, 71, Lebanese-born Canadian film industry executive and academic administrator, chancellor of OCAD University (since 2017).
- Xosé Manuel Beiras, 90, Spanish politician and Galician nationalist, member of the Parliament of Galicia (1985–2005, 2012–2016).
- Bob Brynildson, 69, American comic book store owner, lung cancer.
- Michael Canavan, 102, Irish salmon industry executive and politician, Northern Ireland MLA (1973–1974).
- Jeff Cannonball, 39, American professional wrestler, complications from amyotrophic lateral sclerosis.
- Keith Christmas, 79, English singer and songwriter, renal cancer.
- Henk Cornelisse, 85, Dutch cyclist, Olympic bronze medalist (1964).
- Tony Fox, 93, Australian rugby union player (national team).
- Cecily Gemmell, 97, English personal secretary (Winston Churchill, Clementine Churchill).
- Andrew Goudie, 81, English geographer.
- Sir John Hannam, 97, British politician, MP (1970–1997).
- Stephen A. Jarislowsky, 101, German-born Canadian investor and philanthropist.
- Stephen Jones, 75, Australian musician (Severed Heads), video artist and writer, injuries sustained in an attack.
- Vladimír Kopecký, 94, Czech painter, graphic artist and glass artist.
- Les Latcham, 83, English footballer (Burnley, Plymouth Argyle, Bradford City).
- Hamid Lounaouci, 71, Algerian politician, deputy (1997–1999), minister of transport (1999–2001).
- L. Ian MacDonald, 78, Canadian writer, broadcaster and diplomat.
- Colin Mackerras, 87, Australian sinologist.
- Abdelghani El Mansouri, 84, Moroccan Olympic footballer (1964).
- Betty McGuire, 100, American actress (Growing Pains, Falcon Crest, Up in Smoke).
- Penny Moor, 75, British tennis player.
- Darragh Nelson, 36, Irish Gaelic footballer (Ballyboden St Enda's, Dublin), sarcoma.
- Nana Patekar, 75, Indian actor (Parinda, Tiranga, Welcome), cardiac arrest.
- Mark Pryor, 59, British-born American author and attorney.
- Stephen A. Schuker, 87, American historian.

=== 9 ===
- Bakir Bayakhunov, 93, Kazakh composer.
- Abdul Muntaquim Chaudhury, 97, Bangladeshi politician, barrister and diplomat.
- António Vitalino Dantas, 84, Portuguese Roman Catholic prelate, auxiliary bishop of Lisbon (1996–1999) and bishop of Beja (1999–2016).
- Mike Ditka, 86, American Hall of Fame football player and coach (Chicago Bears), Super Bowl champion (1986), heart disease.
- Elisabeth Fontan-Binoche, 100, French harpist.
- Jean Geney, 87, French politician, mayor of Étupes (1989–2010), deputy (1993–1997).
- Bobby Gould, 69, Canadian ice hockey player (Washington Capitals, Calgary Flames, Boston Bruins).
- Sven Hirdman, 87, Swedish diplomat.
- Federico l'Olandese Volante, 76, Dutch-born Italian radio host.
- James Lindesay-Bethune, 16th Earl of Lindsay, 70, Scottish hereditary peer, businessman and politician, member of the House of Lords (1989–2026), complications from an aneurysm.
- Lou Yulie, 91, Chinese philosopher.
- Burudi Nabwera, 99, Kenyan politician and diplomat, MP (1988–1992) and ambassador to the United States (1964).
- Ray Nilsson, 87, Australian footballer (Melbourne, Sydney).
- Jacques Proulx, 87, French trade unionist, president of the Union des producteurs agricoles (1981–1993).
- Jim Richards, 90, American basketball coach (Western Kentucky Hilltoppers).
- Alan Thornett, 89, British activist and car worker.
- Eduardo Vilarete, 73, Colombian footballer (Atlético Bucaramanga, Atlético Nacional, national team), cancer.
- Patrice Warrener, 78, French light artist.
- Chris Wickham, 76, British historian (Framing the Early Middle Ages, The Inheritance of Rome) and academic.

=== 10 ===
- Stephen Dow Beckham, 85, American historian.
- Larry Bertlemann, 71, American surfer, complications from a heart attack.
- Rory Bourke, 84, American songwriter and music publisher.
- Jean-Max de Chavigny, 60, French Olympic windsurfer (1996).
- Guruvayur Dorai, 91, Indian percussionist.
- Freddie Foreman, 94, English gangster (Kray twins).
- Wilfredo Gómez, 69, Puerto Rican Hall of Fame WBC super bantamweight (1977–1983), WBC featherweight (1984) and WBA super featherweight (1985–1986) champion boxer.
- Jack Hearn, 103, English judo instructor.
- Sir Donald Insall, 100, British architect (Donald Insall Associates), conservationist and author.
- Pierre Joliot, 94, French biologist, member of the French Academy of Sciences.
- Eusi Kwayana, 101, Guyanese politician, MP (1953, 1986–1990).
- Pierre Lindstedt, 83, Swedish actor (The Emigrants, The New Land, Mysteriet på Greveholm).
- Keven McDonald, 70, American basketball player (Lancaster Red Roses) and lawyer.
- Ellen Meliesie, 63, Dutch Olympic rower (1996), breast cancer.
- Michael W. Rice, 82, American food company executive, chairman of Utz Brands.
- Trevor Ryan, 72, Australian rugby league player (Balmain, Newtown), lung cancer.
- Giuseppe Schifilliti, 88, Italian-American mobster (DeCavalcante crime family).
- Billy Ray Smith, 82, American politician, Kentucky commissioner of agriculture (1996–2004), cancer.
- Telma de Souza, 82, Brazilian politician, MP (1995–2007, 2011) and mayor of Santos (1989–1992), stroke.
- Musa Taimazov, 42, Russian club thrower, Paralympic champion (2020), pyelonephritis.
- Marcellino Taiji Tani, 73, Japanese Roman Catholic prelate, bishop of Saitama (2000–2013).
- Robert Williamson, 88, British-Australian geneticist.
- Bud Zipfel, 87, American baseball player (Washington Senators).
- Sidney Zoltak, 95, Polish-born Canadian Holocaust survivor, author and educator.

=== 11 ===
- Atar Singh Bhadana, 69, Indian politician, member of the Rajasthan Legislative Assembly (2003–2008), beaten.
- Dauda Biu, 62, Nigerian civil servant.
- Jean Borella, 96, French philosopher.
- Giorgio Bracardi, 93, Italian actor (Banana Joe, La portiera nuda, Being Twenty) and comedian, complications from a broken femur.
- Juan Pablo Cárdenas Squella, 76, Chilean journalist, cancer.
- Joan M. Clark, 104, American diplomat, ambassador to Malta (1979–1981).
- Keith Ellis, 90, English footballer (Sheffield Wednesday, Cardiff City, Scunthorpe United).
- Che Hongcai, 90, Chinese linguist and lexicographer.
- Wilma De Angelis, 96, Italian singer ("Nessuno").
- Tony Forsberg, 93, Swedish cinematographer (Sunday's Children, Lovely Is the Summer Night, In the Presence of a Clown).
- Grant Heiken, 84, American volcanologist, mesothelioma.
- Ralph Hosack, 90, Canadian Olympic boxer (1956).
- Nasima Khan, 82, Bangladeshi actress (The Day Shall Dawn, Dui Duari, Kusum Kusum Prem).
- Doug Loft, 39, English footballer (Port Vale, Gillingham, Brighton & Hove Albion).
- Jean-Luc Mongrain, 75, Canadian journalist, cancer.
- Gabriel Prieto, 65, Chilean actor.
- Rachna Shroff, 47, American oncologist, adenocarcinoma.
- Cheryl Smith, 56, New Zealand rugby union player (national team) and coach, world champion (1998, 2002), bowel cancer.
- Jiří Štěpnička, 79, Czech actor (In the Shadow, Okres na severu, Pasáček z doliny).
- Peter Thomas, 53, Australian political theorist and academic, heart attack.
- Tom's d'Etat, 13, American Thoroughbred racehorse. (death announced on this date)
- Hiroshi Tsuchida, 54, Japanese actor (Ninja Sentai Kakuranger, Attack on Titan, Soulcalibur III), heart failure.
- Erlinda Villalobos, 84, Filipino actress.

=== 12 ===
- Roger Cooreman, 85, Belgian racing cyclist.
- Sarah Dambanevana, 36, Zimbabwean cricketer (national team) and umpire.
- Sheana Davis, 57, American cheesemaker.
- Raul Daza, 91, Filipino politician, governor of Northern Samar (2001–2010), deputy speaker (1992–1998) and four-time member of the House of Representatives.
- Jean-Paul Defrang, 70, Luxembourgish footballer (Jeunesse Esch, Progrès Niederkorn, national team). (death announced on this date)
- Zaynolabideen Ghorbani, 93, Iranian ayatollah, MP (1984–1988) and member of the Assembly of Experts (1990–2024).
- Jeffrey Goldstone, 93, British theoretical physicist.
- Richard Gray, 68, American video game designer (Duke Nukem 3D, Sin, Quake).
- Madhu Kambikar, 73, Indian actress (Bin Kamacha Navra, Ek Hota Vidushak, Jagannath), complications from a stroke.
- Paul Kimelman, 79, American weight loss world record holder.
- Andy King, 78, British politician, MP (1997–2005).
- Gerry Kowalsky, 104, Canadian automobile salesman.
- Liu Changcheng, 62, Chinese Olympic volleyball player (1984).
- Irene Mathyssen, 75, Canadian politician, MP (2006–2019), cancer.
- RJ Mitte, 34, American actor (Breaking Bad, Switched at Birth, The Guardians of Justice), suicide.
- John Mocatta, 90, English cricketer (Oxford University).
- Noah Musingku, 61–62, Papua New Guinean confidence trickster and fugitive.
- Rolf Nyhus, 84, Norwegian football referee.
- Lucian Piane, 46, American music producer ("Bale Out") and composer (RuPaul's Drag Race, Sorority Row), traffic collision.
- Kuroi Senji, 94, Japanese writer, pneumonia.
- René-Pierre Signé, 96, French politician, mayor of Château-Chinon (1981–2008), senator (1986–2011).
- Wayne Steeves, 81, Canadian politician, New Brunswick MLA (1999–2014).
- Vladimir Vuletić, 47, Serbian lawyer. (body discovered on this date)
- Gary Waddell, 74, Australian actor (Chopper, The Proposition, The King Is Dead!).
- Malcolm H. Wiener, 91, American prehistorian and lawyer.

=== 13 ===
- Salah Uddin Ahmed, 80, Bangladeshi politician, MP (1991–1996, 2001–2006).
- John Angus, 83, Canadian politician, Manitoba MLA (1988–1990).
- Pavel Anton, 90, Moldovan composer.
- Martina Arroyo, 90, American operatic soprano (Metropolitan Opera) and academic voice teacher.
- Helen Branswell, 69, Canadian infectious diseases and medical reporter (The Canadian Press, Stat News), cancer.
- Guy Conti, 84, American baseball coach (New York Mets).
- Ken Friar, 92, English football executive, president of Arsenal (since 2020).
- Angelo Groppelli, 80, Italian shot putter.
- Albert Houssiau, 101, Belgian Roman Catholic prelate, bishop of Liège (1986–2001).
- Carlos Eduardo Jaramillo Castillo, 94, Ecuadorian poet.
- Parvinder Singh Jhota, 42, Indian anti-drugs activist and kabaddi player, shot.
- Pat Karney, 78, Irish-born British politician.
- Jack Kirksey, 97, American politician, member of the Michigan House of Representatives (1977–1984) and mayor of Livonia (1995–2003, 2008–2015).
- Anthony A. Less, 89, American vice admiral (United States Navy).
- Heikki Mälkiä, 68, Finnish ice hockey player (SaiPa, JYP) and coach (Ilves).
- Alan Mandell, 98, Canadian-American actor (A Serious Man, Velvet Buzzsaw, 79 Park Avenue).
- Perry Mehrling, 67, American economist.
- María Asunción Milá, 107, Spanish human rights activist.
- Peter Nagy, 67, American artist.
- Netinho, 60, Brazilian singer, non-Hodgkin lymphoma.
- Bernard Pagès, 86, French sculptor.
- A. V. S. Raju, 89, Indian industrialist.
- Kasey Redfern, 35, American football player (Detroit Lions, Atlanta Falcons, Dallas Cowboys), brain cancer and CNS lymphoma.
- Dorothy Saxe, 100, American philanthropist and art collector.
- Craig L. Symonds, 79, American naval historian, cancer.

=== 14 ===
- Alpay, 91, Turkish singer.
- Louis Appignani, 93, American philanthropist.
- Thomas H. Buxton, 86, American academic.
- Jorge Castro, 59, Argentine WBA middleweight champion boxer (1994–1995).
- Michael Cremo, 78, American pseudoarcheologist (Forbidden Archeology).
- Vin Denson, 90, English road racing cyclist.
- Asbjørn Eide, 93, Norwegian human rights scholar.
- Michael Forest, 97, American actor (Beast from Haunted Cave, Star Trek, Atlas).
- Charmienne Harker, 102, American actress (Death Valley Days, Angel Face, Abbott and Costello in the Foreign Legion).
- André Ledran, 93, French politician.
- Stefan Lord, 71, Swedish darts player.
- Ana Lupez, 82, Argentine dancer and choreographer, heart cancer.
- Luigi Malice, 89, Italian painter.
- Bob Morris, Papua New Guinean football manager (national team).
- Gamal Nkrumah, 68, Ghanaian journalist (Al-Ahram Weekly).
- Cheruvayal Raman, 74, Indian tribal farmer.
- Sanjulián, 85, Spanish cartoonist.
- Gerold Späth, 86, Swiss author, poet and writer.
- Gerald Stebelton, 87, American politician, member of the Ohio House of Representatives (2007–2014), complications from Parkinson's disease.
- Rita Vorperian, 88, Syrian-born American literary scholar and philanthropist, executive director of the Armenian Relief Society (1998–2005).

=== 15 ===
- Myron Augsburger, 97, American pastor and theologian.
- Gregg Boddy, 77, Canadian ice hockey player (Vancouver Canucks, San Diego Mariners, Edmonton Oilers).
- Alan Brown, 90, English cricketer (Kent, national team), cancer.
- Jorge Dubanced, 76, Argentine football player (Santiago Wanderers, Colo-Colo) and manager (Excursionistas).
- Dominic J. Elioff, 95, American politician, member of the Minnesota House of Representatives (1979–1987).
- Cliff Hagan, 94, American Hall of Fame basketball player (Kentucky Wildcats, St. Louis Hawks), NBA champion (1958).
- Md. Abdul Hai, 77, Bangladeshi politician, MP (1979–1982, 1991–2006).
- Basil Ince, 93, Trinidadian sprinter and politician, minister of foreign affairs (1981–1985).
- Barbara Jay, 94, British jazz singer, complications from dementia.
- Bo Johansson, 83, Swedish football manager (Silkeborg IF, Östers IF, Denmark national team).
- Pierre-André Kombila, 85, Gabonese politician, MP (1990–1996, 2006–2011).
- Rudolf Křesťan, 83, Czech writer, magazine editor (Mladý svět) and feuilletonist.
- Pirouz Mojtahedzadeh, 80, Iranian political scientist and historian.
- Jon Morris, 84, American football player (New England Patriots, Detroit Lions, Chicago Bears).
- Germán Quintero, 72, Colombian actor (Pablo Escobar, The Drug Lord, Pasión de Gavilanes, Rojo carmesí).
- Richard Riehle, 78, American actor (Office Space, Grounded for Life, Casino), stroke.
- Eli Rygg, 71, Norwegian television presenter and children's writer.
- Gilman Shattuck, 99, American politician, member of the New Hampshire House of Representatives (2005–2010, 2012–2016).
- Tommy R. Smith, 75, American politician, member of the Georgia House of Representatives (1978–2012).
- Mohammad Solaiman, 70, Bangladeshi academic administrator, vice-chancellor of the UITS (2016–2022) and the USTC (since 2017), complications from diabetes and heart disease.
- Danny Watson, 73, New Zealand television presenter (Spot On, What Now) and radio broadcaster (Newstalk ZB), heart disease.
- Tom Yandle, 90, British farmer and huntsman, High Sheriff of Somerset (1999).

=== 16 ===
- Noah Adams, 84, American radio journalist (NPR).
- Hyron Andrews, 31, South African rugby union player (Lions, Sharks), aortic dissection.
- Jack Berry, 95, American sportswriter (The Detroit News), complications from a fall.
- Douglas Dunn, 83, Scottish poet, academic and critic.
- Barbara Gawryluk, 69, Polish children's author, journalist and translator.
- Michael Gray, 75, American actor (Shazam!, The Brian Keith Show, Archer).
- Richard E. Holmes, 82, American civil rights activist.
- P. Inman, 79, American poet.
- Chiaki Ishii, 85, Japanese-born Brazilian judoka, Olympic bronze medallist (1972).
- J. Peter Kincaid, 84, American scientist and educator.
- Dariusz Kołodziejczyk, 64, Polish historian and professor (University of Warsaw).
- Joaquim Letria, 82, Portuguese journalist (Tal & Qual).
- Li Kou-tin, 87, Taiwanese table tennis player.
- Medaglia d'Oro, 27, American Thoroughbred racehorse and sire.
- Vítor Murta, 50, Portuguese sports executive, president of Boavista (2018–2025), heart attack.
- Sam Noto, 96, American jazz trumpeter.
- Jacqueline Van Quaille, 90, Belgian soprano (Ghent Opera) and academic teacher (Royal Conservatory of Ghent).
- Joe Redner, 86, American strip club owner.
- Sharon Sites Adams, 96, American sailor.
- Mariusz Strzałka, 67, Polish fencer, Olympic silver medallist (1980).
- Walter J. Tomasch, 96, American physicist.
- Yiorgos Vardinogiannis, 89, Greek shipping industry and football executive, president of Panathinaikos (1979–2000).
- Rinze Visser, 87, Dutch politician, chronic obstructive pulmonary disease.

=== 17 ===
- Sabri Anar, 60, Turkish Chaldean Catholic hierarch, archbishop of Amida (since 2023).
- John Beake, 87, American football coach (Kansas City Chiefs, New Orleans Saints) and executive (Denver Broncos).
- Yvette Biro, 96, Hungarian-American screenwriter (Johanna, Tender Son: The Frankenstein Project).
- Denis Boytsov, 40, Russian boxer, detached blood clot.
- Jacques Charlin, 77, French mathematician.
- Michael Cheng, 88, Hong Kong politician, MLC (1988–1991).
- Pierre-Yves Collombat, 81, French politician, senator (2004–2020).
- Alan Cribb, 101, Australian botanist.
- Louis-André Dacoury-Tabley, 81, Ivorian politician.
- Patrick Dele-Cole, 86, Nigerian politician, journalist (Daily Times) and historian.
- Tom DeSimone, 87, American film director (Chatterbox, Hell Night, The Concrete Jungle), writer and producer.
- Deva, 75, Indian film composer (Manasukketha Maharasa, Vaigasi Poranthachu, Annaamalai), cardiac arrest.
- Per Haftorsen, 79, Norwegian footballer (Haugar, Fredrikstad, national team).
- Raymond Heard, 90, South African-born Canadian journalist.
- Marianne Helms, 90, German musicologist.
- Janet Jackel, 79, American optical engineer.
- Ota Jirák, 77, Czech actor, voice actor and comedian.
- Clara Joana, 85, Portuguese actress (A Ilha dos Amores).
- Samuel S. Kim, 91, American political scientist and writer.
- Robert S. Knox, 95, American physicist.
- Michèle Magny, 82, Canadian actress (Don't Let the Angels Fall, The Disappearance), playwright and theatre director (Who's Afraid of Virginia Woolf?).
- Ryū Murakami, 74, Japanese novelist (Almost Transparent Blue, Audition, In the Miso Soup).
- Leonel Nunes, 76, Portuguese politician, member of the Legislative Assembly of Madeira (1996–2011).
- Penehupifo Pohamba, 78, Namibian first lady (2005–2015).
- Abdulaziz Al-Shahrani, 31, Saudi Arabian footballer (Damac, Al-Diriyah), traffic collision.
- Juan Francisco Solórzano Foppa, 43, Guatemalan public prosecutor and anticorruption activist, shot.
- Maarten Spanjer, 73, Dutch actor (Spetters, Kameleon 2, All Things Pass) and writer, prostate cancer.
- Eduardo Viana, 71, Portuguese actor.

=== 18 ===
- James P. Axiotis, 63, Greek-born American television producer (Cold Case Files).
- Lua Blanco, 39, Brazilian actress (Rebelde, Soulbound) and singer (Rebeldes), intestinal cancer.
- Napoleon Bonaparte, 60, Indonesian police officer.
- Michael Brambell, 94, British zoologist.
- Robert Christopherson, 90, American Olympic boxer (1964).
- Benito di Paula, 84, Brazilian singer-songwriter ("Charlie Brown"), prostate cancer.
- Henry Dougier, 90, French publisher.
- Mary Fell, 79, American poet, complications from Alzheimer's disease.
- Frans Geysen, 90, Belgian music composer.
- Gary Heffern, 72, Finnish-American punk rock singer (The Penetrators). (body discovered on this date)
- Larry Hibbard, 81, American politician, member of the Kansas House of Representatives (2013–2019).
- Jost Hochuli, 93, Swiss graphic designer.
- Ann Hornaday, 66, American film critic (The Washington Post), glioblastoma.
- Gregory Ibe, 62, Nigerian industrialist, politician and academic, founder of Gregory University.
- B. Madhusoodhana Kurup, 71, Indian fisheries researcher and academic administrator, vice-chancellor of KUFOS (since 2010).
- Ronald Lancaster, 95, British Anglican clergyman, chemist and fireworks industry executive, founder of Kimbolton Fireworks.
- Lee Kwan-Young, 80, South Korean taekwondo practitioner.
- Ng Hong-mun, 100, Hong Kong educator and politician, deputy to NPC (1975–2008).
- Inger Nordal, 82, Norwegian botanist and academic.
- Ana Rita Sithole, 70, Mozambican politician, MP (1994–2004).
- Ibrahima Sory Sow, 85, Guinean politician, member of the National Assembly of Guinea (1995–2002).
- Ken Ward, 91, Australian footballer (Richmond).

=== 19 ===
- Chuck Amato, 80, American college football player (NC State) and coach (NC State, Florida State), throat cancer.
- Kenneth Atchity, 82, American film producer (The Meg, Life or Something Like It, Amityville 4: The Evil Escapes).
- Ediémou Blin Jacob, 80, Ivorian pastor and civil servant.
- Alexandre Chorin, 88, Polish-born American mathematician.
- Florin Cotora, 53, Romanian footballer (Inter Sibiu, Apulum Alba Iulia).
- Tom Daniel, 89, American automobile stylist.
- Vladlens Dozorcevs, 87, Russian-Latvian politician, member of the Supreme Council (1990–1993) and MP (1995–1998).
- Frank Goode, 86, Australian football player (North Melbourne) and coach (Footscray).
- Antonio Grimau, 82, Argentine actor (Herederos de una venganza, Ricos y Famosos, La obertura).
- Sir Michael Hobbs, 89, British army officer.
- Coos Huijsen, 87, Dutch historian, writer and politician, member of the House of Representatives (1972, 1976–1977).
- Hilkka Kinnunen, 101, Finnish soprano, actress (Song of Warsaw, April's Coming), and theatre director.
- Demetris Kizas, 73, Cypriot footballer (Enosis Neon Paralimni, Panathinaikos, Panachaiki).
- Yusef Majidzadeh, 90, Iranian archaeologist.
- Caryle Murphy, 79, American journalist (The Washington Post), pulmonary fibrosis.
- Karthik Sabesh, 37, Indian actor (Vallavan, Kulir 100°, Pattathu Yaanai).
- Subagyo Hadi Siswoyo, 80, Indonesian Army general, Army Chief of Staff (1998–1999).
- Timothy Smiley, 95, British philosopher.
- Carlos Miguel Suárez, 67, Mexican actor (Dos mujeres, un camino, Tú y yo).
- Mária Szolnoki, 79, Hungarian fencer, Olympic silver medallist (1972).
- Geoff Thompson, 86, New Zealand politician, MP (1978–1984).
- Emmanuel Uduaghan, 71, Nigerian politician, governor of Delta State (2007–2015).
- Mr. Whitekeys, 79, American musician.

=== 20 ===
- Allen Bailey, 37, American football player (Kansas City Chiefs, Atlanta Falcons).
- Paul Barril, 80, French military officer.
- Brother Valentino, 85, Trinidadian Calypso musician.
- Gordon Cheng, 64–65, Australian Anglican cleric and Christian writer.
- Julio Dalmao, 86, Uruguayan footballer (Nacional, Vélez Sarsfield, national team).
- Early Voting, 7, American Thoroughbred racehorse, euthanized. (death announced on this date)
- Bram van Erkel, 94, Dutch television director (Q & Q).
- Sandy Frank, 97, American television producer (Name That Tune, Battle of the Planets).
- Oleg Garin, 60, Russian football player (Okean Nakhodka, Lokomotiv Moscow) and manager (Dynamo Bryansk). (death announced on this date)
- John M. Geddes, 74, American journalist and editor (The New York Times), lung disease.
- Kalju Kruusa, 53, Estonian poet, editor and translator.
- Sergey Kucherov, 46, Russian Olympic track cyclist (2008, 2012).
- Georgios Liveris, 94, Greek Olympic sports shooter (1960).
- Michael Joseph Melloy, 78, American jurist, judge of the Northern District of Iowa (1992–2002) and Court of Appeals for the Eighth Circuit (since 2002), cancer.
- Rajaa Mohammed, 64, Kuwaiti actress.
- Eva Ngigi–Sarwari, 45, Kenyan financial services executive.
- Manuel Otto, 30, German computer game developer, burn injuries.
- Sir Philip Otton, 93, British judge, lord justice of appeal (1995–2001).
- Alex Sanders, 88, American jurist, politician and academic administrator.
- Isaak Sigal, 99, Ukrainian scientist.
- Russell Stone, 103, New Zealand historian, author and academic.
- Barry Swallow, 84, English footballer (York City, Barnsley, Bradford City).
- Harry Tsuchidana, 94, American painter.

=== 21 ===
- John Anderson, 71, American Hall of Fame country singer ("Wild and Blue") and songwriter ("Swingin'", "Seminole Wind").
- Şahan Arzruni, 83, Armenian-Turkish pianist, composer and lecturer.
- Keith Bailey, 65, Canadian soccer player (Tampa Bay Rowdies, Bradford City).
- Todd Benzinger, 63, American baseball player (Boston Red Sox, Cincinnati Reds), World Series champion (1990).
- Mélanie Berger-Volle, 105, Austrian-born French World War II resistance fighter.
- Dan Davis, 84, American radio broadcaster (ESPN).
- Jozef Deleu, 89, Belgian writer.
- Dave DeWitt, 82, American food historian.
- Cornell Green, 86, American football player (Dallas Cowboys).
- Clint Hackney, 74, American politician, member of the Texas House of Representatives (1980–1988).
- Romano Hummel, 27, Dutch speedway rider (Berwick Bandits), suicide.
- Nikolay Koshman, 82, Russian politician, deputy prime minister (1999–2000).
- Elena Maganini, 70, American film and television editor (Dexter, Henry: Portrait of a Serial Killer, Wild Things), breast cancer.
- David Mouradian, 74, Armenian philologist, writer and film critic.
- Georgi Nemsadze, 54, Georgian footballer (Dinamo Tbilisi, Dundee, national team), heart attack.
- Ng Joo Pong, 80, Malaysian Olympic cyclist (1964, 1968).
- Kevin O'Neill, 89, Northern Irish Gaelic footballer (John Mitchel GFC, UCD GAA, Down).
- Ken Ring, 81, British-born New Zealand writer, astrologer and weather forecaster.
- Alexander Sizov, 78, Russian politician, MP (2000–2007). (death announced on this date)
- Tom Skerritt, 93, American actor (Alien, Picket Fences, M*A*S*H), Emmy winner (1993).
- Ronald Tétrault, 90, Canadian politician, Quebec MNA (1970–1973).
- William J. Thorn, 96, American football, cross country and track coach.
- Bob "Hoolihan" Wells, 93, American weatherman, media host (The Hoolihan and Big Chuck Show) and actor (Summer Rental, Ghetto Freaks), liver cancer.

=== 22 ===
- Tetsuya Chiba, 87, Japanese manga artist (Ashita no Joe).
- Claude Cohen-Tannoudji, 93, French physicist (Quantum Mechanics, Sisyphus cooling), Nobel Prize laureate (1997).
- Ron Duguay, 69, Canadian ice hockey player (New York Rangers, Detroit Red Wings, Los Angeles Kings), colon cancer.
- Ricardo Durán, 88, Argentine Olympic rower (1964).
- Kwame Dzokoto, 51, Ghanaian comedian, actor and television host.
- Yasuo Fukuda, 90, Japanese politician, prime minister (2007–2008), chief cabinet secretary (2000–2004), and MP (1990–2012), heart failure.
- Richard Green, 58, English footballer (Shrewsbury Town, Gillingham, Northampton Town).
- Peter Horton, 81, English-born Australian rugby union player (Australia national team).
- Toya Jones, 49, American football player (BC Lions, Birmingham Thunderbolts), complications from a heart attack.
- Arvid Kramer, 70, American basketball player (Anchorage Northern Knights, Denver Nuggets, Telekom Baskets Bonn).
- Krishnaraj, 74, Indian playback singer (Kadhal Kottai, Porkkaalam).
- Arlene Lesewski, 90, American politician, member of the Minnesota Senate (1993–2002).
- Gnénéma Coulibaly Mamadou, Ivorian politician, minister of justice (2012–2017).
- Leaname Maotoanong, 35, Botswanan Olympic sprinter (2016).
- Jaume Pont, 79, Spanish poet, literary critic and academic.
- Thayer Scudder, 96, American anthropologist.
- Marilyn Slaby, 86, American politician, member of the Ohio House of Representatives (2004, 2012–2018).
- Yury Tsyhalka, 43, Belarusian footballer (Shakhtyor Soligorsk, Dinamo Minsk, national team).
- John Vaughan, 62, English football player (Cambridge United, Preston North End) and coach (Bradford City).
- Jorge Veras, 67, Brazilian footballer (Criciúma, Grêmio), pancreatic cancer.
- George D. Watkins, 102, American physicist.
- Bill Wolverton, 94, American scientist.
- Donald Wood-Smith, 95, Australian-American plastic surgeon.

=== 23 ===
- Ion Bașa, 82, Romanian ice hockey player (SC Csíkszereda, Dinamo București, 1968 Olympics). (death announced on this date)
- Judith Blegen, 85, American soprano.
- Virginio Bressanelli, 84, Argentine Roman Catholic prelate, bishop of Comodoro Rivadavia (2005–2010), coadjutor bishop (2010–2011) and bishop (2011–2017) of Neuquén, stroke.
- Dale Brown, 90, American Hall of Fame college basketball coach (LSU Tigers).
- Mathew J. Burrows, 73, American intelligence expert. (death announced on this date)
- Audrey Butt Colson, 100, British social anthropologist.
- Albert Childs, 96, English footballer (Liverpool).
- Lorn Cowie, Lord Cowie, 100, Scottish rugby union player (West of Scotland, national team) and jurist, senator of the College of Justice (1977–1994).
- Josef Duchač, 88, German politician, minister-president of Thuringia (1990–1992).
- Francis Duru, 57, Nigerian actor (Blood Money, Merry Men: The Real Yoruba Demons, Blood Vessel).
- Alan Dysert, 75, American actor (All My Children), cancer.
- Hermann A. Grunder, 94, Swiss-born American physicist.
- Daniel Guice Jr., 73, American politician, member of the Mississippi House of Representatives (1984–2008).
- Bruce Hannah, 85, American industrial designer, cancer.
- Jean-Paul Huchon, 80, French politician, president of the Regional Council of Île-de-France (1998–2015), cancer.
- Asim Kurjak, 84, Bosnian medical doctor.
- Wm. Roger Louis, 90, American historian.
- Dónal Lunny, 79, Irish folk musician (Planxty, The Bothy Band, Moving Hearts).
- Lawrence McCutcheon, 76, American football player (Los Angeles Rams, Denver Broncos, Seattle Seahawks), complications from Parkinson's disease.
- Jiro Ono, 73, Japanese politician, aspiration pneumonia.
- Christian Piquemal, 85, French military officer (French Foreign Legion).
- Miroslav Rodić, 58, Serbian politician.
- Carol Myers-Scotton, 92, American linguist.
- Harry Shorstein, 86, American lawyer.
- Bruno Spaggiari, 93, Italian motorcycle road racer.
- Daniel Stewart, 37, Australian footballer (Port Adelaide).
- Fedir Stryhun, 86, Ukrainian actor (The Lost Letter, Such Late, Such Warm Autumn, The Guide) and director.
- Robin Stubbs, 85, English footballer (Torquay United, Bristol Rovers, Birmingham City).
- George Thomas, 88, American baseball player (Boston Red Sox, Detroit Tigers, Los Angeles Angels).
- Mariusz Urbaniak, 54, Polish footballer (Zagłębie Lubin, Miedź Legnica).
- María José Verdú, 58, Spanish politician, member of the Parliament of the Balearic Islands (since 2023).

=== 24 ===
- Pete Banaszak, 82, American football player (Oakland Raiders).
- Leo Barry, 83, Canadian jurist and politician, Newfoundland and Labrador MHA (1972–1975, 1979–1989).
- Slavcho Binev, 60, Bulgarian politician, MEP (2007–2014), shot.
- Oleg Breyev, 54, Russian politician, member of the Kursk Oblast Duma (since 2026), heart failure.
- Pilar Burgués Monserrat, 67–68, Andorran writer.
- Rodney J. Clifton, 89, American mechanical engineer.
- John Cordts, 91, Canadian racing driver.
- Ali Haroun, 99, Algerian politician, member of the High Council of State (1992–1994).
- Derrick Harriott, 87, Jamaican singer and record producer.
- Michael Horvit, 94, American composer.
- Arch Jelley, 104, New Zealand Hall of Fame athletics coach.
- Klaus Matischak, 88, German footballer (Viktoria Köln, Schalke 04, Werder Bremen).
- Barry Murphy, 86, English footballer (Barnsley, South Shields). (death announced on this date)
- Pius Olakunle Osunyikanmi, 55, Nigerian civil servant.
- Pauline Parker, 88, New Zealand convicted murderer (Parker–Hulme murder case). (death reported on this date)
- Muhammad Shafiqur Rahman, 77, Bangladeshi journalist and politician, MP (2019–2024), stroke.
- Terry Shaw, 89, New Zealand cricketer (Northern Districts) and rugby union player (Thames Valley RFU).
- Widodo Adi Sutjipto, 82, Indonesian military officer and politician, coordinating minister for political and security affairs (2004–2009), commander of the National Armed Forces (1999–2002), and chief of staff of the Navy (1998–1999).
- Phil Vandersea, 83, American football player (Green Bay Packers, New Orleans Saints, Montreal Alouettes).

=== 25 ===
- Roxana Amed, 63, Argentine jazz singer.
- Jack Armstrong, 79, American professional wrestler (WWWF, UWF).
- Jumbo Baretta, 59, American professional wrestler (CWF, WCW, UWF).
- Eric Bauza, 46, Canadian voice actor (Looney Tunes, Muppet Babies, Uncle Grandpa), hypertensive heart disease.
- René Belletto, 81, French writer.
- Kevin Bleyer, 54, American television writer (The Daily Show, Politically Incorrect) and speechwriter (Barack Obama), four-time Emmy winner, traffic collision.
- Darko Božović, 48, Montenegrin footballer (Mladenovac, Bežanija, national team).
- Jogen Chowdhury, 87, Indian painter, MP (2014–2020), blood cancer.
- Chef Damu, 72, Indian chef (Cooku with Comali).
- Gerald Fischbach, 87, American neuroscientist.
- Rudi Fuchs, 84, Dutch art historian and museum curator.
- Frank Gagliano, 89, American track and field coach (Georgetown Hoyas).
- José Luis García Sánchez, 85, Spanish film director (Habla, mudita, The House Must Be Unmade, Dearest Maria).
- Sverre Horge, 82, Norwegian actor (Nissene på låven, 'Nedtur, Life and Death).
- Peggy King, 96, American jazz singer and actress (Zero Hour!), complications from Alzheimer's disease.
- Walter Koenig, 90, American actor (Star Trek, Babylon 5, Moontrap), cardiopulmonary arrest complicated by congestive heart failure.
- Komanche, 30, Salvadoran content creator and broadcaster, suicide by hanging.
- Józef Lipień, 77, Polish wrestler, Olympic silver medalist (1980).
- Sandra Yanira Martínez Tobar, 67, Salvadoran meteorologist and politician, deputy (2021–2024).
- Misha Mavashi, 41, Russian rapper and political activist (Northern Man).
- Phil McDonald, 80, English audio engineer (Abbey Road, All Things Must Pass) and record producer (Sweets from a Stranger), Grammy winner (1970), kidney failure.
- Ross Newhan, 89, American sportswriter (Los Angeles Times, Long Beach Press-Telegram).
- Phil O'Callaghan, 80, Irish rugby union player (Dolphin, national team).
- Oswaldinho do Acordeon, 72, Brazilian accordionist and composer.
- Otto Peters, 100, German academic.
- Mohsen Rastani, 67, Iranian photographer and photojournalist.
- Paolo Romeo, 88, Italian Roman Catholic cardinal, apostolic nuncio to Haiti (1983–1990) and Colombia (1990–1999), archbishop of Palermo (2007–2015).
- Yaakov Sussmann, 95, Israeli philologist and scholar of the Talmud.
- Christine Wren, 78, American baseball umpire (Single-A, Northwest League).

=== 26 ===
- Victor Anicet, 88, French visual artist and ceramist.
- Michèle Barzach, 83, French politician, minister of health (1986–1988), MP (1988–1990), stroke.
- Keith Boardman, 100, Australian biochemist.
- Barry Clemens, 83, American basketball player (Cleveland Cavaliers, Chicago Bulls, Seattle SuperSonics).
- Peter Dobing, 87, English footballer (Stoke City, Blackburn Rovers, Manchester City).
- Andrei Doroshkevich, 89, Russian theoretical astrophysicist and cosmologist.
- Jonathan Finlay, 78, British paediatric neuro-oncologist.
- Sir David Gascoigne, 86, New Zealand lawyer and arts advocate, viceregal consort (2016–2021).
- Carlos Gerena, 55, Puerto Rican Olympic boxer (1992), traffic collision.
- Lee Harland, 53, English rugby league player (Castleford Tigers, Doncaster RLFC, national team).
- Andrés Hernando, 88, Spanish bullfighter, traffic collision.
- Pamela Howard, 87, English set designer (Royal Shakespeare Company).
- Donnie Iris, 83, American rock musician (The Jaggerz) and songwriter ("The Rapper", "Ah! Leah!"), bladder cancer.
- Abdul Waheed Kakar, 89, Pakistani military officer, chief of the army staff (1993–1996).
- Sheffi Paz, 74, Polish-born Israeli anti-immigration activist, cancer.
- Camila Kfouri, 48, Brazilian psychologist and DJ.
- Frank Portelli, 82, Maltese politician, MP (1987–1992).
- Marian Rafael, 59, Czech convicted murderer.
- Simon Isaacs, 4th Marquess of Reading, 84, British peer, banker and philanthropist, member of the House of Lords (1981–1999).
- Yahaya Ibrahim Masussuka, 47, Nigerian Islamic preacher and religious teacher, shot.
- Mark McGuinn, 58, American country singer ("Mrs. Steven Rudy").
- Lhamsuren Myagmarsuren, 88, Mongolian chess master.
- David Rigert, 79, Russian weightlifter, Olympic champion (1976).
- Susan Saint James, 80, American actress (McMillan & Wife, Love at First Bite, Kate & Allie), Emmy winner (1969), pancreatic cancer.
- Alfredo Sánchez Monteseirín, 69, Spanish politician, mayor of Seville (1999–2011).
- Mahadev Shankar, 94, Malaysian jurist, judge of the Court of Appeal (1994–1997).
- Leena Sipilä, 95, Finnish Olympic sprinter (1952).
- Antoine Spire, 80, French essayist and journalist (Le Matin de Paris, Le Monde).
- Antal Steer, 83, Hungarian Olympic wrestler (1968, 1972). (death announced on this date)
- Vladimir Uglev, 80, Russian scientist, developer of Novichok.
- Akio Usami, 83, Japanese Olympic long-distance runner (1968, 1972, 1976), cancer.
- Heiko Weber, 61, German football player (Carl Zeiss Jena) and manager (ZFC Meuselwitz, Carl Zeiss Jena), pancreatic cancer.
- Lily Wong Fillmore, 92, American linguist.

=== 27 ===
- Jim Boyd, 84, American news anchor (WCVB-TV).
- Shell Busey, 83, Canadian freelance broadcaster and carpenter.
- Cristina Calero, 35, Spanish politician, member of the Parliament of the Canary Islands (since 2023).
- Franco Carrera, 82, Italian footballer (Potenza, Novara, Taranto).
- Bryan Davies, Baron Davies of Oldham, 86, British politician, MP (1974–1979, 1992–1997) and member of the House of Lords (1997–2024).
- Emerson, 46, Brazilian footballer (Grêmio, Juventude, Madureira), complications from a heart attack.
- Eddie Gray, 78, American guitarist (Tommy James and the Shondells).
- Ronny Hallin, 88, American television producer (Step by Step, Happy Days, Laverne & Shirley).
- Norbert Haupert, 86, Luxembourgish Olympic middle-distance runner (1960) and politician.
- John Heil, 83, American philosopher.
- Renée Hirschon Philippakis, 82, South African anthropologist.
- Andrew P. Iosue, 98, American Air Force general.
- Martin Jelínek, 55, Czech basketball player (Zbrojovka Brno, Tonak Nový Jičín, Sparta Praha). (death announced on this date)
- Stephen Kovacevich, 86, American classical pianist and composer.
- André Lacroix, 81, Canadian ice hockey player (Philadelphia Flyers, San Diego Mariners, Hartford Whalers).
- Joseph Lagu, 94, South Sudanese politician, president (1978–1979).
- Howard Lyman, 88, American farmer and animal rights activist.
- Valery Lysenko, 65, Russian drummer and singer (Mister Twister).
- Peter Medak, 88, Hungarian-born British film director (The Ruling Class, The Changeling, Romeo Is Bleeding).
- Solomon Minassian, 95, Iranian film producer.
- Gandung Pardiman, 73, Indonesian politician, member of the House of Representatives (2009–2014, since 2018).
- J. M. Ranson, 88, English rugby union player (Rosslyn Park, Barbarians, national team). (death announced on this date)
- Anthony Robinson, 95, American novelist and short story writer.
- Ursula von Rydingsvard, 84, German-born American sculptor, complications from Alzheimer's disease.
- Fernando Serrano Migallón, 81, Mexican jurist, member of the Mexican Academy of Language.
- B. P. Singh, 77, Indian television producer and director (CID, Aahat, SuperCops Vs Super Villains), heart attack.
- Mieke Sterk, 80, Dutch Olympic runner (1968) and politician.
- Bobby Wright, 84, American country singer and actor (McHale's Navy).
- Neeraj Yadav, 42, Indian javelin thrower, suicide by poisoning.
- Gotaro Yoshimura, 87, Japanese politician, aspiration pneumonia.
- Italo Zannier, 94, Italian photographer and art historian.

=== 28 ===
- Muhammad al Ali, 94, Saudi Arabian poet.
- Eudaldo Báez Galib, 88, Puerto Rican politician, senator (1992–2008).
- Barbara Barrie, 95, American actress (Company, Breaking Away, Suddenly Susan), assisted suicide.
- Tony Berlant, 85, American artist, complications from Alzheimer's disease.
- Gullan Bornemark, 98, Swedish musician, lyricist and composer.
- Cuauhtémoc Cárdenas, 92, Mexican politician, head of government of Mexico City (1997–1999), governor of Michoacán (1980–1986) and senator (1976–1980).
- Ray Gripper, 88, Zimbabwean cricketer (national team).
- Alvin Hellerstein, 92, American jurist (prosecution of Nicolás Maduro and Cilia Flores), judge of the U.S. District Court for Southern New York (since 1998).
- Dolores Huerta, 96, American labor leader and activist, co-founder of United Farm Workers, cancer.
- Nadia Karam, 67, Egyptian actress.
- Liu Yandong, 80, Chinese politician, vice premier (2013–2018), state councillor (2008–2013), and head of the UFWD (2002–2007).
- Jean-Baptiste Motroni, 91, French politician, senator (1997–1998).
- Andrei Nemykin, 54, Russian footballer (Armavir, Kuban, Niva Slavyansk-na-Kubani).
- Pipo Nguyen-duy, 63–64, Vietnamese-American fine art photographer and academic (Oberlin College), shot.
- Pino Presti, 83, Italian arranger.
- Max Schott, 91, American writer and novelist.
- Glynn Simmons, 72, American wrongfully convicted prisoner, colon cancer.
- Brian Smith, 88, Canadian ice hockey player (Detroit Red Wings, Buffalo Bisons, Los Angeles Blades).
- Elke Sommer, 85, German actress (The Prize, A Shot in the Dark, Boy, Did I Get a Wrong Number!), heart failure.
- Sir Patrick Stewart, 86, English actor (Star Trek, X-Men, Hamlet), Grammy winner (1996), complications from Alzheimer's disease and Lewy body dementia.
- Isaac Tédambé, 72, Chadian economist and novelist.
- Notable Spanish deaths in the Urda train crash:
  - Fátima Báñez, 59, politician and economist, minister of employment and social security (2011–2018) and deputy (2000–2019)
  - Patricia Fernández Häring, 58, architect and urbanist
  - Julieta Gallego, 24, athlete
  - Marisa Manchado, 70, composer, pianist and academic
  - Marta Shahbazi, 41, biologist (MRC Laboratory of Molecular Biology, Cambridge Stem Cell Institute) and professor (University of Cambridge)

=== 29 ===
- Dennis Baldry, 94, English cricketer (Middlesex, MCC, Hampshire).
- Werner Broll, 94, German politician.
- Jan Byś, 72, Polish footballer (Szombierki Bytom).
- Choi Bool-am, 86, South Korean actor (1st Republic, The Last Witness), television presenter (Korean Cuisine and Dining) and academic, complications from spinal surgery.
- Jovan Despotović, 74, Serbian art historian and art critic. (death announced on this date)
- Manuel Donoso, 90, Chilean Roman Catholic prelate, auxiliary bishop (1996–1997) and archbishop (1997–2013) of La Serena.
- Michael P. Drazin, 97, English-American mathematician (Drazin inverse).
- Desmond D'Sa, 70, South African environmentalist, traffic collision.
- Barbara Easterling, 93, American labor unionist.
- Ünal Erkan, 84, Turkish police officer and politician, governor of OHAL region (1992–1995) and chief of the General Directorate of Security (1991–1992).
- Cevin Fisher, 63, American DJ and record producer, cancer.
- Paolo Galluzzi, 84, Italian science historian.
- Kyle Glencross, 54, Canadian makeup artist (Dawn of the Dead, Saw, Scott Pilgrim vs. the World).
- Dan Goddard, 78, American politician, member of the Kansas Senate (2017–2021) and House of Representatives (since 2023).
- Shirish Hiremath, 75, Indian cardiologist, brain cancer.
- Kojiro Ikegaya, 74, Japanese baseball player (Hiroshima Toyo Carp).
- Freddie James, 89, American high school football coach (David W. Carter High School).
- June Jones, 73, American football player (Atlanta Falcons) and coach (Hawaii Rainbow Warriors, Hamilton Tiger-Cats).
- Keri Jones, 81, Welsh rugby union (Cardiff RFC, national team) and league (Great Britain national team) player.
- Sandra Kerr, 84, English folk singer, leukaemia.
- Paul Maue, 94, German Olympic road racing cyclist (1952).
- Janis Mayes, 77, American author and literary critic.
- Andrés Mendoza, 78, Mexican cannibal and serial killer.
- Peter Nolan, 91, Irish Gaelic footballer (Clara, New York).
- Luan Omari, 101, Albanian academic.
- Josip Pečarić, 79, Croatian mathematician and writer.
- Michel Pineda, 62, French footballer (Espanyol, Toulon, Racing de Santander).
- Liudmyla Radchenko, 94, Ukrainian Olympic athlete (1960).
- Josef Ritler, 87, Swiss journalist (Blick).
- Barry Rushworth, 85, Australian rugby league player (Parramatta Eels, Australia national team).
- Melvin Sephus, American singer (The Rude Boys). (death announced on this date)
- Marvin Shanken, 83, American publisher (Wine Spectator, Cigar Aficionado, Whisky Advocate).
- Paweł Socha, 91, Polish Roman Catholic prelate, titular bishop of Thunigaba (since 1973) and auxiliary bishop of Zielona Góra-Gorzów (1973–2012).
- Bronislava Volková, 80, Czech-American poet.

=== 30 ===
- Richard Alarcón Urrutia, 74, Peruvian Roman Catholic prelate, bishop of Tarma (2001–2014) and archbishop of Cusco (since 2014), cancer.
- Atmani, 81, Algerian singer.
- Martin Blinder, 89, American forensic psychiatrist, pancreatic cancer.
- Russell Carver, 91, English rower.
- Annaclara Cataldi Palau, 86, Italian paleographer. (death announced on this date)
- JoBe Cerny, 78, American actor (Pillsbury Doughboy).
- Bill Clifton, 95, American bluegrass musician and singer.
- Milton Coleman, 79, American journalist (The Washington Post).
- Robert W. Curran, 76, American politician, member of the Baltimore City Council (1995–2016).
- Helmut Donner, 85, Austrian Olympic high jumper (1960).
- Steve Ellis, 76, English singer (Love Affair, Widowmaker).
- Waldemar Gerhardt, 87, German footballer (Schalke 04, Fortuna Düsseldorf).
- Jonathan Guinness, 3rd Baron Moyne, 96, British peer, merchant banker and writer, member of the House of Lords (1992–1999).
- Sanjay Gupta, 59, Indian film director (Kaabil, Shootout at Lokhandwala, Jazbaa), fall.
- Carol E. Hoffecker, 87, American academic.
- Jeong Jae-ho, 95, South Korean politician, member of the National Assembly (1973–1980).
- Saiyud Kerdphol, 104, Thai general.
- Don Knodel, 95, American basketball coach (Rice Owls, Houston Angels).
- Domanlal Korsewada, 78, Indian politician, Chhattisgarh MLA (2008–2013, since 2023), lung infection.
- Guido Neri, 87, Italian racing cyclist.
- William Nordhaus, 85, American economist, Nobel Prize laureate (2018), brain cancer.
- Jean-Claude Passeron, 95, French sociologist.
- Matt Pavelich, 92, Canadian Hall of Fame ice hockey linesman (NHL).
- Vatsala Rajagopal, 92, Indian actress (Roja, Sathi Leelavathi, Kaalamellam Kadhal Vaazhga).
- Geoffrey Richmond, 85, English football executive, chairman of Scarborough F.C. (1988–1994) and Bradford City A.F.C. (1994–2002).
- Savinder Singh, 88, Malaysian Olympic field hockey player (1968).
- Ravindra Kishore Sinha, 75, Indian security firm executive and politician, founder of SIS Limited and MP (2014–2020).
- Paweł Tucholski, 57, Polish actor (The Crown of the Kings).
- Susana Urbina, 80, Peruvian-born American psychologist.
- Doug Woolard, 76, American college athletics director (Saint Louis Billikens, South Florida Bulls).
- Matthew Wright, 52, American television producer (The Ellen DeGeneres Show).

=== 31 ===
- Juan Atkins, 64, American record producer ("No UFO's"), techno musician (The Belleville Three, Cybotron) and DJ, heart attack.
- Sara Bender, 78, Israeli historian.
- Dame Avisene Carrington, 108, Barbadian educator.
- Jorge Carrión Pavlich, 76, Peruvian Roman Catholic prelate, bishop of Puno (since 2000).
- Dan Doornink, 70, American football player (New York Giants, Seattle Seahawks).
- Martin Erlichman, 97, American film and television producer (Coma, Breathless) and talent manager (Barbra Streisand).
- John Evans, 79, English footballer (Torquay United) and bowler.
- Horst Fascher, 90, German music manager, co-founder of the Star-Club.
- Marcia Ann Gillespie, 82, American magazine editor (Essence, Ms.) and activist.
- Bob Heinz, 79, American football player (Miami Dolphins, Washington Redskins).
- Philip Juico, 78, Filipino sports executive and politician, president of the Philippine Athletics Track and Field Association (2015–2022), chairman of the Philippine Sports Commission (1996–1998) and secretary of agrarian reform (1987–1989), cancer.
- Mišo Kovač, 85, Croatian singer.
- Larry Kristoff, 83, American Olympic wrestler (1964, 1968).
- Loeske Kruuk, 56, British evolutionary ecologist, cancer.
- Sheila Lapinsky, 82, South African anti-apartheid and LGBTQ+ activist.
- Frank Lenti, 79, Canadian outlaw biker.
- Princess Marie-Cécile of Prussia, 84, German noblewoman.
- Troels Mylenberg, 56, Danish actor, cancer.
- Jonathan O. Ndagi, 96, Nigerian scholar.
- Jack Preger, 96, British physician.
