= Walter J. Tomasch =

American physicist (1930–2026)

- Born: Walter John Tomasch; July 26, 1930; Cleveland, Ohio, U.S.
- Died: October 16, 2026 (aged 96)
- Education: Case Western Reserve University; Rensselaer Polytechnic Institute
- Occupation: Physicist
- Spouse: Joyce Ellen Hutyera (m. 1955; died. 2000)
- Children: 2

Walter John Tomasch (July 26, 1930 – October 16, 2026) was an American physicist.

== Early life and career ==
Tomasch was born in Cleveland, Ohio, on July 26, 1930, the son of Julius Tomasch and Helen Schmiedl. He earned his BS degree at Case Western Reserve University in 1952. He also earned MS degree at Rensselaer Polytechnic Institute in 1955, and earned his PhD degree at Case Western in 1958.

He served as a professor in the department of physics at the University of Notre Dame. During his years as a professor, in 1968, he was named a fellow of the American Physical Society.

== Personal life and death ==
In 1955, Tomasch married Joyce Ellen Hutyera. They had two children. Their marriage lasted until her death in 2000.

Tomasch died at his home on October 16, 2026, at the age of 96.
