= Mathew J. Burrows =

American intelligence expert (1953–2026)

- Born: August 31, 1953
- Died: October 2026 (aged 73)
- Education: Wesleyan University, University of Cambridge, United Kingdom
- Occupations: Intelligence and strategic foresight expert, author
- Title: Director Foresight, Strategy, and Risks Initiative, Atlantic Council

Mathew James Burrows (August 31, 1953 – October 2026) was an American intelligence and strategic foresight expert and author.

Burrows was the leading author of several National Intelligence Council’s Global Trends editions, an unclassified assessment of long term key trends, threats and uncertainties used to prepare incoming U.S. Presidents at the beginning of a new Administration, that are widely read and commented upon : "Global Trends 2020: Mapping the Global Future" (December 2004), "Global Trends 2025: A Transformed World" (November 2008) and "Global Trends 2030: Alternative Worlds" (December 2012).

== Background ==
Born in Ohio on August 31, 1953, Burrows earned a Bachelor of Arts degree in American and European History from the Wesleyan University (Connecticut), as well as a Master of Arts degree and PhD in History from the University of Cambridge, United Kingdom.

Burrows lived in Washington, D.C.. He died in October 2026, at the age of 73.

== Career ==
Burrows spent almost 25 years with the Central Intelligence Agency (CIA), including being assigned as special assistant to the US UN Ambassador Richard Holbrooke (1999-2001) and detailed to the National Intelligence Council (NIC) during the last decade of his career. After leaving the NIC, he joined the Atlantic Council, a non-partisan public policy think tank based in Washington, D.C, as Director of the Foresight, Strategy, and Risks Initiative. Burrows joined Stimson Center in 2022 as a distinguished fellow and program lead of the Strategic Foresight Center.

At the National Intelligence Council, he established the Long Range Analysis Unit, currently called Strategic Futures Group (2005). While his Global Trends reports were praised as well written and very informative, as well as for the use of scenarios, some have argued that the last one written by Burrows retained a US-centric character, especially by downplaying the issues of climate change and of the mounting trend of conflicts based on religious or cultural identity.

He was a long-standing partner of the European Strategy and Policy Analysis System (ESPAS), which is the European institutions' foresight network, from its inception in 2011 and the co-publication by the NIC and the European Union’s Institute for Security Studies (EUISS) of "Global Governance 2025: At a Critical Juncture", the first unclassified report by the National Intelligence Council developed with a non-US organization.

Burrows provided commentaries on the lack of the US Administration's strategic preparedness for global disasters, such as the coronavirus pandemic.

In March 2021, a brief published by Burrows and Emma Ashford in the Atlantic Council's New American Engagement Initiative’s Reality Checks series regarding United States’ approach to Russia caused a public battle.

== Publications ==
After leaving the NIC in 2013, he wrote "The Future, Declassified: Megatrends That Will Undo the World Unless We Take Action", which features both non-fiction and fiction chapters (2014). The book "Global System on the Brink: Pathways toward a New Normal" (2016), which he co-authored with Alexander Dynkin, President of the Russian Institute of World Economy and International Relations (IMEMO), was included in the University of Pennsylvania's list of "Best Policy studies and reports published by a Think Tank" in 2016.

Burrows continued to publish reports on global issues under his position such as "Global Risks 2035: The Search for a New Normal" and its update "Decline or New Renaissance" or on the implications of the COVID19 pandemic.

In late 2023, he published with a German scholar, Josef Braml, a book entitled "Dreamwalkers: How China and the US are sliding into a new World War".

His academic contributions focussed on the use of strategic foresight methodologies in government.
