= Jacques Charlin =

French mathematician (1948–2026)

- Born: 2 November 1948
- Died: 17 October 2026 (aged 77)
- Occupation: Mathematician

Jacques Charlin (2 November 1948 – 17 October 2026) was a French mathematician. A recipient of the Legion of Honour, he served as vice president of the French Confederation for the Social Advancement of the Blind and Amblyopic, and was a professor in the department of mathematics at the Claude Bernard University Lyon 1.

Charlin died on 17 October 2026, at the age of 77.
