= T. Randall Lee =

American chemist (1962–2026)

Thomas Randall Lee
- Born: September 12, 1962
- Died: October 6, 2026 (aged 64); Texarkana, Texas, U.S.
- Education: B.A., Rice University 1985; Ph.D., Harvard University 1991
- Website: https://www.uh.edu/nsm/chemistry/people/faculty/Lee/

Thomas Randall Lee (September 12, 1962 – October 6, 2026) was an American chemist. He held the Cullen Distinguished University Chair in Chemistry at the University of Houston, where he also served as Associate Dean for Research in the College of Natural Sciences and Mathematics. Lee died on October 6, 2026, at the age of 64.

== Education ==
- NIH Postdoctoral Fellow, Caltech, 1991–1993
- Ph.D., Harvard University, 1991
- B.A., Rice University, (Magna Cum Laude) 1985
