= Jakub Schwarz Trojan =

Czech theologian (1927–2026)

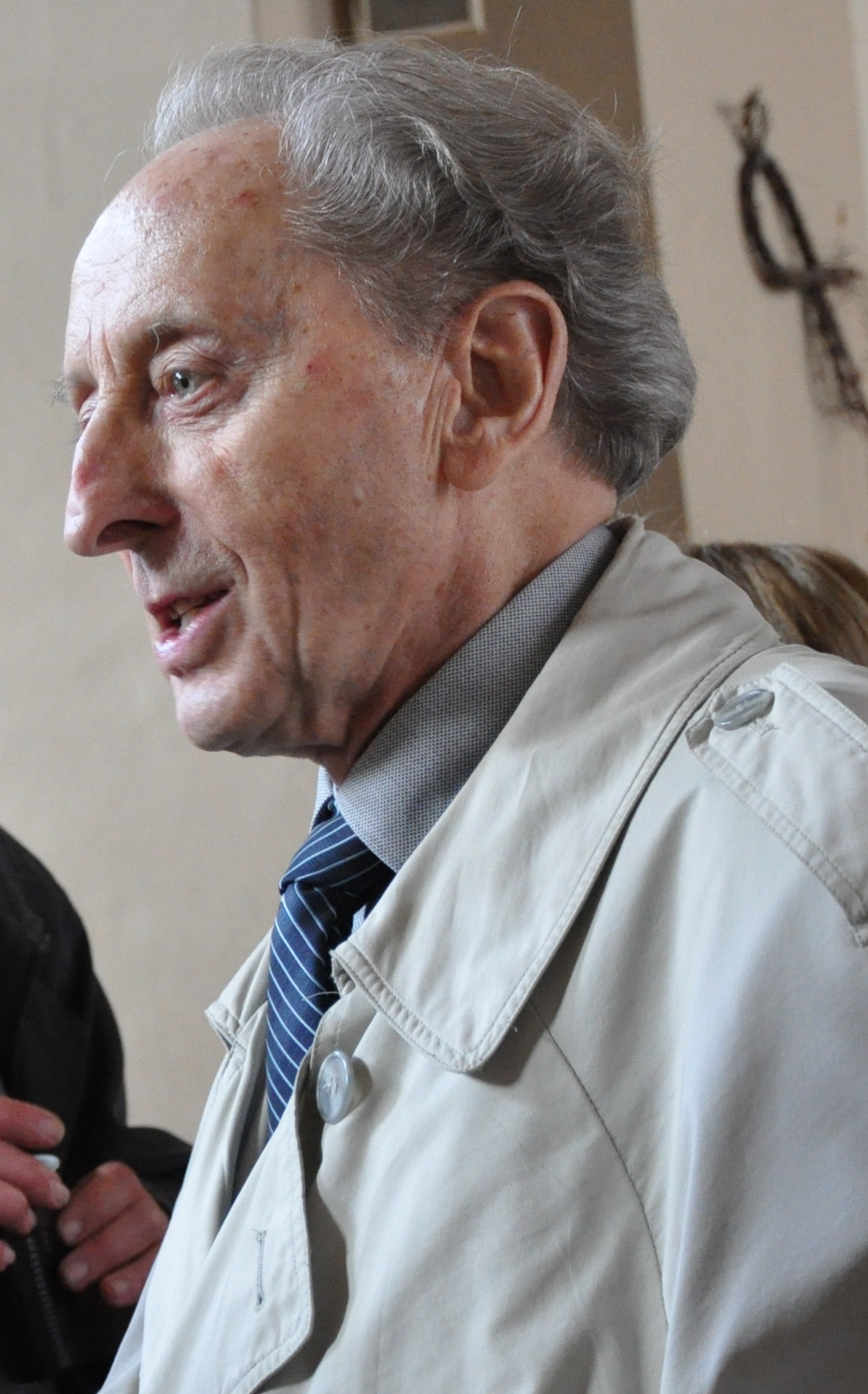
- Jakub Schwarz Trojan (2015)
- Born: 13 May 1927; Paris, France
- Died: 7 October 2026 (aged 99)
- Occupations: Theologian; Pedadogue
- Theological work
- Tradition or movement: Protestant

Jakub Schwarz Trojan (13 May 1927 – 7 October 2026) was a Czech theologian. He was dean of the Evangelical Theological Faculty of Charles University from 1990 to 1996. Schwarz Trojan died on 7 October 2026, at the age of 99.
