= Sharon Sites Adams =

American sailor (1930–2026)

Sharon Sites Adams (May 29, 1930 – October 16, 2026) was an American sailor who became the first woman to sail solo across the Pacific Ocean, which she did in 1969, from Yokohama to San Diego in her boat named "Sea Sharp II". For this feat she was named the Los Angeles Times Woman of the Year in 1969.

== Biography ==
Adams was born in Washington on May 29, 1930, with the given names Phyllis Mae. After her parents died when she was quite young, she was looked after by different family members and given the new name Sharon. She took her first sailing lesson at Marina Del Rey, California, in October 1964 at the age of 34. She was the only civilian besides the Captain's wife on the bridge of the "Queen Mary" when it rounded Cape Horn on its final voyage to Long Beach, California. In 1965 she became the first woman to sail alone from California to Hawaii, which she did in 39 days in her 25-foot folkboat named “Sea Sharp”. In 2008, she published her memoir Pacific Lady.

Adams died on October 16, 2026, at the age of 96.
