= Dušan Uhlíř =

Czech historian (1938–2026)

- Born: 28 July 1938; Brno, Czechoslovakia
- Died: 1 October 2026 (aged 88); Brno, Czech Republic
- Education: Masaryk University
- Occupations: Historian; museum director

Dušan Uhlíř (28 July 1938 – 1 October 2026) was a Czech historian and museum director. He died in Brno on 1 October 2026, at the age of 88.

== Publications ==
- Anály ze Spálené ulice. Praha : Mladá fronta, 1979. 202 s.
- Slunce nad Slavkovem. Praha : Mladá fronta, 1984. 422 s. 2. vyd. Třebíč : Akcent, 2000. 468 s. ISBN 80-7268-092-7. 3.vyd. Třebíč : Akcent, 2010. 472 s.
- Republikánská strana venkovského a malorolnického lidu 1918-1938 : Charakteristika agrárního hnutí v Československu a jeho organ. struktura. Praha : Ústav československých a světových dějin ČSAV, 1988. 267 s.
- Brněnský pitaval. Brno : Rovnost, 1992. 254 s. ISBN 80-901354-2-0.
- Bitva tří císařů : Slavkov - Austerlitz 1805. Brno : AVE, 1995. 135 s. ISBN 80-900941-7-1. 2. vyd. Brno : AVE, 2005. 159 s. ISBN 80-86831-01-9.
- Černý den na Bílé hoře : 8. listopad 1620. Brno : AVE, 1998. 169 s. ISBN 80-902242-6-1.
- Joseph Freiherr von Hormayr zu Hortenburg. Politisch-historische Schriften, Briefe und Akten (spolu s Helmutem Reinalterem). Frankfurt am Main -Berlin -Bern -Bruxelles -New York -Oxford -Wien – Peter Lang, 2003. 418 s. ISSN 0937-4353 ISBN 3-631-39144-7.
- Slezský šlechtic Felix Lichnovský : poslední láska kněžny Zaháňské. Praha ; Litomyšl : Paseka, 2009. 156 s. ISBN 978-80-7432-014-9.
- Moravský pitaval. Velké Bílovice : TeMi CZ, 2011. 312 s. ISBN 978-80-87156-63-6.
- Slezsko v dějinách českého státu, II. (spoluautor) Praha : Lidové noviny, 2012. 595 s. ISBN 978-80-7422-169-9.
- Drama Bílé hory. Česká válka 1618-1620. Brno : C Press, 2015. 164 s. ISBN 978-80-264-0151-3.
- Bitva na Bílé hoře 8. 11. 1620. České Budějovice : Veduta, 2018. 112 s. ISBN 978-80-88030-29-4.
