= Mariusz Urbaniak =

Polish footballer (1972–2026)

Personal information
- Date of birth: 22 June 1972
- Place of birth: Zgorzelec, Poland
- Date of death: 23 October 2026 (aged 54)
- Height: 1.82 m (6 ft 0 in)
- Position: Midfielder

Youth career
- 1982–1987: Granica Bogatynia
- 1987–1990: Zagłębie Lubin

Senior career*
| Years | Team | Apps | (Gls) |
| 1990–1992 | Zagłębie Lubin | 23 | (0) |
| 1992–1998 | Miedź Legnica | 103 | (11) |
| 1996–1997 | → Karkonosze Jelenia Góra (loan) | | |
| 1998–1999 | Granica Bogatynia | | |
| 1999–2000 | VfB Zittau | | |
- Nysa Zgorzelec
- Granica Bogatynia
| 2007–2008 | Jaśnica Opolno Zdrój | | |

Managerial career
- Granica Bogatynia (player-manager)
- 2010–2012: Bazalt Sulików
- 2013: Bazalt Sulików
- * Club domestic league appearances and goals

Mariusz Urbaniak (22 June 1972 – 23 October 2026) was a Polish footballer who played as a midfielder.

== Career ==
A product of Granica Bogatynia's youth system, at the age of 15, he joined the youth team of Zagłębie Lubin, with which he took third place at the Polish Junior Football Championships in 1990. That same year, he was promoted to Zagłębie's first team. He made his debut in the top flight on 30 March 1991 in a scoreless draw against Legia Warsaw. In the 1990–91 season, he won the title with Zagłębie. On 2 October 1991, he played in that season's European Cup tie against Brøndby IF which Zagłębie won 2–1. In total, he made 23 Ekstraklasa appearances for Zagłębie. In 1992, he moved to Lower Silesian rivals Miedź Legnica where he made 94 second division appearances. He also played in both legs of the tie against AS Monaco (0–1 and 0–0) in the 1992–93 European Cup Winners' Cup. During the third tier 1996–97 season, he played on loan at Karkonosze Jelenia Góra, with which he won promotion to the second tier. At the end of the 1997–98 season, he suffered an injury, and after Miedź's relegation from the league, he joined Granica Bogatynia, at the time also taking a job at a construction company. Between 1999 and 2000, he played for the German club VfB Zittau, then he was a player for Nysa Zgorzelec, and later became a player-manager of Granica Bogatynia. In the 2007–08 season, he played for amateur club Jaśnica Opolno Zdrój. Between 2010 and 2012 and in 2013, he was the manager of Bazalt Sulików. He then subsequently took a job at a Czech car headlight manufacturing company.

== Death ==
Urbaniak died on 23 October 2026, at the age of 54.

== Career statistics ==
Appearances and goals by club, season and competition
| Club | Season | League | | |
| Club | Season | Division | Apps | Goals |
|---|---|---|---|---|
| Zagłębie Lubin | 1990–91 | I liga | 9 | 0 |
| Zagłębie Lubin | 1991–92 | I liga | 14 | 0 |
| Zagłębie Lubin | Total | | 23 | 0 |
| Miedź Legnica | 1992–93 | II liga | 26 | 3 |
| Miedź Legnica | 1993–94 | II liga | 31 | 5 |
| Miedź Legnica | 1994–95 | II liga | 17 | 1 |
| Miedź Legnica | 1997–98 | II liga | 20 | 0 |
| Miedź Legnica | Total | | 94 | 9 |
| Career total | | | 117 | 9 |
