= André Ledran =

French politician (1933–2026)

Mayor of Ouistreham
- In office 13 March 1983 – 13 January 1984
- In office 6 March 1984 – 5 April 2014

Member of the National Assembly of France
- In office 2 April 1986 – 14 May 1988
- Constituency: Calvados

Personal details
- Born: 16 January 1933 Carentan, France
- Died: 14 October 2026 (aged 93) Caen, France
- Party: PS

André Ledran (16 January 1933 – 14 October 2026) was a French politician. A member of the Socialist Party, he served as mayor of Ouistreham from 1983 to 2014 and in the National Assembly of France from 1986 to 1988.

Ledran died in Caen on 14 October 2026, at the age of 93.
