= Kamil Pulec =

Czech actor (1963–2026)

- Born: 1 September 1963; Prešov, Czechoslovakia
- Died: 1 October 2026 (aged 63)
- Education: Secondary Industrial School of Civil Engineering, České Budějovice
- Years active: 1984–2026
- Awards: The Slovácko Oscar (1995); Největší z pierotů (2000)

Kamil Pulec (1 September 1963 – 1 October 2026) was a Czech theatre, television and film actor. In 2000, he was awarded the Slovácko Oscar, and in 2000, he was awarded the Největší z pierotů Award.

== Life and career ==
Kamil Pulec was born on 1 September 1963 in Prešov, Czechoslovakia. In 1969, he relocated with his parents to Hluboká nad Vltavou. From 1978 to 1982, he studied highschool at Secondary Industrial School of Civil Engineering, České Budějovice and graduated after two years of compulsory military service.

Pulec started his acting career in 1984 at the Slovácké Theatre in Uherské Hradiště. He played Miloš Hrma in Closely Watched Trains, which earned him the Czech Literary Fund Award for best male performance in 1985. From 1989 to 1991, he performed at the South Bohemian Theatre before returning to Slovácké Theatre in 1992. During his second time in the Theatre, he got many famous roles such as Lennie Small in Of Mice and Men, and Winston Churchill in The King's Speech. Pulec later left the theatre permanently in 2018.

Pulec died on 1 October 2026, at the age of 63.

== Filmography ==
List of films and roles he had played.

=== Film ===
Year	Title
1994	Potkal jsem ho v ZOO
1995	Artuš, Merlin a Prchlíci
2009	Klíček
2024	Výjimečný stav

=== Television ===
Year	Title
1994	Medvědi nic nevědí
2001	Četnické humoresky
2007	Četnické humoresky
2008	Černá sanitka
2014	Rozsudek
2019	Modrý kód
2019	Rozsudek
2022	Případy 1. oddělení
2023	Kriminálka Anděl
2024	Náhradníci
2026	Místo zločinu Zlín

=== Stage recordings ===
Year	Title	Theatre
2005	Liška Bystrouška	Slovácké divadlo
2007	Božena Němcová: Viktorko! Karlo!! Báro!!!	Slovácké divadlo
2011	Harold a Maude	Slovácké divadlo
2016	Cena facky	Slovácké divadlo
