= Muhammad al Ali =

Saudi poet (1932–2026)

Muhammad Al-Ali
- محمد العلي
- Born: 1932; Al-Imran, Al-Ahsa, Saudi Arabia
- Died: 28 October 2026 (aged 94)
- Education: Quranic school in Al-Ahsa * Najaf (religious sciences)
- Occupations: Poet, writer, thinker
- Writing career
- Period: 20th–21st century
- Genres: Poetry, essays
- Notable works: No Water in the Water * Olympic Rings

Muhammad Al-Ali (Arabic: محمد العلي; 1932 – 28 October 2026) was a Saudi poet and thinker. He was considered one of the pioneers of modernity writers and poets in the Kingdom of Saudi Arabia. He was born in Al-Imran in Al-Ahsa in 1932. He wrote a corner (water words) in Al-Youm newspaper, and published many books, most notably the Diwan (No Water in Water), And a book (Olympic Circles: Essays on Enlightenment and Modernity Issues).

== Early life and education ==
Al-Ali was born and raised in Al-Ahsa under the patronage of his father, where he learned the principles of reading and writing. He memorized the Quran in a Quranic school in his hometown. Later on, Al-Ali moved with his father to Najaf in Iraq to receive religious sciences. He obtained a bachelor's degree in 1956, then returned to Al-Ahsa in 1964.

== Work ==
Al-Ali worked as a teacher at Dammam High School in 1965 for three years, then moved to work in the Department of Education and continued in the field of education for nineteen years. He worked as editor-in-chief of Al-Yaum newspaper for two years.

He worked as an educational supervisor at the Royal Commission for Jubail in 1986 and continued in this work until 1993.

== Death ==
Al-Ali died on 28 October 2026, at the age of 94.

== Publications ==
- Water Words (original title: Kalimat Ma'eya كلمات مائية) A book including Al-Ali's press articles, prepared and collected by Muhammad Abdelwahab al-Shaqaq and Hamza Husain al-Hamoud, Published by Alintishar Alarabi Foundation in 2008.
- No water in the Water (original title: La maa' fi al-Maa' لا ماء في الماء) A collection of poems. Issued by Nadi al-Mantiqa al-Sharqiyah al-Adabi in 2009.
- Concerns of Light (original title: Humum al-Dawo' هموم الضوء) A collection of Al-Ali's articles published between 1978 and 2000 in Al-Yaum newspaper. Issued by Dar Tawa in 2011. Collected and prepared by Ahmed Al-Ali.
- Lesson of the Beach (original title: Dars al-Bahrدرس البحر) A book issued by Dar Tawa in 2012.
- The Growth of Concepts: Questions and Opinions on Existence and Values (original title: نمو المفاهيم: تساؤلات وآراء في الوجود والقيم) A book of several critical and intellectual lectures written by Al-Ali during his literary career spanning more than forty years. Published by the Riyadh Literary Club in cooperation with the Arab Cultural Club in 2013.
- The Impossible Well: Attempts to Transcend the Prevalent in Culture and Society (original title: البئر المستحيلة: محاولات لتجاوز السائد في الثقافة والمجتمع) A book of intellectual articles written during Al-Ali's literary career in some local and Arab newspapers. Published by the Riyadh Literary Club in cooperation with the Arab Cultural Center in 2013.
- Olympic Rings: Articles on Enlightenment and Modernity Issues (original title: حلقات أولمبيّة: مقالات في قضايا التنوير والحداثة) A book published by Tabuk Literary Club in cooperation with Dar Madarek in 2013.
- No one is at Home (original title: La Ahad fi al-Bayt لا أحد في البيت) A book prepared and edited by Ahmad Al-Ali and issued by Dar Masaa in 2015.

== Lectures ==
"Alienation, its concept and its contemporary manifestations" A lecture by Al-Ali given at the Society of Culture and Arts in Dammam in 2019.

== Honors ==
In 2015, he was honored by giving his name to the first session of the Poetry Festival, which was launched by the House of Poetry of the Society for Culture and Arts in Dammam. On the occasion of his honor, a book was published entitled "The Blue That Taught Us Songs تلك الزرقة التي علمتنا الأناشيد" which included testimonies presented by friends and writers of the poet during his journey.
