= Jean-Baptiste Motroni =

French politician (1934–2026)

Member of the French Senate for Haute-Corse
- In office 8 March 1997 – 30 September 1998
- Preceded by: François Giacobbi
- Succeeded by: Paul Natali

Personal details
- Born: 10 November 1934
- Died: 28 October 2026 (aged 91)
- Party: Socialist
- Occupation: Politician

Jean-Baptiste Motroni (10 November 1934 – 28 October 2026) was a French politician who served as a member of the Senate for Haute-Corse from 1997 to 1998.

Motroni died on 28 October 2026, at the age of 91.
