= Carol E. Hoffecker =

American historian (1938–2026)

Carol Hoffecker (December 29, 1938 – October 30, 2026) was the Richards Professor Emerita of History at the University of Delaware. She worked on the history of Delaware.

== Early life ==
Hoffecker was born in Wilmington, Delaware, on December 29, 1938. She attended the Mount Pleasant School District from 1944 to 1956. Hoffecker attained her undergraduate degree at the University of Delaware, graduating with honors in 1960. She wrote her senior thesis on the siege of Lewes, Delaware during the War of 1812. Her teaching career began at Sweet Briar College in 1963 and she later taught at Northeastern University.

== Career ==
Hoffecker earned her master's degree in history at Radcliffe College, and a Ph.D. from Harvard University in 1967. She returned to her home state of Delaware in 1968 as a junior resident scholar at the Hagley Museum and Library, where she began work on a history of Delaware. She completed her fellowship program at the Hagley Museum and Library in 1970. That year, she also returned to UD, when she became coordinator of the Hagley Graduate Program and taught courses on Delaware history and urban history. In 1973, she became a full-time faculty member.

For the next 30 years, Hoffecker devoted herself to teaching and the study of history, with focus on the State of Delaware. Her students, both undergraduate and graduate, respected her knowledge and passion for history and benefited from her commitment to their education.

From 1983 to 1988, Hoffecker chaired the history department. She was named associate provost for graduate studies from November 1988 until June 1995. She was awarded the Del Tufo Award for Outstanding Contributions to the Humanities (1988); and received an Honorary Doctorate of Humane Letters from Goldey-Beacom College (1993); and was awarded the University of Delaware Medal of Distinction (1998).

Hoffecker was named 1999 Delaware Professor of the Year by the Carnegie Foundation for the Advancement of Teaching and the Council for Advancement and Support of Education.

During her three-decade tenure at the University, Hoffecker completed terms as vice president and then president of the Faculty Senate, was Chair of the Department of History (1983–1985), and Associate Provost for Graduate Studies (1988–1995). She led the Faculty Senate Ad Hoc Committee on Education, chaired the University's Commission on the Status of Women, and served on the board of the University of Delaware Press.

Hoffecker's significant efforts and accomplishments have been recognized with several awards, including a named professorship, induction in the Alumni Wall of Fame, the Francis Alison Faculty Award, the E.A. Trabant Award for Women's Excellence, a University of Delaware Medal of Distinction.

Hoffecker was the first ever College of Arts and Sciences Distinguished Lifetime Service Award in 2003. She was honored with inclusion in the Hall of Fame of Delaware Women in 1993.

At the time of her retirement in 2003, Hoffecker was the Richards Professor Emerita of History.

Hoffecker served as an exhibit curator or consultant to a number of historical institutions, including the Historical Society of Delaware, the Delaware Public Archives, and the Rockwood Museum. She was a contributor to the Encyclopedia Britannica, where she collaborated on the writing of the entry on Delaware. She was editor of the magazine Delaware History, has spoken frequently on Delaware history to organizations throughout the state, and was a historian of her own school – the University of Delaware. She donated her papers and a collection of 71 bookplates to the University of Delaware Special Collections.

Hoffecker died in Rockford, Illinois, on October 30, 2026, at the age of 87.

== Selected publications ==
Hoffecker, Carol E. (1974). Brandywine Village, The Story Of A Milling Community. Wilmington, Delaware: Old Brandywine Village Inc. ASIN B0006CHIM0.

Hoffecker, Carol E. (1974). Wilmington, Delaware: portrait of an industrial city, 1830-1910. Charlottesville, Virginia: Published for the Eleutherian Mills-Hagley Foundation by the University Press of Virginia. ISBN 978-0-8139-0519-8.

Hoffecker, Carol E. (1977). Delaware: a Bicentennial history. The States and the Nation series. New York, New York: Norton. ISBN 978-0-393-05620-4.

Hoffecker, Carol E. (1983). Corporate Capital: Wilmington In The 20th Century. Philadelphia, Pennsylvania: Temple University Press. ISBN 978-0-87722-305-4.

Hoffecker, Carol E. (1994). Beneath Thy Guiding Hand : A history Of Women At The University of Delaware. Newark, Delaware: University of Delaware.

New Sweden in America. Carol E. Hoffecker (ed.). Newark, Delaware: Univ. of Delaware Press [u.a.] 1995. ISBN 978-0-87413-520-6.

Hoffecker, Carol E. (2000). Honest John Williams: U.S. Senator From Delaware. Cultural studies of Delaware and the Eastern Shore. Newark, Delaware: University of Delaware Press; Associated University Presses. ISBN 978-0-87413-713-2.
