= Kalju Kruusa =

Estonian poet, editor and translator (1973–2026)

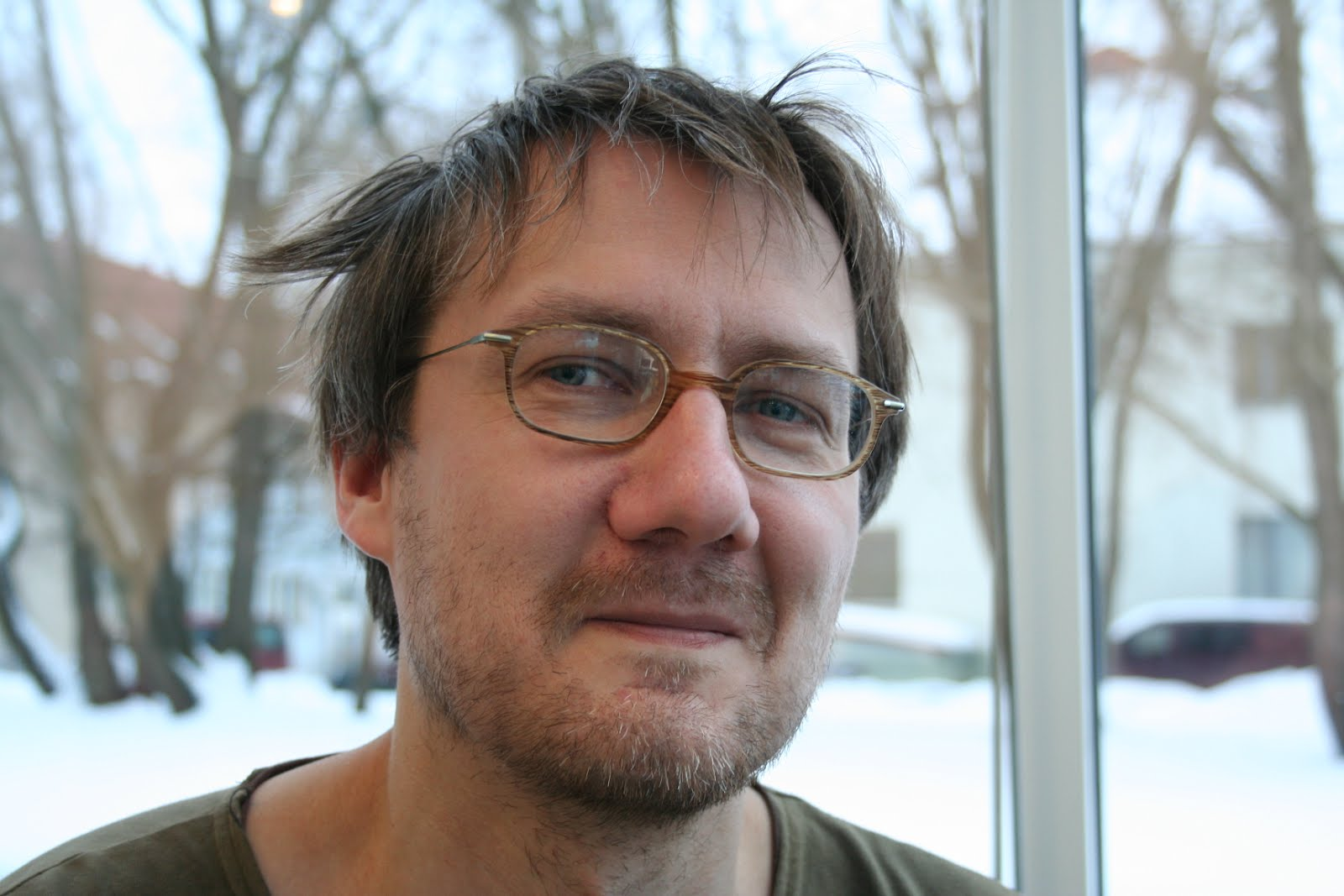
Kalju Kruusa (2012)

Kalju Kruusa (born Jaanus Valk; 10 October 1973 – 20 October 2026) was an Estonian poet, editor and translator.

== Life and career ==
From 1993, he was studying at University of Tartu, Tallinn University and Waseda University (Tokyo). In 2008, he defended his BA thesis on the French symbolist poet Stéphane Mallarmé.

He was one of the founders of the literary group Erakkond ('Hermitkind'), established in 1996. With Hasso Krull, he founded in 2001 the poetry e-magazine Ninniku, being its co-editor until 2010.

Kruusa died on 20 October 2026, at the age of 53.

== Works ==
- 1999: poetry collection "Meeleolu" ('Frame of Mind')
- 2004: poetry collection "Treffamisi" ('Encounters')
- 2010: poetry collection "Tühhja" ('Nothing')
- 2015: poetry collection "Äädikkärbsed" ('Fruit Flies')
