= Ken Ward =

Australian rules footballer (1935–2026)

Personal information
- Full name: Kenneth Ward
- Born: 30 September 1935
- Died: 18 October 2026 (aged 91)
- Original team: Ashburton
- Height: 173 cm (5 ft 8 in)
- Weight: 80 kg (176 lb)

Playing career^{1}
Years	Club	Games (Goals)
1956–59	Richmond	43 (0)
- ^{1} Playing statistics correct to the end of 1959.

Kenneth Ward (30 September 1935 – 18 October 2026) was an Australian rules footballer who played with Richmond in the Victorian Football League (VFL). He died on 18 October 2026, at the age of 91.
