= Henry Dougier =

French publisher (1936–2026)

- Dougier in 2015
- Born: 27 December 1936; Neuilly-sur-Seine, France
- Died: 18 October 2026 (aged 90)
- Education: ESSEC Business School
- Occupation: Publisher

Henry Dougier (27 September 1936 – 18 October 2026) was a French publisher. He co-created the magazine Le Management along with Jean-Louis Servan-Schreiber, and founded the Éditions Autrement, a publishing company.

Dougier died on 18 October 2026, at the age of 90.
