= Louis-André Dacoury-Tabley =

Ivorian politician (1945–2026)

Minister of Solidarity and War Victims
- In office December 2010
- President: Laurent Gbagbo
- Prime Minister: Guillaume Soro

Minister of Water and Forests
- In office 2016–2017
- President: Alassane Ouattara
- Prime Minister: Daniel Kablan Duncan

Personal details
- Born: 14 September 1945 Gagnoa, Ivory Coast, French West Africa
- Died: 17 October 2026 (aged 81) Abidjan, Ivory Coast

Louis-André Dacoury-Tabley (14 September 1945 – 17 October 2026) was an Ivorian politician. He served as minister of solidarity and war victims of Ivory Coast in December 2010, and as minister of water and forests of Ivory Coast from 2016 to 2017.

Dacoury-Tabley died in Abidjan on 17 October 2026, at the age of 81.
