= Henri Maler =

French political activist and academic (1946–2026)

- Born: 26 November 1946; Toulouse, France
- Died: 3 October 2026 (aged 79)
- Education: University of Paris
- Occupations: Political activist Academic

Henri Maler (French: [ɑ̃ʁi male]; 26 November 1946 – 3 October 2026) was a French political activist and academic.

Maler was a graduate of the University of Paris, where he joined the Union Nationale des Étudiants de France and the Revolutionary Communist Youth. In the midst of the 1995 strikes, he wrote an article of support in Le Monde. In 1996, he co-founded the media criticism association Acrimed and served as its president until 2015. That same year, he announced his support for Pierre Bourdieu's "General Assembly of the Social Movement".

Maler died on 3 October 2026, at the age of 79.

== Publications ==
- Congédier l'utopie ? L'utopie selon Karl Marx (1994)
- Hegel passé, Hegel à venir (1995)
- Convoiter l'impossible : l'utopie avec Marx, malgré Marx (1995)
- Une certaine idée du communisme : répliques à François Furet (1996)
- Émancipation - Petits essais de marxologie tatillonne en marge de quelques bouquins récemment parus (2002)
- Marx et l'appropriation sociale (2003)
- Médias en campagne : retours sur le referendum de 2005 (2005)
- L'opinion, ça se travaille : les médias & les guerres justes (2006)
- Médias et mobilisations sociales : la morgue et le mépris (2007)
- L’opinion, ça se travaille... Les médias et les « guerres justes (2014)
