= Lou Yulie =

Chinese academic (1934–2026)

- 楼宇烈
- Born: 10 December 1934; Hangzhou, Zhejiang, China
- Died: 9 October 2026 (aged 91)
- Education: Peking University
- Occupations: Philosophy researcher, academic, author

Lou Yulie (simplified Chinese: 楼宇烈; traditional Chinese: 樓宇烈; pinyin: Lóu Yǔliè; 10 December 1934 – 9 October 2026) was a Chinese philosopher, professor of philosophy and religious studies at Peking University who served as Honorary Dean of Institutes of Religion and Culture and was the founding director of the Institute of Chinese Buddhist Cultural Studies. Lou worked on the area of history of Chinese Philosophy, Chinese Buddhism and Buddhist philosophy in Peking University for more than 50 years. He was well known nationally and internationally for his study of the history of Chinese philosophy, especially the study of metaphysics during the Wei and Jin period (220–420 CE) and the modern philosophy of China, as well as the promotion of Chinese culture.

== Life and career ==
Lou was born in Hangzhou, Zhejiang on 10 December 1934, with his ancestral home in Shengzhou. After the high school of Pujiang High School, he studied, then taught, at what is now Peking University. He was appointed lecturer of the Department of Philosophy, Peking University, in June 1979, becoming associate professor in December 1980 and professor in September 1985. In December 1989, he was elected a member of Academic Committee of the Peking University. Lou served as vice-president of the National Academy of Religion between 1988 and 1995, and a member of the Academic Degrees Committee of the State Council from 1992 to 1997.

Lou died on 9 October 2026, at the age of 91.

== Works ==
- A Refresher: A Collection of Papers on Chinese Philosophy
- Collation of the Works of Wang Bi
- Buddhism and the Spirit of Humanism in China

== Awards ==
- Collation of the Works of Wang Bi - Third place prize from the National Ancient Books Collation
