= Leonel Nunes =

Portuguese politician (1949–2026)

Member of the Legislative Assembly of Madeira
- In office 1996–2011

Personal details
- Born: 11 November 1949 Funchal, Portugal
- Died: 17 October 2026 (aged 76) Funchal, Portugal
- Party: PCP

Leonel Martinho Gomes Nunes (11 November 1949 – 17 October 2026) was a Portuguese politician. A member of the Portuguese Communist Party, he served in the Legislative Assembly of Madeira from 1996 to 2011.

Nunes died in Funchal on 17 October 2026, at the age of 76.
