= Doug Woolard =

American college athletics director (1950–2026)

Biographical details
- Born: 1950
- Died: October 30, 2026 (aged 76)

Administrative career (AD unless noted)
- 1988–1989: Washington State (assistant AD)
- 1989–1994: Washington State (Assc. Dir. for External Operations)
- 1994–2004: Saint Louis
- 2004–2013: South Florida

Doug Woolard (1950 – October 30, 2026) was an American college athletics director who served at Saint Louis University and the University of South Florida.

== Career ==
Woolard held sports administration roles at Washington State University starting in 1988. Woolard was named athletic director at Saint Louis University in October 1994. He remained there until May 2004, when he was hired as athletic director at the University of South Florida.

In January 2014, Woolard was reassigned from his role as athletic director, pending the expiration of his contract. Woolard retired from the University with an accelerating agreement in July 2014.

In 2016, auditors named Woolard and other staff in reports of over-payment of 2014 salaries in possible violation of Florida law.

== Personal life and death ==
Woolard and wife, Cherrie, were the parents of two children, Chris and Amy.

Woolard died on October 30, 2026, at the age of 76.
