= Michel de Guillenchmidt =

French civil servant and politician (1941–2026)

Member of the General Council of Loir-et-Cher
- In office 4 October 1973 – 18 March 1976

Personal details
- Born: 19 August 1941 Paris, German-occupied France
- Died: 5 October 2026 (aged 85) Paris, France
- Party: RPR
- Education: École nationale d'administration Sciences Po
- Occupation: Civil servant

Michel de Guillenchmidt (French: [miʃˈɛl dˈə- ɡijɑ̃ʃmˈit]; 19 August 1941 – 5 October 2026) was a French civil servant and politician of the Rally for the Republic (RPR).

== Life and career ==
A graduate of the Sciences Po, he was the RPR's national delegate for freedom and human rights in 1984. In 2009, he was named an Officer of the Legion of Honour.

De Guillenchmidt died in Paris on 5 October 2026, at the age of 85.

== Publications ==
- Dénationaliser (1983)
- Histoire constitutionnelle de la France depuis 1789 (2000)
- Guide Pratique des Élections (2007)
- Droit constitutionnel et institutions politiques (2010)
