= Federico l'Olandese Volante =

Italian radio presenter (1950–2026)

Friedrick van Stegeren (19 April 1950 – 9 October 2026), known professionally as Federico l'Olandese Volante, was a Dutch-born Italian radio host. He won the Golden Headphones Award, "for best communication in Italian" in 2011.

He died on 9 October 2026, at the age of 76.
