= Rodney Muñoz =

American costume designer (1966–2026)

- Born: September 14, 1966; Los Angeles, California, U.S.
- Died: October 2, 2026 (aged 60)
- Education: New York University
- Occupation: Costume designer

Rodney Muñoz (September 14, 1966 – October 2, 2026) was an American costume designer. He won a Primetime Emmy Award in the category Outstanding Costumes for his work on the television program Jimmy Kimmel Live!.

Muñoz died on October 2, 2026, at the age of 60.
