= Mister Twister (band) =

Russian rockabilly band

Mister Twister Мистер Твистер
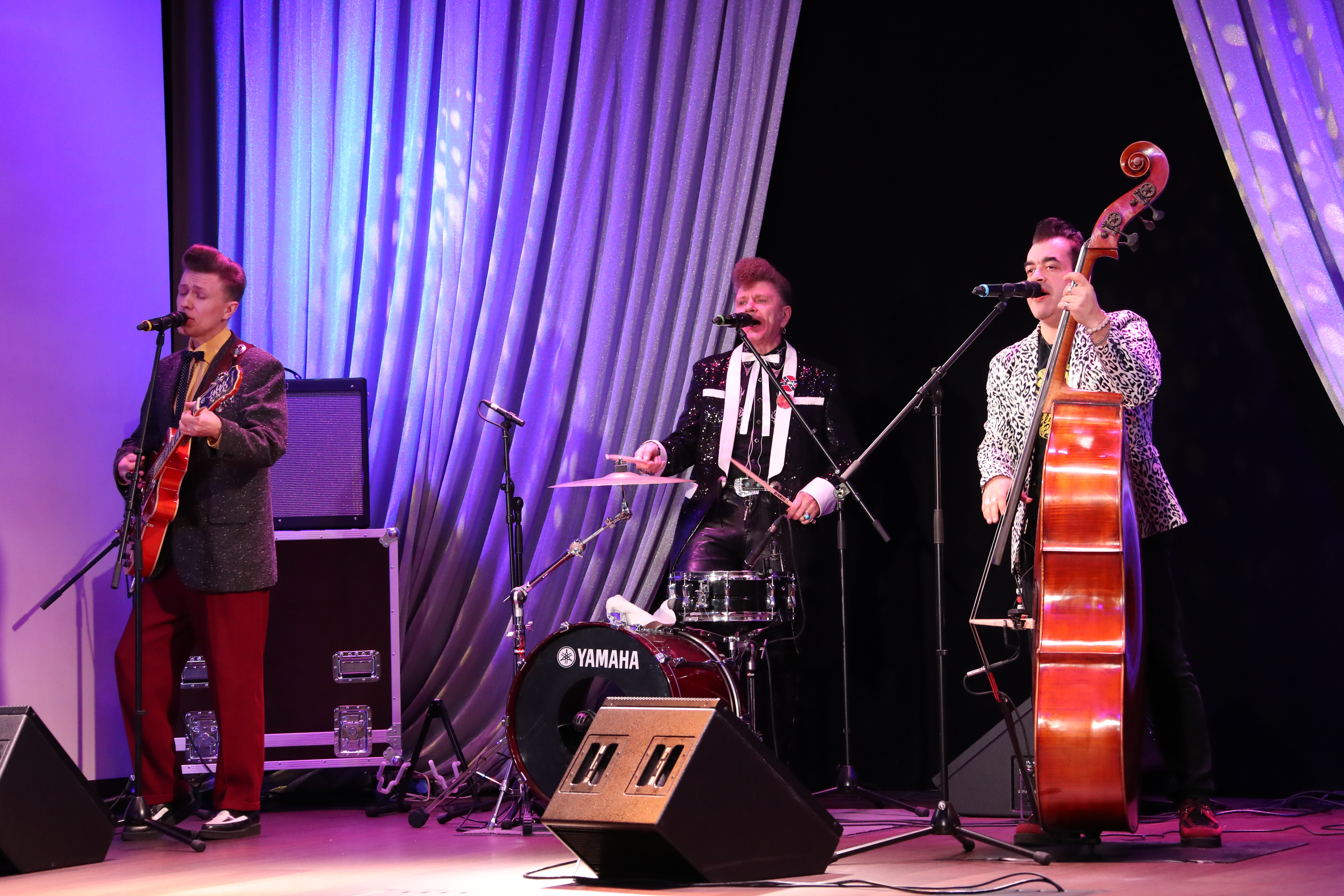

Background information
- Origin: Moscow, Russia
- Genres: Rock and roll; rockabilly
- Years active: 1985–present
- Label: Melodiya
- Members: Alexey Vikhrev; Sergey Tepaykin
- Past members: Valery Lysenko; Vadim Dorokhov; Oleg Usmanov; Pavel Verenchikov; Denis Pozen; Fyodor Ponomaryov; Oleg Butenko; Vasily Derkach; Pavel Styopin; Vladimir Kumarin; Yuri Sutkovoy; Sergey Sukhanov
- Website: www.mistertwister.ru

Mister Twister (Russian: Ми́стер Тви́стер) is a Russian rockabilly band. The band was formed in 1985 when rock’n’roll music was allowed in the Soviet Union.

Drummer Valery Lysenko died on 27 October 2026, at the age of 65.

== Discography ==
- 1990 – Мистер Твистер (Mister Twister) (Melodiya, 1990)
- 1991 – Девки, пиво и рок-н-ролл (Chix, Beer and Rock 'n' Roll) (1991 "SNC" LP, CD; 1994 "Союз" MC)
- 1996 – Первые Твисты (The Early Twists) (CD; MC "Союз")
- 1999 – Миллионер (The Millionaire) (MC CD "Экстрафон")
- 2002 – Имена На Все Времена (The Names of All Time) (compilation)
- 2004 – Live in Schwein
- 2005 – Rocker
