= Dave DeWitt =

American food historian

David Austin DeWitt (February 9, 1944 - October 21, 2026) was an American food historian.

== Early life and education ==
DeWitt was born on February 9, 1944 in Boston.

DeWitt received a BA from the University of Virginia in 1966.

== Career ==
In 1975, DeWitt moved to New Mexico. In 1975 and 1976, he played Captain Space, a host of television program aired on KOAT-TV. As the Captain, he appeared with his sidekick Rusty the Robot to introduce science fiction and monster movies.

DeWitt became interested in chili peppers soon after moving to New Mexico. He was frustrated by the lack of publicly available information on them, which led him to research and publish on the subject. In 1984, he and dietitian Nancy Gerlach co-wrote The Fiery Cuisines.

In 1987, DeWitt founded the bimonthly Chile Pepper magazine. By 1993, it had 80,000 subscribers. In 1988, he founded the National Fiery Foods Show. In 1997, he founded Fiery Foods Magazine.

In 1996, DeWitt founded the Scovie Awards, awards given to spicy and barbecue products.

In 2000, DeWitt hosted and co-produced, with the media arts department of New Mexico State University, Heat Up Your Life a video documentary on chili peppers.

In 2023, DeWitt retired from running the Fiery Foods Show.

== Awards and honors ==
In 2015, DeWitt was inducted into the Hot Sauce Hall of Fame.

== Personal life ==
DeWitt died on October 21, 2026.

== Books ==
- Chile Peppers: A Global History (University of New Mexico Press)
- The Founding Foodies: How Washington, Jefferson, and Franklin Revolutionized American Cuisine (Sourcebooks, 2010)
- with Paul W. Bosland The Pepper Garden (1993)
- with Paul W. Bosland Peppers of the World: An Identification Guide (Ten Speed Press, 1997)
- The Whole Chile Pepper Book (Little, Brown, 1990)
- The Hot Sauce Bible (1996)
- The Chile Pepper Encyclopedia (1999)
- with Nancy Gerlach The Spicy Food Lover's Bible (2005)
- Precious Cargo: How Foods From the Americas Changed the World (Counterpoint, 2014)
- with Janie Lamson The Field Guide to Peppers (Timber Press)
- with Paul W. Bosland The Complete Chili Pepper Book (Timber Press)
- with Jose C. Marmolejo The Mexican Chili Pepper Cook Book (University of New Mexico Press, 2022)
