= Rachid Soualhi =

Algerian footballer (1949–2026)

Personal information
- Date of birth: 16 January 1949
- Place of birth: Batna, French Algeria
- Date of death: 7 October 2026 (aged 77)
- Position: Goalkeeper

Youth career
- –1968: MSP Batna

Senior career*
Years	Team	Apps	(Gls)
1968–1975	MSP Batna		
1975–1977	CA Batna		
1977–1982	MSP Batna		

International career
1971–1972	Algeria	2	(0)
- * Club domestic league appearances and goals

Rachid Soualhi (Arabic: هارون رشيد صوالحي; 16 January 1949 – 7 October 2026) was an Algerian footballer who played as a goalkeeper.

A native of Batna, he joined MSP Batna in the Championnat National in 1968. He was twice selected for the Algerian national team, once in a 0–0 draw with Libya and once in a 5–1 defeat by Guinea.

Soualhi died on 7 October 2026, at the age of 77.
