= Cecily Gemmell =

English secretary (1928–2026)

Cecily Gemmell (25 December 1928 – 8 October 2026) was an English secretary. She was the personal secretary to Winston Churchill from 1947 to 1951 and was the secretary of Clementine Churchill from 1951 to 1953. Gemmell died on 8 October 2026, at the age of 97.
