= Bakir Bayakhunov =

Kazahk composer (1933–2026)

- Бәкір Баяхунов
- Born: 15 September 1933; Alma-Ata, Kazakh SSR, Soviet Union
- Died: 9 October 2026 (aged 93)
- Known for: Classical music; operatic music

Bӓkır İahiianūly Baiahunov (Kazakh: Бәкір Яхиянұлы Баяхунов; 15 September 1933 – 9 October 2026) was a Kazakh classical and operatic composer, who was a professor at the Kazakh National Conservatory. He was an Honored Artist of the Kazakh SSR (1983) and People's Artist of the Kazakh SSR (1990). Bayakhunov died on 9 October 2026, at the age of 93.
