= Barbara Gawryluk =

Polish children's book author (1957–2026)

Barbara Gawryluk (19 May 1957 – 16 October 2026) was a Polish children's book author, journalist and translator. She died on 16 October 2026, at the age of 69.

== Publications ==
- Kaktus dobry pies (2004)
- Kaktus szukaj! (2005)
- Przedszkolaki z ulicy Morelowej (2005)
- W Zielonej Dolinie (2006)
- Dżok, legenda o psiej wierności (2007)
- Gwizdek nie chce spać (2008)
- Gwizdek i śniegowa kula (2008)
- Zuzanka z pistacjowego domu (2009)
- Wiosenna wyprawa Gwizdka (2009)
- Gwizdek i lato na łące (2010)
- Moje Bullerbyn (2010)
- Kaktus wierny przyjaciel (2010)
- Słony skarb. Przewodnik dla dzieci po Kopalni Soli w Wieliczce (2011)
- Kolczyk Selmy (2011)
- Mali bohaterowie (2011)
- Dziewczynka z fotografii (2012)
- Baltic: pies, który płynął na krze (2012)
- Owocowe bajki (2013)
- Dwa domy (2013)
- Czarna, Klifka i tajemnice z dna morza (2014)
- Klifka. Opowieść o foczce, która szukała mamy (2015)
- Klinika zdrowego chomika (2015)
- Teraz tu jest nasz dom (2016)
- Klinika zdrowego chomika. Pudełko pełne kotów (2017)
- Mali bohaterowie (2017)
- Czart. Pies lawinowy (2018)
- Junior. Opiekun osób starszych (2018)
- Tutu. Opowieść o śwince, która marzyła o rajskiej wyspie (2018)
- Morus. Pies ratownik wodny (2018)
- Falco. Pies lotniskowy (2018)
- Moje Bullerbyn (2018)
- Ilustratorki, ilustratorzy. Motylki z okładki i smoki bez wąsów (2019) ISBN 978-83-66140-71-4
- Rollek. Pies przewodnik (2019)
- Baster. Pies ratowniczy (2019)
- Badyl. Pies policyjny (2020)
- Tatry. Przewodnik dla dużych i małych (2021) (wspólnie z Pawłem Skawińskim) ISBN 978-83-08-07483-1
- Tu Jest Nasz Dom (2022)
- Gdzie jest Pulpo? (2022) ISBN 978-838-141442-5
- Zdalna babcia (2022) ISBN 978-83-8240-294-0
- Moc Amelki (2022) ISBN 978-83-8208-106-0
- Podhale oraz Orawa, Spisz i Pieniny. Przewodnik dla dużych i małych, (2023) (wspólnie z Pawłem Skawińskim), ISBN 978-83-08-08122-8.
- Cwaniak. Kot z Wyspy Wikingów (2023), ISBN 978-83-8208-195-4.
- Pies na medal (2024), ISBN 9788382082487.
- Kraków. Przewodnik dla dużych i małych (praca zbiorowa, 2024), ISBN 9788308084144.
