= Jean-Pierre Péroncel-Hugoz =

French journalist and essayist (1940–2026)

- Péroncel-Hugoz in 2014
- Born: 16 March 1940; Marseille, France
- Died: 7 October 2026 (aged 86); Aix-en-Provence, France
- Education: Sciences Po; Geneva Graduate Institute
- Occupations: Journalist; Essayist

Jean-Pierre Péroncel-Hugoz (French: [ʒˈɑ̃-pjˈɛʁ peʁɔ̃sˈɛl-yɡˈɔz]; 16 March 1940 – 7 October 2026) was a French journalist and essayist.

A graduate of the Sciences Po and the Geneva Graduate Institute, he wrote of "dangers" stemming from Islam, citing the Iranian Revolution and the rise of the Muslim Brotherhood in Egypt. In 2007, he was interviewed by Le Choc du mois and stated that "without swords, without guns, without conquests, 50 million Muslims in Europe will soon transform it into a Muslim continent".

Péroncel-Hugoz died in Aix-en-Provence on 7 October 2026, at the age of 86.

== Awards ==
- Prix France-Liban (1984)
- Knight of the Legion of Honour (1993)

== Publications ==
- Le Royaume arabe ou l’Algérie sous Napoléon III (1974)
- Le Radeau de Mahomet (1983)
- Assassinat d’un poète (1983)
- Une croix sur le Liban (1984)
- Villes du Sud (1990)
- Petit journal lusitan : voyages au Portugal, en Macaronésie et au Brésil (2001)
- Le Fil rouge portugais : voyages à travers les continents (2002)
- Traversées de la France : hexagone et outremer (2004)
- Benslimane (2010)
- Le Maroc par le petit bout de la lorgnette (2010)
