= Moïse Kwasivi Fiadjoe =

Togolese gynaecologist (died 2026)

- Died: 3 October 2026; France
- Education: University of Lille
- Occupation: Gynaecologist

Moïse Kwasivi Fiadjoe (died 3 October 2026) was a Togolese gynaecologist.

== Life and career ==
A graduate of the faculty of medicine at the University of Lille, he specialized in anatomy, sonography, and gynaecology. He completed his residency in Tourcoing. He then returned to Togo and became the country's first doctor to equip his office with an ultrasound machine. A specialist in fertility treatment, he performed Togo's first in vitro fertilisation. His professional work also encompassed other medically assisted reproduction techniques, including intracytoplasmic sperm injection, artificial insemination, and oocyte cryopreservation. He was a founding member of the Groupe interafricain d'étude, de recherche et d'application sur la fertilité, created in Lomé in 2009. He was also the longtime director of Lomé's Biasa clinic. The clinic had assisted in more than 12,000 births since its creation.

Fiadjoe died in France on 3 October 2026.
