= Antoine Ciosi =

French singer and composer (1931–2026)

- Ciosi in 2008
- Born: 15 December 1931; Sorbo-Ocagnano, Corsica, France
- Died: 4 October 2026 (aged 94); Corbara, Corsica, France
- Occupations: Singer; Composer

Antoine Ciosi (French: [ɑ̃twˈan sjozˈi]; 15 December 1931 – 4 October 2026) was a French singer and composer.

== Life and career ==
Born in Sorbo-Ocagnano on 15 December 1931, Ciosi grew up in a rural family of four children. He described the differences in his childhood between free Corsica and the Italian occupation. He also described growing up with his father and the family-run tavern. He began composing songs in the Corsican language and notably won first prize at the Festival de la chanson corse in 1963 for the song "Paese spentu". He published an autobiography in 2005, titled Le chemin des sources profondes, which documented his early days as a singer living in the Montmartre section of Paris. He received much recognition for his contributions to Corsican music from the Museum of Corsica and in the 2018 documentary U Tragulinu : Antoine Ciosi, une histoire corse.

Ciosi died in Corbara on 4 October 2026, at the age of 94.

== Publications ==
- Notes & chansons (1978)
- Une odeur de figuier sauvage (1999)
- Chants d'une terre - 40 ans de chansons corses (2002)
- Le chemin des sources profondes (2004)
- Una mamma (2011)
- A Stella di Musè Namani / L'Étoile de Moïse Namani (2017)

== Distinctions ==
- Knight of the Legion of Honour (2001)
- Honorary citizen of Marseille (2018)
