= Otto Peters =

German academic (1926–2026)

Otto Peters (6 May 1926 – 25 October 2026) was a German academic who was the Founding Rector and professor emeritus at the FernUniversität (Distance Teaching University) in Hagen, Germany. He made contributions to the conceptual development of distance education. His main theory was called The Industrial Model. In this monograph "Distance education and industrial production: a comparative interpretation in outline" (1967) he described distance education as the most industrialized form of teaching and learning. He incorporated business management terms to show the industrial characteristics of distance education such as division of labour, assembly line, mass production and planning.

== Education ==
Peters did his initial schooling from 1932 to 1940 in Berlin. As he was interested in the field of education he went on to do teacher training in West Prussia from 1940 to 1944. In 1947 he did further studies in History, English, Philosophy, Psychology and Pedagogy with the Humboldt-University of Berlin. While teaching he continued his studies and graduated from the Free University of Berlin in 1960. In 1972 he pursued his doctorate at the University of Tübingen.

== Academic career ==
Year/period	Position	Institution/place	Academic achievement
After the World War	Teacher	Berlin-Kreuzberg	
1963	Secretary	Educational Centre of Berlin	Wrote first books on distance education
between 1963 and 1969	Deputy Director of the Department of Methodology of Teaching	Educational Centre of Berlin	Wrote further books on distance education
1969	Head of the Division of Comparative Distance Education Research	German Institute for Distance Education at University of Tübigen	Doctor phil.
1974	Professor of Education	Berlin	Full professor
1975	Founding Rector	FernUniversität in Hagen	Travelled and studied distance education in countries such as Japan, China, Australia, US and Great Britain
From 1991	Professor Emeritus	FernUniversität in Hagen	Continued distance education research

== Research ==
Peters started and established distance education research virtually as early as 1964. Hence he, together with Börje Holmberg, was called "a father of distance education research". In order to emphasize its importance and the special quality level of higher education he changed the so far mainly commercially used term "correspondence study" into the now worldwide accepted new term "Distance education".

His main contribution to the theory of distance education was his 1973 doctoral dissertation Die didaktische Struktur des Fernunterrichts: Untersuchungen zu einer industrialisierten Form des Lehrens und Lernens (The educational structure of distance education. Analysis of the most industrialized forms of teaching and learning). Noting that the field was dominated by Anglophone scholars, Desmond Keegan persuaded him to translate the main parts of this book into English. From 1969 to 1974 Peters was engaged in comparative distance teaching research whilst at the German Institute for Distance Education at the University of Tübigen. For over forty years the focus of his research was on the development and conceptual changes of distance education. He believed that not only industrialization, but also culture, economics and politics are highly influential on the respective distance teaching activities.

His research achievements have been recognized all over the world. He received five honorary doctorate degrees from the Open University in England, Deakin University in Australia, New York University in the US, the Open University of Hong Kong and the University of Guadalajara, Mexico for advances in his field. He received the Prize for Excellence from the International Council for Open and Distance Education. He was chosen as a member of the International Hall of Fame for Adult and Continuing Education.

== Publications ==
Peters' first theoretical analysis of distance education was published as a 45-page monograph in 1967 entitled Das Fernstudium an Universitäten und Hochschulen: didaktische Struktur und vergleichende lnterpretation: ein Beitrag zur Theorie der Fernlehre (Distance education at universities and higher education institutions: didactical structure and comparative analysis - a contribution to the theory of distance teaching). The second half of this monograph was translated and published by the University of Oldenburg and is also to be found in D. Sewart, D. Keegan and B. Holmberg (Eds.).

Apart from this early monograph Otto Peters wrote 24 books and countless articles on the challenges, conceptual developments and perspectives of distance education. Some of his main books are:

- Die didaktische Struktur des Fernunterrichts. Untersuchungen zu einer industrialisierten Form des Lehrens und Lernens. (The pedagogical structure of distance education. Analyses of an industrialized form of teaching and learning). Weinheim: Beltz, 1973.
- Die Fernuniversität. Das erste Jahr. Aufbau, Aufgaben, Ausblicke. (The Fernuniversität: the first year. Structure, tasks, prospects). Hagen: von der Linepe, 1976.
- Die Fernuniversität im fünften Jahr. Bildungspolitische und fernstudiendidaktische Aspekte (The Fernuniversität in its fifth year. Aspects of educational policy and methodology of distance education.) Köln: Verlag Schulvernsehen, 1981).
- Studium neben dem Beruf. Ergebnisse eines Forschungsprojekts. Co-author Raimund Pfundtner. (Higher education besides working for a living. Results of a research project.).Weinheim: Beltz, 1986.
- Otto Peters on Distance Education. Edited by Desmond Keegan. London: Kogan Page, 1994.
- Learning and Teaching in Distance Education. Pedagogical Analyses and Interpretations. London: Kogan Page, 2001.
- Distance Education in Transition. Developments and Issues. 1st edition, April 2002, 2nd edition, May 2002, 3rd revised and extended edition, July 2003, 4th revised and extended edition, November 2004, Reprint June 2006, reprint November 2007, 5th revised, extended and updated edition, November 2010. Oldenburg: Carl von Ossietzky University of Oldenburg, Center for Lifelong Learning. (also online).
- Against the Tide. Critics of Digitalization. Warners, Sceptics, Scaremongers, Apocalypticists. Oldenburg: BIS University Oldenburg, 2012. (also online).

== Additional work ==
In a later book, Peters explained not only the pros of digitalisation, but also the cons, bringing together the opinions of other critics in fields related to education such as lawyers, computer scientists and philosophers. One conclusion they came to was that digitalization will have a definite impact on the world. The general idea is that we cannot take anything for granted even though everything is digitized. There should be face-to-face interactions and a balance has to be made between the digital world and the world outside of that.

== Death ==
Peters died on 25 October 2026, at the age of 100.

== Additional resources ==
- Emeriti. (n.d.). Retrieved February 22, 2015, from http://ifbm.fernuni-hagen.de/struktur/emeriti/
- Otto Peters on Distance Education. (n.d.). Retrieved February 22, 2015, from https://books.google.com/books?id=1cvWAQAAQBAJ&q=All Books by Otto Petters
- Blaschke, Lisa Marie: The Critics of Digitalization.
