= Hans Egloff =

Swiss politician (1959–2026)

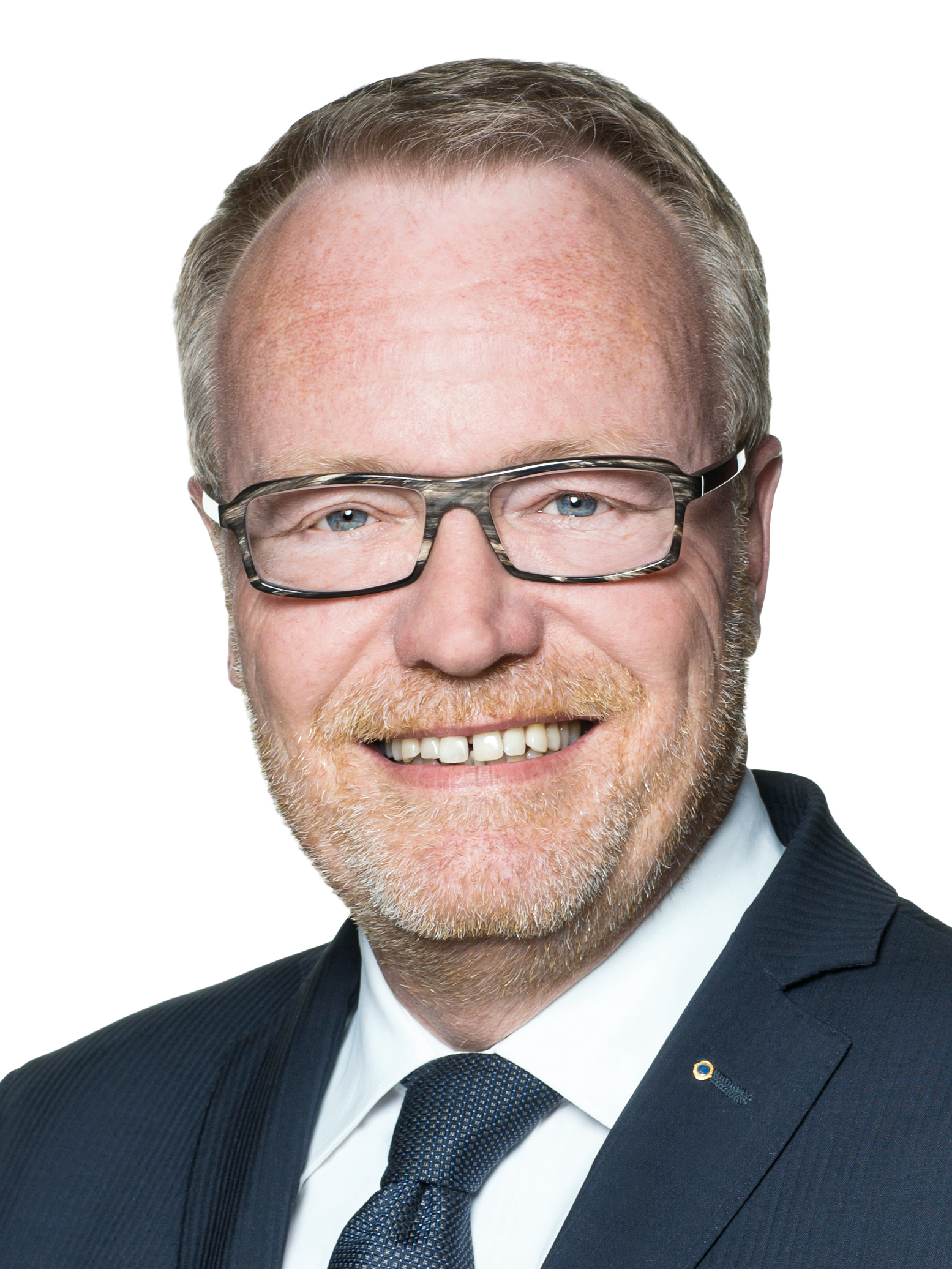
- Egloff in 2015

Member of the Swiss National Council for the Canton of Zurich
- In office 5 December 2011 – 1 December 2019

Member of the Cantonal Council of Zurich
- In office 8 May 1995 – 9 May 2011

Personal details
- Born: 27 November 1959 Zurich, Switzerland
- Died: 5 October 2026 (aged 66)
- Party: SVP
- Education: University of Zurich (Lic.)
- Occupation: Schoolteacher; Legal secretary

Hans Egloff (27 November 1959 – 5 October 2026) was a Swiss politician of the Swiss People's Party (SVP).

Egloff served in the Cantonal Council of Zurich from 1995 to 2011 and in the National Council from 2011 to 2019.

Egloff died on 5 October 2026, at the age of 66.
