= David Mouradian =

Armenian writer (1951–2026)

- Դավիթ Մուրադյան
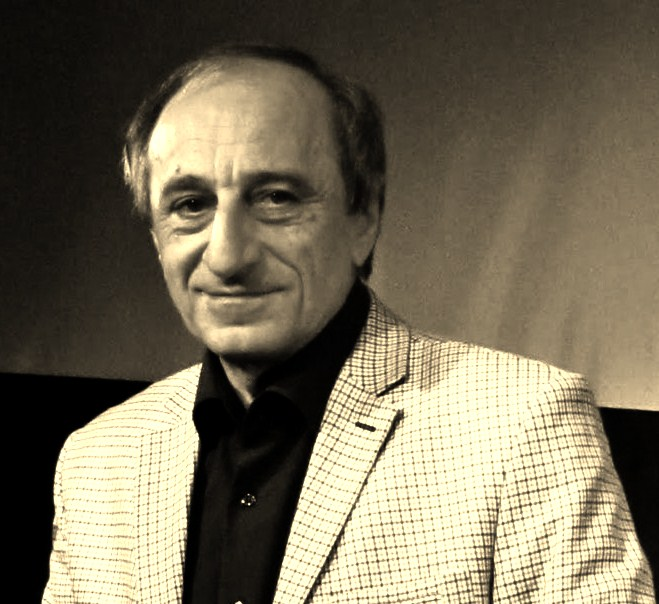
- Mouradian in 2012
- Born: 12 December 1951; Yerevan, Armenian SSR, USSR
- Died: 21 October 2026 (aged 74)
- Occupations: Novelist, poet, playwright, writer, and teacher.

David Mouradian (Armenian: Դավիթ Մուրադյան; 12 December 1951 – 21 October 2026) was an Armenian philologist, writer, film critic and publicist. He was a lecturer at the Yerevan State University and the Institute of film and theater since 1986.

== Life and career ==
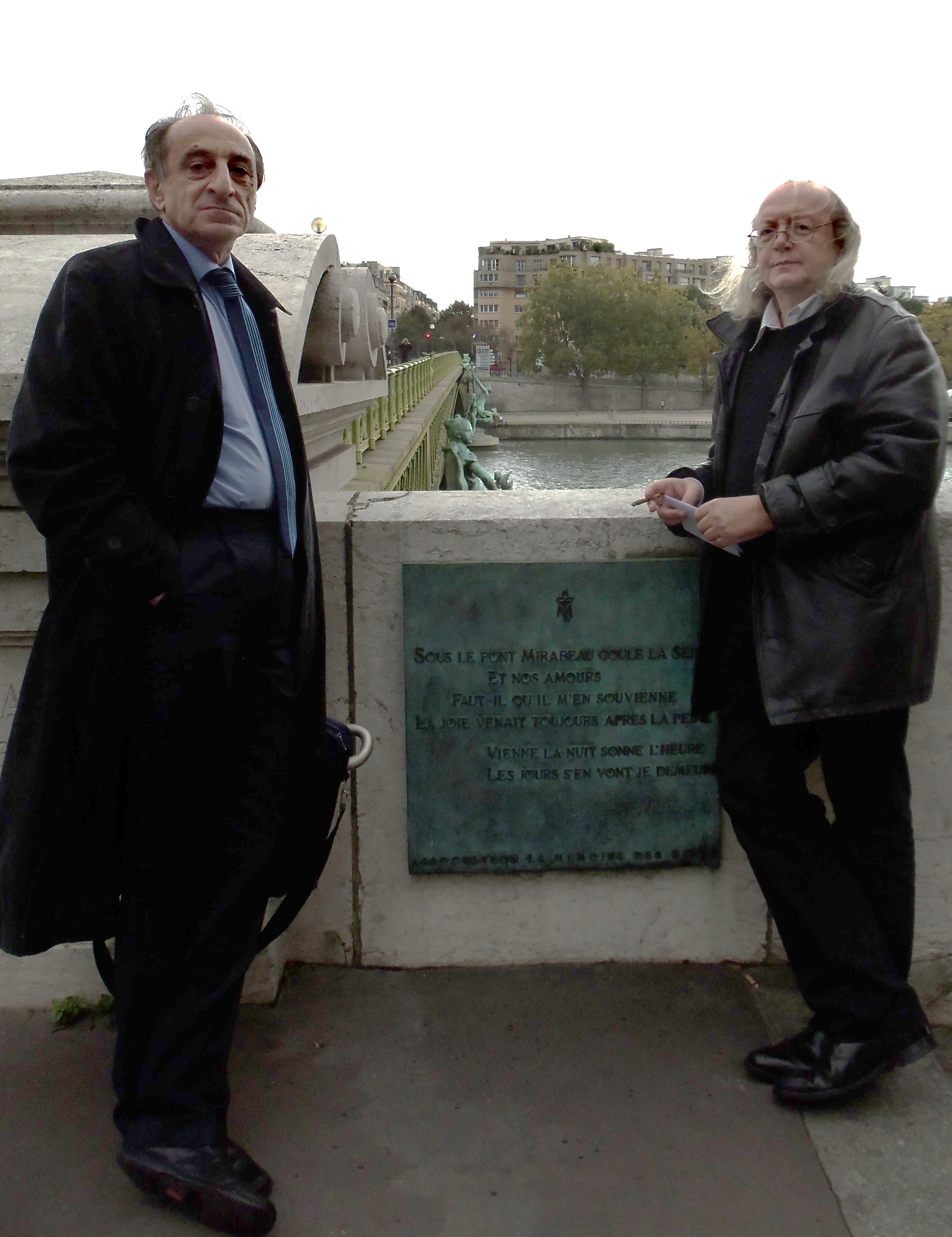
David Mouradian and Serge Venturini, 2012

David Mouradian was a graduate of the Yerevan State University, the Faculty of Philology. His work as a novelist began to be published in 1969 in the magazine for children pioneer. His first published book, I want to tell you was in 1976. From 1977 to 1999, he worked in film studio Armenfilm as a writer. He covered television programs on cinema and arthouse which he was secretary between 1994 and 1996, and was re-elected in 2001.

He is best known for the short novel, written in 2003, Our Old Piano, which served as a scenario for a play and aired on Téléfilm 2.

Mouradian died on 21 October 2026, aged 74.
