= Messan Hilaire Locoh-Donou =

Togolese architect and hotelier (died 2026)

- Died: 4 October 2026; Lomé, Togo
- Education: École nationale supérieure des Beaux-Arts
- Occupations: Architect, urban planner, lecturer, hotelier
- Practice: AUBA (founded 1973)
- Buildings: Former headquarters of the BTCI, Lomé

Messan Hilaire Locoh-Donou (died 4 October 2026) was a Togolese architect, urban planner, lecturer and hotelier.

== Career ==
Locoh-Donou graduated from the École nationale supérieure des Beaux-Arts in Paris and returned to Togo to work as an architect and urban planner. In 1973 he founded AUBA in Lomé, a firm specialising in architecture, urban planning and technical studies. His works include the former headquarters of the Banque togolaise pour le commerce et l'industrie (BTCI). He taught architecture for several years at the École africaine des métiers de l'architecture et de l'urbanisme (EAMAU) in Lomé. From 1986 to 1996 he was president of the National Order of Architects of Togo (Ordre national des architectes du Togo).

== Hotel Eda-Oba ==
Locoh-Donou founded the Eda-Oba hotel in Lomé, with around 200 rooms, restaurants and conference facilities. After tourism collapsed during the COVID-19 pandemic, the hotel suspended its operations in 2021.

== Personal life and death ==
Locoh-Donou served as president of the Rotary Club of Lomé and as governor of Rotary International District 9100 for 1998–1999. He died in Lomé on 4 October 2026.
