= Mark Pryor (author) =

British-American lawyer and novelist (1967–2026)

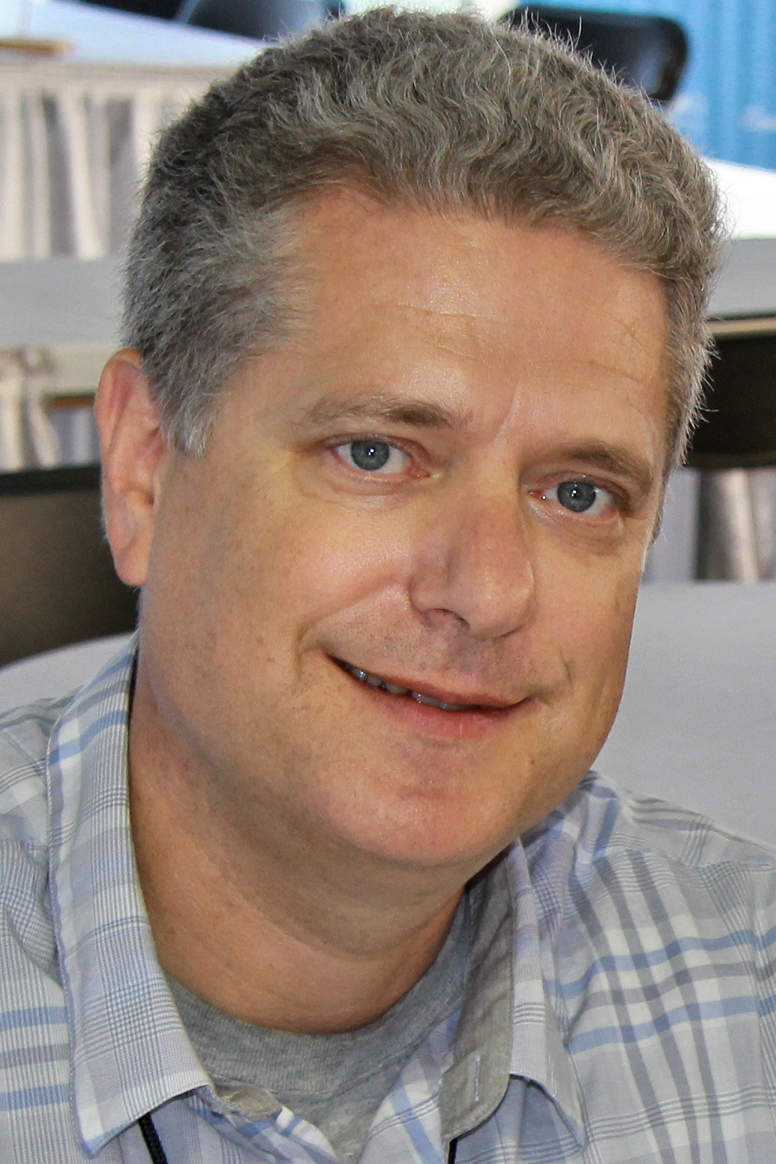
- Mark Pryor at the 2014 Texas Book Festival
- Born: May 8, 1967; Welwyn Garden City, Hertfordshire, England
- Died: October 8, 2026 (aged 59)
- Education: University of North Carolina at Chapel Hill (BA); Duke University (JD)
- Occupation: Novelist
- Writing career
- Genre: Crime
- Website: www.markpryorbooks.com

Mark Pryor (May 8, 1967 – October 8, 2026) was a British-American mystery writer and criminal defense attorney for Cofer and Connelly. He is best known for his mystery novels featuring Hugo Marston, a former FBI agent from Texas, and now head of security at the U.S. Embassy in Paris. Pryor was also the author of the nonfiction book, As She Lay Sleeping, based on the 1985 cold case murder of Natalie Antonetti (the mother of Johnny Goudie) that he successfully prosecuted in 2011. He appeared on CBS News' "48 Hours" and Discovery Channel's "Discovery ID: Cold Blood" discussing the case. Pryor was also the creator of the true-crime blog D.A. Confidential.

== Life and career ==
Pryor grew up in Hertfordshire, England. He earned a journalism degree and became the crime reporter for the Daily Gazette (Colchester), Essex. In 1994, he moved to Chapel Hill, North Carolina, where his mother is from and returned to education. Pryor received a bachelor's degree from the University of North Carolina Chapel Hill journalism school in 1999 and a Juris Doctor degree from Duke University in 2002. After graduating, he moved to Dallas, Texas, to practice civil law. In 2006, he moved to Austin, Texas to accept a position with the Travis County District Attorney’s Office.

He resided in Austin with his wife and three children. Pryor died on October 8, 2026, at the age of 59.

== Publications ==
=== Hugo Marston Novels ===
- The Bookseller (2012) Seventh Street Books ISBN 978-1-61614-708-2
- The Crypt Thief (2013) Seventh Street Books ISBN 978-1-61614-785-3
- The Blood Promise (2014) Seventh Street Books ISBN 978-1-61614-815-7
- The Button Man (2014) Seventh Street Books ISBN 978-1-61614-994-9
- The Reluctant Matador (2015) Seventh Street Books ISBN 978-1-63388-002-3
- The Paris Librarian (2016) Seventh Street Books ISBN 978-1-63388-177-8
- The Sorbonne Affair (2017) Seventh Street Books ISBN 978-1-63388-261-4
- The Book Artist (2019) Seventh Street Books ISBN 978-1-63388-488-5
- The French Widow (2020) Seventh Street Books ISBN 978-1-64506-023-9

=== Inspector Henri Lefort Series ===
- Die Around Sundown (2022) Minotaur Books ISBN 978-1250824820
- The Dark Edge of Night (2023) Minotaur Books ISBN 978-1250825049
- A Blood Red Morning (2024) Minotaur Books ISBN 978-1250330604

=== Other Novels ===
- Hollow Man (2015) Seventh Street Books ISBN 978-1-63388-086-3
- Dominic: A Hollow Man Novel (2018) Seventh Street Books ISBN 1-63388-365-5
- The Most Mysterious Bookshop in Paris (2026) Kensington Books ISBN 978-1496756404

=== Nonfiction ===
- Faith, Grace and Heresy: The Biography of Rev. Charles M. Jones (2002) Writer's Showcase Press 978-0-59521-718-2
- As She Lay Sleeping (2013) New Horizon Press ISBN 978-0-88282-428-4
