= 2026 in Israel =

- Decades: 2000s; 2010s; 2020s
- See also: History of Israel; Timeline of Israeli history; List of years in Israel

Events of the year 2026 in Israel.

== Incumbents ==
- President of Israel – Isaac Herzog
- Prime Minister of Israel – Benjamin Netanyahu
- President of the Supreme Court – Yitzhak Amit

== Events ==
=== January ===
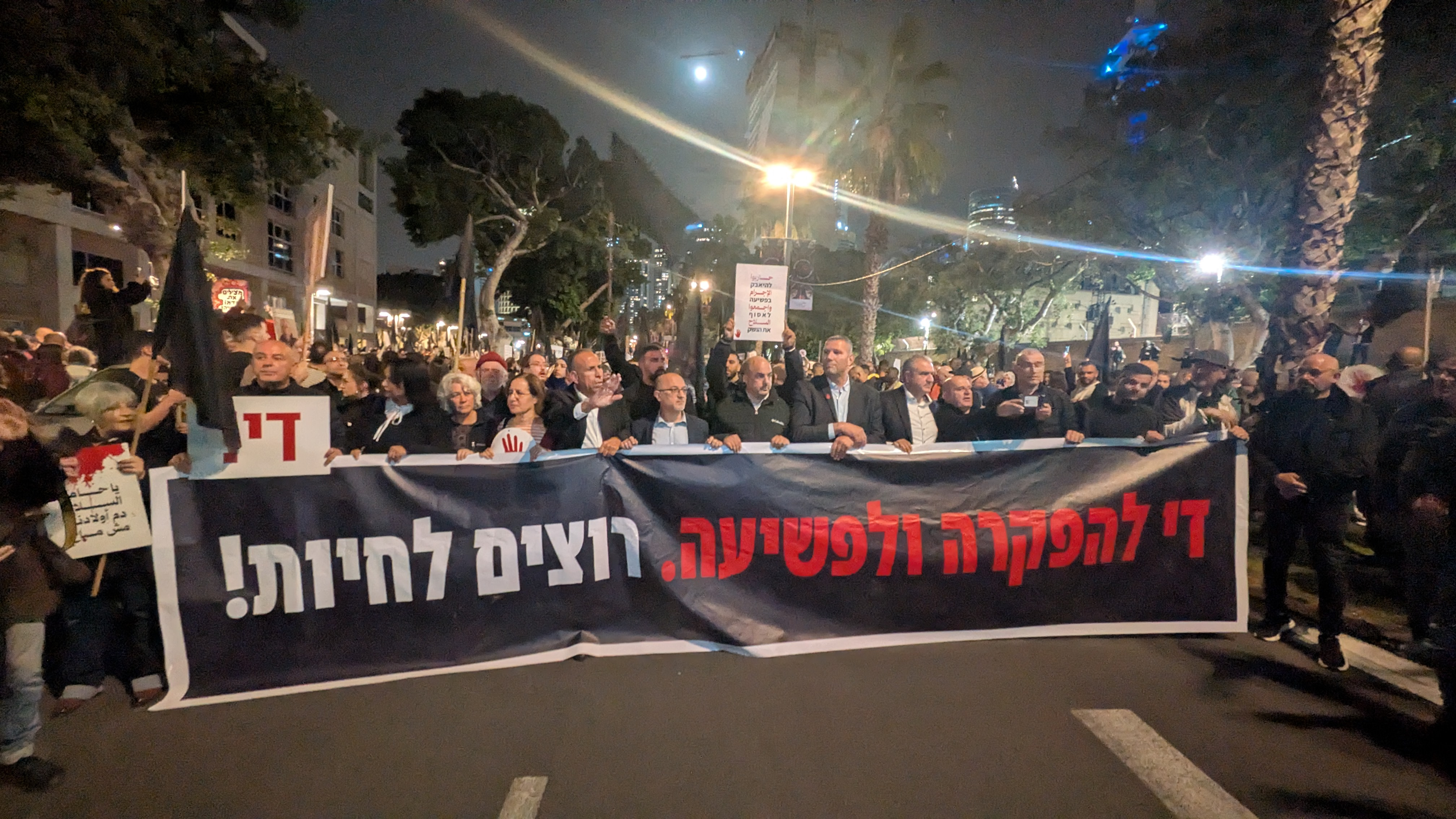
Demonstration in Tel Aviv against rising crime and the lack of government enforcement in Israeli Arab society, 31 January

- 1 January — Israel orders the banning effective 1 March of 37 humanitarian agencies from operating in the Gaza Strip for failing to comply with its revised regulations on the disclosure of detailed information on their Palestinian staff.
- 4 January — A Bedouin man is killed in an overnight police raid in Tirabin al-Sana.
- 5 January –
  - The Ministry of Communications approves the delivery of equipment necessary to upgrade Palestinian cellular networks from 3G to 4G in the West Bank.
  - United States-mediated talks between Israel and Syria are held to revive the 1974 disengagement framework resume after a several-month hiatus, with Syria pressing for an Israeli withdrawal from territory entered after the fall of the Assad regime.
  - Three Arab Israelis are killed in two separate shootings in Nazareth and Kafr Qara.
- 6 January –
  - Foreign minister Gideon Sa'ar visits Somaliland for the first time since Israel recognized its independence the month prior.
  - A bus strikes a group protesting against Haredi conscription into the IDF in Jerusalem, killing one and injuring three others.
- 13 January – Israel withdraws from seven United Nations-affiliated agencies over their perceived anti-Israel bias or ineffectiveness.
- 14 January – The United States announces the start of the second phase of the Gaza peace plan.
- 19 January –Two children are killed and 55 others are injured following an incident at a daycare in Romema, Jerusalem.
- 20 January – Israel starts demolishing buildings at the main UNRWA compound in East Jerusalem.
- 21 January – National security minister Itamar Ben-Gvir allows the issuance of gun licences to residents of 18 Israeli settlements in the West Bank.
- 26 January – The body of Ran Gvili is recovered by the IDF from northern Gaza, ending the Gaza war hostage crisis.
- 30 January –
  - Ariel Seidman, the Israeli chargé d'affaires to South Africa, is expelled from Israel's embassy in Pretoria in response to insults against president Cyril Ramaphosa. Israel responds by banning South African representative to Palestine Shaun Byneveldt from its territory.
  - The United States approves four weapons purchase agreements to Israel valued at $6.67 billion.
- 31 January – Around 40,000 people protest in Habima Square, Tel Aviv, against perceived government neglect against Arab citizens of Israel amid rising crime rates.

=== February ===
- 2 February – A French judge issues arrest warrants for two French-Israeli citizens, accusing them of "complicity and incitement to genocide" for blocking humanitarian aid trucks en route to Gaza.
- 4 February – Twelve people, including IDF troops, are charged by the Ministry of Justice with assisting Hamas by smuggling hundreds of thousands of dollars worth of products into Gaza.
- 6 February – A bus crashes into a kiosk in Ramat Gan, injuring 10 people, one seriously.
- 8 February – The security cabinet passes bills to increase Israel's control over its occupied territories in the West Bank, which are widely denounced as efforts to annex the territory.
- 10 February – Venezuela delivers its first crude oil shipment to Israel in several years.
  - Two female IDF soldiers are attacked by a crowd of Haredi men in Bnei Brak, resulting in 23 arrests.
- 23 February – Israel designates the online Palestinian media platforms Al Asima News, Quds Plus, Alquds Albawsala, Maraj and Maydan Alquds as terrorist organizations, accusing connections to Hamas.
- 25 February –
  - Somaliland appoints Mohamed Omar Hagi Mohamoud as its first ambassador to Israel.
  - Indian prime minister Narendra Modi becomes the first recipient of the Medal of the Knesset, the Knesset's highest award, during his visit to Israel.
- 27 February – The Supreme Court of Israel allows aid groups barred for refusing to comply with new Israeli regulations to continue operating in Gaza and other Palestinian territories while it considers the case.
- 28 February – 2026 Israeli–United States strikes on Iran:
  - Israel and the United States launch a major attack on Iran with the stated goal of regime change(debatable) , the attacks successfully eliminate its supreme leader Ali Khamenei, and a number of other high ranking officials.
  - The Cabinet of Israel declares a state of emergency and closes country’s airspace.

=== March ===
- 1 March – Eight people are killed and 28 others are wounded in an Iranian ballistic missile strike on Beit Shemesh, Jerusalem District.
- 2 March – 2026 Israeli–United States strikes on Iran: Hezbollah carries out an aerial attack on Israel in retaliation for the assassination of Iran's supreme leader, Ali Khamenei. In response, Israel launches a military operation in Lebanon.
- 3 March –
  - Following a series of drone and rocket attacks by Hezbollah, the IDF launch a ground offensive into Lebanon, capturing several positions along the Israel—Lebanon border.
  - The Israeli Air Force strikes the Presidential Administration of Iran and Supreme National Security Council buildings in Tehran, Iran, with "multiple munitions".
- 4 March –
  - The IDF reports that an Israeli F-35 had shot down an Iranian YAK-130 over Tehran, the first time the IAF shot down an aircraft since 1985.
- 6 March – An Israeli IAI Heron drone is shot down over Khuzestan province, Iran.
- 8 March – Joint airstrikes by Israel and the United States are carried out against oil facilities in Tehran and other Iranian cities, killing at least four truck drivers and causing large fires.
- 11 March – Spain permanently withdraws its ambassador to Israel and terminates the position after a worsening of bilateral diplomatic relations.
  - Hezbollah launches over 100 rockets at Israel, injuring five civilians in Upper Galilee.
- 12 March –
  - A rabbi is seriously injured in a stabbing in Ramat Gan, as police suspect a terrorist motive.
  - The IDF drops charges against five soldiers accused of raping a Palestinian prisoner at the Sde Teiman detention camp.
  - Hezbollah launches over 200 rockets and 20 UAVs at northern Israel, injuring two people.
- 13 March –
  - At least 58 people are injured by Iranian ballistic missile strikes on northern Israel.
- 16 March –
  - The IAF carries out airstrikes on the Iranian Space Research Center in Tehran, saying that it was being used for potential space warfare activities against Israeli satellites.
  - The IDF's 91st Division launches a ground operation against Hezbollah in Southern Lebanon, expanding a buffer zone along the border.
- 17 March – Israel assassinates Ali Larijani, Iran's Secretary of the Supreme National Security Council and Basij commander Gholamreza Soleimani, following airstrikes on Tehran.
- 18 March –
  - Two people are killed in an Iranian missile strike in Ramat Gan.
  - Israel assassinates Iranian intelligence minister Esmaeil Khatib following airstrikes on Tehran.
- 20 March – The IDF strikes Syrian military sites, including command and control centres and supply depots, in the south of the country, in response to Syrian government attacks on the Druze population.
- 21 March – More than 31 people are injured, including a 10-year-old, by Iranian ballistic missile attacks on Dimona. Iran says it targeted Shimon Peres Negev Nuclear Research Center.
- 22 March –
  - Fifteen people are injured in central Israel in Iranian missile attacks.
  - One person is killed after a rocket fired from Lebanon struck a vehicle near Israel's northern border, marking the first reported Israeli fatality from cross-border fire since hostilities with Hezbollah resumed earlier in March.
- 24 March –
  - Shrapnel from an Iranian ballistic missile wounds three people, including a two-month-old baby, in a Bedouin community in the Negev.
  - Hezbollah rocket fire kills a woman and injures two in Northern Israel.
  - Defense minister Israel Katz states that the IDF will control a "security zone" up to the Litani River in southern Lebanon until the threat of Hezbollah is removed.
- 25 March –
  - Israel claims to have assassinated Alireza Tangsiri, the commander of Iran's Islamic Revolutionary Guard Corps Navy.
  - Nine people are injured in Israel after seven salvos of ballistic missiles by Iran.
  - One person is killed and 11 are injured by Hezbollah rocket fire in Nahariya.
- 26 March –
  - Nine people are injured in after seven salvos of ballistic missiles by Iran.
  - One person is killed and 11 are injured by Hezbollah rocket fire in Nahariya.
- 27 March –
  - One man is killed and several are injured by Iranian ballistic missile attacks on central and southern Israel.
  - The IAF strikes a uranium processing facility in Yazd, Iran. There are no casualties or radiation leaks, according to the Atomic Energy Organization of Iran.
- 28 March –
  - The Houthis join the 2026 Iran war, conducting a ballistic missile attack towards Israel and triggering air raid sirens in Beersheba.
  - Around 18 people are arrested during nationwide anti-war protests against the Iran war, including 13 in Tel Aviv and 5 in Haifa. Protests are also held in Jerusalem and Beersheba.
- 29 March –
  - For the first time, the Israel Police block the Latin Patriarch of Jerusalem, Pierbattista Pizzaballa, from entering the Church of the Holy Sepulchre during Palm Sunday.
  - An Iranian missile hits the Makhteshim chemical plant in southern Israel. A warning for the leakage of hazardous materials is issued for the immediate vicinity of the site.
- 30 March –
  - The IDF withdraws the Netzah Yehuda Battalion from the West Bank after its members detain and assault a CNN crew in Tayasir.
  - The Knesset passes a bill allowing for mandatory executions of Palestinians convicted of terrorist attacks that kill Israelis.
  - A missile barrage from Iran and Lebanon causes a fire at the BAZAN oil refinery in Haifa.

=== April ===
- 1 April –
  - Ten people are injured, including a girl from Bnei Brak in critical condition, after a missile barrage from Iran.
  - Israeli airstrikes kill seven people, including the Hezbollah commander for Iraq, and injure dozens in Beirut and nearby Khalde.
  - The IDF reports the interception of a missile launched by the Houthis.
- 2 April – An Iranian ballistic missile strike damages a drone factory in Petah Tikva.
- 4 April – An Iranian missile hits the vicinity of the IDF's HaKirya headquarters in Tel Aviv.
- 5 April –
  - An Iranian missile hits a residential building in Haifa, killing four people and injuring nine others, including one seriously.
  - The IDF says that it has killed Mohammad Reza Ashrafi Kahi, the head of trade at the Islamic Revolutionary Guard Corps's oil headquarters, in an airstrike in Tehran.
- 6 April
  - Iranian missiles hit 15 areas in Israel. A woman is seriously injured in Petah Tikva, while two other people are injured in Tel Aviv. In Haifa, four people are also slightly injured by a cluster bomb.
  - Left-wing activists protest outside the U.S. Embassy in Tel Aviv to call for an end to the war in Iran.
- 8 April – Hezbollah fires rockets towards northern Israel in response to the 8 April 2026 Lebanon attacks.
- 14 April – The first direct diplomatic negotiations between Israel and Lebanon since 1993 are held in Washington, DC.
- 17 April – A 10-day truce between Lebanon and Israel comes into effect.
- 19 April – Argentine President Javier Milei begins a three-day state visit to Israel to inaugurate the first El Al flight between Israel and Argentina, reinforce Argentina's support for Israel and the US in the Iran war, and advance the plans to move the Argentine embassy from Tel Aviv to Jerusalem.
- 22 April – Ethiopian-Israeli pizza worker Yemanu Binyamin Zelka is stabbed to death by a group of teenagers in Petah Tikva.
- 23 April – President Trump says that Israel and Lebanon agreed to a three week extension of the ceasefire.
- 24 April – Prime Minister Netanyahu announces that he had been treated for early stage-prostate cancer.
- 26 April – Israel appoints its first ambassador to Somaliland.

=== May ===
- 13 May – The ruling coalition files a resolution to dissolve the Knesset, after Prime Minister Netanyahu told the ultra-Orthodox parties that the draft exemption law would not be approved before the elections.
- 15 May –
  - The U.S. State Department announces that Israel and Lebanon agreed to extend their ceasefire for 45 days, and that more specific political and security negotiations will begin on May 29 and June 2, respectively.
  - Izz al-Din al-Haddad, the leader of Hamas in the Gaza Strip, is killed in an Israeli airstrike in Rimal, Gaza City.
- 16 May – Noam Bettan, representing Israel in the Eurovision Song Contest 2026, finishes in second place with 343 overall points with his song "Michelle".
- 18 May – Hezbollah claims that it hit the vehicle of the commander of the IDF 300th Brigade in Shomera.
- 19 May –
  - The Israeli Navy intercepts a flotilla boat taking part in the Global Sumud Flotilla for Gaza Freedom that was headed for Gaza to break the blockade.
  - Somaliland announces that the country will open an embassy in Jerusalem to strengthen its ties with Israel, for now the only country to recognize Somaliland as an independent nation. Israel announces that it will reciprocrate by opening an embassy in Hargeisa.
- 20 May –
  - The Knesset passes a preliminary vote to dissolve itself.
  - After Israeli forces intercepted the Global Sumud Flotilla, Itamar Ben-Gvir releases videos showing him taunting detained activists. The footage showed activists kneeling with their hands tied behind their backs, while Ben-Gvir called for them to be imprisoned for a long period.
  - The U.S. Office of Foreign Assets Control removes sanctions on Francesca Albanese, the UN Special Rapporteur on occupied Palestinian territories, after district judge Richard J. Leon of the District of Columbia blocked measures imposed over Albanese's criticism of Israel and its actions in Gaza.
- 23 May — France bans Itamar Ben Gvir from entering the country, citing his “unspeakable” behavior against French and European Global Sumud Flotilla activists.
- 26 May — Mohammed Odeh, the leader of Hamas in the Gaza Strip, is killed in an Israeli airstrike.
- 29 May — The UN adds Israel to its blacklist for sexual violence in conflict zones for suspected sexual violence against Palestinians during the Gaza war.

=== June ===
- 1 June — Israel agrees not to hit Beirut's southern suburbs, and Hezbollah agrees not to attack Israel as part of a US proposal, with the cease-fire framework to be expanded to include entire Lebanon.
- 2 June – Israel reopens an embassy in Fiji for the first time in 30 years.
- 3 June — Israel and Lebanon agree to renew the ceasefire mediated by the US, and to establish "pilot zones".
- 4 June — Hezbollah rejects the truce deal announced the previous day and demands a comprehensive truce and full withdrawal of Israel from Lebanon.
- 5 June — Ireland prohibits Israeli National Security Minister Itamar Ben Gvir and finance minister Bezalel Smotrich from entering the country, citing behavior against 2026 Global Sumud Flotilla activists and anti-Palestinian statements.
- 7 June –
  - Iran launches ballistic missiles towards Israel, saying that it targeted Ramat David Airbase Israel says that it downed all the missiles.
  - One person is killed while five others are injured in a series of shootings carried out by a Palestinian-Israeli near Kokhav Yair. The gunman is later killed by police.
- 8 June — The IDF announces that it struck military sites in central and western Iran, with explosions being reported in Tehran, Isfahan, and Tabriz. This triggers an exchange of strikes between the two countries joined by the Houthis. Both countries halt military actions against each other later in the day.
- 9 June – France prohibits Israeli Finance Minister Bezalel Smotrich from entering the country, citing promotion of West Bank annexation and "re-colonization" in Gaza.
- 10–20 June – The 100th anniversary of Hebrew Book Week is marked with events in Tel Aviv–Jaffa's Sarona Park and Jerusalem's Safra Square and features book fairs, literary events, and the Bernstein Prize ceremony for emerging writers.
- 14 June — The US and Iran announce that they had reached an agreement to end the war between both countries and Israel and reopen the Strait of Hormuz.
- 19 June —
  - The United States announces that Israel and Hezbollah agreed to a ceasefire.
  - Lebanese conservationist and environmentalist Mona Khalil, a advocate for the protection of endangered sea turtles, dies from wounds sustained during an Israeli attack in southern Lebanon two weeks ago.
- 20 June —
  - Iran announces that the Strait of Hormuz is closed to traffic because of Israeli violations of the Islamabad Memorandum in Lebanon.
  - Prime minister Netanyahu states that Israeli troops will remain in southern Lebanon to protect Israel's northern border for as long as it is believed to be necessary.
- 21 June —
  - The IDF and Shin Bet confirm the assassination of PIJ commander Zaki Youssef Mahmoud Abu Mustafa, a participant in the kidnapping of 12-year-old Yagil Yaakov during the Nir Oz attack on October 7, 2023 and is also accused of training militants at the Nasser Hospital.
  - An Israeli airstrike kills Al Jazeera cameraman Ahmed Wishah.
  - Defense minister Israel Katz says that the IDF will not withdraw from the Beaufort Castle, Lebanon.
- 26 June — US Secretary of State Marco Rubio announces a framework deal between Israel and Lebanon that aims to achieve "lasting peace and security" through US mediation. The agreement asks for a cease-fire, with Hezbollah agreeing to terminate all hostilities and withdraw from southern Lebanon. Hezbollah later rejects it.
- 27 June — Two Arab-Israeli girls, aged 13, die after drowning in the Jordan River near Abu Snan.
- 28 June — The Israeli government votes overwhelmingly to recognise the Armenian genocide.
- 29 June — The IDF signs a $7 million contract for AI-powered radar to thwart Hezbollah drones.
- 30 June —
  - The IDF and Shin Bet announce the killing of PIJ commander Talal Jaber Mohammad Abd al-Aal, who was involved in taking hostages during the October 7 attacks including Rom Braslavski.
  - Israel announces that it improved the Iron Dome air defence system to better counter threats.

=== July ===
- 5 July — Prime Minister Netanyahu announces no reconstruction in Gaza until Hamas is disarmed and the strip is demilitarized.
- 8 July — The IDF discovers the grave of one of its soldiers killed in the 1948 Israeli War of Independence, who had been missing since the conflict.
- 13 July — The Knesset approves a quasi-constitutional Basic Law designating the study of the Torah a fundamental value of the country.
- 14 July —
  - The first day of direct negotiations and the sixth round of peace talks between Israel and Lebanon begins at the U.S. embassy in Rome, Italy.
  - The Knesset passes legislation prohibiting arrests of Haredi conscription dodgers.
- 15 July —
  - Israel sentences an IDF soldier to five years' imprisonment for working on behalf of Iran.
  - The Supreme Court suspends legislation prohibiting arrests of Haredi draft-evaders.
  - The Knesset approves a law weakening the powers of the attorney general.
  - Israeli Foreign Minister Gideon Sa'ar says that Israel and Colombia decided to restore relations.
  - The Knesset passes a legislation ensuring treatment for war trauma victims.
  - The US State Department states that Israel agreed to withdraw from pilot zones in southern Lebanon.
  - The IDF claims to have killed an Al-Qassam Brigades militant who participated in the abduction of Col. Asaf Hamami and two other soldiers during the October 7 attacks on Kibbutz Nirim.
- 16 July —
  - The Knesset passes legislation increasing gender segregation in academics.
  - The Knesset passes a media overhaul law, giving the government more regulatory control.
  - The Knesset enacts legislation on construction waste.
- 17 July —
  - The Knesset decides to prolong mandatory IDF service for males to 32 months.
  - The Knesset approves a party financing bill with a provision dissolving the chamber.
  - Prime Minister Netanyahu announces that an IDF reservist was detained for eight months in Thailand and freed after diplomatic initiatives.
- 19 July —
  - The Supreme Court freezes sections of the media overhaul law.
  - Defence Minister Israel Katz orders the IDF to remove an activist with the Brothers in Arms organization and a Democrats party primary candidate, from reserve military service, accusing him of calling for refusal to serve in the military.
  - Thousands of Religious Zionist settler activists, along with National Security Minister Itamar Ben Gvir and Finance Minister Bezalel Smotrich, as well as politicians from Prime Minister Netanyahu’s Likud party, march to the Gaza border as part of a demonstration organised by the Nachala settler group with the intention of resettling the strip and re-establishing Israel's Gush Katif settlement bloc.
- 20 July — The US announces that Israel handed over sections of its buffer zone in southern Lebanon to Lebanese control as part of the 2026 Israel–Lebanon ceasefire.
- 21 July — The Israeli Council for Higher Education, led by Education Minister Yoav Kisch prohibits officials in universities from making political statements.
- 22 July — The IDF detains Israeli settlers who crossed into territory that it occupies in Syria.
- 23 July
  - An Israeli is critically injured in a stabbing in the vicinity of Elon Moreh. The two Palestinian assailants are shot and killed.
  - An Israeli is moderately injured in a stabbing by a Palestinian Authority police officer in the vicinity of Ganim. The assailant is subdued.
  - Mossad announces that it prevented the Iranian regime's attempt to infiltrate spies into Israel and target top leaders.
- 24 July —
  - Two Israelis including a soldier and a Hagmar reservist and four Palestinian are killed, two other Israelis are critically and moderately injured and four Palestinians are injured, three seriously in a shooting in the vicinity of Havat Gilad after confrontations broke out.
  - Israel Police and the Shin Bet launches a large manhunt for a 4-year-old boy, who went missing on Hofit Beach in Ashkelon the day before. The child is later found alive.
  - The United States imposes a 12.5% tariff on Israel, citing the presence of alleged forced labour in the supply chain.
- 26 July — The Israeli security cabinet approves certain legal moves allowing the restricted entry of the International Stabilization Force into Gaza as part of the Board of Peace-led plan.
- 27 July — Sixty Palestinian detainees are released by Israel into Gaza.
- 28 July —
  - The IDF and Israeli Civil Administration demolish a Palestinian house erected without a permit in Ein al-Hilweh in the West Bank, despite the Supreme Court of Israel's interim ruling urging the state not to demolish the structure until it responds.
  - The second female IDF soldier commits suicide in three days.
  - Defence Minister Israel Katz lifts an administrative detention order on a settler extremist who allegedly undressed a Palestinian victim, zip-tied his genitals, and displayed him in Khirbet Humsa al-Fawqa in March.
  - A 75-year-old veteran IDF soldier is injured after being attacked for removing a poster that urged for the release of Yigal Amir, the far-right murderer who assassinated Prime Minister Yitzhak Rabin.
- 29 July — Prime Minister Netanyahu directs Israel's defense sector to produce its own warplane within a decade.
- 30 July — A Haaretz ad campaign is pulled from billboards throughout central Israel after pressure from a Likud lawyer.
- 31 July — The IDF closes a case into an assault on three Palestinian men in the West Bank by settlers and soldiers shortly after the 7 October attacks, during which two of them were urinated on, one had cigarettes placed on his body, and another was sexually assaulted by an assailant who attempted to sodomise him, after failing to establish sufficient evidence connecting specific settlers and soldiers to the event.

=== August ===
- 2 August —
  - Fourteen IDF soldiers are sentenced to 30 days in jail for leaving the Sde Teiman base without permission.
  - Israel implements rules requiring graphic pictures on all tobacco and smoking goods.
  - The Israel women's national lacrosse team wins bronze at the World Lacrosse Championships.
- 4 August —
  - Four more IDF soldiers from the Givati Brigade's Tzabar Battalion are imprisoned and dismissed from service for deserting the Sde Teiman base.
  - The government orders the IDF not to launch strikes in Gaza without the authorization of IDF chief of staff Lt. Gen. Eyal Zamir, following a US request to limit Israel's operations in Gaza, allowing forces to strike without such approval only in "imminent danger".
- 6 August —
  - Gilad Erdan, Israel's former UN representative, launches a new right-wing party.
  - Following a failed plot to overthrow the Iranian regime, Mossad chief Roman Gofman dismisses two senior agents.
- 7 August — Lebanon and Israel agree on a shortlist of states that could send forces to verify Hezbollah disarmament.
- 8 August — For the sixth week in a row, ultra-orthodox Israelis clash with secular Israelis, including dozens of Democrats party activists, outside a café in central Jerusalem after it opened on Shabbat.
- 9 August —
  - The IDF and Shin Bet admit a special mission to target and kill all 7 October militants, adding that over 2,700 out of an estimated 5,000 militants who took part in the attacks have been confirmed by the IDF to have been killed.
  - Prime Minister Netanyahu declares Israel's rejection of the agreement drafted by President Trump's Gaza Board of Peace.
- 10 August —
  - Israeli academic Haim Sompolinsky is awarded the Dirac Medal by the International Centre for Theoretical Physics.
  - Israel announces a new initiative with the goal of boosting sheltering benefits for IDF reservists, with around 20,000 subsidised apartments or land parcels available over the next two years.
  - Colombia recognizes Israeli sovereignty over the Golan Heights.
- 11 August —
  - The ultra-Orthodox Hasmonean Brigade's first reserve unit is declared operational.
  - Israel and Venezuela resume consular relations for the first time since 2009.
- 12 August —
  - The remains of a Jewish man who was killed while escaping a Cypriot internment camp in 1948 are found in a cemetery in Haifa.
  - The Supreme Court rules that the state attorney can deal with the investigation into the leak of the Sde Teiman gang rape video, rejecting Justice Minister Yariv Levin's appeal.
- 13 August —
  - Settlers move into the reconstructed Ganim settlement in the West Bank.
  - The mandate of the European Union Border Assistance Mission to Rafah and the European Union Police Mission for the Palestinian Territories at the Rafah crossing is extended by Israel until the end of June 2027.
- 14 August —
  - Israeli Defence Minister Israel Katz orders the transfer of all enforcement powers against Israeli settlers in the West Bank from the IDF to the Israel Police.
- 16 August — The Justice Ministry's Internal Investigations Department closes a case involving the use of a strip search to deter a 19-year-old male anti-Iran war protester.
  - For the first time, Jewish prayer books are permitted on the Temple Mount.
  - The Israeli marathon team wins gold at the European Athletics Championships.
  - Israel and Honduras sign an agreement to boost defence operation.
  - The Israel Antiquities Authority announces the discovery of an early Islamic-era industrial and commercial complex from the seventh and eighth century CE during a routine salvage excavation ahead of the construction of a new bus station in Ramat Gan.
- 17 August —
  - Prime Minister Netanyahu's office announces that he agreed to organize "working groups" on Gaza demilitarization and humanitarian needs during a meeting with White House and Board of Peace representatives. The meeting also concludes with a deal to allow the IDF to continue conduct targeted strikes in Gaza for now.
  - A seven-year-old child is killed and a child is moderately injured in a stabbing in Beit Shemesh.
  - Israel halts all weapons exports to Qatar and all maintenance and supporting efforts connected to prior sales, calling it "an evil state" which works against the country and citing its hosting of Hamas leaders for years, as well as alleged attempts to influence Israeli public opinion, including paying Prime Minister Netanyahu's aides. (Note: Israel has no diplomatic relations with Qatar and has not sold any systems to it directly. However, Israel has supplied Qatar hundreds of millions of dollars' worth of technology that was part of bigger American-delivered systems, including air defense, night vision, and advanced avionics.)
  - Thirty-five Palestinian prisoners are released by Israel to Gaza.
- 18 August —
  - Six Thai workers are wounded in an explosion from an old ammunition in Metula.
  - The body of Sgt. Yehuda Katz, the last Israeli MIA from the 1982 Battle of Sultan Yacoub, is recovered by the IDF.
- 19 August — Itamar Ben Gvir extends gun license eligibility to nine communities in the Tel Aviv area.
- 20 August —
  - Police state that they uncovered an international network which brought women for prostitution and detained three people following a months-long undercover "investigation across continents."
  - A work stoppage is held at the Ben Gurion Airport.
  - The Central District Court overturns an order restricting an IDF reservist who is also an activist with the left-wing "Looking the Occupation in the Eye" organization from Khirbet al-Tawil.
  - The Supreme Court overturns the government's decision to shut down Army Radio.
- 21 August —
  - Jerusalem Light Rail inaugurates the Green Line, its major extension in 15 years.
  - Democrats MK Rabbi Gilad Kariv states that police banned party workers and Palestinians, but not extremist Hilltop Youth settlers from Al-Maniya.
  - At least five people are injured in attacks in towns throughout Israel.
  - Turkey issues an international arrest warrant for Netanyahu over the interception of the Gaza Freedom Flotilla.
- 23 August —
  - An agreement to ease congestion at Ben Gurion International Airport is agreed by the Israel Airports Authority and workers.
  - The government orders the IDF to execute a severe military response after several kites believed to have originated from Gaza are found in the vicinity of Nahal Oz.
  - The Caucasus Jewish mafia's chief in Israel is shot dead in the vicinity of Caesarea.
  - A temporary injunction is issued by the Supreme Court, blocking appointments to a police watchdog backed by the government.
  - A new Haredi party is launched by the Deputy Mayor of Beit Shemesh.
  - Israel imposes an entry ban against Swedish MEPs Jonas Sjöstedt and Hanna Gedin on charges of anti-state activities.
- 24 August —
  - Authorities announce the discovery of the wreckage of the cargo vessel Altalena, which was sunk during the 1948 War of Independence on the orders of then-prime minister David Ben-Gurion.
  - Israir gets final FAA clearance for US flights.
  - A Reform synagogue in Ramat HaSharon is vandalized, the second such incident in ten days.
- 25 August —
  - Prime Minister Netanyahu orders the evacuation of the UNRWA compound in Kafr 'Aqab neighborhood of East Jerusalem, blaming the agency for the 7 October attacks.
  - Foreign Minister Gideon Sa'ar orders to "immediately expel" Dutch representatives from the International Gaza Support Center, citing their ban of trade with Israeli settlements.
  - The right-wing "People of Israel" party is launched by retired IDF general Ofer Winter with a slate that includes right-wing Arab-Israeli influencer Yoseph Haddad.
- 27 August — Prime Minister Netanyahu calls off the IDF opening of the Erez border crossing.
- 29 August — Shin Bet confirms that it urgently brought Yair Netanyahu to Israel from Miami because of an Iranian threat.
- 30 August —
  - Bnei Brak Municipality acknowledges that it blocked the entrance to a secular neighborhood on the outskirts of the predominantly ultra-Orthodox city during Shabbat.
  - A man is killed and another seriously injured in nearby shootings in Jaffa as part of a crime wave in Israel's Arab community.
  - Thirteen Palestinian prisoners are released by Israel into Gaza.
  - Sixteen Givati Brigade soldiers are sentenced to several days in jail for refusing to enter an APC with a woman paramedic for a Gaza operational activity.
  - An unprecedented closure of all but one of Israel's six desalination stations occurs due to marine algae.
- 31 August —
  - A record €3 billion weapons deal is signed by Israel and Greece.
  - The Israel Discount Bank agrees to postpone its plan to cease providing correspondent banking services to Palestinian financial institutions amid international pressure from President Trump and the European Union.
  - A female soldier is appointed commander of the IDF Artillery Corps' 282nd Regiment for the first time.

=== September ===
- 1 September —
  - Under pressure from the Israeli government, 45,000 Palestinian children in schools in East Jerusalem are now required to study the Israeli curriculum.
  - Dozens of East Jerusalem private schools hold a strike on the first day of the new school year due to restrictions on teachers from the West Bank.
  - The lifting of reciprocal visa requirements between Colombia and Israel comes into effect.
  - The Israel Airports Authority and staff reach an agreement to resume normal operations.
- 2 September —
  - Israel demolishes Al-Tabban village in the West Bank, citing an Israeli Supreme Court verdict that incorrectly determined that Palestinians living in Firing Zone 918 did not live there permanently before the area was declared a firing zone. (Note: It also stated that Palestinians had no right to live there.)
  - Attorney General Gali Baharav-Miara allows Finance Minister Bezalel Smotrich to reduce the excise tax on gasoline.
  - Former Prime Minister Ehud Olmert confirms for the first time that Israel was behind the 2008 assassination of former Syrian leader Bashar al-Assad's top military adviser, Muhammad Suleiman, due to his responsibility in the construction and security of a Syrian nuclear facility in Deir ez-Zor that Israel struck in 2007.
- 3 September —
  - Prime Minister Netanyahu announces that five Lebanese civilians were released by Israel in exchange for information on Jewish remains in Lebanon.
  - The Supreme Court extends the freeze on the implementation of police investigation unit law.
  - The Israeli and Congolese foreign ministries jointly state that the DRC will move its embassy from Tel Aviv to Jerusalem.
  - The Supreme Court unanimously strikes down legislation that halted the arrests of ultra-orthodox IDF draft evaders, citing violations of the constitutional right to equality.
- 4 September — Israel frees two Lebanese prisoners and two Syrian citizens, via International Committee of the Red Cross as part of efforts to revive U.S.-backed peace talks signed between Israel and Lebanon.
- 5 September —
  - The Bnei Brak Municipality is granted permission by police to block traffic to a secular neighborhood on the outskirts of the predominantly Haredi city during Shabbat.
  - A coffee cart set up near a Jerusalem cafe that had caved in to ultra-orthodox protests is shut down by Municipal security.
- 6 September —
  - A 9-year-old boy is hospitalized with an infection from an extremely rare 'brain-eating organism' while swimming at Kursi Beach on the Sea of Galilee.
  - The government expands its fortification effort to 89 communities on the Lebanon border, saying that it is necessary to increase protection in the communities due to missile and drone fire from Lebanese militants.
  - In response to President Trump's pressure, Prime Minister Netanyahu orders the dismantling of unauthorized West Bank settler outposts.
  - The police positions officers outside the Cathedral of Saint James in attempt to crack down on Jewish passersby spitting at the structure.
- 7 September —
  - One Israeli is injured in a stabbing attack at a farming outpost in the vicinity of Osarin in the West Bank. The assailant is shot dead by the IDF.
  - Nauru inaugurates its first Israeli embassy in Jerusalem.
  - Israel releases 12 Palestinian prisoners into Gaza.
  - An IDF soldier commits suicide near a military outpost in the north, bringing the total number of soldiers killed by suicide since the start of the Gaza war to 69.
- 8 September —
  - The Supreme Court overturns the government's appointments to the Second Authority for Television and Radio.
  - Canada, Denmark, Finland, France, Iceland, Ireland, Norway, Poland, Portugal, Spain, Sweden and the UK sanction products from Israeli settlements in the West Bank. (Note: However, countries other than the UK, Canada, and France clarified that settlement trade restrictions are contingent on EU action.)
  - In response to UK sanctions, the Israeli government announces it will close the UK consulate in East Jerusalem, prohibits British forces from participating in the US-led mission for Gaza, and bans some British officials, notably former Labour leader Jeremy Corbyn, from entering the country. (Note: The list includes Fahad Ansari, a lawyer who has represented Hamas' political wing in court in the UK as it seeks to be removed from the list of proscribed terrorist organizations. Ansari is not British nor an MP.)
- 9 September — Finance Minister Bezalel Smotrich announces that Israel demolished 35 Palestinian structures in the West Bank to make way for new settlement roads.
- 10 September — The Democrats Party leader and former IDF Deputy Chief of Staff Yair Golan announces that he has sued Sara Netanyahu for NIS 2.55 million ($843,000) in defamation and damages after the prime minister's wife implied—without providing proof—that he was able to save lives during the Nova music festival massacre because he had prior knowledge of the 7 October attacks.
- 12 September —
  - Tamar Steinberg wins a gold medal in windsurfing at the iQFoil World Championships.
  - The IDF announces that a soldier who shot a Palestinian in the West Bank without reason breached rules of engagement.
- 15 September —
  - Gate Technologies is acquired by Ondas for up to $390 million.
  - Israeli and American authorities announce that the IDF chief Lt. Gen. Eyal Zamir met with Qatari Armed Forces Chief of Staff Lt. Gen. Jassim bin Mohammed bin Ahmed Al Mannai to discuss the Iranian regime despite bilateral tensions between the countries.
- 16 September —
  - Thirteen municipalities declare that they will not permit the use of live chickens in the traditional kapparot ritual prior to Yom Kippur.
  - An Israeli is sentenced to more than 13 years imprisonment for espionage on behalf of Iran.
  - The renewal of the Israeli government's land registration process in the West Bank, which was halted in 1968 is suspended by the Jerusalem District Court.
  - Channel 13's sale to a coalition critic is approved by the Second Authority for Television and Radio.
- 17 September —
  - Tel Aviv prohibits sex-segregated selichot services on beaches.
  - The chief intelligence officer of the Gaza Division during the 7 October attacks is formally dismissed from the IDF.
  - The Israel Antiquities Authority announces that a 25-ton mikveh from the Second Temple period was discovered in Kiryat Gat.
- 19 September — President Isaac Herzog pardons a soldier who killed a subdued Palestinian stabber in 2016.
- 20 September — An Israeli is killed in a gun attack in the vicinity of Halamish, with the Palestinian attacker later caught by the IDF.
- 22 September — RealSense, an Israel-based maker of AI vision technology for robots, agrees to sell to Cognex Corporation, an US machine vision maker, for over $600 million.
- 23 September —
  - Israeli authorities conduct demolitions in Jinba, citing an Israeli Supreme Court decision that incorrectly determined that Palestinians living in Firing Zone 918 did not live there permanently before the area was declared a firing zone. (Note: It also claimed that Palestinians had no right to live there.)
  - The Supreme Court postpones ruling on the state commission on the 7 October attacks until after the election.
  - The son of Israeli Ambassador to the US Yechiel Leiter is critically injured in a car ramming attack at the Maccabim Junction along Route 443 in the West Bank. The attacker is shot dead at the scene by the IDF.
- 24 September —
  - The Beersheba District Court adds 7.5 years to a man's prison sentence for using his role as a volunteer car-tow provider to steal five civilian cars left in Be'eri days after the 7 October attacks, bringing his total punishment to 13 years.
  - A 9-year-old boy in Haifa dies from encephalitis caused by an extremely rare "brain-eating organism" after swimming in the Sea of Galilee.
  - The IDF states that it detained several civilians attempting to enter into Gaza.
- 25 September — Sixty-one additional firms are added to an UN Human Rights Council list of firms which operate in Israeli West Bank settlements.
- 27 September —
  - Citing concerns about electioneering, the Attorney General of Israel orders a month-long delay in E1 proposals. (Note: In a minor change, the Attorney General later decided to not push back the deadline to submit bids for its tender, but rather only prevent the award of the tender until after the election.)
  - Defense Minister Israel Katz announces a "general closure" on the West Bank following a recommendation from the IDF, preventing Palestinian laborers from entering settlements amidst Sukkot.
  - Foreign Minister Gideon Sa'ar announces that Israel will revoke diplomatic privileges and Israel-issued credentials of Dutch diplomats in Ramallah due to a settlement trade ban.
  - Prime Minister Netanyahu orders the drafting of an ICC case against Turkish President Recep Tayyip Erdogan, citing Turkey's alleged persecution of Kurdish minorities and the Turkish government's alleged financial assistance for Hamas.
- 28 September — The IDF announces that it prevented an attempt to transfer munitions from Jordan to Israel with a drone.
- 29 September —
  - An Israeli airstrike kills Izz al-Din al-Beik, head of Al-Qassam Brigades in northern Gaza.
  - Likud announces that Prime Minister Netanyahu has sued media outlets Haaretz, Yedioth Ahronoth, Channel 12, and journalists Shlomi Eldar, Uri Misgav, Nadav Eyal, Barak Ravid, and Attila Somfalvi, among others, for NIS 2.6 million ($850,000) over recent reports that he received warnings from UAE President Sheikh Mohammed bin Zayed and Egypt's intelligence chief Abbas Kamel before the 7 October attacks.
- 30 September —
  - A US defense contract for counter-drone systems is awarded to the Israeli company SMARTSHOOTER.
  - A group of Israelis are rescued from Lalibela following days of being stuck due to fighting in Tigray.
  - Prime Minister Netanyahu announces new security measures in response to the Flydubai Flight 1073.

=== October ===
- 2 October —
  - One person is killed and another individual is wounded after a small aircraft crashes along Route 65, in the vicinity of Kafr Qara.
  - The Supreme Court overturns the Central Elections Committee's ban on Arab parties running for the 2026 Israeli legislative election.
- 4 October —
  - Following the IDF's recommendation, Defense Minister Israel Katz announces that crossings into the West Bank and Gaza will be closed during the days marking the 7 October attacks.
  - After the Flydubai Flight 1073 incident, the Israeli government admits that it does not independently vet foreign pilots. Prime Minister Netanyahu orders "a through review" of security procedures for international flights to Israel.
- 7–10 October – Israel participates in the Marrakech Airshow in Morocco for the first time since the Abraham Accords.
- 8 October — The Yesha Council announces that Defense Minister Israel Katz has ordered a ban on pro-Palestinian activists, whether Israeli or foreign, seeking to assist Palestinian olive growers in the West Bank during the harvest season, citing the Council's demand to prevent activists from "coming to the olive harvest area to create provocations and confrontations."
- 10 October — Raz Hershko finishes in 3rd place in the female over 78 kg (172 lb) category at the 2026 World Judo Championships in Azerbaijan.
- 12 October —
  - The Supreme Court directs the government and the IDF to disclose a timeframe for the return of Palestinians displaced in the northern section of the West Bank.
  - A Hezbollah unexploded munition detonation in the Ramim Ridge region kills one child and injures 24 others, including schoolchildren and teachers.
  - Foreign Minister Gideon Sa'ar and Albanian Foreign Minister Ferit Hoxha sign an enlarged government-to-government cooperation agreement.
- 13 October —
  - Defense Minister Israel Katz declares a nationwide six-month ban on fiber optic drones.
  - Israel returns 22 artifacts recovered from the illegal antiquities trade to Greece.
- 14 October —
  - Colombia inaugurates its embassy in Jerusalem.
  - Former Shin Bet director Ronen Bar files a NIS 3 million (approximately $975,000) defamation suit against Prime Minister Netanyahu, citing warnings issued prior to the 7 October attacks, for alleging that Bar was aware of the threat of a Hamas attack in the hours leading up to October 7, 2023, but chose not to inform Netanyahu.
  - Israel agrees to purchase 12 Boeing Apache helicopters.
  - A Bedouin man who joined the IDF to spy for the Mujahideen Brigades is sentenced to 24.5 years imprisonment.
- 15 October — Justice Yael Willner is appointed by the High Court to the Judicial Selection Committee.
- 16 October — Dov Lior, a hardline Orthodox rabbi, issues a halachic ruling permitting Jews to take Palestinian olives, framing it as a fulfillment of the conquering of the Land of Israel.
- 17 October — The Hebrew University of Jerusalem declares that it will rename its Mount Scopus campus for John Paulson following a record $250M donation.
- 23 October — Two IDF soldiers are killed and three other soldiers are wounded in a gun attack at the Judea Junction on Route 35. The two attackers are shot dead by the IDF at the scene. In response, Prime Minister Netanyahu orders a "full lockdown" of the West Bank.
- 24 October — Artem Dolgopyat finishes in third place in the floor exercise at the Artistic Gymnastics World Championships in Netherlands.
- 26 October – Israel agrees to provide an offshore patrol vessel to Cyprus.
- 27 October –
  - 2026 Israeli legislative election: The ruling coalition loses its parliamentary majority after winning 53 of 120 seats.
  - Intel agrees to acquire Israeli startup Classiq Technologies, in a deal estimated to be worth more than $2 billion.

=== November ===
- 2 November —
  - The IDF withdraws from several Hebron neighborhoods after an 11-day raid.
  - Elbit Systems and the Defense Ministry sign a $190 million contract for a new artillery training facility.
- 3 November —
  - US President Donald Trump announces that the US will terminate all military aid to Israel, totaling $4 billion per year, by the end of 2026, but will continue to sell military hardware.
  - A 3,300-year-old Egyptian amulet dating to the Late Bronze Age is discovered by a 17-year-old American boy from Tel Gezer National Park in the Judaean Foothills.
- 4 November — Clalit Health Services and Schneider Children's Medical Center announce the launch of Schneider Children's Venture Capital, Israel's first venture capital investment fund dedicated to pediatric healthcare innovation and the third fund of its kind globally.
- 5 November
  - The Joint List announces that it will support Gadi Eisenkot as Prime Minister, providing him the majority of recommendations, adding that it will support the minority government externally and that it will not topple it in the event of a security emergency.
  - Israel and Germany extend their energy partnership into 2027.
- 8 November –
  - President Herzog formally gives Gadi Eisenkot the mandate of establishing a new government.
  - Ra'am declares that even in the absence of a formal coalition agreement, it would vote to back a government headed by Eisenkot.
- 10 November – The IDF announces that an Israeli civilian entered Lebanon illegally near the Rosh HaNikra Crossing, adding that UN peacekeepers discovered him close to the border and handed him over to its soldiers for return to Israel.
- 15 November – The Jerusalem District Court issues a default judgment ordering former International Criminal Court chief prosecutor Karim Ahmad Khan to pay NIS 25 million in damages and NIS 2.5 million in legal costs to former hostage Eitan Mor and the families of Avinatan Or and Omri Miran, after Khan fails to submit a defense in a August 2025 civil suit filed by Shurat HaDin alleging that his delays in seeking arrest warrants for Hamas leaders prolonged the hostages' captivity.
- 16 November –
  - The University of Haifa establishes the country's first suicide prevention center, backed by a $8.8 million (NIS 28 million) five-year grant from the Overlake Fund led by William L. Gottesman, son of American businessman David Gottesman, and his wife, Debra L. Gottesman.
  - For the first time since 2009, a Venezuelan delegation arrives in Israel.
- 17 November
  - The UK sanctions eight Israeli firms linked to West Bank settlement building and an activist group that obstructs aid to Gaza.
  - Israel announces that it foiled an overnight attempt to smuggle Kalashnikov rifles near Nitzana along the Egyptian border.
- 18 November –
  - Australia announces new sanctions against Israeli activists and entities for "illegal settlement growth" in the West Bank.
  - To target what it described as a tunnel posing a threat to troops, the IDF initiates a ground operation west of the Yellow Line in the central Gaza Strip, advancing tanks onto Salah al-Din Road close to the Nuseirat and Bureij refugee camps, a raid denounced by Hamas as a blatant breach of the October 2025 ceasefire.
- 19 November —
  - The IDF returns nine detainees back to Gaza after determining they were not involved in militancy.
  - The IDF announces that it completed a tank raid targeting "Hamas infrastructure" in central Gaza.
- 21 November
  - A woman in her thirties dies of rabies at Shamir Medical Center in Tzrifin after being bitten by a stray dog near Kfar Rut, marking the country's first fatality from the disease since 2024.
  - The Jaroushi and Shamali crime families of Ramla conclude a multi-year feud, which had resulted in approximately 40 deaths, through a sulha reconciliation ceremony in Lod.

== Holidays ==
- 2 April – Passover
- 8 April – Seventh day of Passover
- 22 April – Independence Day
- 22 May – Feast of Shavuot
- 12–13 September – Rosh Hashanah
- 21 September – Yom Kippur
- 26 September – Sukkot
- 3 October – Simchat Torah

== Deaths ==
- 1 January –
  - Yehezkel Dror, 97, Austrian-born political scientist.
  - Morris Kahn, 95, South African-born telecommunications industry executive, founder of Golden Pages, Amdocs and the Aurec Group.
  - Amit Saar, 47, intelligence officer, head of the Military Intelligence Research Department (2020–2024).
- 7 January – Uri Lupolianski, 74, politician, mayor of Jerusalem (2003–2008) and founder of Yad Sarah.
- 11 January – Gabriel Barkay, 81, archaeologist.
- 12 January – Isaac Witz, 91, Austrian-born immunologist.
- 19 January – Eitan Na'eh, 62, diplomat, ambassador to Turkey (2016–2018) and Bahrain (2021–2023).
- 4 February –
  - Margalit Oved, 96, American-born dancer and choreographer.
  - Zohar Shavit, 74, scholar, author and translator.
  - Igal Talmi, 101, Ukrainian-born nuclear physicist.
- 7 February – Matti Caspi, 76, singer-songwriter.
- 8 February –
  - David Federman, 81, stockbroker and basketball club owner (Maccabi Tel Aviv).
  - Eli Alaluf, 80, Moroccan-born politician, MK (2015–2019).
  - Victor Sarusi, 81, footballer (Maccabi Netanya, Beitar Jerusalem, national team).
- 12 February – Dani Arditi, 75, military officer.
- 13 February – Joseph Halpern, 72, Israeli-born American computer scientist.
- 15 February – Dana Eden, 52, television producer.
- 24 February – Ora Kedem, 101, Austrian-born chemist.
- 3 March – Eli Shamir, 91–92, mathematician and computer scientist.
- 8 March – David Rokni, 94, colonel.
- 10 March – Abdulwahab Darawshe, 82, Israeli-Arab MK (1984–1999)
- 18 March – Yaakov Edri, 75, Moroccan-born politician, MK (2003–2013), minister of health (2006) and development of Negev and the Galilee (2007–2009).
- 20 March – Yair Levy, 73, Haredi rabbi and politician, MK (1988–1992).
- 24 March – Edna Foa, 88, psychologist.
- 1 April – Suki Lahav, 74, violinist (E Street Band), singer and lyricist.
- 2 April – Aron Shai, 83, historian.
- 9 April – Ari Ben-Menahem, 97, German-born mathematician and geophysicist.
- 14 April – Shlomo Breznitz, 89, Czechoslovak-born author and politician, MK (2006–2007). (death announced on this date)
- 14 April – Michael O. Rabin, 94, mathematician and computer scientist (Miller–Rabin primality test).
- 18 April – David Mena, 73, politician, lawyer, member of the Knesset (1992–1996; 2006).
- 20 April – Gideon Tish, 86, footballer (Hapoel Tel Aviv, Hapoel Herzliya, national team).
- 28 April – Ittai Gradel, 61, antiques dealer, renal cancer.
- 29 April – Yair Garbuz, 80, visual artist, writer, and opinion journalist.
- 4 May – Herman Branover, 94, Russian born physicist (SATEC).
- 6 May – Aryeh Stern, 81, rabbi.
- 11 May – Dovid Shmidel, 92, rabbi, chairman of Asra Kadisha (since 1977).
- 20 May – Raz Adam, 26, basketball player (Hapoel Tel Aviv).
- 28 May – Yitzhak Apeloig, 81, Uzbek-born computational chemist and scholar, president of Technion (2001–2009).
- 21 June –
  - Yaacov Agam, 98, sculptor and experimental artist.
  - Ilana Cohen, 82, politician, MK (2003–2006).
- 1 July – Edna Arbel, 82, judge, justice of the supreme court (2004–2014).
- 6 July – Nitzan Gilady, 56, film director (In Satmar Custody, Jerusalem Is Proud to Present, Wedding Doll).
- 9 July – Assaf Razin, 85, economist, academic and author.
- 18 July – Joseph Algazy, 87, historian and journalist (Haaretz, Le Monde diplomatique).
- 19 July – Israel Pincas, 91, Bulgarian-born poet.
- 22 July – Haim Yavin, 93, television anchor (Channel 1) and documentary filmmaker.
- 5 August – Shimon Charnuha, 78, footballer (Maccabi Netanya, Beitar Jerusalem, national team).
- 6 August –
  - Shimon Shelah, 94, basketball player and coach (Hapoel Tel Aviv, national team).
  - Daniel Sivan, 76, Moroccan-born linguist.
- 11 August – Yehuda Lapidot, 97, historian and biochemist.
- 13 August – Oren Nahari, 70, journalist and presenter (Channel 1).
- 14 August – Arnon Soffer, 90, geographer.
- 18 August – Shaul Mishal, 81, political scientist.
- 19 August –
  - Shmuel Harlap, 81, businessman and startup investor.
  - Tsuri Sagi, 92, military officer.
- 23 August – Orit Galili-Zucker, 70, journalist and political consultant, cancer.
- 31 August – Ada Yonath, 87, crystallographer, Nobel Prize laureate (2009).
- 6 September – Israël Isaac Besançon, 81, French-Israeli rabbi and painter.
- 11 September – Rachel Rabin, 101, educator and activist.
- 13 September – Yehuda Aharon Vidovsky, 107, Polish-born businessman and Holocaust survivor.
- 16 September – Esterina Tartman, 68, politician, MK (2006–2009).
- 22 September – Lucien Lazare, 101, French-Israeli history teacher and resistance fighter.
- 24 September –
  - Yehuda Atlas, 89, writer, poet and translator.
  - Jacob Goldwasser, 76, filmmaker (Beyond the Sea, Laces).
- 1 October – Gilad Ben Shach, 85, radio program editor (Kol Israel).
- 4 October – Yosef Hagoel, 80, military officer.
- 26 October – Sheffi Paz, 74, Polish-born anti-immigration activist, cancer.
- 31 October – Sara Bender, 78, historian.
- 7 November – Mike Carter, 71, American-Israeli basketball player (Hapoel Holon, Hapoel Jerusalem, Maccabi Ramat Gan), organ failure.
- 8 November – Bar Belfer, 37, actress (Someone to Run With), musician, and radio announcer, epileptic seizure.
- 13 November – Dvora Hacohen, 89, historian. (death announced on this date)
