= Nahari =

Nahari can refer to:

== Places ==
- Mq'invari Nahari, glacier in the country of Georgia
- Nahārī Das̲h̲tah, plain in Afghanistan
- Nahari, Kōchi, town in Japan
  - Nahari Station, railway station in Nahari, Kōchi
- Nahari, Madhubani, village in India

== People ==
- Abdulaziz al-Nahari, Saudi journalist
- Adam D Nahari, researcher
- Maimon Nahari, an Israeli judge
- Meshulam Nahari (born 1951), Israeli politician
- Moshe Ya'ish al-Nahari (1978–2008), Yemeni Jewish Hebrew teacher, kosher butcher, and murder victim
- Nahari, also called Naharai the Beerothite, one of David's Mighty Warriors in the Bible
- Oren Nahari (1956–2026), Israeli television presenter
- Shlomo Nahari, Israeli association football player
- Yehuda Nahari (born 1985), Israeli actor

== Other ==
- Nahari, the Swahili word for the constellation Eridanus
- Nahari language, Indo-Aryan language spoken in the states of Chhattisgarh and Odisha in India

== See also ==
- Nagari (disambiguation)
- Nahar (disambiguation)
- Nehari (disambiguation)
- Nihari, stew from the Indian subcontinent consisting of slow-cooked meat flavored with long pepper
