= AIREV =

- Type: Private
- Industry: Electric aircraft
- Founded: 2018
- Founder: Rani Plaut, Chen Rosen, and Netanel Goldberg
- Headquarters: Auburndale, Florida, United States
- Website: https://www.airev.aero/

AIREV (Hebrew: אייר אי.וי בע"מ), also known as AIR, is an Israeli privately held company that develops and manufactures electric aircraft.

AIR VEV develops electric vertical takeoff and landing (eVTOL) aircraft for personal use. Its flagship aircraft, AIR ONE, is a two-seat electric vehicle capable of traveling up to 110 miles at speeds of up to 155 mph. Designed for practical everyday use, it features foldable wings for easier storage and can take off and land on flat surfaces.

The company incorporates patented aerodynamic designs and advanced flight control systems to support stable and maneuverable flight. AIREV is operating in the United States and Australia.

== History ==

The company was founded in 2017 by Rani Plaut (CEO), Chen Rosen (CTO), and Netanel Goldberg to develop and manufacture eVTOL (electric vertical takeoff and landing) aircraft. Its investors since its establishment include Entree Capital Dr. Shmuel Harlap and Gil Agmon.

In October 2021, the company unveiled the prototype of the AIR ONE.

In June 2022, the company completed its first successful full-scale hover flight in Israel. By late 2023, the company shifted part of its operations to the United States, establishing a flight test center near West Palm Beach, Florida.

=== 2025 ===
In late 2025, the company delivered its first unmanned cargo aircraft, the Athe AIR 120D, which can carry a payload of 550 lbs. The self piloted, two-seat AIR ONE, was granted Federal Aviation Administration (FAA) airworthiness that same year.

In July 2025, the company raised US$23 million in a funding round led by Israeli venture capital firm Entrée Capital.

=== 2026 ===
In February 2026, the company and Singapore-based ST Engineering announced the launch of a new unmanned electric vertical take-off and landing (eVTOL) aircraft called the DrN-600.

By 2026, AIR had progressed from aircraft prototyping to aircraft manufacturing, with delivered aircraft, ongoing operational activity, and investment from institutional investors. These developments reflect the company’s progress toward establishing itself as an original equipment manufacturer (OEM) in the aerospace industry.

In March 2026, the company reported sales of more than 25 unmanned AIR 120D aircraft and pre-orders for the AIR ONE aircraft exceeding 3,300 customers.

Also in 2026 it was published that AIR's latest aircraft, designed for heavy-duty cargo operations, completed its first full flight in a production-ready configuration.
