= Nehari =

- Zeev Nehari, mathematician
- Nehari manifold in mathematics
- Nihari, South Asian stew
