= In Satmar Custody =

- Directed by: Nitzan Gilady
- Release date: 2003
- Country: Israel
- Languages: Hebrew, English

In Satmar Custody is a 2003 documentary of the Jaradis, a Yemenite Jewish family, one of many brought from Yemen to the USA by the Hasidic Satmar community that advocates against immigration to Israel. The story exposes the deep cultural gap between the Yemenite families and the Yiddish-speaking Satmar community. The film starts on the day that Yahia and Lauza Jaradi, brought from Yemen to the Satmar community in Monroe, New York, received a phone call notifying them that their two-and-a-half-year-old daughter, Hadia, died in a hospital in Paterson, New Jersey. Through their search for their daughter's body, we learn the course of events that led to the death of Hadia.

Hadia was hospitalized after she fell from her chair and lost consciousness. The Satmar community contended that Lauza abused Hadia and appealed to court to obtain custody of her other four children. When Hadia died, Lauza was in danger of being charged with causing Hadia's death and was advised to leave the USA.

At the end of the film, the examining physician explains that the death of Hadia resulted from an improperly placed tube in the hospital.

Meanwhile, the other four Jaradi children were educated in Yiddish and Satmar observance. Yahia and Lauza were unable to regain custody of them. Yahia and Lauza emigrated to Israel where Lauza gave birth to a baby boy.

In Satmar Custody won the Audience Award at the Marseille International Documentary Film Festival in 2003 where the film was described as: "Jewish family from the Yemen joins a Hassidic community near New York. When it decides to distance itself, the father loses his job. One day, the youngest girl falls from her chair and is taken in a coma to hospital, where she dies a few months later. In what circumstances? Where is her body? The father starts a search in which Hassidic Jews play a strange role, sometimes helpful, sometimes obstructive. This film could be described as an American-style thriller, terse and blunt. The remarkable things are the atmosphere of conspiracy and the luck of the film-maker who was able to record everything live, on the spot, and especially the father himself, with his extraordinary mask of impassive despair."
