= Yosef Hagoel =

Israeli military officer (1946–2026)

- יוסף חגואל
- Hagoel in 2025
- Born: 8 September 1946; Tel Aviv, Mandatory Palestine
- Died: 4 October 2026 (aged 80)
- Children: 1
- Military career
- Branch: Israel Defense Forces
- Service years: 1960s–2026
- Rank: Major general
- Conflicts: Six-Day War; Yom Kippur War; 1982 Lebanon War

Yosef Hagoel (8 September 1946 – 4 October 2026) was an Israeli military officer.

== Early life and military career ==
Hagoel was born in Tel Aviv, and was raised in Ramat Gan. He enlisted in the Israel Defense Forces, and in 1967, he fought in the Six-Day War with the 28th Battalion of the 55th Paratroopers Brigade. During the war, his legs were severely wounded and he was dragged by Shlomo Epstein, a medic who was killed from an explosion while sacrificing himself to save Hagoel's life. After the explosion, Hagoel was evacuated and underwent surgeries. The song "A Ballad for a Medic", a chorus written by Dan Almagor, was based on the events of Epstein sacrificing himself for Hagoel.

During his military service, Hagoel fought at the Yom Kippur War and the 1982 Lebanon War. In 2023, he was promoted to the rank of major general, and according to Mako, he "accumulated more than 3,000 days of reserve duty".

== Personal life and death ==
Hagoel was married, and his marriage lasted until his death in 2026. One of his sons is named after Epstein, the medic who sacrificed himself to save Hagoel's life.

Hagoel died at his home on 4 October 2026, at the age of 80.
