= Hagmar =

Hagmar are local civil defense and reserve units of the Israel Defense Forces composed of residents who protect their own communities. Following the October 7 attacks, these units expanded considerably across the West Bank. These troops work alongside normal standing battalions under Central Command, but critics and active-duty sources mention instances of independent field operations.
