= 2026 West Bank lockdown =

- Part of the Middle Eastern crisis (2023–present)
- Location: Primarily Hebron Governorate, West Bank, Palestine
- Date: 23 October 2026 – 2 November 2026
- Executed by: Israel Defense Forces
- Casualties: 9+ Palestinians injured
- Losses: 3,300–5,000 Palestinians displaced 110+ Palestinians arrested

On 23 October 2026, the Israel Defense Forces (IDF) launched a 10-day military operation in Hebron Governorate in response to a shooting by two Palestinian gunmen which killed two Israeli soldiers and injured three others at a checkpoint in Hebron. The operation followed the announcement of a "full lockdown" of the West Bank by Israeli prime minister Benjamin Netanyahu. The IDF operation saw the closure of the Hebron, widespread destruction of infrastructure, and the forced displacement of between 3,300 and 5,000 Palestinians. Dozens of people were arrested in raids targeting Hebron and other cities in the West Bank. The IDF concluded its operation in Hebron on 2 November.

== Background ==
At around 07:30 (UTC+2) on 23 October, two Palestinian gunmen from Hebron, Firas and Hamouda al-Jaaba, drove to the Yehuda Junction IDF checkpoint, where around four soldiers from the Home Front Command's 775th "Ari" Search and Rescue Battalion were conducting routine searches on vehicles leaving the city. The gunmen, armed with an M16 rifle and a pistol, left their car on the side of the street and opened fire on the checkpoint, under the cover of nearby buildings. The resulting shootout lasted over 20 minutes before the gunmen retreated. Two soldiers were killed in the attack, while three others were injured. The shooters were then flanked by officers from the Ari Battalion and the 101st Battalion of the 35th Paratroopers Brigade who shot them dead. The IDF estimates that the gunmen planned a larger attack on Highway 35, but abandoned their plans upon encountering the checkpoint.

== Lockdown ==
After the shooting, Israeli prime minister Benjamin Netanyahu convened with his security chiefs, including IDF chief Eyal Zamir, defense minister Israel Katz, Shin Bet chief David Zini, Samuel Benezra, and Avi Bluth. Netanyahu then ordered a full lockdown of the West Bank, and announced that the IDF was preparing to conduct its largest military operation in the territory since the Six-Day War in 1967. Netanyahu also ordered the destruction and forced evacuation of the neighborhood from which the shooters hailed.

The IDF raided the homes of the shooters in Hebron, and announced the full closure of Hebron and nearby communities. In dozens of operations in the West Bank, Israeli security forces then arrested dozens of Palestinians, including some linked to Hamas and the Palestinian Islamic Jihad, and seized weapons including M16 rifles and submachine guns. By the afternoon, the IDF had begun demolishing buildings in Hebron. Palestinians were forced to evacuate Farsh al-Hawa, where buildings were bulldozed.

Later that day, the IDF announced the launch of a major counterterrorism operation aiming to dismantle militant infrastructure and interrogate suspects, adding that it was expected to take several days and was limited to the Hebron area. By 24 October, over 2,200 Palestinians had been displaced; IDF raids targeted 15 cities, including Jenin, Nablus, Ramallah, Al-Bireh, Birzeit, Bethlehem, and East Jerusalem, resulting in 70 arrests. The Hebron operation primarily targeted the neighborhoods of Ein Deir Baha and Farsh al-Hawa, and destroyed infrastructure such as homes, businesses, and industrial sites. The Hebron municipal government said that around 35 hectares (86 acres) had been demolished or marked for demolition. A home in the area was reportedly turned into a temporary military base. The IDF confirmed destroying "illegally built" infrastructure that would hamper its operations. Nine Palestinians, including six children, were treated for suffocation after inhaling tear gas launched by Israeli soldiers in Halhul. By 26 October, Israel had constructed 120 checkpoints and 128 gates across Hebron, while the number of people displaced rose to 3,971. The Palestinian Prisoners Club also announced that 80 people had been arrested.

On 28 October, the Palestinian Prisoners Club reported that 110 people had been arrested in Hebron since the beginning of the operation. The IDF also cut off villages near Masafer Yatta, while settlers destroyed 200 trees, agricultural facilities, and wells east of Hebron. The IDF said that it seized an M16 assault rifle and detained six wanted suspects in the Hebron area. The following day, a spokesperson for Hebron said that 4,969 people had been displaced during the operation. At least 13 Palestinians were arrested in raids across the West Bank, while demolitions occurred in Salfit and Deir Ballut. The IDF also demolished the homes of the two gunmen responsible for the Yehuda Junction shooting.

On 2 November, the IDF announced the conclusion of its operation in Hebron, stating that it confiscated four weapons and 25 vehicles in the span of 10 days. The Hebron government estimated that it lost NIS 10–12 million per day, while 13 industrial plants were damaged.

== Reactions ==
UN Secretary-General António Guterres expressed concern about the lockdown's impact on Palestinian freedom of movement. A statement from the Office of the High Commissioner for Human Rights described the Israeli operation as "part of a pattern of collective punishment" against Palestinians. Israeli NGO B'Tselem accused Israel of committing ethnic cleansing in Hebron. Far-right minister Bezalel Smotrich posted a video of himself in front of a bulldozer tearing down a home while defense minister Israel Katz promised mass demolitions of Palestinian property and forced displacement.

On 26 October, the Israeli Public Broadcasting Corporation reported that Netanyahu rejected IDF Chief of Staff Lt. Gen. Eyal Zamir's request to lift the lockdown ahead of the Knesset election two days earlier, despite Zamir's explanation that the objectives had already been met.
