= Orit Galili-Zucker =

Israeli journalist and political consultant (1956–2026)

Orit Galili-Tzucker (Hebrew: אורית גלילי-צוקר; 29 March 1956 – 23 August 2026) was an Israeli journalist and political consultant. She was the head of the political communications team for Prime Minister Benjamin Netanyahu.

== Life and career ==
Galili-Zucker was born in Jerusalem on 29 March 1956. She held a bachelor's degree in Political Science and Sociology from Tel Aviv University. Galili-Zucker received her doctorate from Bar-Ilan University for her dissertation: "The New Politician in the Western and Israeli Arenas: Clinton, Blair and Schröder vs. Netanyahu, Barak and Ramon." She served as a political consultant for Ehud Barak.

She began her professional career as a parliamentary assistant for MP Ora Namir and as a lecture coordinator on the Executive Committee of the Histadrut. In the early eighties, she joined the Schocken Group publishing network - first, as an desk editor for Ha'ir newspaper and later, in 1983, as a news desk editor at Haaretz, where she served as a writer and senior editor until 1999. During this period, she also worked for a short time at Channel 1 of the Israel Broadcasting Authority as a reporter on the Yoman television program. In 1999, she left her position at Haaretz for Academia.

From 1999, Galili-Zucker lectured at most of the major universities in Israel, including Bar-Ilan University, Tel Aviv University, Haifa University, Hebrew University of Jerusalem and the Open University. She also served as Chair of the Political Science Committee in the Ministry of Education and for two years (2004-2006) held the position of Academic Director for the Executive MA program in Political Leadership from the School of Government and the Department of Political Science at Tel Aviv University. In addition, she led a colloquium on National Leadership at the IDF's National Security College.

In the 2009 elections, Galili-Zucker served as strategic advisor for the Labor Party and its head, Ehud Barak. Between March 2011 and May 2013, she headed Likud Chairman Benjamin Netanyahu's political communications team.

Following her work with Netanyahu she opened a strategic political communications consulting firm which is currently advising Israeli politicians and providing researches.

Galili-Zucker's main areas of interest included new theories on political leadership, the 21st century and the multi-disciplinary nature of leadership, political communications and its impact on the electoral process, and the link between changes in social values and new leadership models (e.g. the Trump phenomena).

She occasionally wrote articles for leading Israeli newspapers and regularly appeared on Israeli televised political debates.

Galili-Zucker died from cancer at the Tel Aviv Sourasky Medical Center, on 23 August 2026, at the age of 70. She had been diagnosed two years earlier.

== Books ==
- Contemporary Communication Politics: Online Citizenship in the Era of New Media. Ramot Publishing House, Ramat Aviv: Tel Aviv University, 2008
- The Tele-Politicians: New Political Leadership in the West and in Israel. Ramot Publishing House, Ramat Aviv: Tel Aviv University, 2004
