= Democratic Republic of the Congo–Israel relations =

Bilateral relations

- DR Congo: Israel

Diplomatic mission
- Embassy of the Democratic Republic of the Congo, Tel Aviv: Embassy of Israel, Kinshasa

Formal diplomatic relations between Israel and the Democratic Republic of Congo have existed since 1962. Both countries are members of the United Nations. In 1973, like the majority of African countries that previously recognized Israel, Zaire (former name of the DRC) decided to break its relations with Israel after the Yom Kippur War, but reestablished them, unlike other African countries, in the early 1980s.

In March 2020, Congolese President Félix Tshisekedi announced his intention to appoint an ambassador to Israel (where the DRC had, until then, been represented by a chargé d'affaires) and the creation of an economic section in Jerusalem.

== History ==
=== Early relations ===
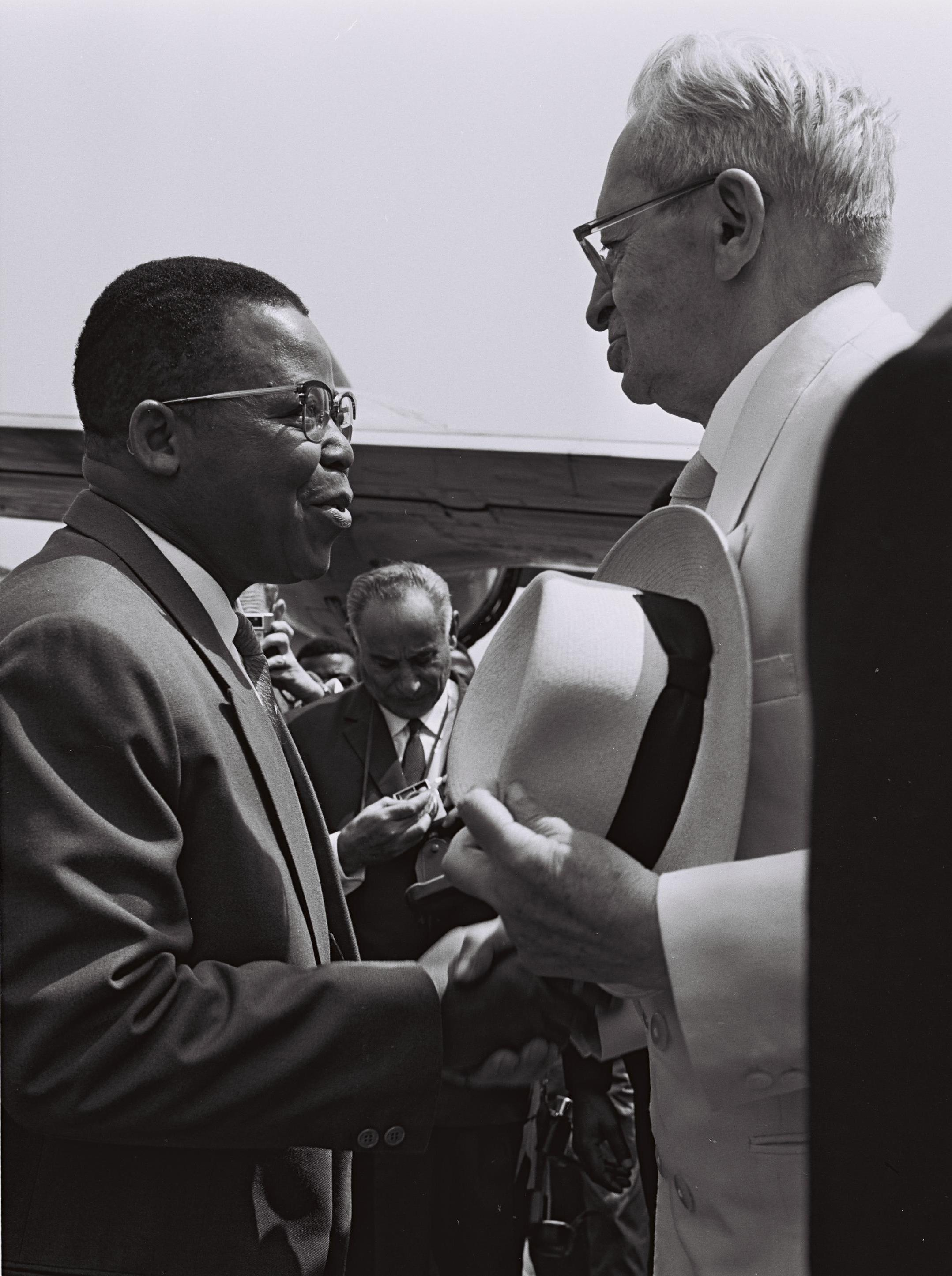
Meeting between heads of state Joseph Kasa-Vubu and Yitzhak Ben-Zvi in Léopoldville (Kinshasa) in 1962.

The first meeting between the heads of the two states took place in August 1962, when Israeli President Yitzhak Ben-Zvi went to Léopoldville (now Kinshasa) and met his Congolese counterpart, Joseph Kasa-Vubu.

=== During the Mobutu presidency (1965–1997) ===
In October 1973 following the Yom Kippur War, Mobutu decided to break diplomatic ties with Israel, declaring that "Zaire must choose between a friendly country, Israel, and a brother country, Egypt. Now, between a friend and a brother, the choice is clear". Zaire would later become the first African country to re-establish relations with Tel Aviv in 1982, followed by Libéria in 1983, Côte d'Ivoire and Cameroon in 1986, and Togo in 1987.

During this resumption of relations, Mobutu and Ariel Sharon, Israeli Minister of Defense in Menahem Begin's cabinet, signed a military agreement to train and equip his presidential guard. Sharon also met, through Mobutu, Chadian President Hissène Habré, with whom Israel signed arms delivery contracts in 1983, in the context of the Chadian–Libyan War.

Israel's aid to Zaire continued in 1994 with the signing of a $50 million contract to send around forty Israeli military advisers to Kinshasa.

=== Modern relations ===
In 2012, the State of Israel opened an Honorary Consulate in Kinshasa. Aslan Piha was appointed Honorary Consul there until his death on 21 September 2023. To this day, the Honorary Consulate still handles day-to-day affairs without a head of post.

In June 2019, Joseph Kabila, Congolese president from 2001 to 2018, was accused of having recruited former Mossad agents to spy on his opponents.

In March 2020, Félix Tshisekedi, Congolese president since January 2019, travelled to the United States and participated in an annual conference organized by the American Israel Public Affairs Committee (AIPAC). He announced a resumption of diplomatic relations at the highest level between his country and Israel, and the upcoming appointment of a Congolese ambassador to Israel, where the Congo had previously been represented for twenty years by a chargé d'affaires.

Tshisekedi also announced the opening of a new commercial section of the DRC Embassy in West Jerusalem (while the embassy itself would remain in Tel Aviv), as well as his support for the Israeli-Palestinian peace plan proposed by US President Donald Trump. This announcement provoked controversy in the DRC, as the plan was considered highly unfavourable to the Palestinians by the international community, and was rejected by the African Union, which Tshisekedi became the president of in 2021.

In response to the 2023 Hamas-led attack on Israel, Tshisekedi condemned the attacks of Palestinian resistance organizations against Israel.

== Areas of cooperation ==
=== Humanitarian cooperation ===
The Israeli NGO Africa 2030 is established in the Democratic Republic of the Congo, with the stated goals of ecological preservation and combating malnutrition.

=== Dan Gertler affair ===
Israeli businessman Dan Gertler, based in the DRC since 1997, is one of the main exporters of Congolese minerals, including diamonds, copper and cobalt. His position is explained by a monopoly allegedly granted to him by DRC President Laurent-Désiré Kabila, as part of an agreement including financial compensation and arms deliveries from Israel. Since then, several NGOs and foreign governments have accused Gertler of plundering the DRC's resources, corruption, and complicity in the crimes committed by presidents Laurent Désiré et Joseph Kabila (son of the previous president) during the First and Second Congo Wars.

In 2013, the Africa Progress Panel indicated that the businessman deprived the DRC of $1.4 billion in revenue from mining licenses.

In 2017, Dan Gertler was sanctioned by the US treasury alongside fourteen other people, accusing them of repeated violations of human rights.

== See also ==
- Foreign relations of the Democratic Republic of the Congo
- Foreign relations of Israel
