= Gilad Ben Shach =

Israeli radio program editor (1941–2026)

- גלעד בן ש"ך
- Born: 21 April 1941; Gedera, Mandatory Palestine
- Died: 1 October 2026 (aged 85); Israel
- Occupations: Composer, radio broadcaster
- Years active: 1960–2010
- Employer: Kol Israel

Gilad Ben Shach (Hebrew: גלעד בן ש"ך; 21 April 1941 – 1 October 2026) was an Israeli composer and radio program editor. During his decade-long career at Kol Israel, he composed and translated for artists such as Ilan & Ilanit and Dana International.

== Life and career ==
Gilad Ben Shach was born in Gedera, Mandatory Palestine on 21 April 1941. He was the eldest son of Yehuda Shechvitz, writer and journalist, and his wife, Batya Shechevitz (née Czarniak). His grandfather, Mordechai Shechvitz, was one of the founders of Gedera and served as the Mukhtar of the town. His ancestor, Shabbatai HaKohen, was a talmudist and halakhist, from whom the family formed its surname Ben-Shach.

In 1960, Ben Shach started his career when he composed and translated songs for many Israeli singers. When he was at university, he met and collaborated with Ilan & Ilanit. He also composed a Hebrew translation of Poupée de cire, poupée de son, a song by France Gall, which she sang, winning in the Eurovision Song Contest 1965. In 1969, he joined Kol Israel, where he became the music editor for the news program BaHatzi HaYom. In 1976, Ben Shach was the first head of the station's entertainment department. From 1987 to 1993, he edited the radio show Al Betah and composed the opening theme song. In 1976, he served as the editor for the Ein Gev Music Festival and was a member of the judges' panel for the 1998 Israel Prize in Hebrew Song.

Ben Shach died on 1 October 2026, at the age of 85.
