= Uri Misgav =

Israeli journalist, publicist, lecturer, teacher and director

- אורי משגב
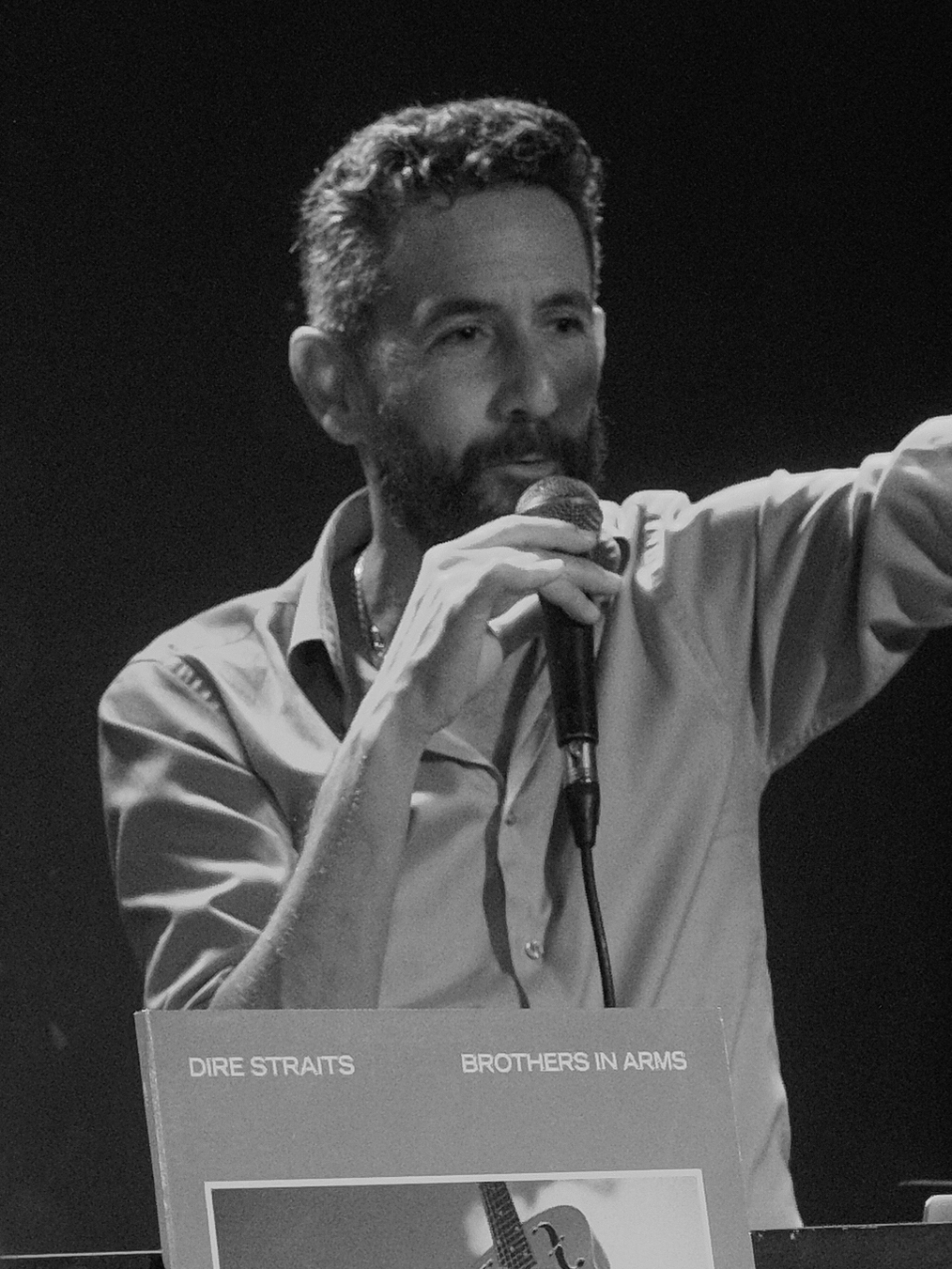
- Uri Misgav, 2023
- Born: April 15, 1974 (age 52); Kibbutz Haftziba
- Occupations: journalist; publicist; lecturer; teacher; director
- Years active: 1999–present
- Known for: journalism

Uri Misgav (Hebrew: אורי משגב; born April 15, 1974) is an Israeli journalist, publicist, lecturer, teacher and director. Currently a journalist in Israel, one of the leaders of the Black Flag protest and among the prominent opponents of Prime Minister Benjamin Netanyahu.

== Biography ==
Misgav was born in Kibbutz Haftziba to Chaim, an administrator and treasurer, and to Hanna, a technical secretary. Studied at Harod Valley ORT High School. He served in the IDF as an intelligence officer in the Artillery Corps. He holds a bachelor's degree in political science and history from Tel Aviv University.

== Career ==
=== Journalism ===
In 1999, Misgav began his journalism career when he joined the "Ha'ir" newspaper. There, Misgav served as a magazine reporter, a political commentator, a music critic and a columnist in the sports section. Later he was appointed to the position of editor of the sports section and deputy editor of the newspaper. In 2001, he served as the paper's reporter in New York City and covered the September 11 attacks.

In 2004, he joined the news company of Channel 10, and served as a magazine and culture reporter for the evening news edition. In 2005, he joined the weekly magazine "Time Out", and served as deputy editor of the magazine.

In 2006, he joined "Haaretz", and held the position of editor and writer. In 2007, he moved to "Yediot Ahronoth" as a member of the editorial board, adding to the Sabbath edition and writing opinion articles. At the end of four years of work, his work was terminated by the editor-in-chief. In 2012, Misgav returned to Haaretz. He publishes opinion articles, commentary columns in the newspaper as well as the political blog "Misgav Laam" (Misgav to the People).

=== As director ===
In 2014, he directed the documentary "Life of Poetry: The Story of Avraham Halfi". The film was produced for Channel 8 by Castina Communications, and premiered at the Jerusalem Film Festival.

=== As teacher and lecturer ===
Misgav taught between 2006 and 2015 at the "Kahila" democratic school, and previously served as a lecturer in the communication department of Sapir College, and he often lectures in various forums on topics in the field of journalism and music. In 2010, Misgav together with the Third Ear founded the "Beatles Academy", within the framework of which he lectures throughout the country about the story of the band and its members.

=== On television ===
At the end of 2022, he joined the team of presenters of the program "Critics of the State" on the Knesset Channel alongside Gadi Taub, Neve Drumi and others.

== Protest activity ==
In 2020, together with Shikma Bressler, he was one of the initiators of the Black Flags protest, which he called to join in a post he published on his Facebook page.

== His public views ==
In his Haaretz column, Misgav expresses leftist and anti-religious positions. Misgav previously provoked widespread public criticism when he wrote a column in which he explained why he did not circumcise his son, as well as in columns in which he called for an end to the study and commemoration of the Holocaust in Israel on the grounds that they are "Zionist indoctrination." A column he wrote in which he called Supreme Court Judge Noam Solberg an "international criminal" because he lives in the Israeli-occupied West Bank, received sharp condemnation from former Justice Minister Ayelet Shaked.

In October 2023, following the Gaza war, he accused the Netanyahu government of being responsible for the attack. According to him, the security in the residential areas near the Gaza border was neglected, and the government ministers were busy with leisure, and not with security matters.

Misgav is one of the biggest opponents of Prime Minister Benjamin Netanyahu, and regularly writes many criticisms of him.

On March 11, 2023, the police detained Uri Misgav following a tweet in which he advised Netanyahu not to come to Berlin.

== Journalistic exposés ==
On July 27, 2017, he petitioned the Supreme Court against the Attorney General and the State Attorney, demanding that they make a decision on the Prime Minister's residency case, after 14 months had passed since the police recommended filing charges. The petition was deleted two months later after the advisor announced his intention to file charges in the case.

During the Corona outbreak in 2021, he published an investigation into the "rescue flights" arrangement approved by the government subject to the approval of the Exceptions Committee, in which he claimed that many ultra-Orthodox arrived in Israel on rescue flights, when Israelis stranded abroad who are not ultra-Orthodox did not receive permits for this, thus discriminating against non-Orthodox The piece made waves and further investigations by other journalists exposed it as well.

In 2023, he revealed a gifting affair that Benjamin Netanyahu did not return to the State of Israel after leaving the Prime Minister's office in 2021. Among them is a Bible worth millions that he received from Vladimir Putin.

== Criticism ==
In January 2021, he wrote an article in Haaretz newspaper against the ultra-Orthodox public regarding the Corona epidemic in which he wrote that "the ultra-Orthodox are destroying and defeating the state". As a result, complaints were filed against him and the Ethics Tribunal of the Press Council determined that the article was racist, inciting and encouraging civil war. The court also reprimanded Haaretz and ordered the removal of the article from the newspaper's website.

In September 2023, Minister Amichai Chikli filed a libel suit against him because it claimed that Chikli refused to enlist during the Second Lebanon War.

On October 5, 2023, after he revealed that Minister Nir Barkat traveled to London at the public expense, journalist Ayala Hasson called him a "liar" on Twitter.
