= Aron Shai =

Israeli academic (1942–2026)

- אהרן שי
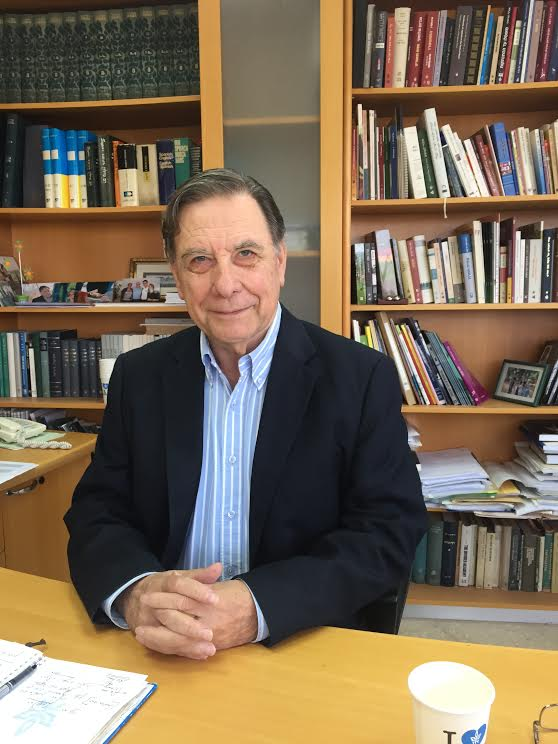
- Shai in 2015
- Born: November 25, 1942; Jerusalem, Mandatory Palestine
- Died: April 2, 2026 (aged 83)
- Education: Hebrew University of Jerusalem; University of Oxford
- Occupation: Academic rector

Aron Shai (Hebrew: אהרן שי; November 25, 1942 – April 2, 2026) was an Israeli academic administrator and sinologist. He was the rector of Tel Aviv University from 2010 to 2015, and the co-founder of its Department of East Asian Studies, where he was the Shaul N. Eisenberg Professor. He wrote eleven books, including historical novels, and produced academic literature about China. Shai died on April 2, 2026, at the age of 83.
