= Ora Kedem =

Austrian-Israeli chemist (1924–2026)

- אורה קדם
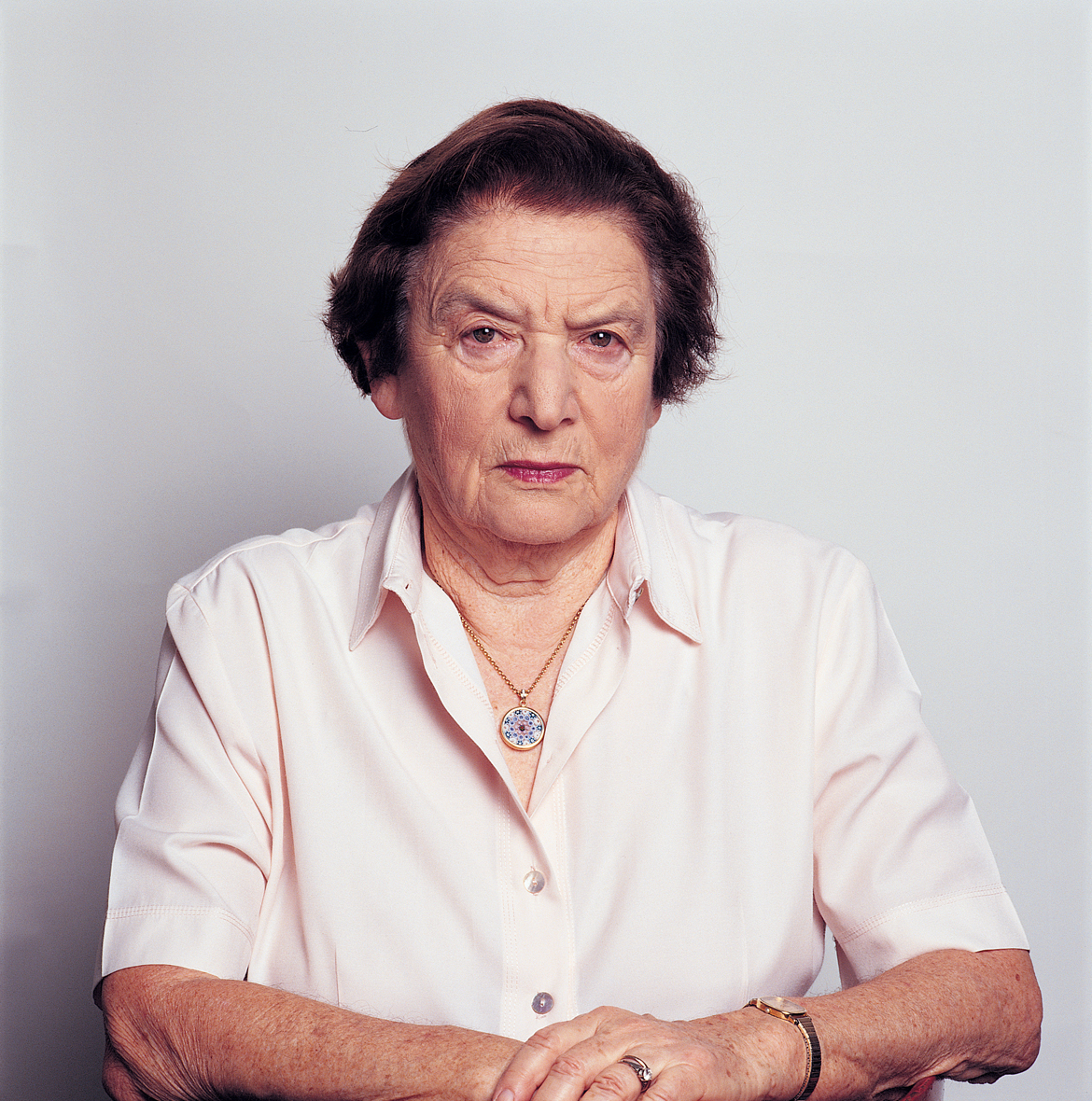
- Born: 2 July 1924; Vienna, Austria
- Died: 23 February 2026 (aged 101)
- Education: Hebrew University of Jerusalem
- Occupations: Scientist, professor emerita
- Employer(s): Ben-Gurion University of the Negev; Weizmann Institute of Science
- Known for: Contributions to thermodynamics and separation processes
- Awards: Israel Prize (life sciences, 1961); National Academy of Engineering member (2005)

Ora Kedem (Hebrew: אורה קדם; 2 July 1924 – 23 February 2026) was an Austrian-born Israeli chemist who was a professor at the Weizmann Institute of Science and Ben-Gurion University of the Negev, and a recipient of the 1961 Israel Prize for life sciences.

== Biography ==
Josefa Katz (later Ora Kedem) was born in Vienna. Her mother was a seamstress and her father ran a perfume business. After the Anschluss, when Austria was annexed by the Nazis in 1938, the family businesses were closed down. Her brother and sister had already immigrated to Palestine with the Youth Aliya movement and her father immigrated in the framework of Aliya Bet. Kedem and her mother remained in Austria until 1940. Kedem, then 16 years old, boarded a ship on the Danube en route to Palestine.

== Scientific career ==
In 2005, she was elected a member of the National Academy of Engineering for contributions to the thermodynamics of irreversible transport processes and the development of separation processes for the treatment of water and wastewater.

Kedem died on 23 February 2026, at the age of 101.

== See also ==
- List of Israel Prize recipients
