= Joseph Algazy =

Israeli historian and journalist (1938–2026)

- יוסף אלגזי
- Born: 11 September 1938; Alexandria, Kingdom of Egypt
- Died: 18 July 2026 (aged 87)
- Education: Tel Aviv University
- Occupations: Historian; Journalist

Joseph Algazy (Hebrew: יוסף אלגזי; 11 September 1938 – 18 July 2026) was an Israeli historian and journalist.

Algazy graduated and taught at Tel Aviv University before joining daily newspaper Haaretz. He also collaborated with Le Monde diplomatique.

Algazy died on 18 July 2026, at the age of 87.

== Publications ==
- La Tentation néofasciste en France (1944-1965) (1984)
- L'Extrême droite en France de 1965 à 1984 (1989)
- La Mauvaise conscience d'Israël (1994)
- Le péché originel d'Israël. L'expulsion des Palestiniens revisitée par les nouveaux historiens israéliens (1998)
- Mémoires d'un village palestinien disparu (2002)
- Par-delà les murs : un réfugié palestinien et un Israélien revisitent leur histoire (2005)
- Haqwrban. Siywrey pniym wšaʿar (2006)
