= Sheffi Paz =

Israeli anti-immigration activist (1952–2026)

- שפי פז
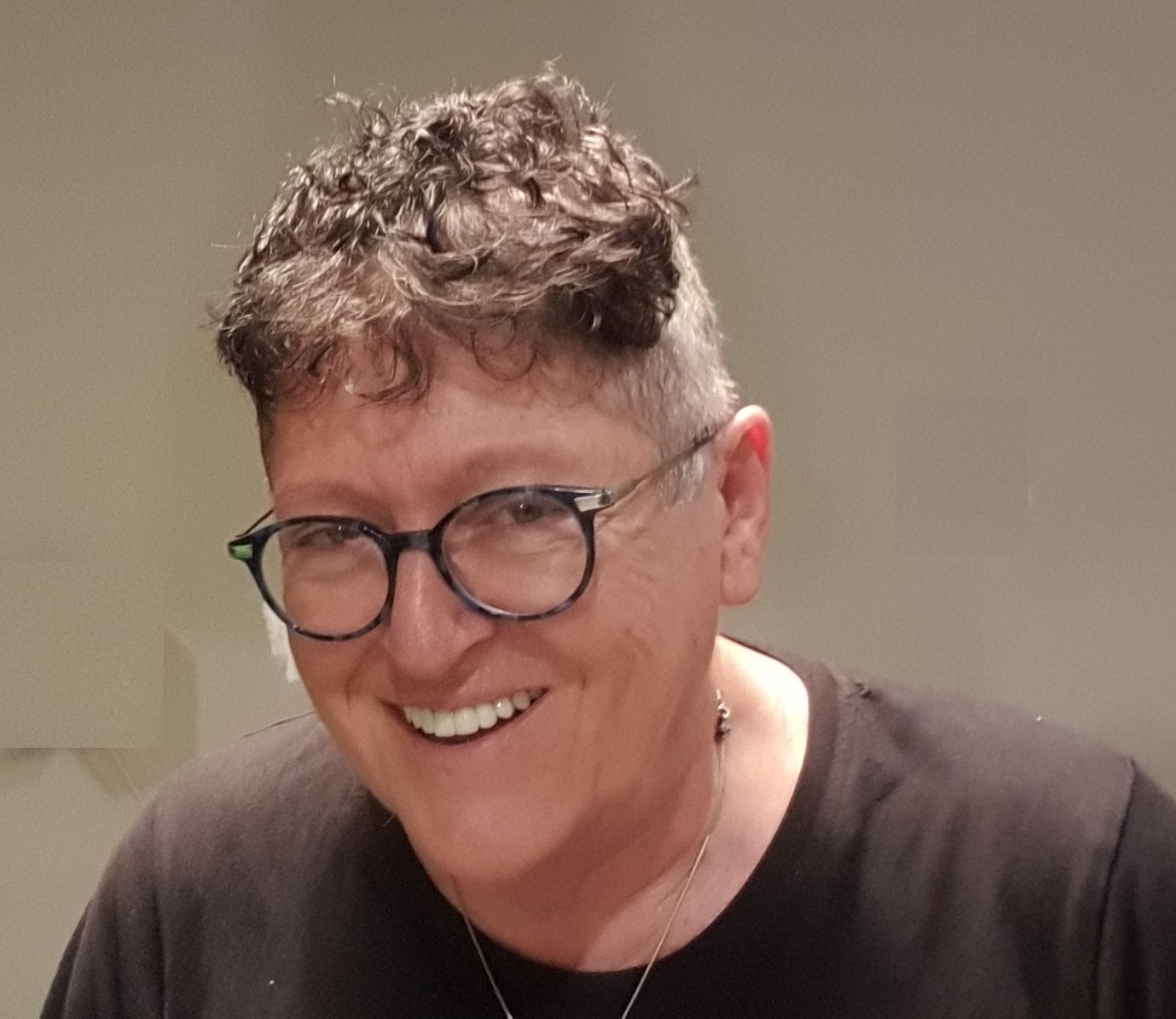
- Paz in 2020
- Born: 18 June 1952; Łódź, Poland
- Died: 26 October 2026 (aged 74)
- Occupation: Editor
- Known for: Opposing illegal immigration to Israel

Sheffi Paz (Hebrew: שפי פז; 18 June 1952 – 26 October 2026) was an Israeli activist against illegal African immigration to Israel, living in south Tel Aviv. In the past she was a left-wing human rights activist.

== Early life ==
Paz was born in Łódź, Poland on 18 June 1952, to Holocaust survivor parents. At the age of four she moved to Israel with her parents, and grew up in Holon, Israel. She participated in the youth movement Hashomer Hatzair. After the Six-Day War, when she was 15, she participated in protests in Tel Aviv supporting Israeli settlements. For her mandatory military service in the Israel Defense Forces, she served in the Technology and Maintenance Corps.

== Early activism ==
After coming out as a lesbian, Paz became a left-wing activist and was a member of the Meretz party for decades. She demonstrated with Peace Now in Sebastia against the settlers of Elon Moreh, against Israeli settlements, and in the summer of 2011 she participated in the Israeli social justice protests. Paz was a lesbian activist for LGBT rights, and was a member of the feminist lesbian association Klaf. She participated in protest shifts outside of the house of then-president Ezer Weizman, after he made homophobic public statements, and she stood on the side of drag queens in the Israeli Wigstock riots of 1998.

Until 1995 she lived next to Habima Theatre. In 1996 she and her partner chose to move to the Shapira neighborhood in south Tel Aviv, because of its multicultural and diverse nature. In her words, she was friendly with members of the immigrant population, particularly with two Nigerian families in her building. In 2002, during a wave of deportations ordered by Ariel Sharon, she even hid a Nigerian migrant in her house when the immigration police were spread out in the area. Later, however, her views began to change, and she became active in anti-refugee organizations.

In the municipal elections for Tel Aviv city council in 2013, Paz came in sixth place among candidates of the "Southern Faction" party. The party won one seat and did not enter the city council.

== Anti-immigration activism ==
=== The South Tel Aviv Liberation Front ===
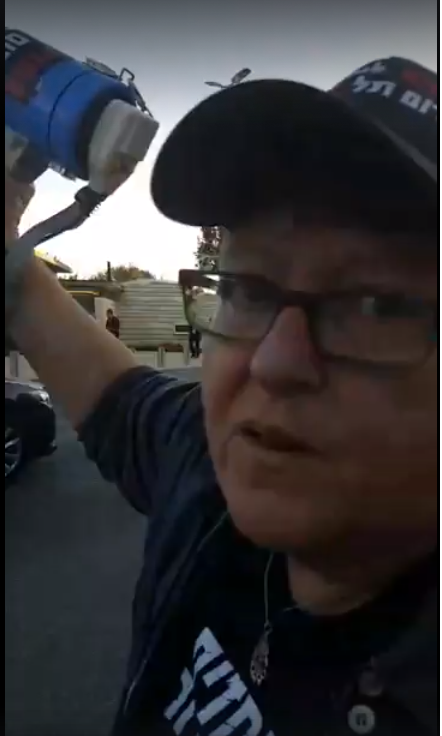
Sheffi Paz in a demonstration opposite the President of Israel's house in Talbiya, Jerusalem, October 2017

From 2012, Paz had a significant role in the movement against African immigration to Israel, as a member of the organization "Otef Tahana HaMerkazit". Paz led a branch of the organization, which calls itself the "South Tel Aviv Liberation Front". She was interviewed by the media, organized violent protests and hung signs with the goal of convincing the Israeli public that the migrant population in south Tel Aviv caused serious problems for the native residents. She often used violent means, including pepper-spraying a guard at an elementary school, threatening an Israeli Supreme Court justice, vandalizing the home of the Chief Justice of the Israeli Supreme Court, vandalizing the European Union office in Israel, and breaking into preschools for migrant children.

With this goal she partnered with various right-wing Israeli organizations. She protested the migrants' use of public parks and schools. She frequently violently confronted and harassed human rights activists that advocate for refugees, claiming that they are violating the rights of the Jewish, low socio-economic class residents, who feel abandoned by the state and city governments. Although she voted for Meretz for decades, her radical views and actions, along with her confrontations with the Israeli left, had pushed her political views rightwards.

From August 2017, Paz led weekly demonstrations opposite the house of the former head of the Supreme Court of Israel, Miriam Naor, in Rehavia, Jerusalem, and outside the house of the current head Esther Hayut in Tzahala, north Tel Aviv. In November 2017 she was arrested during a protest that she led opposite the house of the head of the Supreme Court.

Paz had had numerous encounters with African migrants in which she allegedly incited violence, and had been arrested 14 times as a result of her violent behavior. In a 2016 interview with Hilo Glazer from Haaretz newspaper, she openly admitted to siding with activists who call for "Death to the Sudanese!" She also had a restraining order placed against her by social activist Sigal Avivi.

In October 2017 Paz created a crowdfunding campaign in order to fund activism against African migrants, which raised about 500 thousand shekels.

=== Indictments ===
In September 2019, Paz and bereaved mother Meirav Hajaj vandalised the entrance of office of the European Union delegation in Israel. They spray-painted slogans in red paint which read: "EU get out" and "German money kill Jews" [sic]. In January 2020, Paz and her co-conspirators were charged with conspiring to commit a crime, intentionally causing property damage and vandalism.

In December 2020, Paz was also indicted for breaking into a preschool for migrant children and endangering children. The offences cited in the indictment include destruction of property, obstructing an investigation, criminal conspiracy, breaking and entering and invasion of privacy. In preparation for this break-in, Paz and her fellow anti-immigration activists wrote to one-another blatantly racist messages including “thumbtacks should be scattered in the preschools and not the roads so as not to injure the white residents.” Paz also planned for future graffiti, of which she said: “What’s important is that it be offensive toward the children.”

== Death ==
Paz died from cancer on 26 October 2026, at the age of 74.
