= Mental health impact of the Gaza war =

The mental health impact of the Gaza war is an ongoing public health crisis characterized by widespread psychological trauma across the Middle East. This crisis includes the collapse of mental health infrastructure in the Gaza Strip and a 30% surge of psychiatric cases in Israel.

In Gaza, mental health experts consider the traditional Post Traumatic Stress Disorder (PTSD) insufficient due to the lack of a "post-trauma" environment. They instead use chronic traumatic stress disorder (CTSD) to diagnose a population facing prolonged indefinite bombardment and displacement.

Among IDF personnel, the war has led to a rise in "moral injury," meaning distress arising from actions that transgress deeply held moral beliefs. Suicides of veterans and active-duty officers prompted national debates about the "invisible costs" of the state's longest war. Following the October 7 attacks, survivors, particularly from the Nova music festival, experienced psychological distress, with multiple survivor suicides in 2024 and 2025.

Regardless of the 2025 ceasefire agreements, mental health remains in an "acute escalation phase" as of 2026. The psychological burden will likely persist for decades after the cessation of physical hostilities, according to health officials.

== Impact in Palestine ==
=== Civilians in Gaza ===
==== Diagnostic framework ====
Traditional diagnostic framework of post-traumatic stress disorder insufficiently meets conditions in the strip. As Dr. Yasser Abu-Jamei, the head of the Gaza Community Mental Health Programme, stated, meaningful recovery requires a permanent ceasefire and a sense of safety. Practitioners proposed chronic traumatic stress disorder (CTSD) as an alternative, a condition first identified in apartheid-era South Africa, to diagnose a population facing indefinite trauma rather than a past event. UNRWA described Gaza's trauma as "chronic and unrelenting" following three hundred days of war. The organization characterized the mental health crisis as a collective embodiment of CTSD where Palestinians in Gaza had mentally adapted to chronic danger.

==== Psychological toll ====
A longitudinal cohort study published in eClinicalMedicine in December 2025 followed 677 adults across three surveys in 2020, 2023, and January 2025. The proportion which met the threshold for high psychological distress remained stable between 2020 (19.5%) and 2023 (17.4%). It more than tripled to 67.2% by early 2025, which represents twelve times higher odds of severe distress in comparison to pre-war levels. The increase stayed consistent across all subgroups regardless of age or gender. By early 2025, over 99% of participants experienced at least one displacement with a median of four displacements.

A cross-sectional study published in Scientific Reports in January 2026 surveyed 788 adult Palestinian war survivors. Researchers found an overall prevalence of moderate-to-severe depression of 82%, with 37% experiencing severe depression. The study compared 405 participants who remained in Gaza with 383 who fled. Those who fled reported significantly higher rates of moderate-to-severe depression (90.9%) compared to those who remained (72.6%). Nearly half of the fled group was classified as severe. Over 20% of all respondents reported suicidal ideation near-daily. Key risk factors were loss of a family member, forced displacement, and youth.

A separate study in Conflict and Health, surveyed 405 adults in Gaza between November 2024 and January 2025. 73% reported moderate-to-severe depression, 65% moderate-to-severe anxiety, and 83.5% met the threshold for probable PTSD. More than half of respondents (54%) experienced all three conditions simultaneously. Bereaved participants were nearly twice as likely to experience depression and anxiety. Those who had witnessed casualties – killings or injuries – were three times likelier to report severe anxiety. Residents of northern Gaza, who endured intense military operations, reported higher rates of depression and anxiety.

==== Infrastructure collapse ====
A 2025 study in Frontiers in Public Health documented more than 1,000 attacks on health facilities since October 2023. On November 5, 2023, Gaza's sole psychiatric hospital was no longer functioning after it was damaged in an Israeli attack. This destruction cut off care for an estimated half a million Palestinians with mental health conditions. The Gaza Community Mental Health Programme continued functioning through the war and genocide. After Israeli bombardment destroyed its Gaza City headquarters and its Khan Younis site, the organization relocated to rented premises. Its staff of about one hundred, many themselves internally displaced, continued to operate across Gaza.

Dr. Bahzad al-Akhras is a child and adolescent psychiatrist who lost his home to an Israeli strike in early 2024. He treated approximately fifty patients daily from a tented space in Al-Mawasi after he was displaced multiple times. Mental health manager Nour Jarada worked from medical tents with no sound insulation. She treated patients who arrived on foot, and some had walked for miles to receive medical care. 'Some don't speak,' she told the New Yorker. 'They stare, sometimes scream. Most cry for hours, unblinkingly.'

Médecins Sans Frontières conducted nearly 50,000 individual mental health consultations in Gaza between October 2023 and early 2026. This was done as part of the organization's operations across two hospitals, two field hospitals, and six primary healthcare centers.

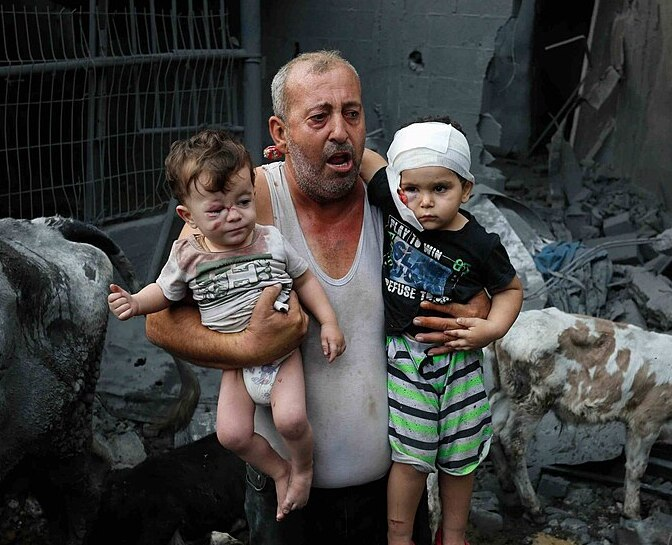
A Palestinian refugee carries his injured grandchildren from the Israeli bombing of Nuseirat Camp, Gaza Strip. UNICEF estimated that by 2024, almost all of Gaza's 1.2 million children required urgent mental health and psychosocial support

==== Impact on children ====
By 2024, almost all of Gaza's 1.2 million children required urgent mental health and psychosocial support, which UNICEF's spokesperson noted was a crisis that had never been reached anywhere in the world. By February 2024, at least 17,000 children were unaccompanied or separated from their families; by 2025, more than 50,000 children had been killed or injured. In February 2024, the United Nations Committee on the Rights of the Child called for "massive psychosocial support" for Gaza's children. The committee warn that their rights were being "violated at a level rarely seen in recent history."

96% of children living through the war felt their death was imminent, and nearly half reported wanting to die in November 2024. A 2022 Save the Children survey had already found that 84% of children in Gaza felt fear and 78% lived with grief. Clinicians treated children who stopped speaking, stopped crying, or developed speech problems. Some children played games called "air strike," re-enacted bombings with stones, and played pretend death and burial. Child psychologist Arwa al-Sakafi and clinical psychologist Ghadeer el-Shurafa treated teenagers with suicidal ideation and groups of displaced girls who, when asked to choose a color for their feelings, predominantly chose to use black or dark purple and drew tanks, mothers, and blood.

UNESCO supported mental health and psychosocial interventions for 1,200 displaced children and adolescents in Gaza's internally displaced camps. At a Palestine Red Crescent Society mental health center, staff called it one of the few places where children in Gaza could play and feel safe.

In February 2026, Nisreen Qawas, a psychologist with the Palestine Red Crescent Society, called the crisis a "psychological injury of an entire generation." She noted that, at the time of publication, at least 39,300 children had lost parents and over650,000 had no access to schooling.

=== Civilians in the West Bank ===
Clinicians in the West Bank saw a surge in patients presenting with somatic manifestations of anxiety and PTSD. This included sensory symptoms such as bitter tastes, throat dryness, and physical tremors with no identifiable physical cause. The monthly patient load of Women4Women, a mobile healthcare program serving rural communities in the Hebron region, rose from approximately 500 to 2,000 following October 2023. This increase, according to practitioners, was partly because of added checkpoints and road closures, economic disruption, and a pervasive fear about the war spreading to the West Bank. Children in the West Bank role-played the war and experienced nightmares about military raids on their homes.

== Impact in Israel ==
=== October 7 attacks and survivors ===
The October 7 attacks produced psychological trauma among Israeli civilians, particularly survivors of the Nova music festival massacre, where 364 of approximately 4,000 festival attendees were killed. the Tribe of Nova Foundation was established within two weeks of the attack to support survivors. The foundation organized weekly support gatherings and raised over $3 million for survivor services, Survivors had prolonged symptoms such as hypervigilance, panic attacks, and an inability to return to work. In some cases, they could not leave their homes a year after the attack. Researchers at the University of Haifa launched a study on the effect of psychedelic drugs during traumatic events, as many of the Nova festival attendees were under the influence of psychedelic drugs during the attack. Multiple Nova festival survivors committed suicide in 2024 and 2025. Claims that as many as 50 survivors had died by suicide circulated in April 2024, and landed before a Knesset committee. However, they were denied by Israel's Ministry of Health. Social media users, including the German ambassador to Israel, shared a fabricated suicide note purportedly written by a survivor. The letter was then debunked by an investigation by Israel's Channel 13.

Psychological support centers in Gaza border communities were worn thin with a surge in demand that rose to twelve times pre-war monthly levels. Residents sounded the alarm about critical funding shortfalls amid the conflict. In November 2025, directors of the centers sent a letter to Prime Minister Benjamin Netanyahu which labelled planned budget cuts as "national irresponsibility." They warned that such budget cuts would dismantle support systems built since October 7. The Health Ministry responded that the cuts reflected a reduction in supplementary wartime funding, not base budgets.

==== Notable cases ====
Shirel Golan, a 22-year-old Nova festival survivor, was found dead on her birthday on October 20, 2024. Golan was hospitalized twice at Lev Hasharon Psychiatric Hospital in Pardesiya but was never officially recognized as a PTSD victim of the Nova massacre by the state. Her brother Eyal alleged that she had been beaten by hospital security guards months before her death and shared photos of bruises on her body. The hospital denied the allegations and established an inspection committee.

Roei Shalev, another Nova festival survivor, died by suicide on October 10, 2025 at age 30, two years after the massacre. In a final message, he described feeling that "everything inside me is dead." His former girlfriend, Mapal Adam, was killed in the attack and Shalev was shot as he tried to shield her. Shalev's mother also took her own life two weeks after the Hamas attack.

=== Military personnel ===
By September 2025, approximately 20,000 veterans injured in the conflict were treated by the Defense Ministry's Rehabilitation Division. Of those, 55%, or roughly 10,700, suffered from mental health issues. The division projected that in 2028 it would have to treat 100,000 injured veterans. Half of those were expected to have mental health conditions. This timeline was accelerated by two years due to the war's prolonged nature. Each rehabilitation social worker carried a caseload of approximately 750 patients due to a chronic staff shortage. In response, a wave of grassroots civilian organizations emerged to supplement the overburdened official system. This included therapeutic farms using animal-assisted therapy, rehabilitation ranches, and holistic retreat programs.

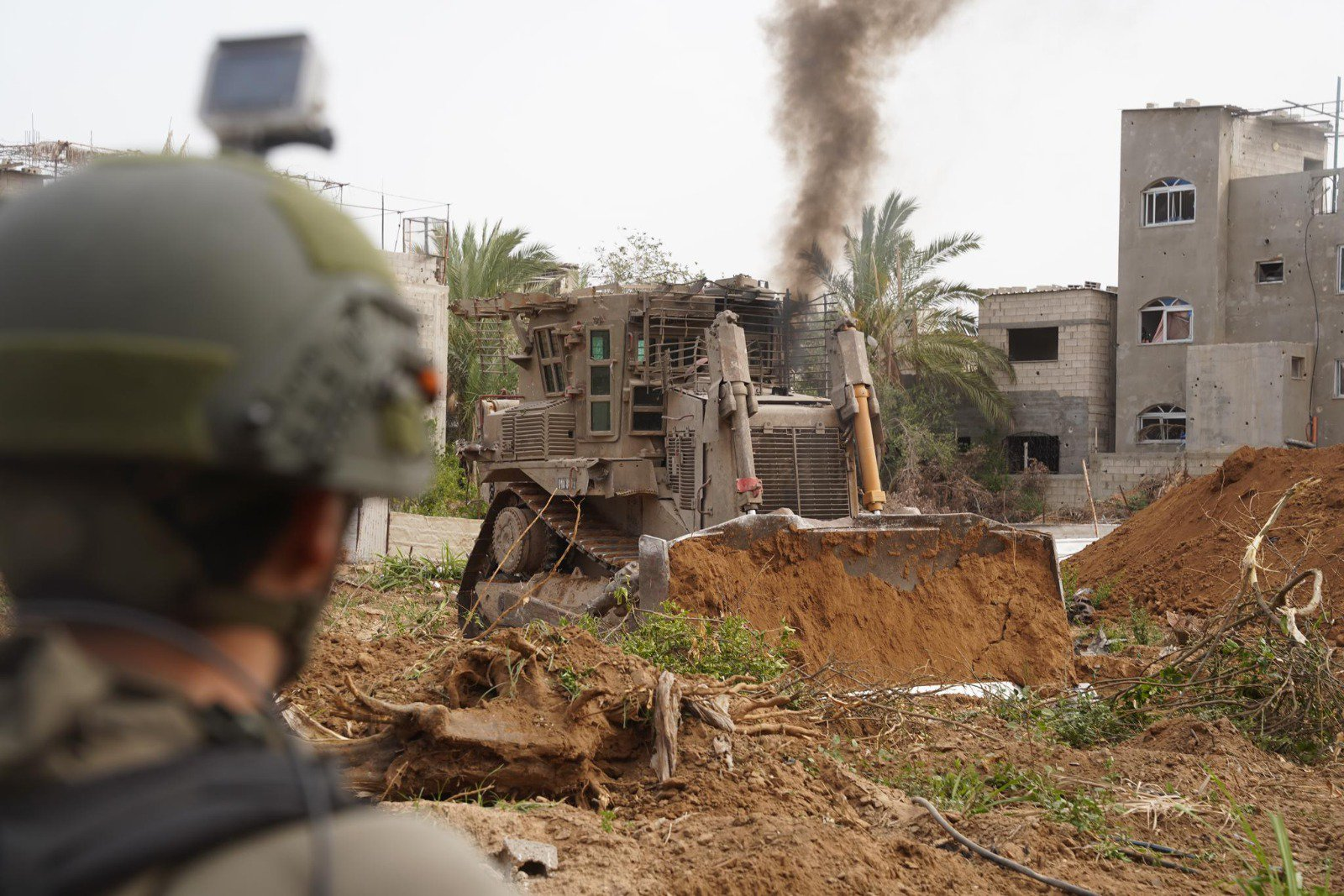
An IDF D9N armored bulldozer during a raid on the Zaitoun neighbourhood of Gaza City, May 2024

Suicides among active duty and reserve soldiers rose sharply. In the decade before the war, the national average was 13 soldier suicides per year; this rose to 24 in 2024 and at least 20 in the first part of 2025. Haaretz reporters found at least 15 discharged soldiers who died by suicide since the war began due to mental health problems linked to their service. They noted that the true figure was likely higher since many cases go unreported. A parliamentary report noted that 279 soldiers attempted suicide between January 2024 and July 2025.

Researchers and clinicians identified structural factors driving this surge in mental health with IDF soldiers. Repeated deployments meant soldiers were called back to Gaza while undergoing treatment for PTSD. Clinicians documented "moral injury," meaning psychological distress arising from actions that transgressed soldiers' deeply held moral beliefs, as a phenomenon separate from standard PTSD. Stigma around mental health remained a persistent barrier to treatment, though this factor was diminished compared to historical conflicts.

==== Notable cases ====
Eliran Mizrahi, a 40-year-old combat engineering reservist and father of four, was deployed to Gaza on October 8, 2023, the day after the Hamas attack. He drove a D-9 bulldozer and later helped evacuate bodies from the Nova music festival site. After sustaining injuries and during approximately 186 days in Gaza, he developed PTSD and began weekly therapy. Despite his diagnosis, he received an emergency call-up order to redeploy. He took his own life on June 7, 2024, which was two days before his ordered return. The IDF initially refused to grant him a military burial, stating that he was not on active duty at the time of his death. This decision was later reversed following widespread social protest in Israel.

Some international commenters, however, argued that humanizing narratives about soldiers' trauma, particularly in Mizrahi's case, obscured accountability questions regarding their conduct in Gaza. Jehad Abusalim, director of the Institute for Palestine Studies and a native of Gaza, argued that Western media humanized Israeli soldiers while neglecting the legal and humanitarian implications of their actions.

Tomas Adzgauskas, a former IDF officer who fought during the October 7 attack and was later deployed in Gaza, died by suicide on December 3, 2025. His body was found in a park in Ashdod. He was recognized by the Defense Ministry's Rehabilitation Department as suffering from mental health problems and had undergone treatment. In posts before his death, he wrote that October 7 had "ruined everything I had been" and that he had "done unforgivable things" he could not live with. Similarly to Mizrahi, the IDF initially declined to recognize him as a fallen soldier before reversing its decision.

=== Broader civilian mental health in Israel ===
According to a January 2026 report by Israel's Health Ministry, psychiatric cases surged by 30% since October 2023. A survey of 1,024 residents in September 2025 found that 50% of respondents required psychological support since the war's outbreak. This number rose to 71% among Gaza border community residents. The same survey found that 72% of respondents feared a repeat attack, those living near the Gaza Strip reported 83%. 57% reported sleep problems and unemployment in particularly affected communities doubled from 13% to 28%. Among children, 49% of parents reported sleep disorders and 43% reported concentration difficulties at school.
