= Jerusalem Is Proud to Present =

- Theatrical release poster
- Directed by: Nitzan Gilady
- Written by: Nitzan Gilady
- Produced by: Galia Bador, Nitzan Gilady
- Edited by: Daniel Avitzur
- Music by: Ofir Leibovitch
- Release date: July 29, 2008 (San Francisco Jewish Film Festival)
- Country: Israel
- Language: Hebrew

Jerusalem Is Proud to Present is a 2008 documentary film directed by Nitzan Gilady about the 2006 World Pride Festival, an LGBT festival held in Jerusalem. It follows the lives of members of the Open House, Jerusalem's LGBT community center, who are planning the events, the threats they and their families receive, but refuse to back down. The poster of the documentary features a young Israeli man who vows to lead the parade despite having been stabbed by a fanatic at a previous parade.

The film relates the controversy over the festival, with orthodox Jews, evangelical Christians, and conservative Muslims united in their dislike of a gay festival being held in a city they consider holy. The film had its U.S. premiere at the San Francisco Jewish Film Festival on 29 July 2008, and showed in 60 film festivals winning prizes.

== Awards ==
- "Best Out Standing Documentary at Outfest
- Audience Award and Honorable Mention at Seattle LGBT Film Festival
