= Yehuda Atlas =

Israeli writer, poet and translator (1937–2026)

- יהודה אטלס
- Born: 12 February 1937; Ein Iron, Mandatory Palestine
- Died: 24 September 2026 (aged 89)
- Occupations: Writer, poet, translator, journalist and scholar of children’s literature

Yehuda Atlas (Hebrew: יהודה אטלס; February 12, 1937 – September 24, 2026) was an Israeli writer, poet, translator, journalist and scholar of children’s literature. His most recognizable book, Vehayeled Haze Hu Any (And This Child Is Me), was published in 1977.

Over the years, Atlas wrote dozens of books, translated classics, researched and edited children’s literature. He received numerous awards, including the Leah Goldberg Prize, the Prime Minister’s Prize for Hebrew Writers, the ACUM Lifetime Achievement Award, and many more.

Atlas died on September 24, 2026, at the age of 89.
