= David Federman =

Israeli stockbroker (1944–2026)

David Federman (Hebrew: דייוויד פדרמן; September 24, 1944 – February 8, 2026) was an Israeli stockbroker and basketball club owner.

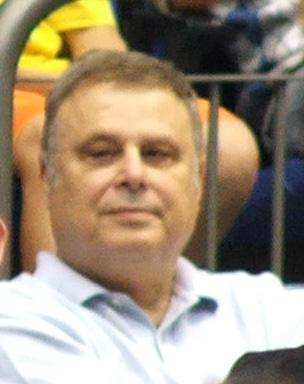
Federman during a Maccabi Tel Aviv game in 2011

== Life and career ==
Federman was born in Tel Aviv on September 24, 1944. Together with ED&F Man, Federman acquired control of Elite Industries Ltd, one of the largest food companies in Israel. In 1987, he completed the acquisition of control of Elite. In the same year, Federman returned to London for a period of six years, during which he was appointed CEO of ED&F Man's coffee division and a member of the board of directors of this group. He served in the position from 1989 to 1993.

At the beginning of the 21st century, Federman took over Israel Petrochemical Enterprises Ltd. in Israel and entered through it into the purchase of the control core of the Haifa refineries and other transactions. In 2013, the petrochemical company ran into difficulties due to the bad economic results of the Haifa refineries. In 2014, an intention was announced to reach a debt arrangement in the company, in which the shareholders, including Federman, were significantly diluted.

He owned 29% of Maccabi Tel Aviv Basketball Club and was a member of the board of directors, previously serving as the club's vice chairman.

Federman died on February 8, 2026, at the age of 81.
