= Nitzan Gilady =

Israeli film director (1969/1970–2026)

Nitzan Gilady (also known as Nitzan Giladi; Hebrew: ניצן גלעדי, 1969 or 1970 – 6 July 2026) was an Israeli film director who wrote, produced and directed the documentary films In Satmar Custody (2003), Jerusalem Is Proud to Present (2008), The Last Enemy and It Runs in the Family (2010).

His films have received 13 international awards, participated in over 120 international film festivals and been broadcast on television channels across the world, including Sundance Channel and ZDF-ARTE. His TV work includes: Singing to Oblivion - The Story of Miri Aloni, Do Not Call Me Black 2008 and Dark Southern Deal.

The short fiction drama Queens Up directed by Gilady has participated at the international Jerusalem Film Festival and received an Audience Award at Sedicicorto - Forli International film festival.

In 2004, he received a grant for the art of cinema initiated by the Israeli Ministry of Education, Culture and Sport given to outstanding Israeli filmmakers and film professionals.

Gilady was a graduate of the Academy of Arts "Circle in the Square" in New York and was a senior lecturer for eight years at the Visual Communication Department of the Holon Institute of Technology.

Gilady died on 6 July 2026, at the age of 56.

== Filmography ==
=== Director ===
- 1999: The Last Enemy (documentary)
- 2003: In Satmar Custody (documentary)
- 2007: Zugaim dama (TV movie)
- 2008: Jerusalem Is Proud to Present (documentary)
- 2010: It runs in the Family (documentary)
- 2015: Wedding Doll, winner of the Anat Pirchi Award for Best First Film and Honorary Mention to an Israeli Debut within the FIPRESCI Award for Best First Film at the 2015 Jerusalem Film Festival

=== Producer ===
- 2003: In Satmar Custody
- 2008: Jerusalem Is Proud to Present
- 2015: Wedding Doll

=== Actor ===
- 1997: Dream Land as Kamael
- 1999: Shabbat as Yoni (short)
