= Zeev Nehari =

Mathematician specializing in complex analysis and differential equations

- Born: Willi Weissbach; February 2, 1915
- Died: 1978
- Known for: Nehari manifold
- Scientific career
- Fields: Complex analysis, Univalent functions, Differential equations, Integral equations
- Doctoral advisor: Michael (Mihály) Fekete

Zeev Nehari (born Willi Weissbach; 2 February 1915 – 1978) was a mathematician who worked on Complex Analysis, Univalent Functions Theory, and Differential and Integral Equations. He was a student of Michael (Mihály) Fekete. The Nehari manifold is named after him.

== Selected publications ==
- Weissbach, Willi (1941), On certain classes of analytic functions and the corresponding conformal representations, Summary of a thesis, Hebrew University, Jerusalem, MR 0017371
- Nehari, Zeev (1949), "The Schwarzian derivative and schlicht functions", Bulletin of the American Mathematical Society, 55 (6): 545–551, doi:10.1090/S0002-9904-1949-09241-8, ISSN 0002-9904, MR 0029999
- Nehari, Zeev (1952), "Some inequalities in the theory of functions", Transactions of the American Mathematical Society, 1953, Vol.75, pp. 256–286.
- Nehari, Zeev (1968), Introduction to complex analysis, Revised edition, Boston, Mass.: Allyn and Bacon Inc., MR 0224780
- Nehari, Zeev (1975) [1952], Conformal mapping, New York: Dover Publications, ISBN 978-0-486-61137-2, MR 0377031
