= Colombia–Israel relations =

Bilateral relations

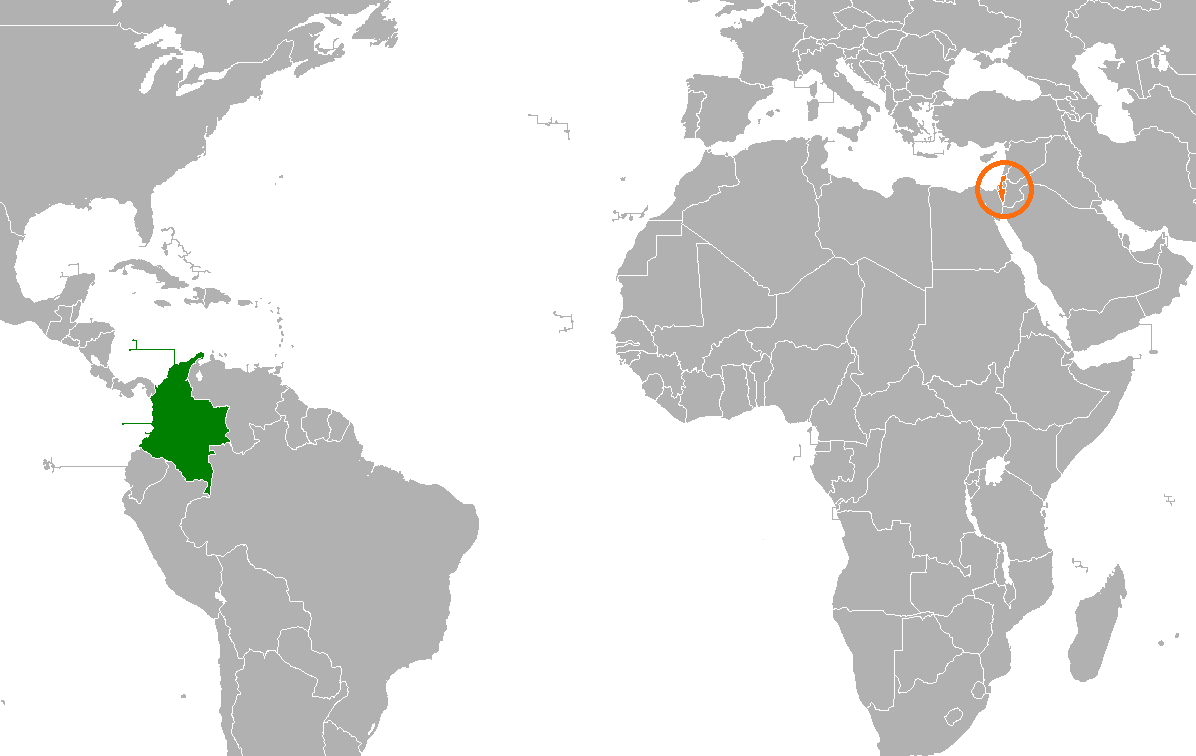
- Colombia: Israel

Diplomatic mission
- Embassy of Colombia, Jerusalem: Embassy of Israel, Bogotá

Colombia–Israel relations are the diplomatic relations between Colombia and Israel which were officially established on 1 July 1957. As of October 2026, Colombia is the second UN member state to recognize the Golan Heights as Israeli territory, and the tenth country to have its embassy in Jerusalem.

== General ==
In an article in the Israel Journal of Foreign Affairs, Marcos Peckel, a Colombian scholar noted that Colombian-Israeli relations can be looked through the lenses of military cooperation, trade links, education and culture, and recognition of Palestine. Militarily, Colombia was one of the first countries to give Israel weapons and engage in arms deals, which continued as a bilateral agreement. Since then, Israel and Colombia shared intelligence, and as Peckel explains, several pieces of Israeli technology. Trade-wise, both countries had a strong relationship.

The spheres of education and culture between Colombia and Israel are interwoven through Israeli scholarships to Colombians and a presence of media in each country.

Colombia's military has numerous weapon and ammunition types produced and/or maintained by Israel, including the Rafael Advanced Defense Systems Spike missile, Israel Weapons Industries-made 5.56mm Galil automatic rifle machine gun and 7.62mm Galil sniper rifle, Rafael Python-3 and Python-4, Israel Aerospace Industries Kfir fighter jets, and has signed up for the Barak MX air defense system.

Colombia has purchased planes, drones, weapons, and intelligence systems from Israel.

== History ==
In 1947, during a United Nations General Assembly session, General Assembly Resolution 181 recommended the partition of British Mandate Palestine into one Jewish and one Arab state Colombia abstained.

In the mid-1950s, both countries officially established diplomatic relations and set up embassies in Bogotá and Tel Aviv respectively. Relations improved in 1988, when major trade agreements were signed between Israel and Colombia. A Free Trade agreement was signed on 10 June 2013. However, it has not yet been ratified by Colombia and therefore is not yet in force. This agreement reduces tariffs on industrial and agricultural products between the two countries, and enable Israeli companies and individuals to invest with greater ease in the Colombia economy, considered to be second-biggest economy of South America. Israeli exports to Colombia totaled some US$143 million in 2012, and consisted mostly of communications equipment, machinery, electrical and mechanical devices and chemical products.

Colombia supported the aspiration of the Palestinian people to establish themselves as a free and independent state in the region. Additionally, Israel was Colombia's main partner in the region and was Colombia's second-largest trading partner in South America after Brazil. Bilateral relations have deepened through high-level visits in recent history.

On 13 September 2017, Israeli Prime Minister Benjamin Netanyahu paid an official visit to Colombia.

Until 2018, Colombia was one of the few remaining governments in Latin America that did not recognize Palestine as a state.

Israeli President Isaac Herzog welcomed Colombian President Iván Duque on a state visit to Israel in November 2021. Hosting Duque at the President's Residence in Jerusalem, Herzog commended Colombia's support for Israel and expressed his hopes to boost their bilateral trading relationship. At the state dinner, Herzog paid tribute to Duque's leadership in fighting "terror and rogue organizations affiliated with Iran and narco organizations." During the state visit, Duque inaugurated a Colombian innovation office in Jerusalem, a step that President Herzog welcomed in their joint statements.

On 15 October 2023 Israel halted all security exports to Colombia due to remarks of Colombian president Gustavo Petro comparing the Israeli military to Nazis during the Gaza war. The Guardian called it a "ferocious diplomatic spat". Colombia recalled its ambassador from Israel in condemnation of Israel's bombardment of Palestinian civilians in Gaza.

On 2 May 2024 during the Gaza war, president Gustavo Petro announced Colombia would break diplomatic ties with Israel, describing it as a genocide. In July 2025, Colombia hosted an emergency meeting of the Hague Group, a union of countries formed in January with the aim of holding Israel accountable for its crimes in Palestine.

"Colombia supports the establishment of an independent Palestinian state alongside Israel within mutually agreed-upon borders. It considers Israeli settlements in the West Bank illegal but strongly condemns Palestinian terrorism, and it advocates for a lasting peace based on the two-state solution". On resolutions in the UN General Assembly that compared Zionism to racism and wanted to establish a right of return for Palestinians, Colombia abstained. In 2018, Colombia officially recognized the State of Palestine through a declaration by the outgoing administration of Juan Manuel Santos, while the new Colombian president Iván Duque said that he would seek to "maintain the best possible relations with the state of Israel."

On 1 October 2025, in reaction to Israel's interception of the Global Sumud Flotilla, president Petro expelled all remaining diplomats.

On 7 August 2026, Sa'ar attended the inauguration ceremony of Colombia's President-elect de la Espriella. Ahead of his inauguration ceremony de la Espriella met Sa'ar at his office in Barranquilla.

On 10 August 2026, Colombia became the second country to recognize Israeli sovereignty over the Golan Heights, after a meeting between the Israeli foreign minister and Colombia's new government. The Israeli foreign minister also stated that he will continue to work for other countries to recognize "Israeli sovereignty" over the territory. The outgoing Colombian president Gustavo Petro apologized for the new governments declaration and stated that Israel had interfered in the Colombian election with software. Petro also stated that Espriella's restoration of ties to Israel "applauds the Gaza genocide". Colombia's recognition was condemned by Syria.

Days later in August 2026, at the request of President Abelardo de la Espriella, Israel immediately sent an 80-person delegation to aid with rescue efforts in the aftermath of the magnitude 7.4 earthquake, representing one of four nations for which Colombia specifically requested such assistance. That same month, Vivian Aisen was appointed as ambassador of Israel to Colombia. Starting 1 September 2026, citizens of Colombia and Israel may travel between the two countries without a visa. On 22 September, the ICJ confirmed that Colombia had withdrawn its support for South Africa's case against Israel. In October, Tania Gilinski was appointed Colombia's ambassador to Israel.

On 14 October 2026, Colombia officially relocated its embassy from Tel Aviv to Jerusalem, becoming the tenth country to do so. The embassy was opened in the Salameh Building on Rabbi Akiva Street. The two countries also re-established a free trade deal.

== See also ==
- Foreign relations of Colombia
- Foreign relations of Israel
- History of the Jews in Colombia
- International recognition of Israel
