= 2026 Jerusalem daycare deaths =

- Date: 19 January 2026
- Location: Romema, Jerusalem, Israel
- Deaths: 2

In January 2026, two babies were found dead in the Romema neighbourhood of Jerusalem.

Hundreds of Haredi men protested against proposals to perform autopsies on the deceased.

== Reactions ==
The editorial board of The Jerusalem Post said that the deaths were not an isolated accident, but the predictable outcome of long‑term governance failures, citing a critical report by State Comptroller Matanyahu Englman in 2022.

In response to the deaths, Education Minister Yoav Kisch establish an interagency task force to identify and close unlicensed daycare facilities.

Meir Porush introduced a bill in the Knesset to provide free education for Israeli toddlers.
