= Nehari manifold =

Manifold of functions in the calculus of variations

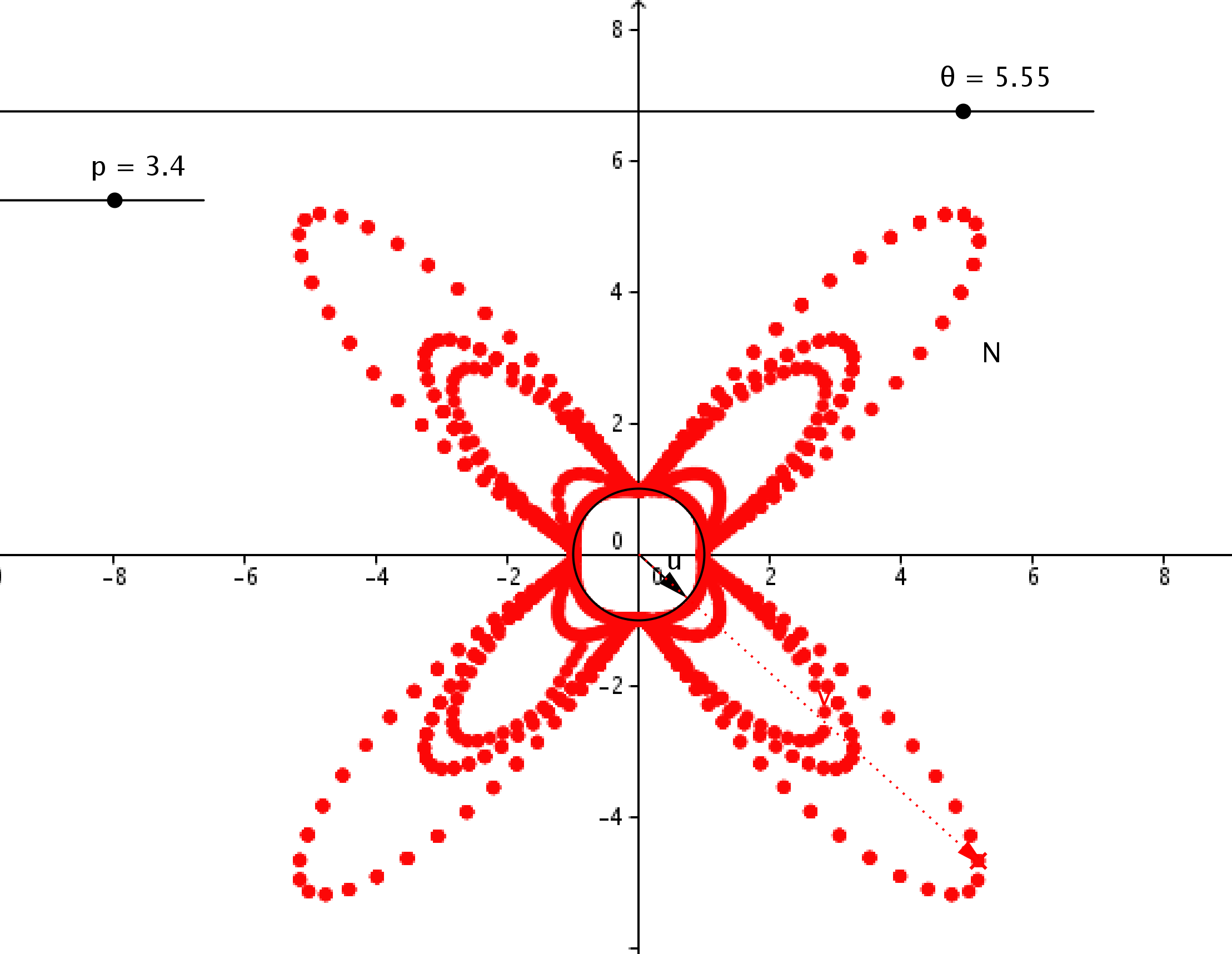
Nehari variety

In the calculus of variations, a branch of mathematics, a Nehari manifold is a manifold of functions, whose definition is motivated by the work of Zeev Nehari (1960, 1961). It is a differentiable manifold associated to the Dirichlet problem for the semilinear elliptic partial differential equation

$$-\triangle u  = |u|^{p-2}u,\text{ with  }u\mid_{\partial \Omega} = 0.$$

Here, Δ is the Laplacian on a bounded domain Ω in R^{n}.

There are infinitely many solutions to this problem. Solutions are precisely the critical points for the energy functional

$$J(v) = \frac12\int_{\Omega}{|\nabla v|^2\,d\mu}-\frac1{p+1}\int_{\Omega}{|v|^{p+1}\,d\mu}$$

on the Sobolev space H^{1}_{0}(Ω). The Nehari manifold is defined to be the set of v ∈ H^{1}_{0}(Ω) such that

$$\|\nabla v\|^2_{L^2(\Omega)} = \|v\|^{p+1}_{L^{p+1}(\Omega)} > 0.$$

Solutions to the original variational problem that lie in the Nehari manifold are (constrained) minimizers of the energy, and so direct methods in the calculus of variations can be brought to bear.

More generally, given a suitable functional J, the associated Nehari manifold is defined as the set of functions u in an appropriate function space for which

$$\langle J'(u), u\rangle = 0.$$

Here J′ is the functional derivative of J.
