= Shmuel Harlap =

Israeli businessman (1944–2026)

- שמואל חרל"פ
- Born: 13 November 1944; Mandatory Palestine
- Died: 19 August 2026 (aged 81)
- Education: Hebrew University of Jerusalem (1971), Harvard University (1975)
- Occupation: Businessman
- Known for: Chairman of the car importing company Colmobil Group

Shmuel Harlap (Hebrew: שמואל חרל"פ; 13 November 1944 – 19 August 2026) was an Israeli businessman, who was the chairman of the Colmobil Group (קבוצת כלמוביל), and an investor in startup companies. He held a Doctor of Philosophy degree from Harvard University.

== Early life and education ==
Harlap was born on 13 November 1944, and raised in Rehovot and Haifa. In the early 1960s, his father Amichai obtained a license to import Mercedes-Benz cars and started the car importer Colmobil. Harlap did his military service in the Golani Brigade and served in the Six Day War.

== Career ==
After completing a doctorate in philosophy at Harvard University, specializing in Platonic philosophy, he served as a lecturer in political science at the Hebrew University of Jerusalem.

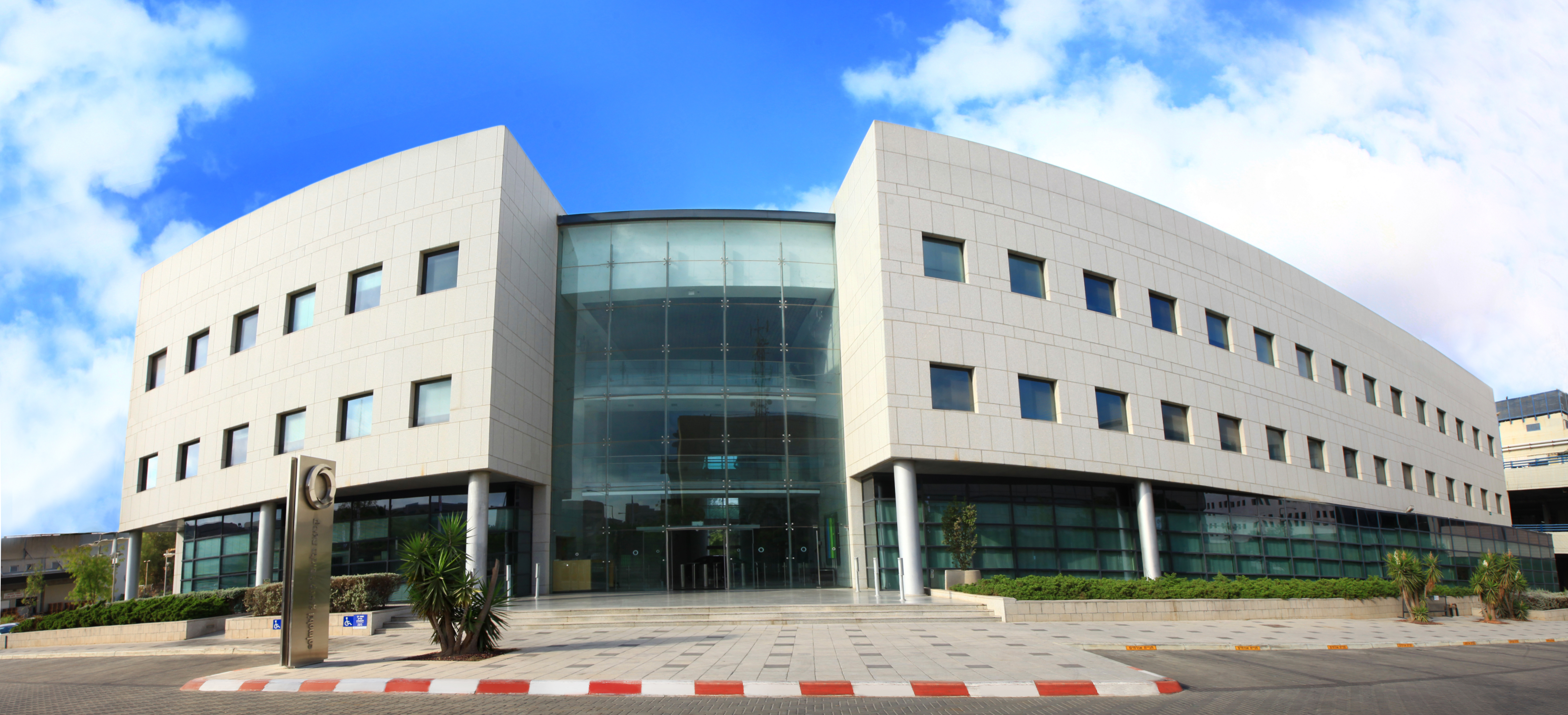
Colmobil headquarters in Rosh HaAyin

In 1982, he was appointed chairman of Colmobil. The company began importing the Japanese car brand Mitsubishi in 1988 and Hyundai vehicles in 1994. Colmobil eventually secured about 20% of the Israeli car market.

This success contributed to Harlap’s substantial personal wealth; in TheMarker magazine’s 2016 ranking of Israel’s richest people, he was placed 21st, with an estimated fortune of approximately US$1.5 billion. Harlap invested in startup companies; in 2017, his wealth doubled after Intel purchased Mobileye, for which he owned around 7% of the shares.

== Publications ==
Harlap published an op-ed on the Israeli-Palestinian conflict in Haaretz in 2017.

In 2018, Harlap joined other Israeli businessmen in condemning the Israeli government's plan to deport 40,000 African asylum-seekers.

Following the attacks of 7 October 2023, the Harlap family donated 120 Mitsubishi Space Star cars to the kibbutzim Nir Oz, Nahal Oz, Be'eri, and Kfar Aza.

== Death ==
Harlap died on 19 August 2026, at the age of 81.
