= Oren Nahari =

Israeli journalist and presenter (1955–2026)

Oren Nahari (Hebrew: אורן נהרי; 20 October 1955 – 13 August 2026) was an Israeli journalist. For many years, Nahari worked as a foreign affairs reporter and news anchor for Channel 1 and Reshet Bet Radio. He later hosted the A Year in an Hour podcast and radio show about twentieth-century history. Nahari died on 13 August 2026, less than a year after disclosing that he had been diagnosed with ALS. He was 70.
