= 2023 in Israel =

- Decades: 2000s; 2010s; 2020s
- See also: History of Israel; Timeline of Israeli history; List of years in Israel

The year 2023 in Israel was defined first by wide-scale protests against a proposed judicial reform, and then by the Hamas-led attack on Israel on October 7, which led to Gaza war and to Israel invading the Gaza Strip.

== Incumbents ==
- President of Israel – Isaac Herzog
- Prime Minister of Israel – Benjamin Netanyahu
- President of the Supreme Court – Esther Hayut
- Chief of General Staff – Herzi Halevi
- Government of Israel – Thirty-seventh government of Israel

== Ongoing ==
- Gaza war

== Events ==
=== January ===
- 1 January –
  - The second stage of the reform of Israel's kosher certification system that was scheduled to come into effect allowing the establishment of private kosher certification agencies to issue kosher certification is postponed by the new Shas party Minister of Religious Services, Michael Malchieli.
  - Two soldiers are killed during a series of Israeli airstrikes at Damascus International Airport.
  - Two Palestinians, Mohammad Samer Hoshiyeh, 22, and Fouad Mohammad Abed, 25, are killed and three more injured during confrontations with Israeli soldiers who stormed Kafr Dan to demolish the homes of two Palestinians killed in a shootout at a checkpoint in Jenin several months ago.
- 3 January – The visit of the Israeli Minister of National Security Itamar Ben-Gvir to the Temple Mount in Jerusalem sparks protests by Palestinians and the condemnation of several Arab countries.
- 4 January – Justice Minister Yariv Levin announces a comprehensive proposal to overhaul Israel's legal framework by limiting the authority of the Supreme Court of Israel with an override clause of 61 Knesset members, granting the government more significant influence over the judicial selection committee, permitting ministers to appoint their legal advisers independently, and cancelling the reasonableness standard.
- 7 January – Thousands of Israelis protest in Habima Square, initiating a series of protests against the proposed judicial reforms.
- 12 January – Israeli soldiers raid the village of Qabatiya in the West Bank, killing two Palestinian men. In a separate incident, Israeli forces arrest an 18-year-old Palestinian man and kill his father in the Qalandia refugee camp.
- 14 January – Over 80,000 Israelis demonstrate in Tel Aviv against the proposed judicial reform by the new government.
- 16 January –
  - Herzi Halevi is appointed the new IDF chief of staff.
  - Hamas publishes a video of Avera Mengistu, an Israeli held captive in Gaza since 2014; Hamas has been holding Mengistu and the bodies of IDF soldiers Oron Shaul and Hadar Goldin for nine years, and of Israeli Hisham al-Sayed for eight.
- 19 January –
  - A Palestinian teacher and a member of the Jenin Brigades are killed, and three others are injured, in a raid by Israeli soldiers at a refugee camp in Jenin, in the West Bank.
  - The Supreme Court of Israel bars Aryeh Deri from serving in Israel's cabinet due to his previous fraud convictions for tax offenses.
- 22 January –
  - The Lebanese Army declares a "state of alert" after stopping Israeli bulldozers and accompanying soldiers from approaching a border fence in Southern Lebanon. Peacekeeping forces from UNIFIL have also been deployed to the area.
  - Prime minister Benjamin Netanyahu dismisses health and interior minister Aryeh Deri from his cabinet following the Supreme Court's ruling.
- 26 January – Four Al-Qassam terrorists, three Islamic Jihad members and two Palestinian civilians are killed and 20 others are injured during a raid and subsequent gunfight by Israeli soldiers in Jenin, in the West Bank. In a separate raid in Al-Ram, a Palestinian man is killed and two others are injured by Israeli soldiers.
- 27 January –
  - 2023 East Jerusalem synagogue shooting: Seven Israelis are killed and ten more are injured in a mass shooting at a synagogue in Neve Yaakov, East Jerusalem; the Palestinian perpetrator is killed by police.
  - Israeli Air Force jets launch airstrikes on an underground rocket manufacturing site, and a military base used by Hamas in the Gaza Strip, in response to rockets fired by Palestinian militants into southern Israel.
- 28 January – Two Israelis are shot and critically injured by a 13-year-old Palestinian in East Jerusalem; the attacker is shot and injured by one of his victims before being arrested.
- 29 January –
  - Iran–Israel conflict during the Syrian civil war
    - Unidentified warplanes, suspected to be Israeli, strike a convoy of Iranian trucks that entered Syria from Iraq through the Al-Qa'im border crossing. At least six trucks are believed to have been destroyed. There are no immediate reports of casualties.
  - Palestinian man, Karam Ali Ahmad Salman, 18, is shot dead by a group of Israeli civilians near the settlement of Kedumim, in the West Bank. In a separate incident, a Palestinian civilian home is set on fire by settlers. The occupants were not there at the time of the attack.

=== February ===
- 2 February – Israel and Sudan announce the finalisation of a deal to normalize relations between the two countries.
- 6 February – Five Izz ad-Din al-Qassam Brigades members are killed, three others are injured, and eight members are arrested during a raid by Israeli soldiers and subsequent gunbattle at the Aqabat Jabr refugee camp near Jericho in the West Bank.
- 10 February – Three Israelis, two brothers aged six and eight years old and a 20-year-old man, are killed in a car-ramming attack in Ramot, Jerusalem.
- 15 February – An investigation by a consortium of journalists uncovers a major disinformation campaign by an Israeli firm named Team Jorge, led by ex-Israeli special forces member Tal Hanan, which is alleged to have influenced more than 30 elections in several countries.
- 18 February – Five people are killed and fifteen others are injured by an Israeli airstrike on Kafr Sousa, Damascus Governorate, according to Syrian media.
- 22 February – Eleven Palestinians are killed and 102 more injured when Israeli troops storm Nablus, in the West Bank.
- 23 February – Oman opens its airspace to Israeli airlines for the first time. Israeli Foreign Minister Eli Cohen calls the decision historic.
- 26 February – Two Israeli settlers are killed by a Palestinian gunman in Huwara, Nablus Governorate, West Bank. During revenge attacks by Israelis, a Palestinian is shot and killed and 98 others are injured, many during arson attacks.
- 28 February – An Israeli-American man is killed in a drive-by shooting on a highway in Jericho, in the West Bank.

=== March ===
- 1 March – A bill supported by Itamar Ben-Gvir and Jewish Power party for the death penalty for those who are charged with terrorism offences passes the Knesset in a preliminary vote of 55–9.
- 2 March – Israeli State Department criticizes the government of Brazil for allowing two Iranian warships to dock in Rio de Janeiro and urges Brazil to send the warships away calling it a "dangerous and regretful development".
- 6 March – Five Palestinians are injured by Israeli settlers attacking a family on a street in Huwara, in the West Bank. Twenty-five Palestinians are injured by tear gas fired by Israeli soldiers during the attack.
- 7 March –
  - Israeli warplanes strike Syria's Aleppo International Airport with air-to-surface missiles, damaging the runway and putting the airport out of service. The Syrian transport ministry says that the delivery of humanitarian aid to Idlib will be rerouted to Latakia International Airport following the strike.
  - At least six members of the Palestinian militant group Jenin Brigades are killed by Israeli soldiers during a raid in Jenin, West Bank. Among those killed is the killer of two Israeli settlers last month.
- 9 March –
  - Three Palestinian Islamic Jihad members are killed by Israeli special units during an operation in Jenin, West Bank.
  - Three people are wounded by a shooting on Dizengoff Street, in Tel Aviv. The perpetrator is killed by police.
- 10 March – A Palestinian man is shot dead by an Israeli settler near a farm in Karnei Shomron, in the West Bank. The IDF claims that the Palestinian man was armed at the time.
- 12 March –
  - Israeli airstrikes at a weapons depot in Masyaf, Hama Governorate, Syria, kill a Syrian soldier and two pro-Iranian militants.
  - Israeli soldiers kill three Palestinian gunmen near Nablus, West Bank, after coming under fire.
- 13 March – An IED injures an Arab-Israeli man, 21, at the Megiddo Junction in the Jezreel Valley. The attack is believed to have been organized by Redwan Force senior commander, Ibrahim Aqil, (killed in an airstrike in Dahiya on September 20, 2024), and the perpetrator is believed to be Palestinian terrorist Hassan bin Jermi from Burj el-Shamali (near Tyre, Lebanon), recruited by Ali Muhammad al-Debs (killed in an airstrike on Nabatiyeh on February 14, 2024).
- 15 March – Palestinian Hassan bin Jermi, accused of being the perpetrator of the IED attack at the Megiddo Junction which injured a civilian two days ago is shot and killed in Shlomi by Israeli soldiers. Jermi is believed to have crossed illegally into northern Israel from Lebanon.
- 16 March – Two militants including Islamic Jihad and Hamas commanders and two civilians are killed and five others are injured during a raid by Israeli security forces in the Jenin refugee camp, in the West Bank.
- 17 March – The Jerusalem Marathon takes place; Kenyan runners Noah Kigen Kiprotich and Margaret Njuguna win the men's and women's events respectively.
- 26 March – Israeli Prime Minister Benjamin Netanyahu dismisses Defense Minister Yoav Gallant after Gallant calls on the government to pause discussions on the controversial judicial reform bill following widespread public protests against the reform.
- 27 March – Prime minister Benjamin Netanyahu announces a pause on his government's controversial judicial reform bill until April 30, the opening of the Knesset's summer session.
- 28 March – Israel successfully launches the Ofek-13 observation satellite into space on a Shavit 2 satellite launcher.
- 29 March – FIFA strips Indonesia of hosting this year's FIFA U-20 World Cup tournament after the Governor of Bali I Wayan Koster refused to host the Israel national under-19 football team.

=== April ===
- 3 April – A Lions' Den militant and a Fatah member are killed during a raid by Israeli soldiers in Nablus, in the occupied West Bank. Two other Palestinians are arrested and dozens more are hospitalized due to tear gas.
- 4 April – The Israeli Air Force launches airstrikes near Damascus, killing two civilians, according to Syrian state media. The Syrian Observatory for Human Rights says that an "unknown number" of Iran-backed militants were also killed in the strikes, which targeted a counter-battery radar in As-Suwayda Governorate, and a glass factory in al-Kiswah, Rif Dimashq Governorate.
- 5 April – Seven Palestinians injured by Israeli police storming the Al-Aqsa Mosque in Jerusalem in response to rioting, injuring seven Palestinians and resulting in clashes in the West Bank and in Gaza, where nine rockets were launched.
- 6 April – Three Israeli civilians injured by four Hezbollah rockets, which fired off at least 34 rockets in northern Israel with 25 rockets intercepted by the Iron Dome, with a Palestinian child injured by IDF shelling of two Lebanese villages and the Gaza Strip.
- 7 April –
  - An Italian tourist is killed and six Britons and Italians are injured in a vehicle-ramming attack in Tel Aviv, Israel. The perpetrator is shot dead by police.
  - Three British Israelis; mother Lucy and daughters Maia and Rina Dee are killed in a drive-by shooting near the Hamra settlement in the West Bank.
- 9 April –
  - Israel launches retaliatory airstrikes on Syrian territory after several rockets were launched toward the Israeli-occupied Syrian Golan Heights.
- 10 April – A 15-year-old Palestinian boy is killed by Israeli soldiers in Jericho, in the occupied West Bank.
- 11 April –
  - A Palestinian National Security Forces member and another Palestinian man are killed by Israeli soldiers in Elon Moreh, West Bank.
  - Israeli prime minister Benjamin Netanyahu announces that Jews will be prohibited from visiting the Temple Mount for the remainder of Ramadan, following raids by Israeli forces on the al-Aqsa Mosque last week. National security minister Itamar Ben-Gvir condemns the decision.
- 23 April – Jordanian MP Imad Al-Adwan is arrested by Israeli police and is accused of smuggling gold and weapons into the West Bank.
- 24 April – Five people are injured when a 39-year-old Palestinian terrorist rams his car into a crowd of people on a street in Jerusalem. He is later killed by an armed citizen.
- 29 April – Israeli Air Force launches airstrikes against targets near the Syrian city of Homs in a pre-dawn raid. Syrian state media reports that three civilians were injured in the attacks.

=== May ===
- 1 May – A 17-year-old Palestinian boy is killed during an Israeli raid near Jericho in the West Bank.
- 2 May – Former Palestinian Islamic Jihad spokesman Khader Adnan dies in an Israeli prison after a three-month hunger strike.
- 5 May – Israeli security units kill three Palestinian men in Nablus, West Bank, suspected of perpetrating the fatal shooting attack of British mother Lucy and her two daughters Maia and Rina Dee from Efrat in Hamra, Bik'at HaYarden, Jordan Valley on April 7.
- 6 May – Two Palestinian men, members of the Tul Karm Battalion, are killed during a raid by the Israel Defense Forces in Tulkarm in the West Bank.
- 9 May – The Israeli Air Force begins "Operation Shield and Arrow", launching multiple airstrikes in the Gaza Strip and killing three senior Islamic Jihad Movement leaders and at least ten civilians, including four children.
- 10 May – Palestinian militants fire more than 260 rockets into Israel from Gaza in response to yesterday's airstrikes. Most of the rockets are intercepted by the Iron Dome.
- 11 May – An Israeli airstrike on the Gaza Strip kills two commanders of Islamic Jihad. Additionally, the total death toll from the Israeli airstrikes in Gaza over the past two days increases to 26. A rocket is also launched from Gaza to Rehovot, killing one person and injuring five others.
- 12 May – An Israeli airstrike on a multi-story building in Gaza City, kills two people, including a commander of Islamic Jihad. Rockets are also fired by Palestinian militant groups in the Gaza Strip, striking the West Bank near Jerusalem for the first time. The death toll from Israeli airstrikes on Gaza increases to 31 as Egypt mediates for a ceasefire between the two sides.
- 13 May –
  - Israel airstrikes on the Gaza Strip entirely destroys two neighborhoods. Meanwhile, a Palestinian worker is killed and another is injured by rocket shrapnel in the Negev.
  - Palestinian Islamic Jihad spokesman Dawoud Shehab announces that the group accepted a ceasefire agreement mediated by Egypt, while the IDF says they will tentatively support it.
  - Israeli soldiers storm the Balata refugee camp in Nablus, West Bank, killing two people and injuring three others.
- 22 May – Israeli security forces kill three Al Aqsa Martyrs Brigades terrorists and injure six others during a raid in Nablus.
- 30 May – An Israeli settler is shot and killed near Hermesh, West Bank by Al Aqsa Martyrs Brigade gunmen.
- 31 May – Five members of the Popular Front for the Liberation of Palestine – General Command are killed and ten others are injured in an explosion at a base in Qusaya, Beqaa Governorate, Lebanon. The PFLP accuses the Israel Defense Forces of responsibility.

=== June ===
- 2 June – A heat wave across the country, with temperatures ranging between 35 °C (95 °F) in Jerusalem and 45 °C (113 °F) in the Jordan Valley, along with high winds, cause hundreds of wildfires, forcing roads to be closed and some buildings to be evacuated as well as rolling electricity outages; firefighters act quickly to control the brushfires, limiting property damage.
- 3 June – Three Israeli soldiers and an Egyptian policeman are killed in an exchange of fire near the Egyptian-Israeli border. It is the first fatal incident between the two countries in more than a decade.
- 19 June – Six Palestinians are killed, (Amjad Aref al-Jaas, 48, is the sixth) and 90 others are injured during an IDF raid in the Jenin refugee camp in the occupied West Bank. (Al Jazeera)
- 20 June – Hamas gunmen kill four Israelis and injure four others in a mass shooting at a restaurant and a Sonol petrol station near the Israeli settlement of Eli in the occupied West Bank. The two gunmen are killed by a civilian and a soldier.
- 21 June –
  - A Palestinian man is killed and several others are injured by Israeli settlers in Turmus Ayya.
  - An Israeli drone conducts the first airstrike on the West Bank since 2005, targeting a car, and killing two PIJ members and an Al-Aqsa Martyrs' Brigades member.
  - Morocco cancels this year's Negev Summit meeting in response to Israel approving the construction of over 4,500 settlements in the occupied West Bank on Sunday.
- 24 June – A Palestinian teenager is shot and killed at a checkpoint in Qalandiya after opening fire on Israeli security forces.
- 25 June – Two men, aged 61 and 71, are shot injured in their vehicle "due to a feud between criminal elements" in Nahf, Northern Israel. Both men later died at Galilee Medical Center in Nahariya.

=== July ===
- 3 July – Eight Palestinians are killed and more than 50 others are injured when Israeli soldiers storm the Jenin refugee camp in the occupied West Bank. The Israeli Air Force also launches airstrikes during the night.
- 4 July – The Israeli military's assault on Jenin in the West Bank, continues for a second day, killing four more Palestinians and bringing the death toll to 12, with more than 120 others injured.
- 5 July – Demonstrations in solidarity with Tel Aviv police chief Amichai Eshed. Large crowds block Tel Aviv's main highway and roads in other cities after Amichai Eshed announced his resignation.
- 7 July – IDF soldiers shoot dead two PFLP militants during a raid at a house in Nablus in the occupied West Bank.
- 12 July – Three Hezbollah members are injured by Israeli strikes near the Blue Line with the Israel Defense Forces accusing Hezbollah of attempting to destroy the border barrier.
- 15 July – IDF fires warning shots and uses riot dispersal implements on 18 people entailing journalists and parliamentarian member Qassem Hashem, a member of the Lebanese Arab Socialist Ba'ath Party that crossed the Lebanese border walking 80 meters into Israeli-occupied Shebaa Farms/Mount Dov region and walking up to Israel's border barrier, according to Ali Shoeib, a Hezbollah-affiliated correspondent.
- 17 July – Israel recognizes Morocco's sovereignty over Western Sahara.
- 20 July – A logistics officer for the IDF was crushed to death by a falling container in a work accident at the Tze'elim training facility.
- 23 July – A deal to sell a controlling interest in the Israeli financial firm Phoenix Group to a consortium led by an Abu Dhabi state holding company is federally averted.
- 24 July – The Knesset votes 64–0, with the 56-member opposition boycotting, to approve a law that prevents the Supreme Court from overturning government decisions on the basis of "reasonableness."
- 30 July – The Knesset passes an amendment to penal law adding sexual offenses to those offenses whose penalty can be doubled if done on grounds of "nationalistic terrorism, racism or hostility towards a certain community".

=== August ===
- 1 August – A Palestinian man, Mohannad al-Mazraa, 20, is shot and killed by Israeli security forces after opening fire on Israelis in the settlement of Ma'ale Adumim in the West Bank.
- 4 August – Israeli settlers storm the Palestinian village of Burqa, Ramallah, killing a Qusai Matan, 19, hours after Israeli soldiers killed another man, Mahmoud Abu Sa'an, 18, in Tulkarm.
- 5 August – A Palestinian gunman, Kamel Abu Bakr, 27 of Jenin, opens fire on a street in Tel Aviv, Israel, killing a policeman, before being shot dead by another officer.
- 6 August – IDF soldiers open fire against a vehicle in Jenin in the occupied West Bank, killing three people.
- 15 August – Two Palestinians combatants, including a 16-year old, are killed during a raid by Israeli soldiers in Jericho, in the occupied West Bank.
- 17 August – Israeli Security Cabinet receives permission from the United States to sell its Arrow 3 missile defense system to Germany, according to the Israeli Defence Ministry.
- 18 August – The Red Line opens for service in the Tel Aviv metropolitan area.
- 19 August – Two Israelis, a father and son, Shay Silas Nigreker, 60, and Aviad Nir, 28 from Ashdod are killed in an attack in Huwara in the occupied West Bank. The Israel Defense Forces launches a manhunt for the assailant and closes off roads in the area.
- 21 August –
  - The United Nations Middle East envoy says the conflict has killed over 200 Palestinians and nearly 30 Israelis this year, surpassing the previous year.
  - A Palestinian man opens fire on Israeli settlers driving in Hebron in the occupied West Bank, killing a woman and injuring a man.
- 22 August – More than 200 fishermen stage a protest on the docks of Gaza's seaport after the arrest of at least six fishermen and the seizure of multiple boats by Israeli forces, requesting immediate international intervention.
- 24 August –
  - One person is killed and eight others are injured by rockfalls in the Ein Gedi nature reserve in Israel.
  - The County Court of Victoria in Australia sentences Malka Leifer, the principal of a Jewish religious school in Melbourne, to 15 years in prison for the sexual assault of two sisters.
- 27 August – Libyan Prime Minister Abdul Hamid Dbeibeh suspends Foreign Minister Najla El Mangoush for administrative investigation following reports of an unauthorized meeting with Israeli Foreign Minister Eli Cohen.
- 29 August – Prime Minister James Marape announces that his country will open its Israeli embassy in Jerusalem.
- 31 August – An IDF soldier is killed and two others injured during a truck-ramming attack at a checkpoint in Beit Sira, in the occupied West Bank. The Palestinian truck driver, 41, is shot dead.

=== September ===
- 1 September – A Palestinian man is killed and several others are injured, a building is destroyed and ambulances are obstructed and shot at, during a raid by Israeli soldiers in Aqabah, in the occupied West Bank.
- 2 September – Clashes occur between police and Eritrean asylum seekers, including supporters and opponents of the government of Isaias Afwerki in Tel Aviv, Israel, resulting in 84 demonstrators and 30 police officers injured, with 68 arrested.
- 13 September – Five people are killed and 25 more injured during an explosion at a rally in the Gaza Strip marking the anniversary of Israel's withdrawal from the Gaza Strip in 2005.
- 19 September – Four Palestinians are killed and 30 others are injured in an Israeli Army raid in the Jenin refugee camp in the occupied West Bank. Two other Palestinians were also killed both in Jericho and Khan Yunis that afternoon.
- 23 September – UNIFIL intervenes to prevent a confrontation between the Lebanese Army and the Israeli Army near the Shebaa Farms.
- 24 September – Two Palestinians are killed when Israeli soldiers storm a refugee camp in Tulkarem, in the occupied West Bank.
- 27 September – Five people, all members of the same Arab family, are shot dead in Basmat Tab'un, Israel.

=== October ===
- 7 October – Hamas Al-Qassam Brigades launches over 3,500 rockets towards Israel and Nukhba commandoes infiltrates the Southern District, killing 1,180 entailing 797 civilians, 379 security forces, injuring 3,400 civilians and soldiers with 251 civilians and soldiers taken captive (65 later confirmed dead), with main targets of the Nova music festival (360 killed), Be'eri (132 killed), Kfar Aza (60-80 killed), the Re'im and Sderot police station (30 killed), Alumim (22 killed), Netiv HaAsara (22 killed). Israel retaliates with strikes on the Gaza Strip.
  - Battle of Re'im:
    - Hamas briefly seizes control of the IDF's 143rd "Gaza" Division headquarters in Re'im, Eshkol Regional Council, before Israeli troops retake it. Several Israeli soldiers are reportedly captured and taken to the Gaza Strip.
  - Battle of Sderot:
    - At least twenty Israeli police officers are killed by Hamas inside the police headquarters of Sderot after the building is seized.
  - Fighting and hostage taking in Be'eri and Ofakim
    - Hamas forces enter the Southern Israeli towns of Be'eri and Ofakim with heavy fighting underway.
  - Hamas leader Mohammed Deif announces the start of Operation Al-Aqsa Flood. Israel declares a state of war in response and orders Palestinians to leave the Gaza Strip.
  - Dozens of Israeli civilians are also taken hostage and taken to the Gaza Strip.
- 8 October –
  - Israel's Security Cabinet says it has approved a military operation against Hamas and Palestinian Islamic Jihad in the Gaza Strip.
  - 2023 Israel–Lebanon border clashes:
    - Hezbollah in southern Lebanon open fire at Israeli positions in Shebaa Farms with artillery and guided rockets. Israel responds with airstrikes on Hezbollah artillery positions.
  - Battle of Sderot:
    - Hamas forces and the IDF clash for a second day in Sderot.
  - Re'im music festival massacre:
    - More than 260 bodies are found in Re'im, Southern Israel, after Hamas attacked a trance music festival. Foreign nationals are among those massacred.
  - Israeli ambassador to the United States Michael Herzog says that Americans have been taken hostage by Hamas in Gaza.
- 9 October –
  - The UN Security Council meets in an emergency session but fail to achieve the unanimity needed for a joint statement.
  - Israeli air attacks and shelling aimed at houses and apartment buildings displace at least 123,538 Palestinians in Gaza, according to the UN Office for Humanitarian Affairs.
  - A member of Hezbollah is killed during an airstrike by Israel in Ayta ash Shab, Lebanon, while two others are killed during a shootout at the border with Israel.
- 10 October –
  - The death toll from the Israeli airstrikes in the Gaza Strip increases to 770 people, with more than 4,000 wounded. At least another 18 people were killed and 100 injured in the West Bank. The Israeli death toll passes 1,000.
  - Israeli airstrikes on Gaza hit residential buildings, large tower blocks, as well as schools and UN buildings, resulting in civilian casualties. The UN High Commissioner for Human Rights condemns the actions, saying they are in violation of international law.
  - Israeli airstrikes destroy a Palestinian Telecommunications Company building in Gaza city, causing widespread outage of communications and internet.
  - An Israeli soldier and two Palestinian Islamic Jihad terrorists are killed in clashes on the border with Lebanon.
  - An Israeli airstrike kills Jawad Abu Shammala and Zakaria Abu Maamar, two members in Hamas political office.
  - Aftermath of the Kfar Aza massacre revealed.
  - The World Health Organization calls for a humanitarian corridor into Gaza, after thirteen health facilities are hit in Israeli attacks.
  - Israeli airstrikes hit near the Rafah crossing between Gaza and Egypt, after an Israeli official advised Palestinians to leave the Gaza Strip through the border crossing.
- 11 October –
  - Prime Minister Benjamin Netanyahu and opposition leader Benny Gantz agree to form an emergency government during the war.
  - The Palestine Liberation Organization says Israel refused a request to bring food and medical supplies into the Gaza Strip. Israel also threatens a humanitarian convoy from Egypt carrying medical supplies into Gaza with an air strike.
  - Israeli air strikes destroy the Al-Fakhoora House of the Education Above All Foundation in Gaza. Israeli airstrikes have also hit the Islamic University of Gaza.
  - Dozens of Israeli fighter jets carry out more than 200 airstrikes overnight on the Al-Furqan neighborhood in Gaza City.
  - Israeli airstrikes destroy more than 22,600 residential units, 10 health facilities and damage 48 schools. At least 260 children have been killed by Israeli attacks on Gaza.
  - The UN Palestine Agency says Israeli airstrikes have killed nine of its staff in Gaza.
  - At least 30 people are killed in an Israeli air strike on a law expert's house when he was visiting his family in central Gaza City.
  - The Rimal and al-Karama neighbourhoods are destroyed by Israeli airstrikes, with eight 12-storey towers destroyed.
  - At least 16 Palestinians are killed in an Israeli air raid on the southern city of Khan Younis.
  - At least three Palestinians are killed and nine wounded by Israeli soldiers in the Qusra, south of Nablus in the West Bank.
  - The Palestinian Red Crescent says four of its paramedics have been killed in Israeli air attacks.
  - At least 1,055 Palestinians have been killed in Israel's air attacks and 5,184 wounded. At least 1,300 people in Israel have been killed and 2,800 wounded, according to the Israeli army.
- 12 October –
  - The death toll in Gaza rises to 1,200, while the number of injuries reaches about 5,600. The death toll in Israel reaches 1,400.
  - At least 51 people are killed and 281 injured in Israeli air strikes on several areas of Gaza, including Al Zaytoun, Al Nafaq, Sabra, Tal Al Hawa and Khan Younis.
  - Three of five water plants in Gaza are out of service due to the Israeli bombings and lack of fuel, according to the International Committee of Red Cross.
  - The United Nations says that 338,934 Palestinians have been displaced in Gaza, as Israel continues to conduct bombing raids.
  - United Nations secretary-general António Guterres says life-saving supplies, including food, fuel and water, must be allowed into Gaza.
  - Human Rights Watch accuses the IDF of using white phosphorus munitions in its military operation in the Gaza area and Lebanon, saying it violates international humanitarian law and puts civilians at risk of serious and long-term injuries.
  - Israeli Energy Minister Israel Katz says the blockade of Gaza will not end until all Israeli hostages are released by Hamas.
  - The Norwegian Refugee Council calls for humanitarian corridors to be established to allow the safe passage of personnel and relief supplies into Gaza.
  - The Ministry of Foreign Affairs of Egypt denies rumors that the Rafah Border Crossing was closed, asserting that the crossing remains operational and has not been closed since the onset of the crisis, and calls upon the international community willing to offer humanitarian aid to the Palestinians to route their aid to El Arish International Airport.
- 13 October –
  - The Israel Defense Forces notifies the United Nations that all the 1.1 million Palestinians living north of Wadi Gaza in the Gaza Strip have been ordered to relocate to Southern Gaza within 24 hours, ahead of an expected ground invasion. U.N. spokesperson Stephane Dujarric states it would be "impossible" for Gazans to obey this order without "devastating humanitarian consequences".
  - The Israeli Air Force begins dropping evacuation leaflets over Gaza City warning residents to leave the city immediately.
  - Hamas tells Palestinians to remain in their houses and not flee to Southern Gaza, following Israel's orders to do so.
  - The United Kingdom begins evacuating British citizens from Israel.
  - At a press conference, Israeli Defense Minister Yoav Gallant says the main goal of the coming military operation will be to "topple Hamas rule in Gaza".
  - Israeli soldiers open fire against protestors in the occupied West Bank, killing 11 people and injuring 124 more.
  - Hamas says that 13 hostages, including foreigners, have been killed in Israeli airstrikes.
  - Israeli troops conduct "localized raids" into Gaza in an attempt to locate Hamas-held hostages.
- 14 October –
  - 2023 attacks on Palestinians evacuating Gaza City:
    - 70 people are killed in attacks on convoys evacuating Gaza City.
  - 2023 Israel–Lebanon border clashes:
    - Hezbollah fires on five Israeli outposts in the Shebaa Farms with anti-tank missiles and mortar shells.
    - IDF shelling kills 2 civilians in the Shebaa village.
  - At least 27 Palestinians are killed by Israeli airstrikes in Jabaliya in the Gaza Strip.
  - The UN Office for the Coordination of Humanitarian Affairs says that more than 50,000 pregnant women and newborn babies in Gaza do not have access to essential medical care.
  - The UN Palestine agency says that its shelters in Gaza are no longer safe and also warns that there is a shortage of water in Gaza.
  - October 2023 Jenin incursion:
    - Israeli forces storm Jenin in the West Bank.
  - At least 15 hospitals are damaged by Israeli shelling and airstrikes, with two currently inoperable. 28 medical staff are killed and 23 ambulances are damaged or destroyed by Israeli airstrikes.
  - At least 2,268 Palestinians have been killed and 8,700 others injured in Israeli airstrikes on Gaza. At least 1,300 Israelis have been killed and at least 3,400 others are injured.
  - Amnesty International says that they have verified images of Israeli forces near Sderot using white phosphorus-based rounds.
  - Palestine's United Nations envoy says that Palestinians are in danger of mass ethnic cleansing.
  - The Israel Defense Forces announce that airstrikes in the Gaza Strip have killed Murad Abu Murad, the head of Hamas's air operations and Ali Qadi, a top Hamas commander, both of whom were involved in the October 7 invasion of Israel.
- 15 October –
  - 2023 Israel–Lebanon border clashes:
    - One person is killed and three others are injured in a cross-border attack by Hezbollah in Shtula. Israel retaliates with airstrikes on Hezbollah positions.
    - United Nations peacekeeping force UNIFIL says its headquarters in Naqoura, Lebanon, has been hit by a rocket.
  - An estimated one million Gazans have been displaced, according to the United Nations Palestinian agency, as aid groups describe the situation in the besieged enclave as "catastrophic".
  - Human Rights Watch confirms that Israel has used white phosphorus in Gaza and Lebanon.
  - Israel conducts military operations in Ramallah in the West Bank, arresting more than 50 people.
  - The Israel Defense Forces kill senior Hamas commander Billal Al Kedra in an airstrike in Khan Yunis.
  - Lawyers and human rights organisations in Israel receive dozens of complaints from Palestinian workers and students who have been suspended from schools, universities, and workplaces over social media posts or conversations with colleagues.
  - An interview with a rescued Israeli hostage, Yasmin Porat, airs on the Israeli radio program Haboker Hazeh, during which Porat states that she was treated "very humanely" by Hamas fighters and that Israeli security forces "eliminated everyone, including the hostages" during their recapture of Be'eri, sparking controversy.
- 16 October –
  - The World Health Organization said 21 hospitals in Gaza have been ordered to evacuate by Israel, warning this "may amount to a violation of international humanitarian law".
  - Israel begins evacuating 28 communities located within two kilometers of the border with Lebanon amid clashes with Hezbollah.
  - Hundreds of Americans and Israeli Americans are evacuated by sea from Haifa to Cyprus.
  - At least four hospitals in northern Gaza are no longer functioning following Israeli bombardments, according to the United Nations.
  - Palestinian protesters rally in the streets of several cities across the West Bank calling for an end to Israeli attacks on Gaza.
  - Hamas releases the first video of a hostage on Telegram since the war started, a 21-year-old Israeli woman from Shoham who was kidnapped during the Re'im music festival massacre. In the video, she claims to be receiving medical treatment by her captors.
  - Hamas forces launch a barrage of missiles at the two largest Israeli cities, Tel Aviv and Jerusalem, saying it was in response to Israel's "targeting of civilians".
  - Israeli military forces carry out raids and make dozens of arrests in multiple areas in the West Bank, including East Jerusalem, Nablus, Bethlehem, Hebron and the Aqabat Jabr camp in Jericho.
  - Several dozen raids are conducted by Israeli forces in the West Bank, detaining about 600 people. Most are held without charges under "administrative detention", where the individuals are not told the reasons for their arrest.
  - Colombia requests the departure of the Israeli ambassador following Colombian President Gustavo Petro's remarks criticizing Israel's actions. In response, Israel suspends security exports to the South American nation.
- 17 October –
  - Al-Ahli Arab Hospital explosion: Around 500 people are killed by an explosion at the Al-Ahli Arab Hospital in Gaza City. Hamas spokespersons blame an Israeli airstrike, while an IDF investigation shows explosion was caused by failed Hamas rocket launch.
  - Palestinian President Mahmoud Abbas declares three days of mourning in Palestinian territories following the hospital bombing.
  - October 2023 UNRWA school airstrike: An Israeli airstrike hits a United Nations school inside a refugee camp, killing six people.
  - The Israeli Ministry of Health says that 4,399 people in Israel have been wounded since the start of the war, of which 333 are still hospitalized.
- 18 October –
  - The United States vetoes a United Nations Security Council resolution that would have called for a humanitarian pause in Gaza. Twelve other countries voted in favour of the resolution while two abstained.
  - UN Under-Secretary-General Martin Griffiths reiterates that there are rules of war after the US vetoed humanitarian pauses in the conflict.
  - Turkish President Recep Tayyip Erdogan condemns the UNSC for failing to pass a resolution for a humanitarian pause, adding that efforts to deescalate the conflict have been hindered by the collective punishment of Palestinians through airstrikes and the deployment of US aircraft carriers to the region.
  - U.S. President Joe Biden visits Israel and meets with Prime Minister Benjamin Netanyahu.
- 19 October –
  - Dozens of rockets are fired at the northern Israeli cities of Nahariya and Kiryat Shmona from southern Lebanon, injuring at least three civilians. Hamas says its cells in Lebanon were responsible for the rocket attacks. Israel responds with airstrikes on Hezbollah positions.
  - Five Palestinians are killed in clashes with the Israeli military at the Nur Shams refugee camp in Tulkarm, West Bank.
  - A member of the Security Cabinet of Israel says that the Israel Defense Forces has been given the "green light" to enter the Gaza Strip.
  - UK Prime Minister Rishi Sunak visits Israel and meets with Prime Minister Benjamin Netanyahu, announcing the UK's solidarity with Israel in its war with Hamas.
  - Israel withdraws its ambassador Irit Lillian and other diplomats from Turkey after urging its citizens to avoid all travel to the country.
- 20 October –
  - Israel announces the total evacuation of Kiryat Shmona, a city of 20,000 near the border with Lebanon, amid rising tensions with the militant group Hezbollah.
  - Colombian President Gustavo Petro announces the establishment of an embassy to the State of Palestine in Ramallah, West Bank, and humanitarian aid to the Gaza Strip amidst the ongoing Gaza war.
- 21 October – The Rafah Border Crossing on the Egypt–Gaza border opens for the first time since the war began, allowing humanitarian aid trucks to enter Gaza.
- 22 October –
  - Palestinian journalist Rushdi Sarraj is killed in an Israeli attack on his home in Gaza.
  - At least 55 people are killed in overnight raids on the Gaza Strip by Israel.
  - An Israeli tank accidentally hits an Egyptian position near the border with Gaza. Several Egyptian border guards sustained injuries from fragments of a shell.
  - At least 300 Palestinians are placed under administrative detention or have had detention orders renewed, allowing Israel to hold them without charge indefinitely under secret evidence.
  - Israel launches airstrikes against the Damascus International Airport, killing two workers.
- 23 October –
  - Omar Daraghmeh, a senior Hamas official, dies while in Israeli prison, with Hamas spokespeople saying it was an assassination. He was arrested in the West Bank by the Israel Defense Forces, along with his son.
  - The Indonesian Hospital, the largest in northern Gaza, loses power after running out of fuel.
  - Hamas releases two Israeli hostages following mediation by Qatar and Egypt. The pair were taken to the Rafah border crossing between Gaza and Egypt.
  - Israeli airstrikes kill at least 436 Palestinians, including women and children, in northern Gaza's Al-Shati refugee camp as well as Khan Younis.
  - Israeli forces launch night raids in the West Bank, with heavily armed troops backed by armored vehicles seen in at least two areas.
  - Qatar's Emir Tamim Bin Hamad Al Thani has warned the escalation of fighting in Gaza poses a threat to the region and the world. He asserted Israel should not be given a "green light for unconditional killing".
  - Israeli air raids target several locations in Lebanon including Ramesh, Markaba, Houla, Shebaa, and Kafr Shuba.
- 24 October –
  - UN Secretary-General António Guterres calls for an immediate humanitarian ceasefire in Gaza, saying there are clear violations of international humanitarian law in Gaza. He also pushed for more humanitarian relief to be allowed into the enclave.
  - Human Rights Watch has criticized Israel for "deliberately deepening the suffering of civilians in Gaza" by refusing to allow fuel shipment into the enclave and to restore the flow of water.
  - Israeli police have closed the Al-Aqsa Mosque in East Jerusalem and stopped Muslim worshippers from entering the compound.
  - Israel launches airstrikes near the Red Crescent headquarters and Al-Amal Hospital in Khan Younis, where more than 4,000 displaced Palestinians are taking shelter.
  - UN Secretary-General António Guterres calls for an immediate humanitarian ceasefire in Gaza, saying that there are clear violations of international humanitarian law. Guterres also called for more humanitarian relief to be allowed into the enclave.
  - Human Rights Watch criticizes Israel for "deliberately deepening the suffering of civilians in Gaza" by refusing to allow shipments of fuel into the enclave and for not restoring the supply of water.
- 25 October –
  - The Gaza Health Ministry says that at least 704 people have died in the past day. The UN relief agency says this was "the highest fatality toll reported in a single day".
  - At least 16 people are killed and several others injured following Israeli airstrikes across Gaza residential areas in Jabalia, Tal al-Hawa, Khan Younis and the Nuseirat refugee camp.
  - At least 11 people are arrested in Hebron in the West Bank following an Israeli raid. Israeli troops stormed several villages including al-Burj and al-Majd.
  - The UN Security Council holds an open debate, with many of the nearly 90 countries on the speakers' list calling for a ceasefire amid the mounting death toll in Gaza.
  - Draft resolutions calling for a ceasefire are being considered by both the UN Security Council and the UN General Assembly.
  - Credit rating agency S&P says it is downgrading Israel's rating outlook to "negative" to reflect "the risk that the *Gaza war could spread more widely". Fitch Ratings also places a similar negative rating on Israel.
  - In a televised address to the nation, Israeli Prime Minister Benjamin Netanyahu says that he has set the date for a ground invasion of the Gaza Strip with the main goals of the operation being to destroy Hamas and to rescue hostages.
  - The Israeli Air Force launches airstrikes on "military infrastructure" of the Syrian Armed Forces in Daraa Governorate, killing eight Syrian soldiers and injuring seven others.
- 26 October –
  - An Israeli air raid kills the wife, son, daughter and infant grandson of Al Jazeera Arabic's Gaza bureau chief Wael Dahdouh in central Gaza after they evacuated to the area following warnings from Israel.
  - Oxfam says Israel is using starvation as a "weapon of war" as the blockade of Gaza continues.
  - The Israel and Palestine director at Human Rights Watch confirms the Palestinian death toll provided by the Health Ministry is reliable, after US President Joe Biden questioned the number of people killed.
  - Israel continues raids and arrests in the West Bank, where Palestinian authorities say more than 1,200 people have been detained.
  - In a joint statement, the foreign ministers of Bahrain, Egypt, Jordan, Kuwait, Morocco Oman, Qatar, Saudi Arabia and the United Arab Emirates condemned the forced displacement and collective punishment in Gaza.
  - Amnesty International issues a statement calling for an immediate ceasefire to stop the increasing death toll and ensure crucial aid reaches Gaza amid an "unprecedented humanitarian catastrophe".
  - The Israel and Palestine director at Human Rights Watch confirms the Palestinian death toll provided by the Health Ministry is reliable, after US President Joe Biden questioned the number of people killed.
  - The office of Florida Governor Ron DeSantis announces that it is sending drones and weapons to Israel to support it's fight against Hamas.
  - IDF tanks enter northern Gaza in a "targeted raid", saying it was in preparation for the "next stages of combat". No Israeli military casualties are reported.
- 27 October –
  - At least 33 Palestinians are killed and several wounded, following Israeli airstrikes on at least three residential neighbourhoods in Gaza City.
  - At least 10 Palestinians are killed, including journalist Yasser Abu Namous and his mother, in a series of airstrikes carried out by Israeli forces in southern Gaza.
  - A number of people are killed and injured in an Israeli airstrike on the Al-Shati refugee camp, destroying residential buildings and the nearby White Mosque.
  - The Palestinian Red Crescent has said that its medics were shot at by Israeli forces as they treated an injured person in Tubas, West Bank.
  - Four people are killed after a pre-dawn raid by Israeli forces in the West Bank. At least 19 people have been arrested.
  - The Israel Defense Forces enter the Gaza Strip from multiple directions with infantry and tanks crossing the border. Heavy clashes are reportedly underway.
  - Israeli troops advance on the city of Beit Hanoun.
- 28 October –
  - Thousands of Gazan workers employed in Israel go missing amid a campaign of mass arrests. Human rights groups and trade unions say they have been illegally detained in military facilities in the West Bank, following the revocation of their work permits.
  - An Israeli shell hits the headquarters of the United Nations Interim Force in Lebanon, the second such incident since war began.
  - UN agencies say they are unable to contact staff in Gaza amid the near-total communications blackout and call for civilians to be protected.
  - Human Rights Watch says that the near-total communication blackout "risks providing cover for mass atrocities and contributing to impunity for human rights violations" and will make it more difficult to "obtain critical information and evidence about human rights violations and war crimes being committed, and to hear directly from those experiencing the violations".
  - Israeli airstrikes destroy hundreds of buildings and damage thousands of others in the Gaza Strip overnight, the civil defense service in Gaza said.
  - Israeli warplanes bombed 150 underground targets in northern Gaza, including tunnels and underground infrastructure.
  - SpaceX chief Elon Musk announces that Starlink services will be offered in the Gaza Strip to "internationally recognized aid organizations".
  - The UN General Assembly passes a resolution with a vote of 120–14, with 45 abstentions, calling for an immediate humanitarian truce in Gaza, despite US and Israeli opposition.
  - The Egyptian foreign ministry has warned of the "humanitarian and security repercussions of the Israeli ground attack" on Gaza, saying "we hold the Israeli government responsible for violating the United Nations General Assembly resolution for an immediate ceasefire and implementing a humanitarian truce".
  - The International Organization for Migration has renewed its call for a ceasefire, saying "civilians must be protected. There are no winners in war. The most vulnerable pay the heaviest toll"
  - Turkish President Recep Tayyip Erdoğan has called on Israel to "immediately come out of its state of madness and stop its attacks" on the Gaza Strip, saying they have "targeted women, children and innocent civilians, deepening the humanitarian crisis".
  - Save the Children says children will "bear the brunt" of Israel's intensified attacks on the Gaza Strip, saying in the event of a full ground incursion, more than one million children's lives, nearly half of the 2.3 million population of Gaza, will be affected.
- 29 October –
  - Impeding the delivery of aid to Gaza's residents may be considered a crime within the jurisdiction of the International Criminal Court, its top prosecutor has said.
  - More children have been killed in Gaza during the war, than the total killed in conflicts around the world since 2019, Save the Children has said. At least 3,324 children have been killed in Gaza, while 36 have died in the West Bank.
  - Israel increases air attacks close to Al-Quds Hospital in Gaza City after ordering the Palestinian Red Crescent to immediately evacuate the hospital. The World Health Organization says that "it's impossible to evacuate hospitals full of patients without endangering their lives".
  - Waves of bombardments hit Al-Shati refugee camp, Shujaiya and Zeitoun in Gaza.
  - At least 8,005 Palestinians have been killed in Gaza since October 7. More than 1,400 people have been killed in Israel.
  - Israel's ambassador to the United Nations, Gilad Erdan, calls on countries to cease funding the body after the UN General Assembly passed a non-binding resolution calling for an immediate ceasefire in Gaza.
  - Israeli Prime Minister Benjamin Netanyahu says the war will be "long and difficult", with Israel intensifying its aerial raids and progressing to the "next phase" of operations.
  - The Legal Center for Arab Minority Rights in Israel demands that Israel's government cancel emergency regulations extending the period which detainees suspected of "security offences" can be denied access to a lawyer.
  - Reporters Without Borders says the killing of Reuters journalist Issam Abdallah in Lebanon earlier this month resulted from a deliberate strike from the direction of the Israeli border.
- 30 October –
  - Heavy clashes are reported as IDF tanks reach the outskirts of Gaza City.
  - Israeli troops block Salah al-Din Road, the main highway in the Gaza Strip.
  - Israel announces that its forces rescued an IDF private who was taken hostage by Hamas during an overnight operation involving its intelligence agency Shin Bet.
  - Israeli prime minister Benjamin Netanyahu dismisses calls for a ceasefire in the war with Hamas, stating that Israel will continue its military operations.
- 31 October –
  - Israel intercepts three surface-to-surface missiles launched from Yemen, with at least one missile being shot down by its Arrow missile defence system. The Iran-backed Houthis claim responsibility for the launches.
  - Jabalia refugee camp airstrikes: More than 50 people are killed and 150 more injured during an airstrike against the Jabalia refugee camp in the Gaza Strip, with the camp reported completely destroyed.
  - Gaza's Hamas-controlled health ministry reports Israeli airstrikes continue to target hospitals and medical centers, intentionally hitting medical institutions. Fifty-seven institutions have been hit, while thirty-two are out of service because of being targeted or lack of fuel.
  - An immediate humanitarian ceasefire is "absolutely imperative" in Gaza, said the UN human rights office, adding that "colleagues across the UN are talking about the need".
  - The Patriarchate of Jerusalem has blamed Israel for the bombing of its cultural centre, saying the attack "represents a stark embodiment of Israel's unwarranted determination to destroy the civil infrastructure and social service centres, as well as shelters for civilians".
  - The UN Children's Fund's executive director says that more than 420 children are being killed or injured in Gaza every day.
  - Israeli air raids target the vicinity of the European Hospital in southern Gaza. Meanwhile, the director of the Indonesia Hospital reported it was hit for the third time.
  - The Palestine Red Crescent Society reports continuous artillery and air strikes in the Tal al-Hawa in northern Gaza near al-Quds Hospital. The hospital currently shelters hundreds of patients and more than 12,000 displaced civilians.
  - The Palestinian Health Ministry says 8,525 Palestinians have been killed in Israeli air raids, including 3,542 children.
  - Israeli forces arrest 60 Palestinians in the West Bank, the Palestinian Prisoners Society said, adding that "arrests are accompanied with torture and abusive attacks, as well as collective punishment and destruction of property".
  - Australia expresses concern over growing attacks by residents of settlements against Palestinians in the occupied West Bank.
  - Jordanian Foreign Affairs Minister Ayman Safadi calls for an immediate stop to the "humanitarian catastrophe" in Gaza caused by Israeli bombardment and the implementation of international law, while stressing the necessity of humanitarian aid.
  - Amnesty International says they have found that "the Israeli army indiscriminately, and therefore unlawfully, used white phosphorus munitions in an attack on Dhayra, in south Lebanon which "must be investigated as a war crime".
  - Bolivia cut diplomatic relations with Israel.
  - The Governments of Chile and Colombia recall their respective ambassadors to Israel as a response to Israel's military actions in the Gaza Strip.

=== November ===
- 1 November –
  - Israel deploys Saar-class corvettes to the Red Sea in response to missile and drone attacks from Yemen. Israeli National Security Council official Tzachi Hanegbi says the Houthi attacks on Israel are "intolerable".
  - Jordan recalls its ambassador to condemn the war.
  - The Jabalia refugee camp in the Gaza Strip is hit by Israeli airstrike for the second consecutive day, with several more people being killed.
  - Iranian Foreign Affairs Minister Hossein Amir-Abdollahian warns of "harsh consequences" if Israel continues its invasion of the Gaza Strip.
  - An Israeli soldier is killed in a mortar attack near the kibbutz of Be'eri in southern Israel.
- 2 November –
  - The UN Human Rights Office says Israeli attacks on the refugee camp may be "disproportionate attacks that could amount to war crimes".
  - UNICEF and United Nations Secretary-General António Guterres has described attacks on the Jabalia refugee camp as "horrific and appalling".
  - UNICEF estimates that more than 3,500 children have been killed during the war, saying "children have endured too much already, the killing and captivity of children must stop".
  - At least 8,805 Palestinians have been killed in Gaza since October 7. In addition, more than 1,400 Israelis have been killed in Israel.
  - Israel's agricultural sector is suffering "significant damage" due to an exodus of thousands of foreign workers. More than a quarter of about 30,000 foreign workers have left the country and about 20,000 Palestinian agricultural workers have not been allowed to enter Israel.
  - At least 60 people were detained overnight across the West Bank. The total number of Palestinians detained since the war started exceeds 1,800. About half of them are being held in administrative detention.
  - Two Palestinians are killed and six wounded in Israeli raids in Qalqilya and Ramallah in the West Bank.
  - Hezbollah launches a suicide drone attack on an IDF barracks in Shebaa Farms.
  - Israeli troops and tanks continue to encircle Gaza City with heavy clashes reported on the city's outskirts. Hamas and Palestinian Islamic Jihad say they are using "hit-and-run attacks" from tunnels to halt the advance.
- 3 November –
  - Al-Shifa ambulance airstrike: Several people are killed and many more wounded during an Israeli airstrike against a convoy of ambulances carrying wounded people from the al-Shifa Hospital in the Gaza Strip to Rafah, Egypt.
  - At least 14 people are killed during an Israeli airstrike against civilians fleeing to southern Gaza.
  - Kyrgyzstan warns their citizens to not travel to fight against Israel.
  - The Government of Honduras recalls its ambassador to Israel as a response to Israel's military actions in the Gaza Strip.
- 4 November – Turkey recalls its ambassador to Israel in response to Israel's military actions in the Gaza Strip.
- 5 November –
  - The Israel Defense Forces announce the complete encirclement of Gaza City and say that they have split the Gaza Strip in two after Israeli troops reach the coast.
  - Three children and a woman are killed, and several others are injured, when two cars carrying civilians are hit by an Israeli airstrike near the towns of Ainata and Aitaroun, Lebanon, and four paramedics are injured when two ambulances are bombed in Tayr Harfa. In response to these attacks, Hezbollah launches an anti-tank guided missile towards Kiryat Shmona, killing a civilian. Three Hezbollah members are later killed in retaliation during a series of Israeli airstrikes.
  - In an interview with Radio Kol Berama during the Gaza war, Amihai Eliyahu claimed that the use of nuclear weapons was "one of the possibilities" when discussing Israel's options in its ongoing military action in the Gaza Strip. Prime Minister Benjamin Netanyahu disavowed his comments and announced his suspension from cabinet meetings. However, Eliyahu took part in a cabinet telephone vote later that day.
- 6 November –
  - An Israel Border Police officer, Israeli American Rose Lubin, is stabbed to death and another officer is wounded near the Old City of Jerusalem. Responding security forces shoot the Palestinian attacker dead.
  - South Africa recalls its ambassador to Israel in response to its invasion of the Gaza Strip, and accuses Israel of genocide in Gaza.
  - IDF spokesperson Daniel Hagari says fighter jets have struck a "broad range" of Hezbollah targets in Lebanon in response to a barrage of rockets fired at northern Israeli cities.
- 7 November –
  - At least eight people are killed and dozens wounded in Israeli attacks on the Nasser Medical Complex in Gaza City, which includes the Al-Nasser Children's hospital, suffering direct and indirect hits from Israeli missiles.
  - At least two Palestinians are killed and several others injured in separate Israeli air raids that hit the vicinity of Kamal Adwan Hospital in Beit Hanoun and Al-Quds Hospital in the Tal al-Hawa district of Gaza City.
  - Hundreds of pro-Palestinian demonstrators rally at the Port of Tacoma, in Washington state, to block a military supply vessel which will carry weapons from the United States to Israel.
  - Israel appoints former ambassador Alon Roth-Snir to coordinate efforts for the release of hostages held by Hamas in Gaza.
  - Trade between Turkey and Israel decreased by half since the start of the war, compared with the same period last year, according to the Turkish trade minister.
  - Israeli Defense Minister Yoav Gallant says that Israeli troops have entered Gaza City from multiple directions with heavy clashes occurring "deep inside" the city. Gallant also claims that Hamas leader Yahya Sinwar is trapped in a bunker in the city centre.
  - United Nations monitors say that only about 5,000 Palestinians have been evacuated from northern to southern Gaza on Monday, stating that "entire families, including children, elderly people and persons with disabilities" could only make the journey on foot as roads have been heavily damaged.
- 8 November –
  - Human Rights Watch says an Israeli airstrike on an ambulance outside Al-Shifa Hospital in Gaza should be investigated as a possible war crime, adding that it did not find evidence that the ambulance was being used for military purposes.
  - Gaza's Al-Shifa Hospital is hit with intense Israeli bombardment and flares. The hospital is housing tens of thousands of people sheltering from Israel's bombardment.
  - Sites near the Indonesia Hospital are hit with Israeli bombardment. Electricity at the hospital is expected to be cut off soon due to the short supply of fuel.
  - Israeli aircraft renew their bombardment of the Nuseirat refugee camp in central Gaza Strip, resulting in several deaths and injuries. A residence belonging to a local family is hit, with people still trapped under the rubble of the destroyed residential building.
  - Chad withdraws their ambassador from Israel, joining eight other countries that have done the same in recent weeks.
  - Amnesty International says Israel has dramatically increased its use of detention without charges since the start of the war, while also turning a blind eye to cases of torture and degrading treatment in prisons.
  - Al-Shifa ambulance airstrike: Human Rights Watch says an Israeli airstrike on an ambulance outside Al-Shifa Hospital in Gaza should be investigated as a possible war crime, adding that it did not find evidence that the ambulance was being used for military purposes.
  - At least 4,237 Palestinian children have been killed in Gaza since the start of the war. An additional 1,350 children are reported as missing and most are presumed dead under the rubble of destroyed buildings in Gaza.
  - Gaza's Al-Shifa Hospital is hit with intense Israeli bombardment and flares. The hospital is housing tens of thousands of people sheltering from Israel's bombardment.
  - Four people are killed in an airstrike on a house in the Jabalia refugee camp located in the northernmost part of the Gaza Strip.
- 9 November –
  - At least 30 Palestinians are killed in Israeli bombardments overnight in the Jabalia refugee camp in north and Sabra in western Gaza.
  - Three human rights organisations, Al Haq, Al Mezan and the Palestinian Centre for Human Rights, have filed a lawsuit with the International Criminal Court calling for it to consider apartheid and genocide in its investigation of the situation in Palestine.
  - The heads of the UNRWA and the World Health Organization say that conditions at Al-Shifa hospital, Gaza's largest hospital, were "disastrous" with emergency rooms overflowing with the sick and wounded.
  - The Indonesia Hospital in northern Gaza records at least 65 deaths and over 100 injuries from ongoing Israeli bombardment.
  - At least three people are killed and dozens of others injured after an Israeli air strike hit the vicinity of Al-Nasr Hospital in western Gaza.
  - At least four people are killed and dozens others wounded from Israeli artillery fire and shelling in the southern Gaza Strip.
  - Two Israeli settlers are shot near the West Bank settlement of Itamar. Both are evacuated to Tel Aviv, where one remains in critical condition.
  - Mohammad Barakeh, the head of the High Follow-Up Committee for Arab Citizens of Israel, has been arrested by Israeli forces in Nazareth for planning a protest against the war.
  - Israeli forces use bulldozers to destroy streets in Jenin in the West Bank, supported by helicopters and reconnaissance aircraft, following a firefight in the city, killing eight Palestinians.
  - An unidentified drone strikes a building in the port city of Eilat, after Israel intercepts a ballistic missile over the Red Sea with its Arrow missile defense system. The Yemen-based Houthis claim responsibility, but Israel's military blames an unspecified organization in Syria for the strike.
- 10 November –
  - A video is released showing a Palestinian prisoner being used as a human shield during the Israeli operation in the West Bank. The prisoner is handcuffed, blindfolded and kneeling on a street, as an Israeli soldier takes cover behind him, while aiming his rifle.
  - The UN human rights commissioner urged an investigation into Israel's use of "high-impact explosive weapons" in Gaza, which was causing indiscriminate destruction in the enclave and must "end its use of such weapons".
  - Six people are killed following an Israeli airstrike on the Al-Shifa Hospital. Human Rights Watch comments "hospitals must always be protected" and "no area is a free-fire zone", urging world leaders to act "to prevent further mass atrocities".
  - The Palestinian Red Crescent says Israeli forces bomb the Tal al-Hawa area of Gaza near Al-Quds Hospital.
  - The vicinity of Gaza's Patient's Friends Hospital is hit by an Israeli airstrike. Another Israeli strike is reported near Al-Awda Hospital in the Tal al-Zaatar area, resulting in damage to an ambulance.
  - The director of Gaza's Al-Rantisi Children's Hospital says that an Israeli airstrike has hit the medical facility, causing a fire.
  - Nearly 80 Palestinians are detained by Israeli forces from across the West Bank in overnight raids, many from Al-Arroub refugee camp north of Hebron; others were detained from Bethlehem, Nablus, Ramallah, and Jericho.
  - Israeli Prime Minister Benjamin Netanyahu says that the Israel Defense Forces will control the Gaza Strip after the war ends, rejecting calls for an international peacekeeping force to be stationed there.
- 11 November –
  - The director of the Al-Shifa Hospital in Gaza City says that the medical complex is "completely cut off", with any "moving person targeted" by Israeli forces. Médecins Sans Frontières confirms reports that people are being shot at as they try to exit the hospital. Palestinian health minister Mai al-Kaila says that Israeli forces have also shelled the hospital with white phosphorus munitions which are banned under international law.
  - Israeli tanks and snipers fire at the Al-Quds Hospital in Gaza City from within twenty meters, where around 14,000 displaced people are sheltering in a state of "extreme panic and fear", according to the Palestinian Red Crescent.
  - The UN Humanitarian Affairs Office reports that at least 45 Palestinians have been displaced in the West Bank following Israeli punitive demolitions.
  - Digital rights organization Access Now says that shutdowns affecting internet access in the Gaza Strip are providing "cover for human rights atrocities", which are being worsened by Israel's control over internet access.
  - The Norwegian Refugee Council condemns Israeli attacks on Gaza hospitals, calling for an urgent ceasefire and for the protection of medical staff, saying that "it is an affront to wage war around and on hospitals".
  - The United Nations Office for the Coordination of Humanitarian Affairs says that the transfer of solid waste to landfills has stopped across the Gaza Strip because of insecurity and a shortage of fuel. The World Health Organization reports that the spread of infectious diseases including diarrhea and chickenpox are increasing rapidly, with medical organizations warning of the risk of a possible cholera epidemic.
  - HonestReporting, an Israel-based media watchdog, admits that the group had no evidence to back up their claims that some journalists were accomplices in the 2023 Hamas attack on Israel.
- 12 November –
  - South African Foreign Minister Naledi Pandor urges the International Criminal Court to issue an arrest warrant for Israeli prime minister Benjamin Netanyahu, calling on the prosecutor to investigate war crimes, crimes against humanity, and genocide.
  - The UN Development Programme office in Gaza is shelled, with reports of a significant number of deaths and injuries. Office chief Achim Steiner says that "civilians, civilian infrastructure and the inviolability of UN facilities must be always protected".
  - The United Nations says that several hospitals in Gaza have been directly hit, and that "hospitals are explicitly entitled to specific protection under international humanitarian law", as Israel intensifies its shelling and ground attacks around hospitals in Gaza City and northern Gaza.
- 13 November –
  - Gaza's two largest hospitals, Al-Shifa Hospital and Al-Quds Hospital, both suspend operations. Israeli snipers continue to fire at anyone near the Al-Shifa Hospital, trapping thousands of people inside.
  - Israeli troops of the Golani Brigade seize control of the Palestinian Legislative Council building in Gaza City, which has been used by Hamas lawmakers since 2007.
  - Israel bombs the Al-Salam Mosque in Sabra, increasing the total number of mosques destroyed by Israeli forces to more than 60.
  - United Nations compounds around the world lower the UN flag to half-mast to honor the 101 UN workers who have been killed by Israeli attacks.
  - The UN agency for Palestinian refugees says that the Israeli Navy damaged one of its guesthouses in Rafah, despite having shared coordinates with Israel multiple times.
  - Director of the UN agency for Palestinian refugees Thomas White says that humanitarian operations in Gaza will be suspended within the next 48 hours due to a shortage of fuel.
  - World Health Organization Director-General Tedros Adhanoms warns of a "dire and perilous" situation in Gaza's hospitals, saying that more patients, including premature babies, are dying.
  - The Palestinian Central Bureau of Statistics says that 3,117 students enrolled in schools in Gaza have been killed by Israel, while 4,613 have been injured. A further 130 teachers and school administrators are also killed. Twenty-four students have been killed in the West Bank.
- 14 November –
  - Israeli Prime Minister Benjamin Netanyahu says that "the IDF have completed the encirclement of Gaza City". Defense Minister Yoav Gallant also says that Hamas has "lost control" of Gaza City as Israeli troops capture the city's municipal buildings.
  - The IDF intercepts a surface-to-surface missile launched from Yemen over the Red Sea.
  - Seven Palestinians are killed in an Israeli raid in Tulkarm in the occupied West Bank.
- 15 November –
  - The Israel Defense Forces enter the Al-Shifa Hospital complex in Gaza City with infantry and tanks.
  - The UN Security Council passes a resolution calling for humanitarian pauses in the conflict, the establishment of humanitarian corridors, and for the unconditional release of hostages taken by Hamas. Russia, the United Kingdom, and the United States abstained.
- 16 November –
  - Israel Police kill three gunmen who attacked a checkpoint near Jerusalem, injuring six security forces.
  - The Israel Defense Forces surround the Al-Ahli Arab Hospital in Gaza City with tanks.
- 17 November –
  - An Israeli airstrike kills Ahmad Bahar, a senior leader in Hamas who served as the vice president of the Palestinian Legislative Council.
  - Israel calls on civilians to evacuate Khan Yunis in the south of Gaza and head to field hospitals, saying that Israeli troops will be carrying out a military operation in the area.
- 19 November –
  - The Houthi movement hijacks a British cargo ship operated by a Japanese company and partially owned by an Israeli businessman in the Red Sea. 25 people are on board from different nationalities, including Ukrainians, Bulgarians, Filipinos, and Mexicans.
  - On the group's Telegram channel, Houthi spokesman Yahya Sarea declares their intention to target ships owned or operated by Israeli companies, or carrying the Israeli flag.
- 20 November – Israel recalls its ambassador from South Africa after Minister in the Presidency Khumbudzo Ntshavheni called on the International Criminal Court to issue an arrest warrant against Prime Minister Benjamin Netanyahu.
- 21 November – Four Hamas members are killed by Israeli shelling in Tayr Harfa, Lebanon; the pro-Hezbollah Al-Mayadeen television station claims that two of its journalists and a civilian were also killed, shortly after the Israel Defense Forces said it struck several Hezbollah anti-tank missile squads in southern Lebanon and other sites in response to missile fire toward Metula in northern Israel.
- 22 November – The Cabinet of Israel approves a deal to pause fighting in Gaza for four days. The deal, negotiated by Egypt, Qatar, and the United States, will also see Israel release 150 Palestinian prisoners in exchange for the release of some of the hostages held in Gaza, mostly women and children.
- 23 November – The Israel Defense Forces detain Mohammad abu Salmiya, the director of the Al-Shifa Hospital, and several doctors working under him, after a convoy belonging to the World Health Organization was stopped by Israeli soldiers. Israel accuses the director and the doctors of having sheltered Hamas fighters in the hospital.
- 24 November –
  - The 2023 Gaza war ceasefire to pause fighting in Gaza for four days enters into effect at 7AM local time.
  - On the first day of the ceasefire Hamas releases 13 Israeli hostages, some of whom are dual citizens while Israel releases 39 Palestinian prisoners as part of the ceasefire agreement.
  - Hamas releases 10 Thais and a Filipino as part of a separate deal with Bangkok, brokered by Iran.
- 25 November –
  - On day 2 of the ceasefire, Hamas releases 13 Israeli hostages and 4 Thai migrant workers, while Israel releases 39 Palestinian prisoners.
  - The Israeli government will summon the Belgian and Spanish ambassadors following their criticism of Israel for the suffering of Palestinian civilians under Israeli military operations in the Gaza Strip by Belgian Prime Minister Alexander De Croo and Spanish Prime Minister Pedro Sánchez.
- 26 November –
  - Hamas releases three Thai migrant workers and 14 Israeli hostages, while Israel releases 39 Palestinian prisoners.
  - Armed assailants seize and later release a tanker linked to Israeli billionaire Eyal Ofer, with 22 crew members on board, off the coast of Yemen. The United States Navy captures the attackers.
  - Eight Palestinians are killed and at least six others are injured in Israeli raids in the West Bank.
  - The Palestine Red Crescent Society says that a Palestinian farmer was killed and another was injured when they were targeted by Israeli forces in the Maghazi refugee camp in Gaza.
  - Hamas confirms the deaths of several senior commanders including Ahmed Ghandour, the commander of its Northern Gaza brigade, and Ayman Siam, the head of its rocket firing array. The Israel Defense Forces had previously said it had targeted Ghandour and Siam, but did not confirm that they had been killed.
  - Israeli Prime Minister Benjamin Netanyahu becomes the first Israeli head of government to enter the Gaza Strip in two decades, after visiting Israel Defense Forces troops stationed there.
- 27 November –
  - Hamas releases 11 Israeli hostages, while Israel releases 33 Palestinian prisoners.
  - Qatar announces an agreement between Israel and Hamas to extend the ceasefire by two days.
- 28 November –
  - Hamas releases two Thai migrant workers, 10 Israeli hostages and a pet dog, while Israel releases 30 Palestinian prisoners.
  - Two Palestinians are killed during clashes with Israel Defense Forces in the West Bank.
- 29 November –
  - Hamas releases four Thai migrant workers and 12 Israeli hostages while Israel releases 30 Palestinian prisoners. In a separate gesture to Russian President Vladimir Putin, two dual citizens of Israel and Russia are also freed by Hamas.
  - Israel Defense Forces, Shin Bet, and Israel Border Police announce in a joint statement that they killed Muhammad Zubeidi, the commander of the Jenin branch of the Palestinian Islamic Jihad.
  - Two children, aged 14 and 8, are shot dead by IDF troops in Jenin during the raid. The shootings are caught by security cameras.
- 30 November –
  - A deal is reached to extend the ceasefire for at least one further day, after it had been due to expire at 7:00 AM IST Thursday.
  - 2023 Givat Shaul shooting: Three Israelis are killed and six others are wounded in a mass shooting in Givat Shaul, Jerusalem. The two Palestinian gunmen are shot and killed by security forces and an armed civilian at the scene.
  - Spanish Prime Minister Pedro Sanchez has expressed doubts that Israel is abiding by international law in the war, due to the high number of civilian casualties and video footage of growing numbers of children dying.
  - United States Secretary of State Antony Blinken steps up calls for Israel to comply with international law and protect civilians during its military operations in southern Gaza, while reaffirming US support.

=== December ===
- 1 December –
  - The ceasefire between Israel and Hamas ends after a deadline expires on the seventh day. Mediator Qatar says that efforts are ongoing to renew the ceasefire and expressed regret over the resumption of Israeli bombardments.
  - More than 180 Palestinians are killed, and hundreds more are injured, after Israeli warplanes carry out airstrikes on different parts of the Gaza Strip, including the community of Abasan al-Kabira and a home northwest of Gaza City.
  - Hundreds of Malawians travel to Israel to work as farm labourers. Kondwani Nankhumwa, leader of the Democratic Progressive Party has questioned the secrecy of the deal amidst the governments awareness of the ongoing war.
- 2 December –
  - More than 190 Palestinians are killed and hundreds more are wounded by Israeli airstrikes on the Gaza Strip, including Khan Younis in the south.
  - The United Nations say the fighting will worsen the extreme humanitarian emergency in Gaza. UN aid chief Martin Griffiths said that the people of Gaza had nowhere safe to go and very little to survive on.
  - The United States provides BLU-109 bunker buster bombs and other munitions to Israel. Similar bombs made by the US have been used by Israel in the Jabalia refugee camp airstrikes, including a strike that levelled an apartment block, killing more than 100 people.
- 3 December –
  - At least 700 Palestinians have been killed during the last 24 hours by Israeli airstrikes in the Gaza Strip. Rights groups object to Israel's increased attacks in southern Gaza, which Israel had declared as a "safe zone".
- 4 December –
  - At least 316 Palestinians have been killed and 664 injured during the last 24 hours in the Gaza Strip.
  - Telecommunication services have been cut off in the Gaza Strip, the Palestinian telecoms company Paltel has said, as Israel intensifies its military operations.
  - Qatari prime minister Al Thani calls for an "immediate, comprehensive and impartial international investigation" into Israel's military activities in Gaza.
- 5 December –
  - Israeli troops and tanks enter Khan Yunis in the south of the Gaza Strip. Displaced families in the region are heading further south to Rafah, a town on the Egyptian border.
  - More than 100 people are killed in strikes near the Kamal Adwan Hospital in northern Gaza, as Israeli forces encircle the medical facility sheltering people. Witnesses say anyone attempting to leave was being shot at by Israeli snipers.
  - At the Gulf Cooperation Council summit, Qatari prime minister Al Thani calls for a permanent ceasefire in Gaza.
- 6 December –
  - Twenty-two members of a family are killed in an Israeli airstrike on the home in which they were sheltering in the Jabalia refugee camp in northern Gaza.
  - United Nations Secretary-General António Guterres invokes Article 99 of the UN Charter, urging the UN Security Council to act on the war in Gaza and adopt a resolution calling for a ceasefire.
  - UN high commissioner for human rights Volker Türk says his "colleagues describe the situation as apocalyptic" in Gaza, with a "heightened risk of atrocity crimes".
  - The UN agency for Palestinian refugees warns that the situation in Gaza is "getting worse each minute", and that "another wave of displacement is underway" amidst further military operations by Israel.
- 7 December –
  - Amnesty International reports that American-made munitions were used in two Israeli airstrikes on residential buildings in Gaza that killed 43 civilians.
  - The International Criminal Court's Prosecutor Karim Ahmad Khan called for humanitarian aid to be allowed into Gaza, adding that "willfully impeding relief supplies to civilians may constitute a war crime" under the ICC Rome Statute.
  - Israel foreign minister Eli Cohen revokes United Nations humanitarian coordinator Lynn Hastings's residence visa after she stated that "nowhere is safe in Gaza" and does not have the conditions needed to send aid to people.
  - Human Rights Watch and Amnesty International find that Israel targeted journalists in an attack in southern Lebanon, firing artillery shells which killed one journalist and injured six others, concluding this was likely a direct attack on civilians and should be investigated as a war crime.
- 8 December –
  - The United States vetoes a United Nations Security Council draft resolution calling for an immediate humanitarian ceasefire in Gaza. Thirteen other members voted in favor, while Britain abstained.
  - The Gaza Antiquities Ministry reports that the Great Mosque of Gaza, the oldest mosque in the Gaza Strip, was destroyed by Israeli bombardment.
  - The International Federation of Journalists reports that 68 journalists had been killed covering the war, with the majority being Palestinian journalists in the Gaza Strip.
- 9 December –
  - Israel carries out raids in Hebron, Qalqilya, Jericho, Jenin, Salfit and Ramallah in the West Bank.
  - Israel's bombardment of the Gaza Strip hits areas it declared "safe zones", a day after the United States vetoed a UN resolution calling for an immediate humanitarian ceasefire in Gaza.
  - The United States government uses an "emergency declaration" to allow the immediate delivery of 14,000 tank shells to Israel without congressional review.
- 10 December –
  - Jordan and the United Nations agency for Palestinian refugees have accused Israel of aiming to cleanse Gaza of its people through an "indiscriminate and brutal offensive" in a war which meets the "legal definition of genocide".
  - The World Health Organization adopts a resolution that calls for the passage of medical personnel and supplies into Gaza, mandates the documentation of violence against healthcare workers and patients, and seeks funding for hospital reconstruction.
  - The Palestinian Red Crescent Society says Israeli forces bombed and raided an area near the United Nations clinic in Jabalia camp where its emergency teams and medics are operating a medical post.
- 11 December –
  - Israeli forces shoot several medical personnel in Gaza, including the Ministry of Health director general of pharmacy, while they were trying to reach the ministry warehouses to get medical supplies for hospitals.
  - Seven Israeli troops are killed in clashes in the Gaza Strip, bringing the number of IDF personnel killed in action to 104.
  - Egypt and Mauritania invoke United Nations Resolution 377 for the UN General Assembly to discuss an immediate humanitarian ceasefire at an emergency session in New York City, in response to the United States vetoing a UN resolution with a similar objective.
  - An Israeli artillery strike kills the mayor of Taybeh, Marjeyoun District, Lebanon.
- 12 December –
  - Ten Israeli troops are killed in clashes in the Gaza Strip, including a colonel of the Golani Brigade killed in Shuja'iyya, Gaza City, bringing the total number of IDF personnel killed to 115.
- 15 December –
  - The Israel Defense Forces says that it mistakenly shot dead three hostages in friendly fire incidents in the Shuja'iyya neighborhood of Gaza City.
  - Israel authorizes the temporary use of its Kerem Shalom border crossing to deliver humanitarian aid to the Gaza Strip.
- 17 December –
  - Pope Francis accuses the IDF of engaging in war crimes, in response to Israeli snipers killing two Palestinian Christians and injuring seven others who were taking refuge in the Holy Family Church in Gaza City yesterday.
  - The French Foreign Ministry condemns Israel's Wednesday bombing of Rafah for killing one of its staff members, and demands an "immediate and durable" ceasefire.
  - Israeli Air Force airstrikes in Jabalia kill at least 90 people, according to the Gaza Health Ministry.
- 19 December – Israeli airstrikes against a residential area in Rafah kills at least 29 people, while ten others are killed in Jabalia.
- 20 December – The death toll in the Gaza Strip since Israel began airstrikes in response to Hamas leading an invasion of Israel on 7 October increases to at least 20,000 people.
- 21 December – The Israel Defense Forces says that it has established full "operational control" of the Shuja'iyya neighborhood in Gaza City, which has been the scene of intense clashes between Israeli troops and Hamas in recent weeks.
- 24 December – At least 70 people are killed in an Israeli airstrike against the al-Maghazi refugee camp in the Gaza Strip.
- 25 December – High-ranking Iranian general Sayyed Razi Mousavi is killed in an Israeli airstrike in Syria.
- 26 December – Netanyahu announces Intel's plan to build a semiconductor fabrication plant in the country, and a US$3.2 billion grant to the company in "Israel's biggest investment".
- 28 December – Thousands of Palestinians flee Central Gaza as IDF tanks reach the outskirts of Bureij refugee camp.
- 30 December – The Israeli army continues its attacks; dozens of militants have been killed in Gaza with air support, while intense tank and aerial assaults on Khan Yunis persist. Additionally, buildings used by Hamas have been destroyed, and weapons seized.
- 31 December – The Central Bureau of Statistics releases data showing that 9.842 million people live in Israel at the end of 2023, of whom 7.208 million (73.2%) are Jewish, 2.080 million (21.1%) are Arab and 554,000 (5.7%) are other groups.

== Deaths ==
- 11 January — Shimon Baadani, 94 years old, Orthodox rabbi.
- 11 January — Dan Eytan, 91, architect.
- 8 March — Chaim Topol, 87 years old, actor, singer, and illustrator.
- 19 April — Yehonatan Geffen, 76 years old, singer
- 7 October — People killed during Hamas-led attack on Israel:
  - Lior Asulin, 43, footballer (Maccabi Herzliya, Beitar Jerusalem, Hapoel Petah Tikva)
  - Jayar Davidov, chief superintendent, commander of the Israel Police in Rahat (since 2022)
  - Roy Edan, 45, photojournalist
  - Eli Ginsberg, 42, lieutenant colonel, commander of LOTAR (2020–2023)
  - Tomer Leibovich, 19, volleyball player, captain of national under-19 volleyball team
  - Roi Levy, 44, colonel, commander of the Multidimensional Unit (since 2023)
  - Ofir Libstein, 49–50, politician, head of the Sha'ar HaNegev Regional Council (since 2018)
  - Izhar Peled, 61–62, assistant commissioner, commander of Israel Border Police in Judea and Samaria (2016–2020)
  - Shai Regev, 25, news editor
  - Yonatan Steinberg, 43, colonel, commander of the Nahal Brigade (since 2023)
  - Yahav Winner, 37, filmmaker
  - Yaniv Zohar, 54, videojournalist
- 8 October — Leon Bar, 53, lieutenant colonel, senior officer in the West Bank Division
- 10 October — Alim Abdallah, 40, lieutenant colonel, deputy commander of IDF 91st Division.
- 26 October — Baruch Mordechai Ezrachi, 94, Haredi rabbi
- 28 October — Yosef Tzabari, 89, athlete and marathon champion
- 31 October — Arie Levanon, 91, Romanian-born Israeli composer.
- 2 November — Salman Habaka, 33, lieutenant colonel, commander of the 188 Barak Brigade.
- 24 November — Avraham Menchel, 87, footballer (Maccabi Haifa, national team).
- 1 December —
  - Shlomo Avineri, 90, political scientist.
  - Amira Hess, 80, poet.
- 3 December — Avraham Avi-hai, 92, civil servant, journalist and author.
- 6 December — Amos Ettinger, 86, Israeli poet, songwriter, and radio presenter.
- 9 December — Larisa Gershtein, 72, Soviet-born Israeli politician, deputy mayor of Jerusalem (1993–2003).
- 10 December — Edna Mazia, 74, playwright.
- 12 December — Yitzhak Ben-Bashat, 44, IDF officer (Yiftach Brigade, Paran Brigade)
- 24 December — David Libai, 89, jurist and politician, MK (1984–1996), minister of justice (1992–1996) and interior (1995).
- 25 December — Yehoshua Ben-Arieh, 95, geographer, rector of the Hebrew University of Jerusalem (1993–1997).
- 30 December — Shmuel Bilu, 71, musician (Milk and Honey).

== See also ==
- Timeline of the Israeli–Palestinian conflict in 2023
- Timeline of the Gaza war
