= 2023 Hamra junction shooting =

Shooting of British Israeli settler family in the West Bank

2023 Hamra Junction shooting
- Part of the Israeli–Palestinian conflict
- Location: Hamra, Bik'at HaYarden
- Date: 7 April 2023 (UTC+02:00)
- Target: Israelis
- Attack type: Shooting
- Weapon: AK-47
- Deaths: 3
- Perpetrator: Al-Qassam Brigades

On 7 April 2023, in an attack attributed to and claimed by the Al-Qassam Brigades, an Israeli vehicle was shot at near the Hamra junction, killing two women and critically injuring another, who later also died. The casualties were three members of the British–Israeli Dee family from the Israeli settlement of Efrat in the Israeli-occupied West Bank.

== Background ==
There was an upsurge in violence in Israel during April 2023, during which Easter, Passover and Ramadan unusually coincided. On 5 April the 2023 Al-Aqsa clashes, on 6 April the 2023 Israel–Lebanon shellings and on 7 April the 2023 Tel Aviv car-ramming.

The Dee family had moved from London to Israel in 2014 and lived in Efrat, an Israeli settlement in the West Bank. The father, Leo, is a former rabbi and lives with his three surviving children.

== Attack ==
On 7 April 2023, unknown assailants opening fire from their vehicle on a nearby Israeli vehicle, at the Hamra junction, located in Highway 57. The attack was later claimed by the Al-Qassam Brigades. The Israeli vehicle carried 3 family members from Efrat, a 40-year-old mother and her two daughters, Maia, 15, and Rina, 20. Rabbi Leo Dee and his three other children were in a separate car and did not witness the attack.

The police concluded that the incident was caused by a "suspected Palestinian gunman", while traveling in a car in the West Bank. The victims were reportedly shot a total of 22 times with a Kalashnikov assault rifle, first while driving, and then at short range after crashing.

Both sisters were announced dead on the scene by the Magen David Adom, while the critically injured mother, Lucy, was transported to Hadassa Ein Karem hospital in Jerusalem by helicopter, where she died. The victims were buried in Kfar Etzion; Lucy's organs were donated to five recipients.

== Reactions ==
The attack was condemned by Israeli leaders including Benjamin Netanyahu and Isaac Herzog, and by British Chief Rabbi Ephraim Mirvis. The chief commissioner of Israeli Police, Kobi Shabtay, announced that "every citizen that has a licensed weapon should carry it from now onwards".

In a first for the UK government, the British Foreign Secretary James Cleverly wrote a letter to Rabbi Dee, the widower of Lucy and father of Maya and Rina in which he said:

Dear Rabbi Dee,

I am writing to express, on behalf of the UK Government, our deepest condolences on the brutal murder of your wife, Lucy, and your daughters Maia and Rina. I cannot begin to imagine the pain and grief you will be feeling at this awful time.

I was incredibly moved by your decision to donate Lucy's organs and save five lives. It is a testament to the character of you and your family that you were able to find compassion in the darkest moment.

I am glad that my officials are in touch with you to arrange a call with my colleague Lord Tariq Ahmad to express our sorrow and grief for your family. If there is anything that the British government can do to help you or your family, please let us know.

There can be no justification for such senseless and abhorrent violence, and I unequivocally condemn this act of terrorism. The UK remains steadfast in our commitment to work with the Israeli authorities, and all parties in the region, to bring an end to the terrorism that Israel faces, and to the cycle of violence which, as we have seen all too clearly, is so destructive.

As you and your family sit shiva, honouring the lives of Lucy, Maia and Rina, allow me to express again our sympathies. May their memories be a blessing. — James Cleverly, British Foreign Secretary

On 7 May, CNN anchor Christiane Amanpour apologized on-air for mistakenly calling the murder of the family a "shootout" instead of a shooting. Rabbi Dee rejected the apology and expressed skepticism about CNN's future behavior. He stated that he was considering a $1.3 billion lawsuit against the channel, while the Israeli Consulate and Foreign Ministry also announced that they planned to send complaints to the network.

Hamas initially praised the shooting, but did not claim responsibility.

== Aftermath ==
On 4 May, Israeli security forces killed three men in a raid on Nablus in the occupied West Bank. The Israeli government claimed that two were members of Hamas suspected of killing the three British-Israeli women, while the third was suspected of helping them. Hamas's armed wing Al-Qassam Brigades subsequently said that the three Palestinians killed by Israeli forces in the Nablus raid had been responsible for the shooting, naming them as Hassan Qatanani, Muath al-Masri and Ibrahim Jaber. On 29 October, Israeli forces demolished Qatnani's apartment in the Askar Camp on the outskirts of Nablus.

Lucy Dee's organs were donated, saving the lives of five people. Two years after the killings, Leo Dee remarried.

== See also ==
- List of terrorist incidents in 2023
- Timeline of the Israeli–Palestinian conflict in 2023
