= 2023 Tel Aviv attack =

2023 Tel Aviv attack may refer to:

- 2023 Tel Aviv car-ramming, in April
- July 2023 Tel Aviv attack
