= Victor Topaller =

Russian-American journalist (1958–2018)

- Виктор Александрович Топаллер
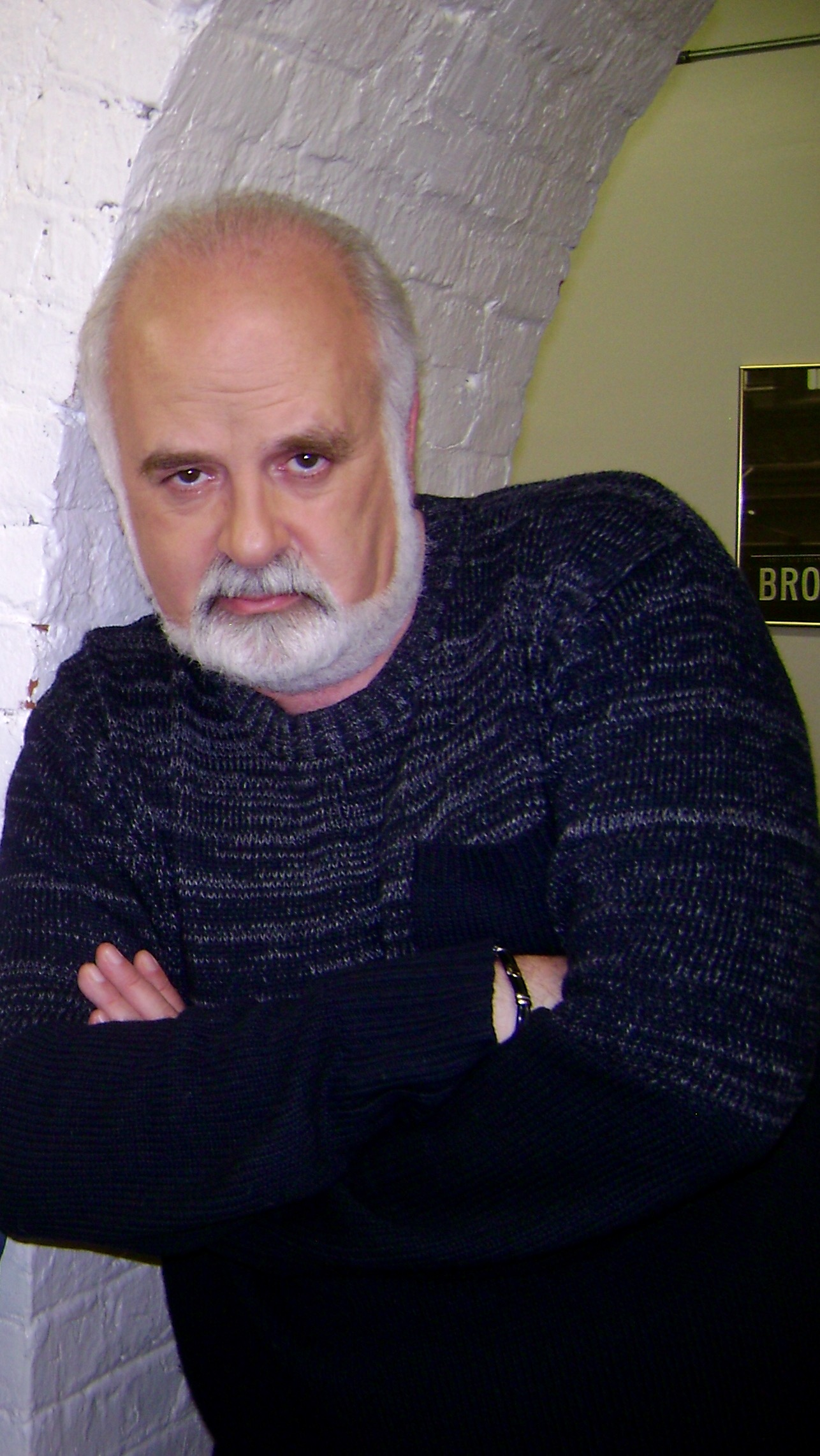
- Topaller in 2007.
- Born: July 13, 1958; Moscow, Russia
- Died: January 10, 2018 (aged 59)
- Citizenship: Soviet Union; Israel; United States
- Known for: Journalism and talk show hosting

Victor Alexandrovich Topaller (Russian: Виктор Александрович Топаллер; July 13, 1958 – January 10, 2018) was a Russian-American journalist, director, and television/radio personality, known for his work on RTVi. During the 1990s, he worked in Israeli news television and founded the Tel Aviv newspaper Русский израильтянин (lit. 'The Russian Israeli'). He later moved to America where he conducted over 700 interviews for his RTVi talk show, In New York with Victor Topaller, from 2000 to 2017.

== Early life ==
He was born to Alexander Viktorovich Topaller (b. September 30, 1930) and Lyudmila Zalmanovna (b. October 19, 1929) in Moscow. For a year, he studied acting at the Boris Shchukin Theatre Institute before transferring to the Russian Institute of Theatre Arts, from which he graduated in 1981, majoring in directing.

During the 1980s, he staged performances including drama and pop music festivals in Moscow, Leningrad, Riga, and "the Far East".

== Move to Israel (1990) ==
Topaller and his family immigrated to Israel in 1990, where he directed at a theater school. He wrote articles for the newspapers Sputnik, Novosti Nedeli, Globus, and Vremya.

Between 1993 and 1995, he hosted performances in Brussels, Belgium, including a show in French with Belgian and Russian actors. Despite offers to continue work in western Europe (including Belgium and England), he returned to Israel.

After returning to Israel in 1995, he became involved in National Israeli television, where he hosted Ракурс (lit. 'Angle') and Vis-a-vis with Victor Topaller. He wrote articles for Our Country, the first Israeli newspaper in Russian. In 1997, Topaller founded Tel Aviv newspaper Русский израильтянин (lit. 'The Russian Israeli') and was its deputy editor-in-chief as well as a regular author.

Topaller staged a production titled Nowhere to Go in Tel Aviv's Heichal Hatarbut, "dedicated to the 5th anniversary of [the 1990] Russian aliyah". He also hosted the International Festival of Humor at Menora Mivtachim Arena.

== Move to America and RTVi (2000) ==
In 2000, Topaller was granted a residence permit to work in America as an "extraordinary person" due to his journalism achievements, after which he began his employment with RTVi. Simultaneously, he worked in radio stations and newspapers (such as The Jewish World and the Russian-language newspaper Our Canada).

In 2008, he staged a Russian-language production of Efraim Kishon's play Ktuba: or, The Marriage Contract in New York's Chaverim Theater. The play was translated to Russian by Mariana Belenky.

Throughout the late 2000s and early 2010s, he hosted multiple radio shows on Davidzon Radio. These were Full Shalom, a radio program co-hosted by Israeli activist Larisa Gershtein (former deputy mayor of Jerusalem), which was "devoted to...relations between America and Israel". Another was Ricochet. A third example was Top Parade with Victor Topaller, which was focused on the 1960s-1980s Soviet pop music and performers, many of whom were Topaller's friends.

His RTVi show In New York with Victor Topaller ran between 2000 and 2017. Its over 700 guests included musicians, writers, actors, directors, and politicians.

From 2008 to 2017, Topaller hosted RTVi documentary series Американский Ликбез (lit. 'American Education'), which presented American cultural and political history to Russian audiences. Other shows included Point of View and Crossroads.

=== Cancellations following RTVi ownership change ===
Circa 2017, RTVi changed ownership when owner Ruslan Sokolov transferred the channel to an anonymous investor — possibly Rostec's Sergey Chemezov — who paid $60 million, which allowed the channel to be restarted under the leadership of Alexey Pivovarov.

However, a year later, the funding was severely reduced, leading to the firing and the cancellation of various American shows in favor of airing programming from Moscow.

According to Topaller, the "first decree" of the new leadership, which was made on the first day, was the cancellation of American Education, even though 8 upcoming episodes from its All That Jazz season had been completed.

He was also informed that In New York with Victor Topaller was closing and would be replaced with Breakfast with Topaller (later called At the Fireplace with Topaller). It followed the same concept, except it was shorter (from 48 minutes to 24); the production studio would change from RTVi inhouse production to Rating-TV; the producers would decide the guests, not Topaller himself; and it would change from a studio setting to a home environment, wherein Topaller's wife would serve tea to the guests. By April, 10 episodes of At the Fireplace with Topaller were produced; after which Topaller received a letter terminating his employment. A few days after receiving it, the financial director of RTVi requested a meeting with Topaller to tell him the letter was invalid. Topaller discredited the channel's operations, calling this situation an example of its "sluggish schizophrenia".

On September 30, 2017, Topaller's friends informed him that RTVi held a general meeting to discuss the closure of the channel (He later wrote, "Of course, no one invited me").

== Political beliefs ==
In 2017, he wrote multiple columns supporting then-president Donald Trump. He praised the ban on Muslim immigrants and wrote that those who criticize Trump are "left-liberal trash and punks" who "deny common sense [and] provoke a civil war".

== See also ==
- List of Russian Americans
- Russian language in Israel
