= Novosti Nedeli =

Russian-language Israeli newspaper

Novosti Nedeli (Hebrew: נובוסטי נדלי; Russian: Новости Недели, lit. News of the Week), sometimes shortened to Novosti, is an Israeli weekly newspaper geared at the Russian-speaking population of the country. Based in Tel Aviv, it is the oldest Russian-language weekly in Israel.

== History ==
Novosti Nedeli started in 1989 by a group of olim from the Soviet Union. In 1990 it was purchased by a group of Israeli journalists, including Eli Azur. The paper is part of a group of several other Russian-language publications owned by Azur.

The publication became a daily in 1990, and continued in this format until 2003. The newspaper has partnered with The Jerusalem Post and Maariv, allowing it to translate some of the articles from these publications into Russian.

== Exposés ==
In 2001, Novosti Nedeli covered the issue of fraud against Russian-speaking immigrants in Israel, leading to a special parliamentary session on the matter.

== Attachments ==
Multiple magazines have been attached to Novosti Nedeli, published by the same company. These include: Echo (Russian: Эхо), Luch (Russian: Луч) and Sekret (Russian: Секрет).

== Controversies ==
In 2003, the publication was sued by the publisher of Ogoniok, a Russian magazine, for plagiarizing 19 of its articles. Novosti Nedeli was ordered to pay a fine in 2007, totaling over ILS 315,000. In 2007, Novosti was handed a similar lawsuit by Kommersant, this time for ILS 4.64 million, for copying 232 articles.

== Notable journalists ==
Knesset members Nino Abesadze and Marina Solodkin worked for Novosti Nedeli. Russian-Israeli-American journalist Victor Topaller also wrote for the newspaper.

== See also ==
- List of newspapers in Israel
- Vesti (Israeli newspaper)
