= Izhar Peled =

Israeli police officer (1961–2023)

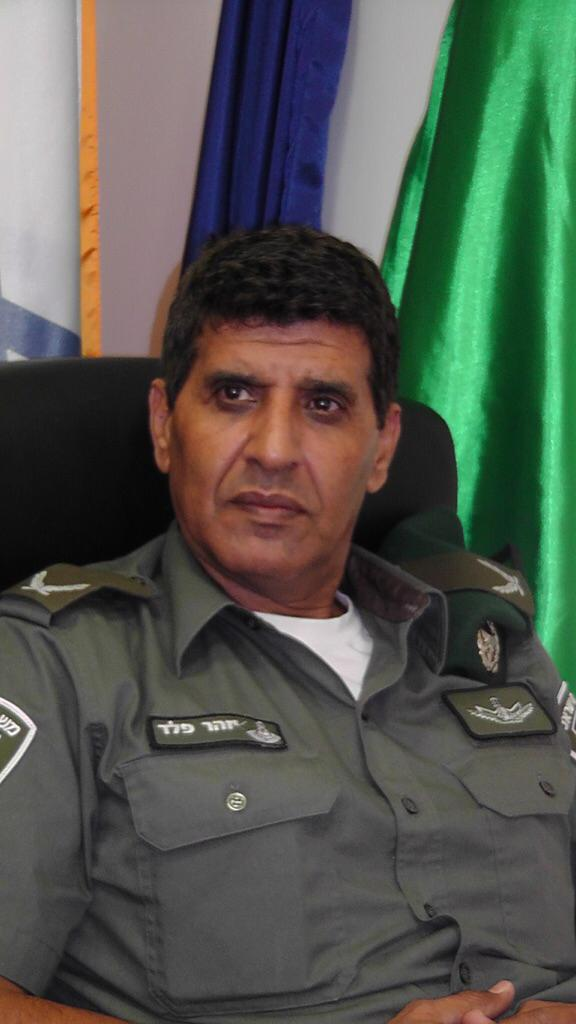

Personal details
- Born: יזהר פלד; 1961 Kfar Aza, Israel
- Died: 7 October 2023 (aged 61–62) Kfar Aza, Israel
- Occupation: Police officer

Yizhar Peled (Hebrew: יזהר פלד; 1961 – 7 October 2023) was an Israeli police officer with the rank of Assistant Commissioner. He served as commander of the West Bank Border Police until his retirement in 2020. He was killed in the Kfar Aza massacre, the opening strike of the Gaza war.

== Biography ==
Peled began his service in the Israel Defense Forces (IDF) in the Paratroopers Brigade and rose to become an officer. In 1995, he was appointed commander of the Gaza Border Police Operations Center. and in 1996 was appointed Chief Operations Officer of the Central District Border Police. and in 1999 he was appointed Chief Operations Officer of the Gaza Border Police. In 2001 he was appointed Settlement Branch Officer in the Border Police and in 2004 Head of Operations. In March 2005 he was promoted to the rank of Commander and appointed Deputy Commander of the West Bank Border Police. In 2007 he was appointed Head of the Settlement and Volunteers Department in the Border Police, in 2010 he was appointed Commander of the Arava Border Police, and in 2011 he was appointed Commander of the Southern District Border Police.

On 27 November 2012, Peled became Commander of the Jerusalem Border Police with the rank of Assistant Commissioner. During his tenure, he led the Israeli police response to violent rioting in East Jerusalem after the kidnapping and murder of Mohammed Abu Khdeir. At the same time, his family in Kfar Aza was facing mortar attacks from the Gaza Strip.

In July 2016 he was appointed Commander of the West Bank Border Police. He retired from the police in July 2020.

== Personal life ==
Peled was married to Gila, a nurse by profession, and was the father of four children. He was a resident of Kfar Aza.

Peled was killed at his home in Kfar Aza with his wife Gila and son on the first day of the surprise attack on Israel on 7 October 2023.
