= Leon Bar =

Col. (res.) Leon Bar
- ליאון בר (בן מוחה)
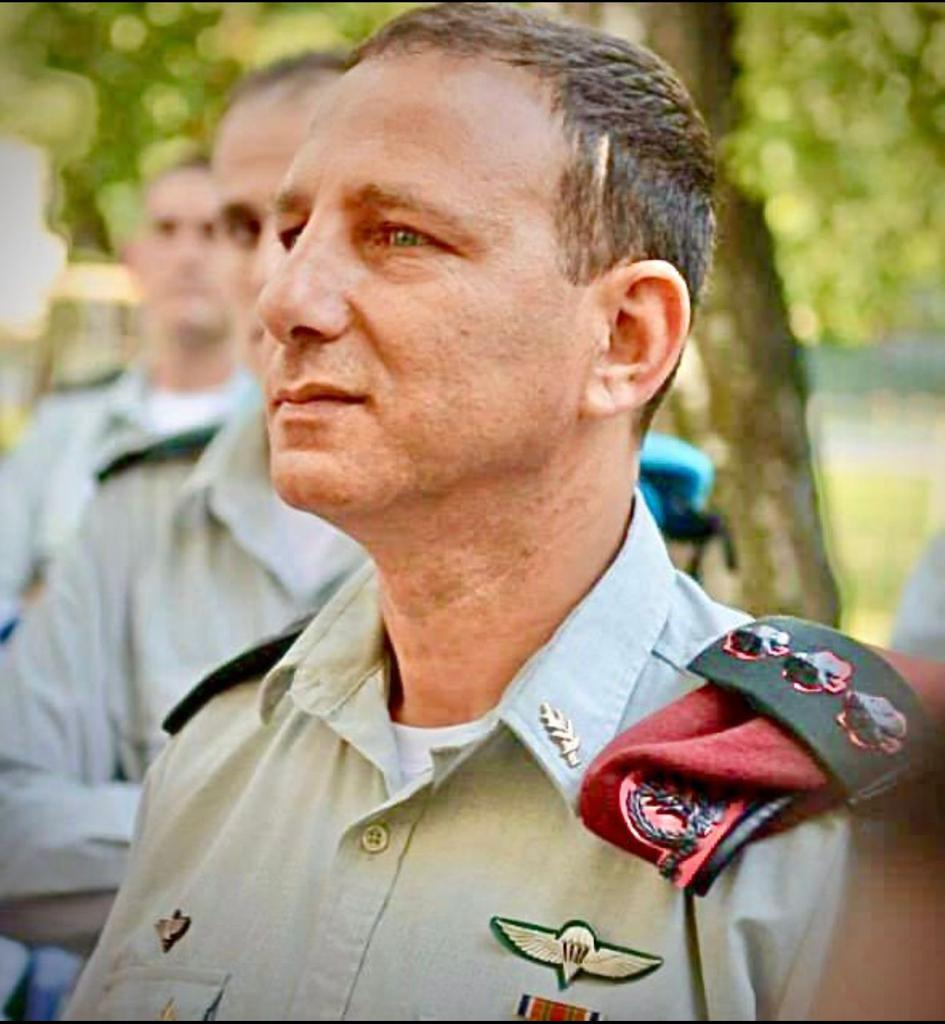
- Born: 11 April 1970; Kiryat Gat
- Died: 8 October 2023 (aged 53); Route 232 (Israel) near the Black Arrow Monument
- Burial place: Gedera Cemetery in Gedera, Israel
- Military career
- Service years: 1989–2023
- Rank: Colonel (Hebrew: אלוף משנה, Aluf mishne)
- Unit: Judea and Samaria Division
- Awards: The President's Medal for Civilian Heroism (posthumously)

Leon Bar (Ben Mocha) (Hebrew: לאון בר; 11 April 1970 – 8 October 2023) was a retired IDF colonel who, on 7 October 2023, saved dozens of civilians from the fighting in Sderot and the massacre at the Nova Festival. The next day, on 8 October, he was killed by a terrorist who ambushed him near the Black Arrow Monument as he and his son Omer were searching for additional survivors of the October 7 massacre.
