= Yehoshua Ben-Arieh =

Israeli geographer (1928–2023)

- יהושע בן אריה
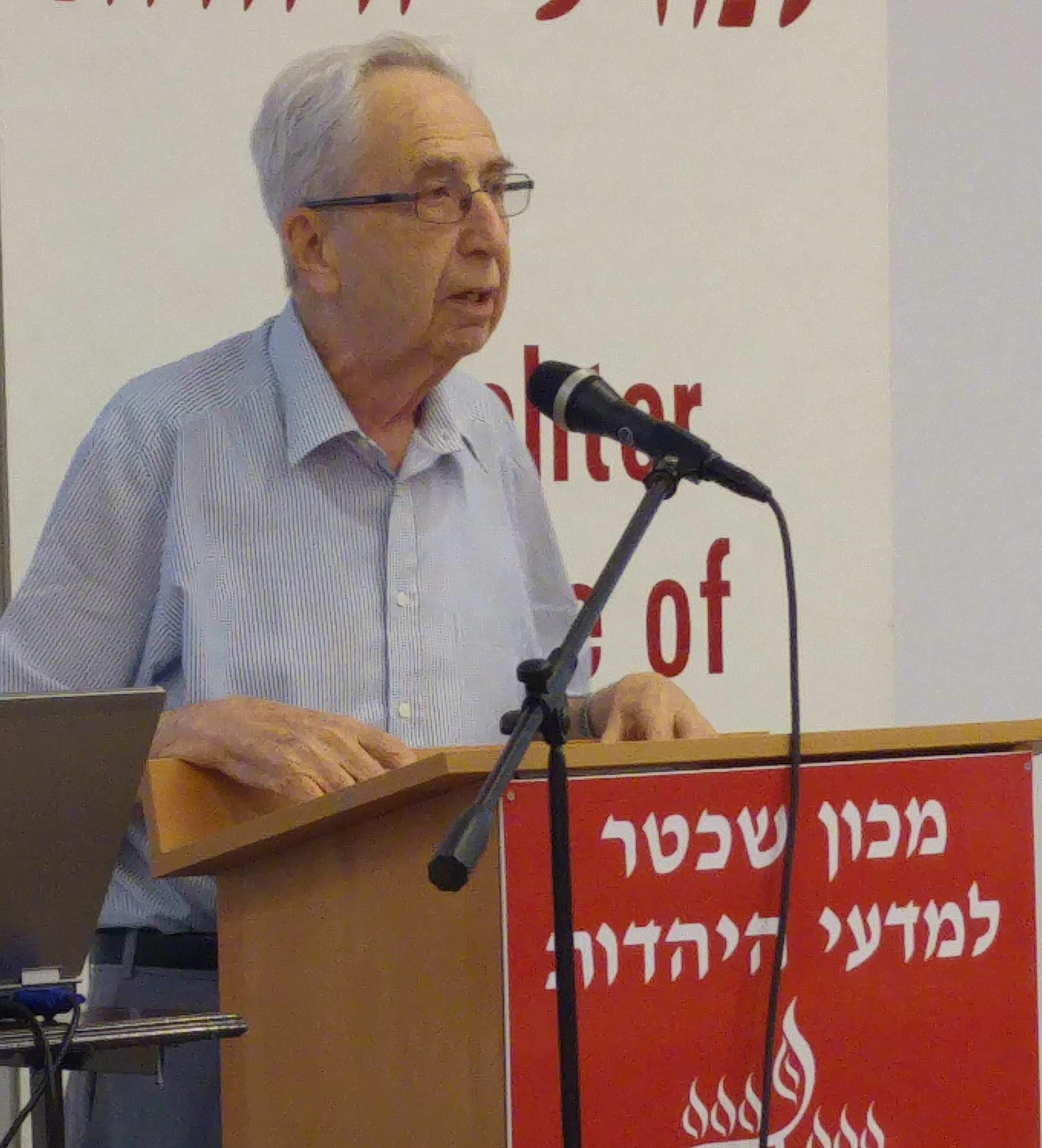

Personal details
- Born: 9 May 1928 Petah Tikva, Mandatory Palestine
- Died: 25 December 2023 (aged 95) Jerusalem

Yehoshua Ben-Arieh (Hebrew: יהושע בן אריה; 9 May 1928 – 25 December 2023) was an Israeli geographer. He served as rector of the Hebrew University of Jerusalem from 1993 to 1997. He won the Israel Prize in 1999. He died on 25 December 2023, at the age of 95.

== Biography ==
Yehoshua Ben-Arieh was born in Petah Tikva. He was a relative of the founder of Petah Tikva, Yehoshua Stampfer, and named after him.

== Academic career ==
Ben-Arieh has been described as the founding father of historical geography, an important branch of geographical research in Israel.

Ben-Arieh lectured at the Hebrew University of Jerusalem from 1965, becoming a tenured professor in 1979. He served as dean of the Faculty of Humanities in 1982–1985. In 1997, he was appointed rector of the Hebrew University. He was a research fellow at the University College of London, where he later served as a visiting professor. He also taught at the University of Maryland and Carleton University in Canada.

Early on in his career, Ben-Arieh branched out from geography to historical geography, which focuses on “historical relics in the present landscape.” His interest in the "geography that lies behind the history" was sparked by encountering Clifford Darby's Historical Geography of England during a sabbatical in England in 1964–1965.

== Published works ==
- The Rediscovery of the Holy Land in the 19th Century
- Jerusalem in the Nineteenth Century
- Painting the Holy Land in the Nineteenth Century
