= Agriculture in Palestine =

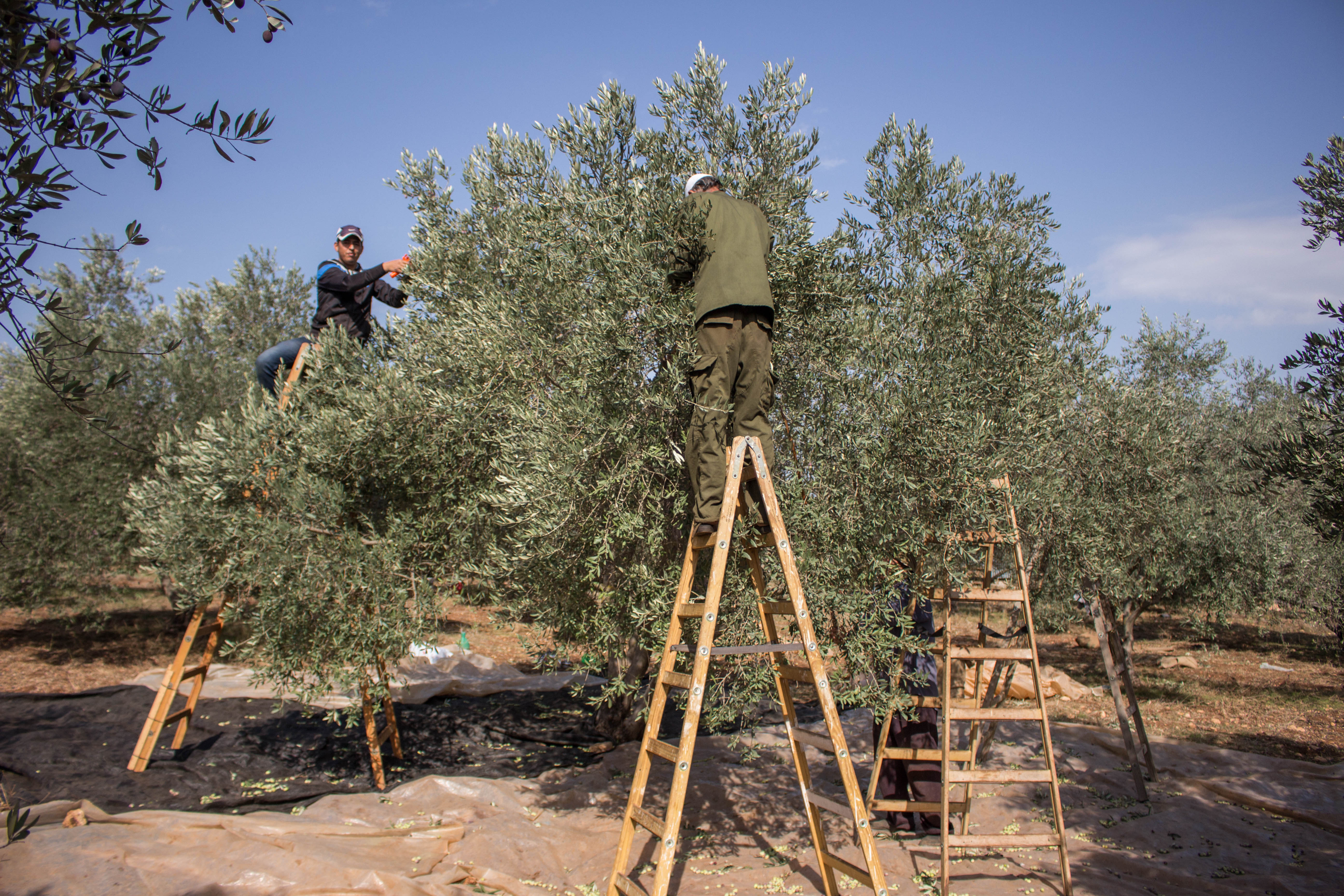
Palestinian farmers harvesting olives using traditional methods

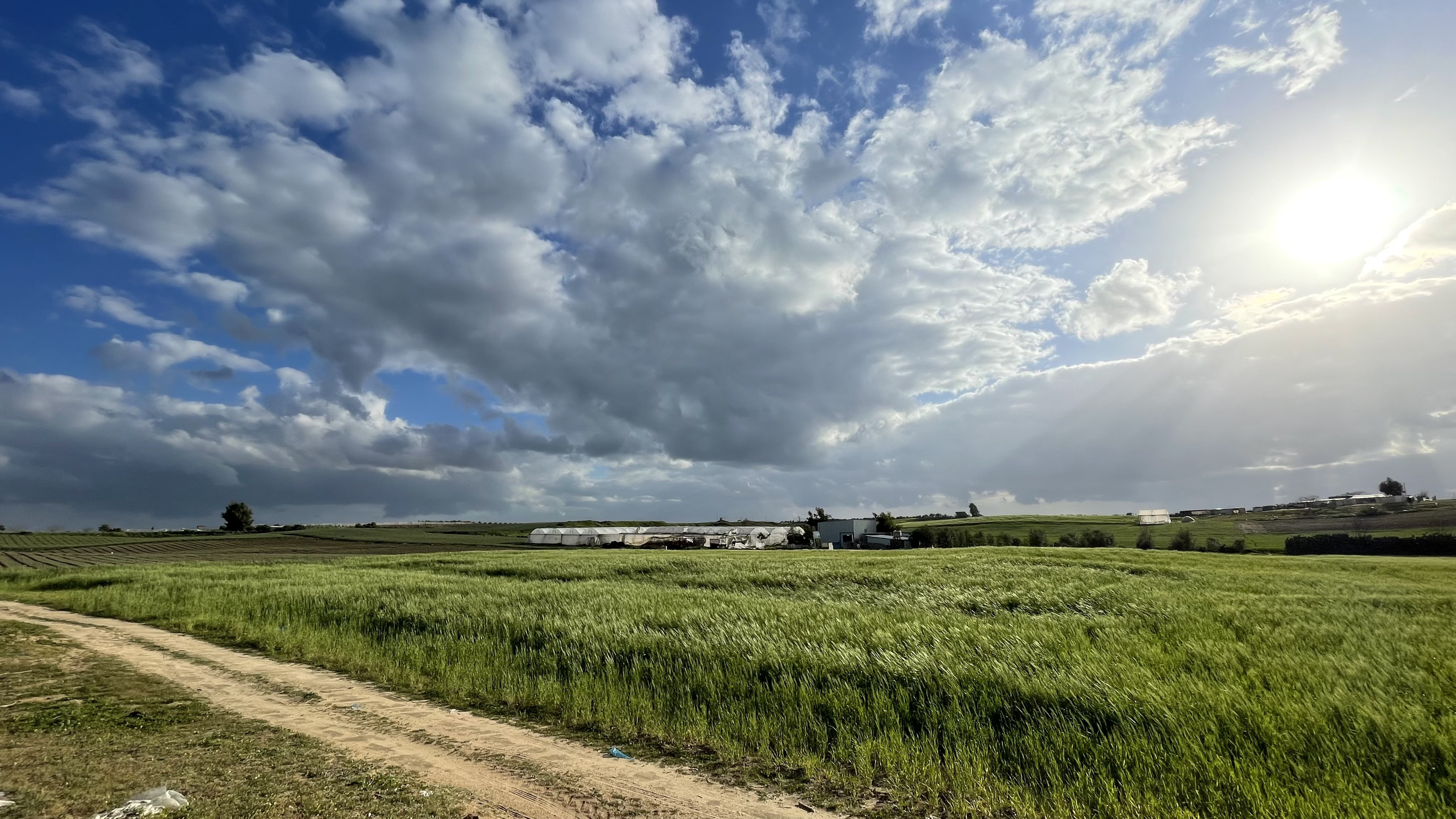
Wheat fields in the Gaza Strip in 2023, before the Israeli invasion

Agriculture in Palestine is a mainstay in the economy of Palestine. The production of agricultural goods supports the population's sustenance needs and fuels Palestine's export economy. According to the Council for European Palestinian Relations, the agricultural sector formally employs 13.4% of the population and accounts for 90% of informal employment. In the late 2000s unemployment rates in Palestine increased, and the agricultural sector became the most impoverished sector in Palestine. Unemployment rates peaked in 2008 when they reached 41% in the Gaza Strip.

According to World Bank, Palestinian agriculture suffers from widespread use of land for nature reserves as well as military and settler use. Because the root of the conflict is with land, the disputes between Israel and Palestine are well-manifested in the agriculture of Palestine.

== History ==
After the Six Day War (1967), Israel's initial occupation of the West Bank led to an encouragement of agriculture. Moshe Dayan actively encouraged its expansion, and as a result, agricultural productivity increased on an annual basis by 16%. Permission was extended to expand on land that had hitherto been neglected. A change in policy occurred in 1976, and by 1979, when the new Likud government was in power, incentives for Palestinian agriculture stopped. The government considered local agriculture a hindrance to its aim of annexing uncultivated land. As a result, water quotas for Palestinian farmers were incrementally reduced, forcing cultivators to leave their lands and seek jobs as day laborers in Israel. The end effect of this decision was that by 1985, the land under Palestinian cultivation in the West Bank decreased by 40%.

The sale of goods from Palestine to Israel became subjected to licensing and further restricted on European markets starting in 1984. Israel was not a commercial producer of olive products, so Palestine became a captive market on things Israel needed and restricted on everything else. Palestine had three other problems that restricted farm production. Most farmers were sharecroppers having to split up to 50% with the landlords, going through middlemen to retailers meant a fourteen-fold gain over the farmers poor prices, and there was a lack of marketing.

=== Gaza war ===
During the Gaza war, agriculture in the Gaza Strip was severely impacted by Israeli bombing and attacks. In June 2024, UNOSAT, the United Nations' satellite imagery agency, stated 57 percent of Gaza's permanent crop fields showed significant declines in density and health. According to the Food and Agriculture Organization, the damage to Gaza's agricultural lands has impacted its food sovereignty.

As of July 28, 2025, 86%, or nearly 13,000 hectares (32,000 acres), of Gaza's farmland had been destroyed by Israel, leaving only 1.5% of the land usable by Palestinians, according to new UN figures. Before the conflict, Gaza was a thriving agricultural hub, contributing approximately 10% to the Gaza Strip's economy. In May 2020, FAO called the agricultural situation in Gaza worrying and considered it a factor in exacerbating the famine in Gaza.
