= 2023 Israel–Palestine tensions =

Part of the Israeli–Palestinian conflict

Coordinates: 31.778°N 35.236°E

- Part of the Israeli–Palestinian conflict
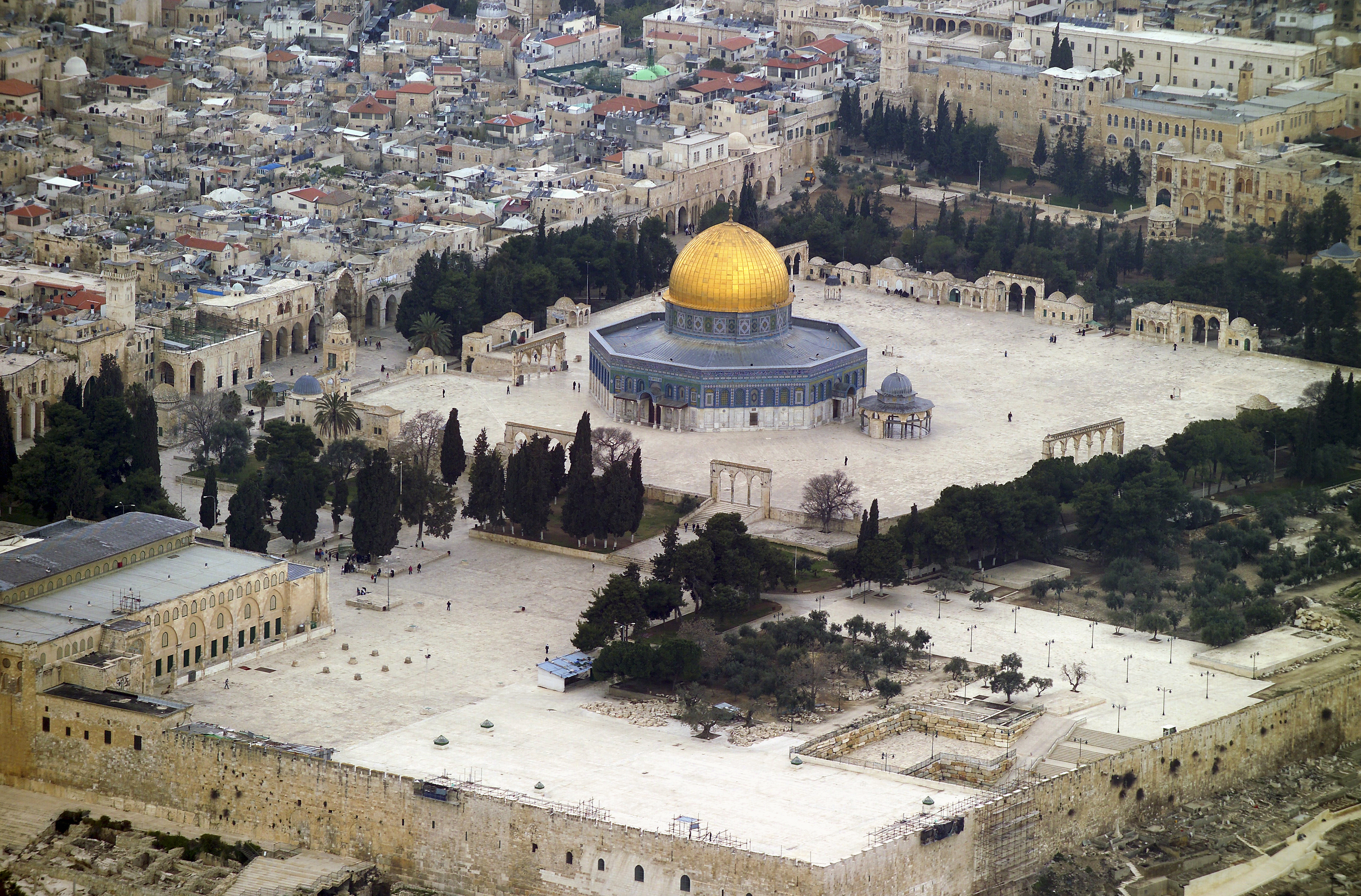
- The Temple Mount, also known as the Al-Aqsa compound, where the clashes occurred
- Date: 5 April 2023 (3 years ago)
- Location: Al-Aqsa Mosque compound, Jerusalem

Parties
Israel Police	Palestinians

Casualties and losses
1 police officer injured	50 injured
- At least 400 Palestinians arrested

A series of violent confrontations occurred between Palestinians and Israeli police at the Al-Aqsa Mosque compound in Jerusalem in April 2023. After the evening Ramadan prayer, Palestinians barricaded themselves inside the mosque, prompted by reports that Jews planned to sacrifice a goat at the site (which is forbidden by Israeli law). In response, Israeli police raided the mosque in riot gear, injuring 50 people and arresting at least 400.

In the immediate aftermath of the clashes, Palestinian militant groups fired rockets into Israel from the Gaza Strip and Lebanon – acts broadly construed as a response to the events at Al-Aqsa. Later that year, one justification given by Hamas for carrying out the 7 October attacks against Israel was in retaliation for the events at Al-Aqsa.

== Background ==
Since 2001, Palestinian groups have frequently fired rockets and mortars into Israel proper, targeting mostly civilians and triggering retaliatory strikes. Most rockets have been fired from the Gaza Strip, controlled by Hamas. During the 2006 Lebanon War, Hezbollah launched a large amount of rockets from Lebanon to Israel. Since the end of the war, attacks from Lebanon have been less common than attacks from Gaza.

The clashes occurred during a period of increased Israeli–Palestinian tensions due to the convergence of the Muslim holy month of Ramadan, the Jewish holiday of Passover, and the Christian Holy Week.

Since the beginning of Ramadan on 22 March, Muslim worshippers had attempted to stay overnight in the Al-Aqsa mosque, a practice usually permitted only in the last 10 days of the holiday (11–21 April). Israel Police had entered the mosque to evict worshippers nightly over Ramadan.

On 3 April, Israel Police detained a Jewish activist with the Temple Mount Administration in an attempt to head off attempts by Jewish groups to contravene the ban on Jewish prayer in the Al-Aqsa Mosque compound and perform a ritual sacrifice for Passover, which would begin the evening of 4 April. The same day, the National Security Minister Ben-Gvir advocated for Jewish groups to go to Temple Mount during Passover, but refrain from ritual sacrifice. According to the status quo, Jews are allowed to visit the Temple Mount site but not pray there.

== Incident ==
The confrontations began on the night of 4 April, when a few hundred Palestinians barricaded themselves in the Al-Aqsa mosque after Ramadan prayers amid concern that Jews might head to the Temple Mount to perform a ritual sacrifice, despite its prohibition. In response, Israeli police raided the mosque in riot gear. According to Palestinians, police threw stun grenades, fired rubber bullets, and beat Palestinians on the floor with batons, injuring at least 50 people and arresting 400. According to the Israeli police, Palestinians threw stones and launched fireworks at police. A video released by Israeli police showed that fireworks were used inside the mosque. One police officer was injured. The events heightened tensions between Israelis and Palestinians and have drawn international attention to the ongoing conflict in the region.

The next night, Palestinian worshippers barricaded themselves in the mosque again and were forcibly removed by Israeli police.

== Palestinian response ==
Following the incident, Palestinian militant groups warned of further confrontation. On the day of the Al-Aqsa violence, over a dozen rockets were fired towards Israel from the Hamas-controlled Gaza Strip. The Israel Defense Forces (IDF) claimed that nine rockets were fired from the Gaza Strip toward Israel.

On 6 April 2023, dozens of rockets were fired from Lebanon into Israel. According to Israel, the rockets from Lebanon were fired by Palestinian factions Hamas and PIJ with Hezbollah's approval. On 7 April, the Israeli Air Force retaliated by striking targets in Tyre, Lebanon as well as in the Gaza Strip.

Since 2001, Palestinian groups have frequently fired rockets and mortars into Israel proper, targeting mostly civilians and triggering retaliatory strikes. Most rockets have been fired from the Gaza Strip, controlled by Hamas. During the 2006 Lebanon War, Hezbollah launched a large amount of rockets from Lebanon to Israel. Since the end of the war, attacks from Lebanon have been less common than attacks from Gaza.

Furthermore, two salvoes of rocket fire came from Syria between 9–10 April towards the occupied Golan Heights. It was reported that the Liwa al-Quds, a Palestinian militia loyal to the Assad regime, claimed responsibility for the attack.

On 7 October 2023, Hamas launched a major surprise attack on Israel with rocket barrage and an incursion, igniting the Gaza war. The commander of the Izz ad-Din al-Qassam Brigades, Mohammed Deif, claimed the attack was conducted in response to "desecration of the Al-Aqsa Mosque".

On 6 April 2023, dozens of rockets were fired from Lebanon into Israel. The Israel Defense Forces has said that it had intercepted 25 rockets fired from Lebanon. Warning sirens had sounded in the town of Shlomi and in Betzet in northern Israel. A minimum of 4 rockets landed in Israeli territory, wounding three civilians.

According to Israel, the rockets were fired by Palestinian factions Hamas and PIJ with Hezbollah's approval. Israeli military spokesman Avichay Adraee also said that possible Iranian involvement in the attacks was being investigated. Lt. Col. Richard Hecht, an Israeli military spokesman, said that Hezbollah and Lebanon shared some responsibility.

In the early morning of 7 April, the Israeli Air Force retaliated by striking targets in Tyre, Lebanon as well as in the Gaza Strip. Israeli airstrikes did not target Hezbollah positions and Hezbollah insisted that it will not get involved in "local attacks" by Israel in Lebanon.

The attacks were the largest escalation between the two countries since the 2006 Lebanon War and came as the leaders of Hamas and Hezbollah chiefs met in Beirut.

== Reactions ==
The Times of Israel reported a senior Israeli official's assessment that police "went too far" in their treatment of the Palestinians, that it lent weight to the al-Aqsa is in danger rallying cry, encouraged Israel’s enemies, and damaged Israel's reputation. The official called for a review of the officers' conduct, as they had been ordered to act with restraint. However, he stated that the police were compelled to enter the mosque after receiving intelligence that numerous Palestinians had stored weapons there with the intention to attack security personnel and Israeli civilians. Another Israeli security official blamed the Jordan-appointed Jerusalem Waqf for not doing enough against Palestinian rioters. The Palestinian Authority and Hamas condemned the Israeli police action, which they described as a crime. Israeli authorities defended their actions as necessary to maintain public order and safety.

- Lead spokesperson for the external affairs of the European Union Peter Stano said that the EU is "deeply concerned" by the violence at Al-Aqsa Mosque in Jerusalem and calls on all parties to show restraint at a time of religious holidays.
- Leader of Turkey's Republican People's Party Kemal Kılıçdaroğlu condemned the attack.
- Emir of Kuwait Nawaf Al-Ahmad Al-Jaber Al-Sabah condemned Israeli aggression against Al-Aqsa Mosque.
- (Canada) Canadian Prime Minister Justin Trudeau expressed concern and called for a de-escalation of violence.
- In a statement by the United Arab Emirates Ministry of Foreign Affairs and International Cooperation, "strongly condemned the storming of Al-Aqsa Mosque by Israeli police ... and emphasized that worshipers should not barricade themselves inside the mosque and places of worship with weapons and explosives.".
- The Foreign Ministry of Oman issued a statement denouncing and condemning the Israel Defense Forces' storming of the Al Aqsa Mosque.
- Syria It was reported that the Liwa al-Quds, a Palestinian militia loyal to the Assad regime (not to be confused with the Al-Quds Brigades), claimed responsibility for the attacks. The IDF said Syria was responsible for such attacks. Israel said that a drone had hit the rocket launchers in Syria. Israeli warplanes also struck targets belonging to the Syrian Armed Forces. The Syrian military said that it had intercepted some missiles, but damage did occur.

Furthermore, the actions of the Israeli Police have been condemned by the ministries of foreign affairs of Qatar, Turkey, Jordan, Saudi Arabia, Bahrain, Iran, Morocco, Algeria, Pakistan, Afghanistan, Bangladesh and Malaysia.

=== Reaction to Palestine's response ===
In a written statement, the United Nations Interim Force in Lebanon (UNIFIL) described the situation as "extremely serious" and urged restraint. It stated that UNIFIL chief Aroldo Lázaro Sáenz was in contact with authorities on both sides.

- China: Chinese special envoy to the Middle East, Zhai Jun, held a conference with envoys of the Arab League of its member states urging "relevant sides to act in accordance with relevant U.N. resolutions, and earnestly respect and maintain the historical status quo of the holy sites in Jerusalem, and shared what China has done to ease the situation," calling for a United Nations Security Council emergency meeting.
- Lebanon: Strikes in Lebanon took place south of Tyre. Early on 7 April, explosions were reported around the Rashideh refugee camp, 5 km from Tyre. The village of Al-Qulaila was also reported to be hit by the strikes, and pictures showed a small bridge was destroyed. Prime Minister Najib Mikati condemned the rockets fired towards Israel from its soil. He added that Lebanon rejects the use of its territory to carry out operations that destabilise the situation. The Lebanese Government and UNIFIL also began investigating the source of the rocket attacks.
- France: The Ministry for Europe and Foreign Affairs condemned the rocket strikes against Israeli territory.
- Greece: Greece's Ministry of Foreign Affairs condemned the launch of rockets against Israel, and called for both sides to avoid further escalation of the conflict.
- Iran: Ministry of Foreign Affairs Spokesman Nasser Kanaani strongly condemned the attacks in Southern Lebanon and the Gaza Strip.
- Spain: The Ministry of Foreign Affairs, European Union, and Cooperation condemned the rocket attacks against Israel, and calls for restraint to prevent violence.
- Qatar: The Ministry of Foreign Affairs condemned Israeli aggression in Southern Lebanon and the Gaza Strip.
- Ukraine: The Ministry of Foreign Affairs condemned the usage of rockets against Israel, and expressed deep concern for the region.
- United Kingdom: Foreign Secretary James Cleverly condemned the rocket strikes against Israel and recognized its right to self-defend.
- United States: State Department Deputy Spokesperson Vedant Patel stated "We condemn the launch of rockets from Lebanon and Gaza. Our commitment to Israel’s security is ironclad. We recognize Israel’s legitimate right to defend itself against all forms of aggression." According to The Times of Israel, the "Biden administration had blocked the UN Security Council from issuing a statement on the latest uptick in violence, fearing that it would be used to draw an equivalency between its actions and those of terror groups."
- Gaza An IDF spokesman said that they had targeted 10 sites in Gaza, which included production sites, research and development sites, and tunnel infrastructure. The IDF said that it had carried out strikes at Beit Hanoun and Khan Yunis. The Gaza Health Ministry said that a children's hospital was damaged, causing distress among the young patients.

== See also ==
- May 2023 Gaza Israel Clashes: Fighting between Palestinian armed groups and Israel between 9–13 May 2023
- October 2023 Hamas Attack on Israel: Codenamed "Operation Al-Aqsa Flood" by Palestinian groups involved
- Timeline of the Israeli–Palestinian conflict in 2023
