= Larisa Gershtein =

Israeli activist, singer and politician (1951–2023)

- לריסה גרשטיין
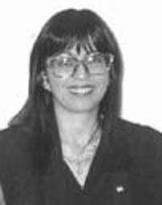

Deputy Mayor of Jerusalem
- In office 2 November 1993 – 16 February 2003

Personal details
- Born: 20 August 1951; Kirghiz SSR, USSR
- Died: 9 December 2023 (aged 72); Israel

Larisa Gershtein (Hebrew: לריסה גרשטיין, Russian: Герштейн, Лариса Иосифовна; 20 August 1951 – 9 December 2023) was a Soviet-born Israeli activist, singer and politician. She served as Deputy Mayor of Jerusalem from 1993 to 2003. She founded the Bulat Okudzhava Foundation in Israel and was Chairman of the Committee for the Defense of Democracy and Human Rights.

== Early life and education ==
Larisa Gershtein was born on 20 August 1951. Her father was Joseph Abramovich Gershtein (11 March 1919, Kyiv – 15 December 2018, Jerusalem), a Kyrgyz Soviet documentary film director. Her mother's family was exiled to the Kyrgyz SSR in 1940 from Western Ukraine. In 1952, the family moved to Frunze, Kirghiz SSR, and in 1961 to Leningrad.

Gershtein graduated from the Faculty of Chemistry of Leningrad State Pedagogical Institute, then repatriated to Israel with her parents in 1975. For some time, she worked at the Technion – Israel Institute of Technology. In 1990, she married Eduard Kuznetsov. She worked with her husband at Radio Liberty.

== Career ==
Gershtein served as deputy mayor of Jerusalem from December 1993 to February 2003. She adhered to right-wing political views and was opposed to compromise in the Arab-Israeli conflict. Since the late 1970s she has performed songs by Bulat Okudzhava at concerts. In 1978, she made a tour of the United States. She performed songs in seven languages: Russian, Hebrew, English, Spanish, Yiddish, Judaeo-Spanish and Romani. She also translated Okudzhava's songs into Hebrew.

== Death ==
Gershtein died on 9 December 2023, at the age of 72.
