= 2023 Tel Aviv car-ramming =

Car-ramming incident

- Location: Charles Clore Park, Tel Aviv, Israel
- Date: 7 April 2023
- Attack type: Vehicle-ramming attack (suspected)
- Deaths: 2 (including the driver)
- Injuries: 6

On 7 April 2023, a car-ramming incident suspected to be an intentional attack occurred off Kaufmann Street in Tel Aviv, Israel, killed a person and injured six others.

== Incident ==
Alessandro Parini, an Italian lawyer who died after being struck by the vehicle

The suspected car-ramming attack took place near Kaufmann Street. The driver's car veered onto an occupied sidewalk and continued for 150 meters before skidding and overturning on a lawn of the Charles Clore Park. The car struck seven people, killing Alessandro Parini, a 35-year-old lawyer visiting from Rome, and injuring two other Italians and four British citizens. The driver was then fatally shot by a police officer.

Alessandro Parini specialized in tax and public law and worked with the law firm, Police & Partners. He was admitted to the Italian bar in 2014 and in 2019 finalized his PhD from the University of Rome. In 2022 he received admission to bring cases to the Italian Supreme Court. He specialized in taxes, competition and electronic communications law.

== Driver ==
The driver was Yusef Abu Jaber, a 45-year-old Arab Israeli from Kafr Qassem and janitor at a local school. His brother said it was a car accident, not an attack, and that the family intends to ask for an investigation.

== Aftermath ==
The President of the Italian Republic Sergio Mattarella harshly condemned what he called a terrorist attack carried out against Italian citizens. The Italy's Prime Minister, Giorgia Meloni, also condemned what she called the "cowardly terrorist attack" expressing grief and condolences on the death of Alessandro Parini.

The President of Israel Isaac Herzog expressed his condolences to the President of the Italian Republic, as did Prime Minister Benjamin Netanyahu.

His coffin was returned for burial in Italy after a small ceremony at Ben Gurion Airport at which Italian Ambassador Sergio Barbanti and Foreign Ministry officials participated.
