= 2023 in Palestine =

- Decades: 2000s; 2010s; 2020s
- See also: History of Palestine; Timeline of Palestinian history; List of years in Palestine

Events in the year 2023 in Palestine.

== Incumbents ==
Photo	Post	Name
	President (PLO)	Mahmoud Abbas
	Prime Minister	Mohammad Shtayyeh

- Government of Palestine – Eighteenth government of Palestine

== Events ==
Ongoing — COVID-19 pandemic in the State of Palestine

=== January ===
- 1 January – Two Palestinians are killed and three more injured during confrontations with Israeli soldiers who storm Kafr Dan to demolish the homes of two Palestinians killed in a shootout at a checkpoint in Jenin, in the occupied West Bank several months ago.
- 12 January – A Palestinian man opens fire on Israeli soldiers in Qalandia, West Bank, and is shot dead. In a separate incident, a Palestinian man is killed by Israeli soldiers after stabbing to death an Israeli settler at a farm.
- 14 January – Two Palestinian Islamic Jihad members are killed by Israeli soldiers during a raid in Jaba, West Bank.
- 26 January – 2023 Jenin killings: At least nine Palestinians are killed and 16 more injured during a raid by Israeli soldiers in Jenin, and the ensuing gunfight with the Palestinian Islamic Jihad.
- 27 January – 2023 Neve Yaakov shooting: Seven people are killed in a mass shooting by a Palestinian man in the Israeli settlement of Neve Yaakov, in occupied East Jerusalem. The man is shot and killed by Israeli police after attempting to flee. In response to rockets fired by Palestinian militants into southern Israel, Israeli Air Force jets launch airstrikes on an underground rocket manufacturing site and a military base used by Hamas in the Gaza Strip.
- 28 January – A Palestinian civilian home is set on fire by Israeli settlers. The occupants were not there at the time of the attack.
- 29 January – An 18-year-old Palestinian man is shot and killed by a group of Israeli settlers near the settlement of Kedumim, in the occupied West Bank. The Israeli military claim the man was armed, though Wafa reports that the circumstances around the killing are unclear.

=== February ===
- 6 February – Five Palestinians are killed and three more injured during a raid by Israeli soldiers and subsequent gunbattle at a refugee camp near Jericho, in the occupied West Bank.
- 22 February – 2023 Nablus clash: Israeli troops conducting a counterterrorism operation clash with Palestinians in Nablus, West Bank, killing nine Palestinians and injuring 97 others, according to the Palestinian Health Ministry.
- 26 February – 2023 Huwara shooting: A Palestinian gunman shoots and kills two Israelis in Huwara, Nablus Governorate, West Bank. During revenge attacks by Israelis, a Palestinian is shot and killed and 98 others are injured, many of whom during arson attacks.
- 28 February – An Israeli-American man is killed during a drive-by shooting at a highway in the city of Jericho, in the West Bank.

=== March ===
- 6 March – Five Palestinians are injured by Israeli settlers attacking a family on a street in Huwara, in the West Bank. At least twenty-five Palestinians are injured by tear gas fired by Israeli soldiers during the attack.
- 7 March – At least six members of the Jenin Brigades are killed by Israeli soldiers during a raid in Jenin, West Bank. Among those killed is the killer of two Israeli settlers last month.
- 9 March – Three Palestinian fighters are killed by Israeli special units during a shootout in Jenin.
- 10 March – A Palestinian man is shot dead by an Israeli settler near a farm in Karnei Shomron, in the West Bank. The Israel Defense Forces (IDF) claims that the Palestinian man was armed at the time.
- 12 March – Israeli soldiers kill three Palestinian gunmen near Nablus, West Bank, after coming under fire.
- 16 March – Two militants including Islamic Jihad and Hamas commanders and two civilians are killed and five others are injured during a raid by Israeli security forces in the Jenin refugee camp, in the West Bank.

=== April ===
- 3 April – A Lions' Den militant and a Fatah member are killed during a raid by Israeli soldiers in Nablus, in the occupied West Bank. Two other Palestinians are arrested and dozens more are hospitalized due to tear gas.
- 7 April – Two British-Israeli women are killed and their mother is injured in a drive-by shooting at their vehicle near the Hamra settlement in the West Bank.
- 10 April – A 15-year-old Palestinian boy is killed by Israeli soldiers in Jericho.
- 11 April – A Palestinian Authority member and another Palestinian man are killed by Israeli soldiers in Elon Moreh, in the occupied West Bank.

=== May ===
- 4 May – The Israel Security Agency kills three Palestinian men in Nablus, West Bank. The men were allegedly responsible for the murders of a mother and her two daughters in April in Efrat, West Bank.
- 6 May – Two Palestinian men, members of the Tul Karm Battalion, are killed during a raid by the Israel Defense Forces in Tulkarm in the West Bank.
- 9 May – The Israeli Air Force launches airstrikes in the Gaza Strip, killing three senior Palestinian Islamic Jihad leaders and at least ten civilians, including four children. At least another 20 people are injured in the attack, which the Palestinian Authority calls a "horrific massacre". Israeli Defense Minister Yoav Gallant declares a "special situation" in the home front with border crossings and schools closed, and gatherings of over 10 people banned in open places.
- 10 May –
  - Israel launches an airstrike in the Gaza Strip, killing seven people, including four members of the Marxist–Leninist PFLP. In another raid, two Islamic Jihad Movement militants are killed by Israeli security forces in Qabatiya, in the occupied West Bank.
  - Palestinian militants fire more than 260 rockets into Israel from Gaza in response to yesterday's airstrikes. Most of the rockets are intercepted by the Iron Dome.
- 11 May – An Israeli airstrike kills two commanders of Islamic Jihad. Meanwhile, the total death toll of the Israeli airstrikes in Gaza of the past two days increases to 26. A rocket is launched from Gaza to Rehovot, killing a person and wounding five more.
- 30 May – An Israeli settler is shot and killed by Al Aqsa Martyrs Brigade gunmen in the West Bank.

=== June ===
- 19 June – 2023 Eli shooting: Four Palestinians are killed and 45 others are wounded during an IDF raid in the Jenin refugee camp.
- 20 June – Hamas kill four Israelis and injure four others in a mass shooting at a restaurant and a petrol station near the Israeli settlement of Eli in the occupied West Bank. The two gunmen are killed by a civilian and a soldier.
- 21 June –
  - A Palestinian man is killed and several others are injured during a rampage by Israeli settlers in Turmus Ayya.
  - An Israeli drone conducts the first West Bank airstrike since 2005, targeting a car, and killing two PIJ members and an Al-Aqsa Martyrs' Brigades member.

=== July ===
- 3 July – July 2023 Jenin incursion: Eight Palestinians are killed and more than 50 injured after Israeli soldiers storm Jenin in the West Bank.
- 4 July – The Israeli military's assault in Jenin, Palestine, continues for a second day, killing four more Palestinians and bringing the death toll to 12, with more than 120 others injured.
- 5 July – Israel ends 2-day West Bank offensive that left 13 dead, more than 100 injured, and property destroyed.
- 7 July – Israeli soldiers shoot dead two Popular Front for the Liberation of Palestine militants during a raid at a house in Nablus in the occupied West Bank.
- 25 July – Three Hamas members are killed by Israeli soldiers in the Nablus neighborhood of al-Tur, in the occupied West Bank.

=== August ===
- 1 August – A Palestinian man is shot and killed by Israeli security forces after opening fire on Israelis in the settlement of Ma'ale Adumim in the occupied West Bank.
- 15 August – Israeli security forces shoot two Palestinians in a raid in Jericho in the occupied West Bank.

=== September ===
- 1 September – A Palestinian man is killed and others are injured, a building is destroyed and ambulances are prevented to reach the scene and shot at, during a raid by Israeli soldiers in Aqabah, in the occupied West Bank.
- 5 September – Israeli security forces kill two Palestinians, destroys even more infrastructure of Nur Shams camp, Tulkarem in a large raid.

=== October ===
- 7 October – Gaza war begins:
  - Hamas launches over 3,500 rockets towards Israel and infiltrates its Southern District. Israel retaliates with strikes in the Gaza Strip.
    - Battle of Re'im:
      - Hamas briefly seizes control of the IDF's 143rd "Gaza" Division headquarters in Re'im, Eshkol Regional Council, before Israeli troops retake it. Several Israeli soldiers are reportedly captured and taken to the Gaza Strip.
    - Battle of Sderot:
      - At least twenty Israeli police officers are killed by Hamas inside the police headquarters of Sderot after the building is seized.
    - Fighting and hostage-taking in Be'eri and Ofakim
      - Hamas forces enter the Southern Israeli towns of Be'eri and Ofakim with heavy fighting underway.
  - Hamas leader Mohammed Deif announces the start of Operation Al-Aqsa Flood. Israel declares a state of war in response and asks Palestinians to leave the Gaza Strip.
  - At least 232 Palestinians are killed and over 1,600 are injured in the Gaza Strip by airstrikes launched by Israel. At least 300 Israelis are killed and hundreds more are injured by missile attacks and shootings.
  - Israeli major general Nimrod Aloni, commander of the Depth Corps, is captured by Hamas. Dozens of Israeli civilians are also captured and taken to the Gaza Strip.
    - 8 October –
      - Israel's Security Cabinet says it has approved a military operation against Hamas and Palestinian Islamic Jihad in the Gaza Strip.
      - The death toll in Palestine rises to 370 with over 2,200 wounded. The death toll in Israel rises to over 750 with over 2,000 wounded. Dozens of Israelis are also taken to Gaza.
      - October 2023 Hezbollah strike: Hezbollah in southern Lebanon open fire at Israeli positions in Shebaa Farms with artillery and guided rockets. Israel responds with airstrikes on Hezbollah artillery positions.
      - Battle of Sderot: Hamas forces and the IDF clash for a second day in Sderot.
      - Re'im music festival massacre: More than 260 bodies are found in Re'im, Southern Israel, after Hamas attacked a trance music festival. Foreign nationals are among those killed in the massacre.
      - Israeli ambassador to the United States Michael Herzog says that Americans have been taken hostage by Hamas in Gaza.
    - 9 October –
      - The death toll from the Israeli airstrikes in the Gaza Strip increases to 560 people, with more than 2,900 others injured.
      - The death toll in Israel climbs to 800 with over 2,500 wounded, while two militants from Lebanon are killed during a shootout at the border between the two countries.
      - The imposition of a total blockade of the Gaza Strip, including food and fuel items, is announced by Israel.
      - Israel launches airstrikes against the Jabalia Camp in the Gaza Strip, killing more than 50 people.
      - In Beita, Nablus, a Palestinian is shot by Israeli soldiers. Earlier in the day, one Palestinian was killed by Israeli forces in Hebron, West Bank, one in Jericho, and two in Ramallah.
      - In Duma, Nablus, a Palestinian is shot by Israeli soldiers, as Israeli settlers torch cars and attack farmers.
      - In Einabus, West Bank, two Palestinians are shot by Israeli soldiers. Twelve people are evacuated for teargas inhalation, with Israeli forces attempting to stop the evacuation.
      - At least 22 members of a Palestinian family, including seven children, are killed in an Israeli air strike in Khan Younis, Gaza Strip. Six members of the family remain trapped under the rubble of the destroyed house.
      - The UN Security Council meets in an emergency session but fail to achieve the unanimity needed for a joint statement.
      - Israeli air attacks and shelling aimed at houses and apartment buildings displace at least 123,538 Palestinians in Gaza, according to the UN Office for Humanitarian Affairs.
      - Al-Shati Camp airstrike: Israel launches airstrikes on the Al-Shati refugee camp in the Gaza Strip, resulting in civilian casualties.
      - Jabalia camp market airstrike: Israel launches airstrikes on a market in the Jabalia Camp in the Gaza Strip, killing more than 60 civilians and injuring 120 others.
- 10 October –
  - Israeli airstrikes hit near the Rafah crossing between Gaza and Egypt, after an Israeli official advised Palestinians to leave the Gaza Strip through the border crossing. (Al Jazeera)
  - The UN High Commissioner for Human Rights condemns Israel's decision to order a blockade on Gaza, including a ban on food and water, saying the action is in violation of international law. (The Times of Israel)
  - The World Health Organization calls for a humanitarian corridor into Gaza, after thirteen health facilities are hit in Israeli attacks. (AFP via Barron's)
  - The UN Palestine Humanitarian Office says four schools and eight healthcare facilities in Gaza sustained damage and expected a severe shortage of drinking water due to the Israeli blockade. (Al Jazeera)
  - The United Nations Agency for Palestine (UNRWA) says 187,518 people, nearly a tenth of Gaza's population, have fled their home and are sheltering in 83 UNRWA schools, with bread being provided by the World Food Programme. (Al Arabiya)
  - At least six Palestinian journalists have been killed amid Israel's ongoing shelling of the Gaza strip. Funerals for two of the journalists are held at a hospital in Gaza City. (Al Jazeera)
  - The death toll from the Israeli airstrikes in the Gaza Strip increases to 770 people, with more than 4,000 wounded. At least another 18 people were killed and 100 injured in the West Bank. The Israeli death toll passes 1,000. (Al Arabiya) (Telegraph)
  - Israeli airstrikes on Gaza hit residential buildings, large tower blocks, as well as schools and UN buildings, resulting in civilian casualties. The UN High Commissioner for Human Rights condemns the actions, saying they are in violation of international law. (Reuters)
  - Israeli airstrikes destroy a Palestinian Telecommunications Company building in Gaza city, causing widespread outage of communications and internet. (Anadolu)
  - An Israeli soldier and two Palestinian Islamic Jihad militants are killed in clashes on the border with Lebanon. (BBC News)
  - An Israeli airstrike kills Jawad Abu Shammala and Zakaria Abu Maamar, two members in Hamas political office. (AFP via Al Arabiya)
  - Aftermath of the Kfar Aza massacre revealed. (The Times of Israel)
- 11 October –
  - The Palestine Liberation Organization says Israel refused a request to bring food and medical supplies into the Gaza Strip. Israel also threatens a humanitarian convoy from Egypt carrying medical supplies into Gaza with an air strike.
  - Israeli air strikes destroy the Al-Fakhoora House of the Education Above All Foundation in Gaza. Israeli airstrikes have also hit the Islamic University of Gaza.
  - Dozens of Israeli fighter jets carry out more than 200 airstrikes overnight on the Al-Furqan neighborhood in Gaza City.
  - Israeli airstrikes destroy more than 22,600 residential units, 10 health facilities and damage 48 schools as Hamas continues to fire rockets from civilian areas in violation of international law. At least 260 children have been killed by Israeli attacks on Gaza.
  - The UN Palestine Agency says Israeli airstrikes have killed nine of its staff in Gaza.
  - At least 30 people are killed in an Israeli air strike on a law expert's house when he was visiting his family in central Gaza City.
  - The Rimal and al-Karama neighbourhoods are destroyed by Israeli airstrikes, with eight 12-storey towers destroyed.
  - At least 16 Palestinians have been killed in an Israeli air raid on the southern city of Khan Younis.
  - At least three Palestinians are killed and nine wounded by Israeli soldiers in the Qusra, south of Nablus in the West Bank.
  - The Palestinian Red Crescent says four of its paramedics have been killed in Israeli air attacks.
  - At least 1,055 Palestinians have been killed in Israel's air attacks and 5,184 wounded. At least 1,300 people in Israel have been killed and 2,800 wounded, according to the Israeli army.
- 12 October –
  - The death toll in Gaza rises to 1,200, while the number of injuries has reached about 5,600. The death toll in Israel has reached 1,400.
  - At least 51 people are killed and 281 injured in Israeli air strikes on several areas of Gaza, including Al Zaytoun, Al Nafaq, Sabra, Tal Al Hawa and Khan Younis.
  - Three of five water plants in Gaza are out of service due to the Israeli bombings and lack of fuel, according to the International Committee of Red Cross.
  - The United Nations says that 338,934 Palestinians have been displaced in Gaza, as Israel continues to conduct bombing raids.
  - United Nations secretary-general António Guterres says life-saving supplies, including food, fuel and water, must be allowed into Gaza.
  - Israeli Energy Minister Israel Katz says the blockade of Gaza will not end until all Israeli hostages are released by Hamas.
  - The Norwegian Refugee Council calls for humanitarian corridors to be established to allow the safe passage of personnel and relief supplies into Gaza.
  - The Ministry of Foreign Affairs of Egypt denied rumors that the Rafah Border Crossing was closed, asserting that the crossing remains operational and has not been closed since the onset of the crisis and called upon the international community willing to offer humanitarian aid to the Palestinians to route their aid to El Arish International Airport.
- 13 October –
  - The Israel Defense Forces notifies the United Nations that all the 1.1 million Palestinians living north of Wadi Gaza in the Gaza Strip, have been ordered to relocate to Southern Gaza within 24 hours, ahead of an expected ground invasion.
  - The Israeli Air Force begins dropping leaflets over Gaza City ordering residents to evacuate the city immediately.
  - Hamas tells Palestinians to remain in their houses and not flee to Southern Gaza, following Israel's orders to flee.
  - The United Kingdom begins evacuating British citizens from Israel.
  - At a press conference, Israeli Defense Minister Yoav Gallant says the main goal of the coming military operation will be to "topple Hamas rule in Gaza".
  - Israeli soldiers open fire against protestors in the occupied West Bank, killing eleven people and injuring 124 more.
  - Human Rights Watch accuses the IDF of using white phosphorus munitions in its military operation in the Gaza area and Lebanon, saying it puts civilians at risk of serious and long-term injuries.
  - Hamas says that 13 hostages, including foreigners, have been killed in Israeli airstrikes.
  - Israeli troops conduct "localized raids" into Gaza in an attempt to locate Hamas-held hostages.
- 14 October –
  - 2023 attacks on Palestinians evacuating Gaza City: 70 people have been killed in attacks on convoys evacuating Gaza City, according to Hamas.
  - At least 27 Palestinians are killed by Israeli airstrikes in Jabaliya in the Gaza Strip.
  - The UN Office for the Coordination of Humanitarian Affairs says that more than 50,000 pregnant women and newborn babies in Gaza do not have access to essential medical care.
  - The UN Palestine agency says that its shelters in Gaza are no longer safe and also warns that there is a shortage of water in Gaza.
  - October 2023 Jenin incursion: Israeli forces storm Jenin in the West Bank.
  - At least 15 hospitals are damaged by Israeli shelling and airstrikes, with two currently inoperable. 28 medical staff are killed and 23 ambulances are damaged or destroyed by Israeli airstrikes.
  - At least 2,268 Palestinians have been killed and 8,700 others injured in Israeli airstrikes on Gaza. At least 1,300 Israelis have been killed and at least 3,400 others are injured.
  - Amnesty International says that they have verified images of Israeli forces near Sderot using white phosphorus-based rounds.
  - Palestine's United Nations envoy says that Palestinians are in danger of mass ethnic cleansing.
  - The Israel Defense Forces announce that airstrikes in the Gaza Strip have killed Murad Abu Murad, the head of Hamas's air operations and Ali Qadi, a top Hamas commander, both of whom were involved in the October 7 invasion of Israel.
  - New York Times reports Israeli officers say its soldiers are ordered to "capture Gaza City" and destroy the current leadership, in Israeli's first attempt to capture land since 2008.
- 15 October –
  - An estimated one million Gazans have been displaced, according to the United Nations Palestinian agency, as aid groups describe the situation in the besieged enclave as "catastrophic".
  - The Palestinian Ministry of Health says that about 70 percent of people in Gaza do not have access to health services, although the World Health Organization has been able to deliver medical supplies for 2,000 patients. The ministry also says that at least 50 families in the Gaza Strip have had all of their family members killed by Israeli shelling and air strikes.
  - Human Rights Watch confirms that Israel has used white phosphorus in Gaza and Lebanon.
  - Israel conducts military operations in Ramallah in the West Bank, arresting more than 50 people.
  - The Israel Defense Forces kill senior Hamas commander Billal Al Kedra in an airstrike in Khan Yunis.
  - The heads of the Arab League and the African Union release a joint statement stating that Israel's planned ground invasion of Gaza "could lead to a genocide of unprecedented proportions".
  - Egyptian President Abdel Fattah el-Sisi says that Israel's reaction to Hamas's attack "went beyond self-defence and amounted to collective punishment".
  - Venezuelan President Nicolas Maduro announces the provision of 30 tonnes of humanitarian aid to Gaza.
- 16 October –
  - The World Health Organization said 21 hospitals in Gaza have been ordered to evacuate by Israel, warning this "may amount to a violation of international humanitarian law".
  - The chief of the UN Palestine agency announces it can no longer deliver assistance to the hundreds of thousands of people in need in Gaza.
  - UN Palestine agency announces that men claiming to be from Hamas stole fuel and medicine from their offices in Gaza.
  - At least four hospitals in northern Gaza are no longer functioning following Israeli bombardments, according to the United Nations.
  - The World Health Organization announces there is only 24 hours of water, electricity and fuel left in Gaza.
  - Palestinian protesters rally in the streets of several cities across the West Bank calling for an end to Israeli attacks on Gaza.
  - Medical Aid for Palestinians says hospitals in Gaza are facing a "catastrophic" shortage of medical supplies, amid Israel's "total blockade".
  - More than 400,000 Palestinians are sheltering in UN schools and buildings across the Gaza Strip, the global body says. Fourteen UNRWA personnel have been killed in Israeli airstrikes.
  - Hamas releases the first video of a hostage on Telegram since the war started, a 21-year-old Israeli woman from Shoham who was kidnapped during the Re'im music festival massacre. In the video, she claims to be receiving medical treatment by her captors.
  - At least six civilians are killed and eight injured in airstrikes targeting the home of an extended family west of Khan Younis, Gaza.
  - At least seven people are killed, including five emergency workers, following Israeli airstrikes on two civil defense facilities in the eastern and southern Gaza City.
  - The bodies of more than 1,000 people are trapped under the rubble of buildings in Gaza destroyed by Israeli air strikes, prompting concern of humanitarian and environmental crises.
  - Hamas forces launch a barrage of missiles at the two largest Israeli cities, Tel Aviv and Jerusalem, saying it was in response to Israel's "targeting of civilians".
  - Israeli military forces carry out raids and make dozens of arrests in multiple areas in the West Bank, including East Jerusalem, Nablus, Bethlehem, Hebron and the Aqabat Jabr camp in Jericho.
  - Several dozen raids are conducted by Israeli forces in the West Bank, detaining about 600 people. Most are held without charges under "administrative detention", where the individuals are not told the reasons for their arrest.
- 17 October –
  - Israel bombed areas of southern Gaza, after Israel ordered northern Gazans to relocate south.
  - Al-Ahli Arab Hospital explosion: Around 500 people are killed by an explosion at the Al-Ahli Arab Hospital in Gaza City. Hamas spokespersons blame an Israeli airstrike, while an IDF investigation shows explosion was caused by failed Hamas rocket launch.
    - Palestinian President Mahmoud Abbas declares three days of mourning in Palestinian territories following the hospital bombing.
  - October 2023 UNRWA school airstrike: An Israeli airstrike hits a United Nations school inside a refugee camp, killing six people.
  - The UN High Commissioner for Human Rights says that Israel's blockade of Gaza and its evacuation order in northern Gaza may amount to a forcible transfer of civilians, which is a violation of international law.
  - The World Health Organization says that 2,800 people have died and 11,000 have been injured in Gaza since Israeli air strikes began, with about half of those being women and children.
  - The World Health Organization says that there have been 51 attacks against healthcare facilities in Gaza, killing 15 health workers and injuring 27 others, and that "we have seen consistent attacks on healthcare in the occupied Palestinian territory".
  - Hamas announces that Ayman Nofal, a member of the general military council and commander of the central command in the Al-Qassam Brigades, was killed in an Israeli airstrike.
- 18 October –
  - The United States vetoes a United Nations Security Council resolution that would have called for a humanitarian pause in Gaza. Twelve other countries voted in favour of the resolution while two abstained.
  - UN Under-Secretary-General Martin Griffiths reiterates that there are rules of war after the US vetoed humanitarian pauses in the conflict.
  - Turkish President Recep Tayyip Erdogan condemns the UNSC for failing to pass a resolution for a humanitarian pause, adding that efforts to deescalate the conflict have been hindered by the collective punishment of Palestinians through airstrikes and the deployment of US aircraft carriers to the region.
  - October 19 – Dozens of rockets are fired at the northern Israeli cities of Nahariya and Kiryat Shmona from southern Lebanon, injuring at least three civilians. Hamas says its cells in Lebanon were responsible for the rocket attacks. Israel responds with airstrikes on Hezbollah positions.
  - Five Palestinians are killed in clashes with the Israeli military at the Nur Shams refugee camp in Tulkarm, West Bank.
- 19 October –
  - A member of the Security Cabinet of Israel says that the Israel Defense Forces has been given the "green light" to enter the Gaza Strip.
  - Five Palestinians are killed in clashes with the Israeli military at the Nur Shams refugee camp in Tulkarm in the West Bank.
- 20 October –
  - Colombian President Gustavo Petro announces the establishment of an embassy to the State of Palestine in Ramallah, West Bank, and announces humanitarian aid to the Gaza Strip amidst the ongoing Gaza war.
  - Hamas releases two American hostages following a mediation by Egypt and Qatar.
- 21 October –
  - The Rafah Border Crossing on the Egypt–Gaza border opens for the first time since the war began, allowing humanitarian aid trucks to enter.
- 22 October –
  - Palestinian journalist Rushdi Sarraj is killed in an Israeli attack on his home in Gaza.
  - At least 55 people are killed in overnight raids on the Gaza Strip by Israel.
  - The United Nations says the lives of at least 120 newborn babies in incubators in Gaza's hospitals are at risk.
  - The number of mosques destroyed in the Gaza Strip rises to 31.
  - An Israeli tank accidentally hits an Egyptian position near the border with Gaza. Several Egyptian border guards sustained injuries from fragments of a shell.
  - At least 300 Palestinians are placed under administrative detention or have had detention orders renewed, allowing Israel to hold them without charge indefinitely under secret evidence.
  - Paddy Cosgrave, a co-founder of the European tech conference Web Summit, steps down after opposition over public statements on Israel, saying "War crimes are war crimes even when committed by allies, and should be called out for what they are.
- 23 October –
  - Omar Daraghmeh, a senior Hamas official, dies while in Israeli prison, with Hamas spokespeople saying it was an assassination. He was arrested in the West Bank by the Israel Defense Forces, along with his son.
  - The Indonesian Hospital, the largest in northern Gaza, loses power after running out of fuel.
  - Hamas releases two Israeli hostages following mediation by Qatar and Egypt. The pair were taken to the Rafah border crossing between Gaza and Egypt.
  - Israeli airstrikes kill at least 436 Palestinians, including women and children, in northern Gaza's Al-Shati refugee camp as well as Khan Younis.
  - Israeli forces launch night raids in the West Bank, with heavily armed troops backed by armored vehicles seen in at least two areas.
  - Qatar's Emir Tamim Bin Hamad Al Thani has warned the escalation of fighting in Gaza poses a threat to the region and the world. He asserted Israel should not be given a "green light for unconditional killing".
- 24 October –
  - The World Health Organization says medicine and health supplies have not been delivered to three hospitals in northern Gaza. Nearly two-thirds of hospitals in Gaza are now non-functional.
  - The UN's agency for Palestinian refugees says the number of aid trucks so far is "a trickle in the face of the immense needs of people" and is calling for an "unimpeded and continuous flow of humanitarian assistance and medical assistance to continue coming into Gaza".
  - UN Secretary-General António Guterres calls for an immediate humanitarian ceasefire in Gaza, saying there are clear violations of international humanitarian law in Gaza. He also pushed for more humanitarian relief to be allowed into the enclave.
  - Human Rights Watch has criticized Israel for "deliberately deepening the suffering of civilians in Gaza" by refusing to allow fuel shipment into the enclave and to restore the flow of water.
  - Israel launches airstrikes near the Red Crescent headquarters and Al-Amal Hospital in Khan Younis, where more than 4,000 displaced Palestinians are taking shelter.
  - UN Secretary-General António Guterres calls for an immediate humanitarian ceasefire in Gaza, saying that there are clear violations of international humanitarian law. Guterres also called for more humanitarian relief to be allowed into the enclave.
  - Human Rights Watch criticizes Israel for "deliberately deepening the suffering of civilians in Gaza" by refusing to allow shipments of fuel into the enclave and for not restoring the supply of water.
- 25 October –
  - The Gaza Health Ministry says that at least 704 people have died in the past day. The UN relief agency says this was "the highest fatality toll reported in a single day".
  - At least 16 people are killed and several others injured following Israeli airstrikes across Gaza residential areas in Jabalia, Tal al-Hawa, Khan Younis and the Nuseirat refugee camp.
  - At least 11 people are arrested in Hebron in the West Bank following an Israeli raid. Israeli troops stormed several villages including al-Burj and al-Majd.
  - The UN Security Council holds an open debate, with many of the nearly 90 countries on the speakers' list calling for a ceasefire amid the mounting death toll in Gaza.
  - Draft resolutions calling for a ceasefire are being considered by both the UN Security Council and the UN General Assembly.
  - Turkish President Recep Tayyip Erdoğan calls for an immediate ceasefire in Gaza, and says Hamas is "not a terrorist organization, it is a liberation group, mujahideen waging a battle to protect its lands and people".
  - US legal organization Palestine Legal says it has responded to more than 260 requests for assistance in the past two weeks, ranging from job losses to the cancellation of classes.
  - In a televised address to the nation, Israeli Prime Minister Benjamin Netanyahu says that he has set the date for a ground invasion of the Gaza Strip with the main goals of the operation being to destroy Hamas and to rescue hostages.
- 26 October –
  - An Israeli air raid kills the wife, son, daughter and infant grandson of Al Jazeera Arabic's Gaza bureau chief Wael Dahdouh in central Gaza after they evacuated to the area following warnings from Israel.
  - Oxfam says Israel is using starvation as a "weapon of war" as the blockade of Gaza continues.
  - The Israel and Palestine director at Human Rights Watch confirms the Palestinian death toll provided by the Health Ministry is reliable, after US President Joe Biden questioned the number of people killed.
  - Israel continues raids and arrests in the West Bank, where Palestinian authorities say more than 1,200 people have been detained.
  - UNICEF has condemned the nearly 3,000 child casualties in Gaza, saying it is a "growing stain on our collective conscience, the rate of death and injuries of children simply staggering"
  - Another three UNRWA staff members have been killed, bringing the total to 38. Around 219 educational facilities have been hit, including at least 29 UNRWA schools.
  - About 200,000 housing units have been completely and partially destroyed in Gaza, representing 45 percent of all the housing in the enclave.
  - In a joint statement, the foreign ministers of Bahrain, Egypt, Jordan, Kuwait, Morocco Oman, Qatar, Saudi Arabia and the United Arab Emirates condemned the forced displacement and collective punishment in Gaza.
  - Amnesty International issues a statement calling for an immediate ceasefire to stop the increasing death toll and ensure crucial aid reaches Gaza amid an "unprecedented humanitarian catastrophe".
  - The Israel and Palestine director at Human Rights Watch confirms the Palestinian death toll provided by the Health Ministry is reliable, after US President Joe Biden questioned the number of people killed.
  - IDF tanks enter northern Gaza in a "targeted raid", saying it was in preparation for the "next stages of combat". No Israeli military casualties are reported.
  - The death toll in Gaza increases to more than 7,000 people. An estimated 1.4 million people are internally displaced.
  - A total of 101 medical personnel have been killed by Israeli attacks, with 100 more wounded. 50 ambulances have been attacked, half of which are out of service. Hospitals are operating at more than 150 percent of their capacity, with around 166 unsafe births per day.
- 27 October –
  - At least 33 Palestinians are killed and several wounded, following Israeli airstrikes on at least three residential neighbourhoods in Gaza City.
  - At least 10 Palestinians are killed, including journalist Yasser Abu Namous and his mother, in a series of airstrikes carried out by Israeli forces in southern Gaza.
  - A number of people are killed and injured in an Israeli airstrike on the Al-Shati refugee camp, destroying residential buildings and the nearby White Mosque.
  - The Palestinian Red Crescent has said that its medics were shot at by Israeli forces as they treated an injured person in Tubas, West Bank.
  - Four people are killed after a pre-dawn raid by Israeli forces in the West Bank. At least 19 people have been arrested.
  - Hamas reports that Israel has disrupted most communication and Internet services in the Gaza Strip.
  - The Israel Defense Forces enter the Gaza Strip from multiple directions with infantry and tanks crossing the border. Heavy clashes are reportedly underway.
  - Israeli troops advance on the city of Beit Hanoun.
- 28 October –
  - Thousands of Gazan workers employed in Israel go missing amid a campaign of mass arrests. Human rights groups and trade unions say they have been illegally detained in military facilities in the West Bank, following the revocation of their work permits.
  - UN agencies say they are unable to contact staff in Gaza amid the near-total communications blackout and call for civilians to be protected.
  - Human Rights Watch says that the near-total communication blackout "risks providing cover for mass atrocities and contributing to impunity for human rights violations" and will make it more difficult to "obtain critical information and evidence about human rights violations and war crimes being committed, and to hear directly from those experiencing the violations".
  - Israeli airstrikes destroy hundreds of buildings and damage thousands of others in the Gaza Strip overnight, the civil defense service in Gaza said.
  - Israeli warplanes bombed 150 underground targets in northern Gaza, including tunnels and underground infrastructure.
  - SpaceX chief Elon Musk announces that Starlink services will be offered in the Gaza Strip to "internationally recognized aid organizations".
  - The UN General Assembly passes a resolution with a vote of 120–14, with 45 abstentions, calling for an immediate humanitarian truce in Gaza, despite US and Israeli opposition.
  - The Egyptian foreign ministry has warned of the "humanitarian and security repercussions of the Israeli ground attack" on Gaza, saying "we hold the Israeli government responsible for violating the United Nations General Assembly resolution for an immediate ceasefire and implementing a humanitarian truce".
  - The International Organization for Migration has renewed its call for a ceasefire, saying "civilians must be protected. There are no winners in war. The most vulnerable pay the heaviest toll"
  - Turkish President Recep Tayyip Erdoğan has called on Israel to "immediately come out of its state of madness and stop its attacks" on the Gaza Strip, saying they have "targeted women, children and innocent civilians, deepening the humanitarian crisis".
  - Save the Children says children will "bear the brunt" of Israel's intensified attacks on the Gaza Strip, saying in the event of a full ground incursion, more than one million children's lives, nearly half of the 2.3 million population of Gaza, will be affected.
  - Thousands of Palestinians have performed the Fajr prayer and staged demonstrations in Nablus, Tulkarem, Jenin and Tubas in the West Bank in a show of support for Gaza.
  - Israeli bombardment take place in the vicinities of the Al-Shifa Hospital and Indonesia Hospital while dozens of residents were at the facilities.
- 29 October –
  - Impeding the delivery of aid to Gaza's residents may be considered a crime within the jurisdiction of the International Criminal Court, its top prosecutor has said.
  - More children have been killed in Gaza during the war, than the total killed in conflicts around the world since 2019, Save the Children has said. At least 3,324 children have been killed in Gaza, while 36 have died in the West Bank.
  - Israel increases air attacks close to Al-Quds Hospital in Gaza City after ordering the Palestinian Red Crescent to immediately evacuate the Hospital. The World Health Organization says that "it's impossible to evacuate hospitals full of patients without endangering their lives".
  - Waves of bombardments hit Al-Shati refugee camp, Shujaiya and Zeitoun in Gaza.
  - At least 8,005 Palestinians have been killed in Gaza since October 7. More than 1,400 people have been killed in Israel.
  - Israel's ambassador to the United Nations, Gilad Erdan, calls on countries to cease funding the body after the UN General Assembly passed a non-binding resolution calling for an immediate ceasefire in Gaza.
  - Israeli Prime Minister Benjamin Netanyahu says the war will be "long and difficult", with Israel intensifying its aerial raids and progressing to the "next phase" of operations.
  - The Legal Center for Arab Minority Rights in Israel demands that Israel's government cancel emergency regulations extending the period which detainees suspected of "security offences" can be denied access to a lawyer.
- 30 October –
  - Heavy clashes are reported as IDF tanks reach the outskirts of Gaza City.
  - Israeli troops block Salah al-Din Road, the main highway in the Gaza Strip.
  - Israel announces that its forces rescued an IDF private who was taken hostage by Hamas during an overnight operation involving its intelligence agency Shin Bet.
  - Israeli prime minister Benjamin Netanyahu dismisses calls for a ceasefire in the war with Hamas, stating that Israel will continue its military operations.
- 31 October –
  - Jabalia refugee camp airstrikes: More than 50 people are killed and 150 more injured during an airstrike against the Jabalia refugee camp in the Gaza Strip, with the camp reported completely destroyed.
  - Gaza's Hamas-controlled health ministry reports Israeli airstrikes continue to target hospitals and medical centers, intentionally hitting medical institutions. Fifty-seven institutions have been hit, while thirty-two are out of service because of being targeted or lack of fuel.
  - An immediate humanitarian ceasefire is "absolutely imperative" in Gaza, said the UN human rights office, adding that "colleagues across the UN are talking about the need".
  - The Patriarchate of Jerusalem has blamed Israel for the bombing of its cultural centre, saying the attack "represents a stark embodiment of Israel's unwarranted determination to destroy the civil infrastructure and social service centres, as well as shelters for civilians".
  - The World Health Organization warns that Gaza is on the brink of a "public health catastrophe" due to overcrowding, widespread displacement, and severe damage to water and sanitation facilities, with only five percent of the normal water supplies accessible.
  - UNICEF says at least 940 children have been reported missing in Gaza, adding infant dehydration is a growing threat, adding that "Gaza has become a graveyard of children".
  - The UN Children's Fund's executive director says that more than 420 children are being killed or injured in Gaza every day.
  - Israeli air raids target the vicinity of the European Hospital in southern Gaza. Meanwhile, the director of the Indonesia Hospital reported it was hit for the third time.
  - The Palestine Red Crescent Society reports continuous artillery and air strikes in the Tal al-Hawa in northern Gaza near al-Quds Hospital. The hospital currently shelters hundreds of patients and more than 12,000 displaced civilians.
  - The Palestinian Health Ministry says 8,525 Palestinians have been killed in Israeli air raids, including 3,542 children.
  - Sixty-four employees of the UN agency for Palestinian refugees have been killed during the war.
  - Israeli forces arrest 60 Palestinians in the West Bank, the Palestinian Prisoners Society said, adding that "arrests are accompanied with torture and abusive attacks, as well as collective punishment and destruction of property".
  - Australia expresses concern over growing attacks by residents of settlements against Palestinians in the occupied West Bank.
  - Jordanian Foreign Affairs Minister Ayman Safadi calls for an immediate stop to the "humanitarian catastrophe" in Gaza caused by Israeli bombardment and the implementation of international law, while stressing the necessity of humanitarian aid.

=== November ===
- 1 November –
  - About 500 people, including wounded Palestinians, foreigners and dual citizens of Palestine and a foreign country, are being evacuated from the Gaza Strip through the Rafah Border Crossing to Egypt, marking its first opening since the war began.
  - The Jabalia refugee camp in the Gaza Strip is hit by Israeli airstrike for the second consecutive day, with several more people being killed.
  - Iranian Foreign Affairs Minister Hossein Amir-Abdollahian warns of "harsh consequences" if Israel continues its invasion of the Gaza Strip.
- 2 November –
  - The UN Human Rights Office says Israeli attacks on the refugee camp may be "disproportionate attacks that could amount to war crimes".
  - UNICEF and United Nations Secretary-General António Guterres has described attacks on the Jabalia refugee camp as "horrific and appalling".
  - UNICEF estimates that more than 3,500 children have been killed during the war, saying "children have endured too much already, the killing and captivity of children must stop".
  - The Turkish-Palestinian Friendship Hospital, Gaza's only medical facility serving cancer patients, is forced to shut down after running out of fuel. Sixteen of the Gaza Strip's 35 hospitals and more than 50 of Gaza's 72 primary healthcare clinics are now out of service.
  - The Indonesia Hospital is forced to run on its backup generator after the main generator stalled after running out of fuel.
  - Craig Mokhiber, the UN human rights official who stepped down over concerns the UN was failing to act on a "textbook genocide", says that "usually the most difficult part of proving genocide is intent, but that this was not the case with Israeli leaders, who "explicitly and publicly stated their positions on the public record".
  - At least 8,805 Palestinians have been killed in Gaza since October 7. In addition, more than 1,400 Israelis have been killed in Israel.
  - Israel's agricultural sector is suffering "significant damage" due to an exodus of thousands of foreign workers. More than a quarter of about 30,000 foreign workers have left the country and about 20,000 Palestinian agricultural workers have not been allowed to enter Israel.
  - At least 60 people were detained overnight across the West Bank. The total number of Palestinians detained since the war started exceeds 1,800. About half of them are being held in administrative detention.
  - Two Palestinians are killed and six wounded in Israeli raids in Qalqilya and Ramallah in the West Bank.
  - Israeli troops and tanks continue to encircle Gaza City with heavy clashes reported on the city's outskirts. Hamas and Palestinian Islamic Jihad say they are using "hit-and-run attacks" from tunnels to halt the advance.
  - Eleven bakeries in Gaza have been destroyed in airstrikes during the war, according to the UN relief agency. Six of the destroyed bakeries were in Gaza City, two in Jabalia, two in the Middle Area and one in Khan Younis.
- 3 November –
  - Al-Shifa ambulance airstrike: Several people are killed and many more wounded during an Israeli airstrike against a convoy of ambulances carrying wounded people from the al-Shifa Hospital in the Gaza Strip to Rafah, Egypt.
  - At least 14 people are killed during an Israeli airstrike against civilians fleeing to southern Gaza.
- 5 November –
  - The Israel Defense Forces announce the complete encirclement of Gaza City and say that they have split the Gaza Strip in two after Israeli troops reach the coast.
  - The Royal Jordanian Air Force airdrops medical aid to a field hospital inside the Gaza Strip.
- 6 November –
  - An Israel Border Police officer, Israeli American Rose Lubin, is stabbed to death and another officer is wounded near the Old City of Jerusalem. Responding security forces shoot the Palestinian attacker dead.
  - South Africa recalls its ambassador to Israel in response to its invasion of the Gaza Strip, and accuses Israel of genocide in Gaza.
- 7 November –
  - At least eight people are killed and dozens wounded in Israeli attacks on the Nasser Medical Complex in Gaza City, which includes the Al-Nasser Children's hospital, suffering direct and indirect hits from Israeli missiles.
  - At least two Palestinians are killed and several others injured in separate Israeli air raids that hit the vicinity of Kamal Adwan Hospital in Beit Hanoun and Al-Quds Hospital in the Tal al-Hawa district of Gaza City.
  - Job losses in Gaza and the West Bank are costing Palestinians $16m a day, according to the UN's labour agency, with 182,000 jobs lost in Gaza, equivalent to 61 percent of total employment. A further 208,000 jobs were lost in the West Bank, equivalent to 24 percent of total employment.
  - Gaza's Interior Ministry announces that all bakeries in the Gaza City and North Gaza governorates have stopped operating due to systematic targeting and the lack of fuel and flour.
  - At least two Palestinians are killed and several others injured in separate Israeli airstrikes that hit the vicinity of Kamal Adwan Hospital in Beit Hanoun and Al-Quds Hospital in the Tal al-Hawa district of Gaza City.
  - UN monitors say only about 5000 Palestinians moved from northern to southern Gaza on Monday, saying that "entire families, including children, elderly people and persons with disabilities" could only make the journey by foot as roads had been heavily damaged.
  - At least eight people are killed after an Israeli airstrike hits a house in southern Gaza.
  - United Nations monitors say that only about 5,000 Palestinians have been evacuated from northern to southern Gaza on Monday, stating that "entire families, including children, elderly people and persons with disabilities" could only make the journey on foot as roads have been heavily damaged.
- 8 November –
  - Human Rights Watch says an Israeli airstrike on an ambulance outside Al-Shifa Hospital in Gaza should be investigated as a possible war crime, adding that it did not find evidence that the ambulance was being used for military purposes.
  - Gaza's Al-Shifa Hospital is hit with intense Israeli bombardment and flares. The hospital is housing tens of thousands of people sheltering from Israel's bombardment.
  - Sites near the Indonesia Hospital are hit with Israeli bombardment. Electricity at the hospital is expected to be cut off soon due to the short supply of fuel.
  - Israeli aircraft renew their bombardment of the Nuseirat refugee camp in central Gaza Strip, resulting in several deaths and injuries. A residence belonging to a local family is hit, with people still trapped under the rubble of the destroyed residential building.
  - Amnesty International says Israel has dramatically increased its use of detention without charges since the start of the war, while also turning a blind eye to cases of torture and degrading treatment in prisons.
  - Al-Shifa ambulance airstrike: Human Rights Watch says an Israeli airstrike on an ambulance outside Al-Shifa Hospital in Gaza should be investigated as a possible war crime, adding that it did not find evidence that the ambulance was being used for military purposes.
  - At least 4,237 Palestinian children have been killed in Gaza since the start of the war. An additional 1,350 children are reported as missing and most are presumed dead under the rubble of destroyed buildings in Gaza.
  - Gaza's Al-Shifa Hospital is hit with intense Israeli bombardment and flares. The hospital is housing tens of thousands of people sheltering from Israel's bombardment.
  - Four people are killed in an airstrike on a house in the Jabalia refugee camp located in the northernmost part of the Gaza Strip.
- 9 November –
  - At least 30 Palestinians are killed in Israeli bombardments overnight in the Jabalia refugee camp in north and Sabra in western Gaza.
  - Three human rights organisations, Al Haq, Al Mezan and the Palestinian Centre for Human Rights, have filed a lawsuit with the International Criminal Court calling for it to consider apartheid and genocide in its investigation of the situation in Palestine.
  - The heads of the UNRWA and the World Health Organization say that conditions at Al-Shifa hospital, Gaza's largest hospital, were "disastrous" with emergency rooms overflowing with the sick and wounded.
  - The Indonesia Hospital in northern Gaza records at least 65 deaths and over 100 injuries from ongoing Israeli bombardment.
  - At least three people are killed and dozens of others injured after an Israeli air strike hit the vicinity of Al-Nasr Hospital in western Gaza.
  - At least four people are killed and dozens others wounded from Israeli artillery fire and shelling in the southern Gaza Strip.
  - Two Israeli settlers are shot near the West Bank settlement of Itamar. Both are evacuated to Tel Aviv, where one remains in critical condition.
  - Mohammad Barakeh, the head of the High Follow-Up Committee for Arab Citizens of Israel, has been arrested by Israeli forces in Nazareth for planning a protest against the war.
  - Israeli forces use bulldozers to destroy streets in Jenin in the West Bank, supported by helicopters and reconnaissance aircraft, following a firefight in the city, killing eight Palestinians.
- 10 November –
  - A video is released showing a Palestinian prisoner being used as a human shield during the Israeli operation in the West Bank. The prisoner is handcuffed, blindfolded and kneeling on a street, as an Israeli soldier takes cover behind him, while aiming his rifle.
  - The UN human rights commissioner urged an investigation into Israel's use of "high-impact explosive weapons" in Gaza, which was causing indiscriminate destruction in the enclave and must "end its use of such weapons".
  - Six people are killed following an Israeli airstrike on the Al-Shifa Hospital. Human Rights Watch comments "hospitals must always be protected" and "no area is a free-fire zone", urging world leaders to act "to prevent further mass atrocities".
  - The Palestinian Red Crescent says Israeli forces bomb the Tal al-Hawa area of Gaza near Al-Quds Hospital.
  - The vicinity of Gaza's Patient's Friends Hospital is hit by an Israeli airstrike. Another Israeli strike is reported near Al-Awda Hospital in the Tal al-Zaatar area, resulting in damage to an ambulance.
  - The director of Gaza's Al-Rantisi Children's Hospital says that an Israeli airstrike has hit the medical facility, causing a fire.
  - Nearly 80 Palestinians are detained by Israeli forces from across the West Bank in overnight raids, many from Al-Arroub refugee camp north of Hebron; others were detained from Bethlehem, Nablus, Ramallah, and Jericho.
- 11 November –
  - The director of the Al-Shifa Hospital in Gaza City says that the medical complex is "completely cut off", with any "moving person targeted" by Israeli forces. Médecins Sans Frontières confirms reports that people are being shot at as they try to exit the hospital. Palestinian health minister Mai al-Kaila says that Israeli forces have also shelled the hospital with white phosphorus munitions which are banned under international law.
  - Israeli tanks and snipers fire at the Al-Quds Hospital in Gaza City from within twenty meters, where around 14,000 displaced people are sheltering in a state of "extreme panic and fear", according to the Palestinian Red Crescent.
  - The UN Humanitarian Affairs Office reports that at least 45 Palestinians have been displaced in the West Bank following Israeli punitive demolitions.
  - Digital rights organization Access Now says that shutdowns affecting internet access in the Gaza Strip are providing "cover for human rights atrocities", which are being worsened by Israel's control over internet access.
  - The Norwegian Refugee Council condemns Israeli attacks on Gaza hospitals, calling for an urgent ceasefire and for the protection of medical staff, saying that "it is an affront to wage war around and on hospitals".
  - The United Nations Office for the Coordination of Humanitarian Affairs says that the transfer of solid waste to landfills has stopped across the Gaza Strip because of insecurity and a shortage of fuel. The World Health Organization reports that the spread of infectious diseases including diarrhea and chickenpox are increasing rapidly, with medical organizations warning of the risk of a possible cholera epidemic.
  - At least 11,078 Palestinians have been killed in Gaza. The United Nations Office for the Coordination of Humanitarian Affairs says that 168 Palestinians, including 46 children, have been killed by Israeli forces in the West Bank. Another eight people, including one child, were killed by Israeli settlers in East Jerusalem.
  - HonestReporting, an Israel-based media watchdog, admits that the group had no evidence to back up their claims that some journalists were accomplices in the 2023 Hamas attack on Israel.
- 12 November –
  - South African Foreign Minister Naledi Pandor urges the International Criminal Court to issue an arrest warrant for Israeli prime minister Benjamin Netanyahu, calling on the prosecutor to investigate war crimes, crimes against humanity, and genocide.
  - The UN Development Programme office in Gaza is shelled, with reports of a significant number of deaths and injuries. Office chief Achim Steiner says that "civilians, civilian infrastructure and the inviolability of UN facilities must be always protected".
  - The United Nations says that several hospitals in Gaza have been directly hit, and that "hospitals are explicitly entitled to specific protection under international humanitarian law", as Israel intensifies its shelling and ground attacks around hospitals in Gaza City and northern Gaza.
- 13 November –
  - Gaza's two largest hospitals, Al-Shifa Hospital and Al-Quds Hospital, both suspend operations. Israeli snipers continue to fire at anyone near the Al-Shifa Hospital, trapping thousands of people inside.
  - Israeli troops of the Golani Brigade seize control of the Palestinian Legislative Council building in Gaza City, which has been used by Hamas lawmakers since 2007.
  - Israel bombs the Al-Salam Mosque in Sabra, increasing the total number of mosques destroyed by Israeli forces to more than 60.
  - United Nations compounds around the world lower the UN flag to half-mast to honor the 101 UN workers who have been killed by Israeli attacks.
  - The UN agency for Palestinian refugees says that the Israeli Navy damaged one of its guesthouses in Rafah, despite having shared coordinates with Israel multiple times.
  - Director of the UN agency for Palestinian refugees Thomas White says that humanitarian operations in Gaza will be suspended within the next 48 hours due to a shortage of fuel.
  - World Health Organization Director-General Tedros Adhanoms warns of a "dire and perilous" situation in Gaza's hospitals, saying that more patients, including premature babies, are dying.
  - The Palestinian Central Bureau of Statistics says that 3,117 students enrolled in schools in Gaza have been killed by Israel, while 4,613 have been injured. A further 130 teachers and school administrators are also killed. Twenty-four students have been killed in the West Bank.
- 14 November –
  - Israeli Prime Minister Benjamin Netanyahu says that "the IDF have completed the encirclement of Gaza City". Defense Minister Yoav Gallant also says that Hamas has "lost control" of Gaza City as Israeli troops capture the city's municipal buildings.
  - Seven Palestinians are killed in an Israeli raid in Tulkarm in the occupied West Bank.
- 15 November –
  - The Israel Defense Forces enter the Al-Shifa Hospital complex in Gaza City with infantry and tanks.
  - The UN Security Council passes a resolution calling for humanitarian pauses in the conflict, the establishment of humanitarian corridors, and for the unconditional release of hostages taken by Hamas. Russia, the United Kingdom, and the United States abstained.
  - A fuel truck enters the Gaza Strip through the Rafah Border Crossing from Egypt for the first time since the war began.
- 17 November –
  - An Israeli airstrike kills Ahmad Bahar, a senior leader in Hamas who served as the vice president of the Palestinian Legislative Council.
  - 10 fuel trucks enter the Gaza Strip from Egypt through the Rafah Border Crossing carrying 150,000 litres of diesel.
  - Israel calls on civilians to evacuate Khan Yunis in the south of Gaza and head to field hospitals, saying that Israeli troops will be carrying out a military operation in the area.
- 22 November – The Cabinet of Israel approves a deal to pause fighting in Gaza for four days. The deal, negotiated by Egypt, Qatar, and the United States, will also see Israel release 150 Palestinian prisoners in exchange for the release of some of the hostages held in Gaza, mostly women and children.
- 23 November – The Israel Defense Forces detain Mohammad abu Salmiya, the director of the Al-Shifa Hospital, and several doctors working under him, after a convoy belonging to the World Health Organization was stopped by Israeli soldiers. Israel accuses the director and the doctors of having sheltered Hamas fighters in the hospital.
- 24 November –
  - The 2023 Gaza war ceasefire to pause fighting in Gaza for four days enters into effect at 7 am local time.
  - On the first day of the ceasefire Hamas releases 13 Israeli hostages, some of whom are dual citizens while Israel releases 39 Palestinian prisoners as part of the ceasefire agreement.
  - Hamas releases 10 Thais and a Filipino as part of a separate deal with Bangkok, brokered by Iran.
- 25 November –
  - On day 2 of the ceasefire, Hamas releases 13 Israeli hostages and 4 Thai migrant workers, while Israel releases 39 Palestinian prisoners.
- 26 November –
  - Hamas releases three Thai migrant workers and 14 Israeli hostages, while Israel releases 39 Palestinian prisoners.
  - Eight Palestinians are killed and at least six others are injured in Israeli raids in the West Bank.
  - The Palestine Red Crescent Society says that a Palestinian farmer was killed and another was injured when they were targeted by Israeli forces in the Maghazi refugee camp in Gaza.
  - Hamas confirms the deaths of several senior commanders including Ahmed Ghandour, the commander of its Northern Gaza brigade, and Ayman Siam, the head of its rocket firing array. The Israel Defense Forces had previously said it had targeted Ghandour and Siam, but did not confirm that they had been killed.
  - Israeli Prime Minister Benjamin Netanyahu becomes the first Israeli head of government to enter the Gaza Strip in two decades, after visiting Israel Defense Forces troops stationed there.
- 27 November –
  - Hamas releases 11 Israeli hostages, while Israel releases 33 Palestinian prisoners.
  - Qatar announces an agreement between Israel and Hamas to extend the ceasefire by two days.
- 28 November –
  - Hamas releases two Thai migrant workers, 10 Israeli hostages and a pet dog, while Israel releases 30 Palestinian prisoners.
  - Two Palestinians are killed during clashes with Israel Defense Forces in the West Bank.
- 29 November –
  - Hamas releases four Thai migrant workers and 12 Israeli hostages while Israel releases 30 Palestinian prisoners. In a separate gesture to Russian President Vladimir Putin, two dual citizens of Israel and Russia are also freed by Hamas.
  - Israel Defense Forces, Shin Bet, and Israel Border Police announce in a joint statement that they killed Muhammad Zubeidi, the commander of the Jenin branch of the Palestinian Islamic Jihad.
    - Two children, aged 14 and 8, are shot dead by IDF troops in Jenin during the raid. The shootings are caught by security cameras.
- 30 November –
  - A deal is reached to extend the ceasefire for at least one further day, after it had been due to expire at 7:00 am IST Thursday.

=== December ===
- 1 December –
  - The ceasefire between Israel and Hamas ends after a deadline expires on the seventh day. Mediator Qatar says that efforts are ongoing to renew the ceasefire and expressed regret over the resumption of Israeli bombardments.
  - More than 180 Palestinians are killed, and hundreds more are injured, after Israeli warplanes carry out airstrikes on different parts of the Gaza Strip, including the community of Abasan al-Kabira and a home northwest of Gaza City.
- 2 December –
  - More than 190 Palestinians are killed and hundreds more are wounded by Israeli airstrikes on the Gaza Strip, including Khan Younis in the south.
    - The United Nations say the fighting will worsen the extreme humanitarian emergency in Gaza. UN aid chief Martin Griffiths said that the people of Gaza had nowhere safe to go and very little to survive on.
    - The United States provides BLU-109 bunker buster bombs and other munitions to Israel. Similar bombs made by the US have been used by Israel in the Jabalia refugee camp airstrikes, including a strike that levelled an apartment block, killing more than 100 people.
- 3 December –
  - At least 700 Palestinians have been killed during the last 24 hours by Israeli airstrikes in the Gaza Strip. Rights groups object to Israel's increased attacks in southern Gaza, which Israel had declared as a "safe zone".
- 4 December –
  - At least 316 Palestinians have been killed and 664 injured during the last 24 hours in the Gaza Strip.
  - Telecommunication services have been cut off in the Gaza Strip, the Palestinian telecoms company Paltel has said, as Israel intensifies its military operations.
  - Qatari prime minister Al Thani calls for an "immediate, comprehensive and impartial international investigation" into Israel’s military activities in Gaza.
  - United Nations shelters across Gaza record a spike in infectious diseases such as diarrhoea and skin infections, while only one hospital can take on complex surgery or critical trauma cases. One UN shelter in Gaza also reported a hepatitis A outbreak on Friday.
- 5 December –
  - Israeli troops and tanks enter Khan Yunis in the south of the Gaza Strip. Displaced families in the region are heading further south to Rafah, a town on the Egyptian border.
  - More than 100 people are killed in strikes near the Kamal Adwan Hospital in northern Gaza, as Israeli forces encircle the medical facility sheltering people. Witnesses say anyone attempting to leave was being shot at by Israeli snipers.
  - At the Gulf Cooperation Council summit, Qatari prime minister Al Thani calls for a permanent ceasefire in Gaza.
- 6 December –
  - Twenty-two members of a family are killed in an Israeli airstrike on the home in which they were sheltering in the Jabalia refugee camp in northern Gaza.
  - United Nations Secretary-General António Guterres invokes Article 99 of the UN Charter, urging the UN Security Council to act on the war in Gaza and adopt a resolution calling for a ceasefire.
  - UN high commissioner for human rights Volker Türk says his "colleagues describe the situation as apocalyptic" in Gaza, with a "heightened risk of atrocity crimes".
  - The UN agency for Palestinian refugees warns that the situation in Gaza is "getting worse each minute", and that “another wave of displacement is underway" amidst further military operations by Israel.
  - Twenty-two members of a family are killed in an Israeli airstrike on the home in which they were sheltering in the Jabalia refugee camp in northern Gaza.
  - United Nations Secretary-General António Guterres invokes Article 99 of the UN Charter, urging the UN Security Council to act on the war in Gaza and adopt a resolution calling for a ceasefire.
  - UN high commissioner for human rights Volker Türk says his "colleagues describe the situation as apocalyptic" in Gaza, with a "heightened risk of atrocity crimes".
  - The UN agency for Palestinian refugees warns that the situation in Gaza is "getting worse each minute", and that “another wave of displacement is underway" amidst further military operations by Israel.
- December 7 –
  - Amnesty International reports that American-made munitions were used in two Israeli airstrikes on residential buildings in Gaza that killed 43 civilians.
  - The International Criminal Court’s Prosecutor Karim Ahmad Khan called for humanitarian aid to be allowed into Gaza, adding that "willfully impeding relief supplies to civilians may constitute a war crime" under the ICC Rome Statute.
  - Israel foreign minister Eli Cohen revokes United Nations humanitarian coordinator Lynn Hastings's residence visa after she stated that "nowhere is safe in Gaza" and does not have the conditions needed to send aid to people.
- 8 December –
  - The United States vetoes a United Nations Security Council draft resolution calling for an immediate humanitarian ceasefire in Gaza. Thirteen other members voted in favor, while Britain abstained.
  - The Gaza Antiquities Ministry reports that the Great Mosque of Gaza, the oldest mosque in the Gaza Strip, was destroyed by Israeli bombardment.
  - The International Federation of Journalists reports that 68 journalists had been killed covering the war, with the majority being Palestinian journalists in the Gaza Strip.
- 9 December –
  - Israel carries out raids in Hebron, Qalqilya, Jericho, Jenin, Salfit and Ramallah in the West Bank.
  - Israel's bombardment of the Gaza Strip hits areas it declared "safe zones", a day after the United States vetoed a UN resolution calling for an immediate humanitarian ceasefire in Gaza.
  - The United States government uses an "emergency declaration" to allow the immediate delivery of 14,000 tank shells to Israel without congressional review.
- 10 December –
  - Jordan and the United Nations agency for Palestinian refugees have accused Israel of aiming to cleanse Gaza of its people through an "indiscriminate and brutal offensive" in a war which meets the "legal definition of genocide".
  - The World Health Organization adopts a resolution that calls for the passage of medical personnel and supplies into Gaza, mandates the documentation of violence against healthcare workers and patients, and seeks funding for hospital reconstruction.
  - The Palestinian Red Crescent Society says Israeli forces bombed and raided an area near the United Nations clinic in Jabalia camp where its emergency teams and medics are operating a medical post.
- 11 December –
  - Israeli forces shoot several medical personnel in Gaza, including the Ministry of Health director general of pharmacy, while they were trying to reach the ministry warehouses to get medical supplies for hospitals.
  - Seven Israeli troops are killed in clashes in the Gaza Strip, bringing the number of IDF personnel killed in action to 104.
  - Egypt and Mauritania invoke United Nations Resolution 377 for the UN General Assembly to discuss an immediate humanitarian ceasefire at an emergency session in New York City, in response to the United States vetoing a UN resolution with a similar objective.
- 12 December –
  - Ten Israeli troops are killed in clashes in the Gaza Strip, including a colonel of the Golani Brigade killed in Shuja'iyya, Gaza City, bringing the total number of IDF personnel killed to 115.
- 14 December – Tanzanian Foreign Minister January Makamba confirms that a 21-year-old Tanzanian student was "killed immediately after being captured by Hamas" on October 7.
- 15 December –
  - The Israel Defense Forces says that it mistakenly shot dead three hostages in friendly fire incidents in the Shuja'iyya neighborhood of Gaza City.
  - Israel authorizes the temporary use of its Kerem Shalom border crossing to deliver humanitarian aid to the Gaza Strip.
- 17 December –
  - Pope Francis accuses the IDF of engaging in war crimes, in response to Israeli snipers killing two Palestinian Christians and injuring seven others who were taking refuge in the Holy Family Church in Gaza City yesterday.
  - The French Foreign Ministry condemns Israel's Wednesday bombing of Rafah for killing one of its staff members, and demands an "immediate and durable" ceasefire.
  - Israeli Air Force airstrikes in Jabalia kill at least 90 people, according to the Gaza Health Ministry.
- 19 December – Israeli airstrikes against a residential area in Rafah kills at least 29 people, while ten others are killed in Jabalia.
- 20 December – The death toll in the Gaza Strip since Israel began airstrikes in response to Hamas leading an invasion of Israel on 7 October increases to at least 20,000 people.
- 21 December – The Israel Defense Forces says that it has established full "operational control" of the Shuja'iyya neighborhood in Gaza City, which has been the scene of intense clashes between Israeli troops and Hamas in recent weeks.
- 22 December – The UN Security Council passes a resolution on aid for Gaza.
- 24 December – At least 70 people are killed in an Israeli airstrike against the al-Maghazi refugee camp in the Gaza Strip.
- 28 December – Thousands of Palestinians flee Central Gaza as IDF tanks reach the outskirts of Bureij refugee camp.
- 30 December – The Israeli army continues its attacks; dozens of militants have been killed in Gaza with air support, while intense tank and aerial assaults on Khan Yunis persist. Additionally, buildings used by Hamas have been destroyed, and weapons seized.

== Deaths ==
- 5 February – May Sayegh, 82, poet and political activist.
- 22 February – Ahmed Qurei, 85, politician, prime minister (2003–2006).
- 9 April – Baker Abdel Munem, 80, diplomat.
- 20 April – Salma Khadra Jayyusi, 95, poet and anthropologist, founder of PROTA.
- 2 May – Khader Adnan, 45, hunger striker.
- 9 May – Jamal Khaswan, Chairman of the Board of Directors of Al-Wafa Hospital.
- 1 July – Qadri Abu Bakr, 70, politician, minister of detainees affairs (since 2018) and MP (since 2018).
- 27 September – Fayez Rashid, 73, political writer,
- 13 October –
  - Ali Nasman, 38, Palestinian activist and comedian
  - Wael Al Zard, 50, Palestinian Islamic preacher and university professor
  - Ali Qadhi, Hamas militant commander.
- 15 October –
  - Billal Al Kedra, Hamas militant commander.
  - Omar Ferwana, 67, gynaecologist and researcher.
- 16 October – Osama Mazini, 57, politician.
- 17 October – Ayman Nofal, Hamas militant commander.
- 19 October –
  - Jamila Abdallah Taha al-Shanti, 68, politician, MLC (since 2006)
  - Rafat Harev Hossein Abu Halal, militant, head of military for the Popular Resistance Committees.
  - Jihad Muheisen, militant, head of the Palestinian National Security Forces in the Gaza Strip
- 20 October– Hiba Abu Nada, poet and writer.
- 22 October – Rushdi Sarraj, journalist.
- 14 October
  - Ibrahim Qusaya, volleyball player
  - Mohammed Shabir, 77, politician and academic administrator, president of the Islamic University of Gaza (1990–2005)
- 14 November – Palestinians killed in a Gaza war airstrike:
  - Ibrahim Qusaya, volleyball player
  - Mohammed Shabir, 77, politician and academic administrator, president of the Islamic University of Gaza (1990–2005)
  - Khalil Athamna, 84, Palestinian historian and writer
- 17 November – Ahmad Bahar, 74, politician, deputy speaker of the legislative council (since 2006)

== See also ==
- Timeline of the Israeli–Palestinian conflict in 2023
- Outline of the Gaza war
