= 2025 in Palestine =

- Decades: 2000s; 2010s; 2020s
- See also: History of Palestine; Timeline of Palestinian history; List of years in Palestine

Events of the year 2025 in Palestine.

== Incumbents ==
| Photo | Post | Name |
|---|---|---|
| | President (PLO) | Mahmoud Abbas |
| | Vice President | Hussein al-Sheikh (from 26 April) |
| | Prime Minister | Mohammad Mustafa |

- Government of Palestine – Nineteenth government of Palestine

== Events ==
- Ongoing — Gaza war

=== January ===
- 1 January — The Palestinian Authority orders the suspension of broadcasts and operations by Al Jazeera in the West Bank, accusing it of broadcasting "inciting materials" and "misleading reports" that "provoke strife and interfere in Palestinian internal affairs".
- 2 January — Mahmoud Salah, the chief of police of the Gaza Strip, is killed along with his deputy, Hussam Shahwan, and nine others in an Israeli airstrike in Al-Mawasi, Rafah.
- 6 January – Palestinian gunmen kill three Israelis and injure eight others in a mass shooting on a bus in al-Funduq, West Bank.
- 17 January –
  - The Cabinet of Israel approves a ceasefire and prisoner exchange deal with Hamas.
  - Defense Minister Israel Katz announces that all Israeli settlers in administrative detention will be released in response to the release of Palestinian prisoners in the ceasefire deal.
- 19 January –
  - The ceasefire and prisoner exchange deal with Hamas comes into effect.
  - The IDF announces that the body of Oron Shaul, who was killed and captured by Hamas during the 2014 Gaza War, was recovered in an operation in Northern Gaza.
- 20 January – The first batch of 90 Palestinian prisoners to be released as part of the ceasefire agreement arrive in the West Bank.
- 21 January – The IDF conducts drone strikes and a ground raid in Jenin in a counterterrorism operation codenamed "Iron Wall", killing at least eight Palestinians and injuring 35.
- 25 January –
  - Four female IDF soldiers captured by Hamas during the 7 October attacks, including Naama Levy, are released by the group as part of the ceasefire agreement.
  - Two hundred Palestinian prisoners are released by Israel as part of the ceasefire agreement with Hamas.
- 27 January – Displaced Palestinians are allowed to return to the north of the Gaza Strip as part of the ceasefire agreement.
- 30 January –
  - Three Israelis and five Thais captured by Hamas during the 7 October attacks are released by the group as part of the ceasefire agreement.
  - 110 Palestinian prisoners are released by Israel as part of the ceasefire agreement.
  - Hamas confirms the killings of al-Qassam Brigades commander Mohammed Deif and his deputy Marwan Issa.

=== February ===
- 1 February –
  - Three Israelis captured by Hamas during the 7 October attacks are released by the group as part of the ceasefire agreement.
  - 183 Palestinian prisoners are released by Israel as part of the ceasefire agreement.
- 4 February –
  - A gunman kills two IDF soldiers at a checkpoint in Tayasir in the West Bank before being killed by responding soldiers.
  - US President Donald Trump announces that the US would take over the Gaza Strip.
- 8 February –
  - 183 Palestinian prisoners are released by Israel as part of the ceasefire agreement.
  - Three Israelis captured by Hamas during the 7 October attacks are released by the group as part of the ceasefire agreement.
- 9 February – The IDF withdraws from the Netzarim Corridor in the Gaza Strip as part of the ceasefire agreement.
- 10 February – Israeli police raid two bookstores in occupied East Jerusalem, including the Educational Bookshop. The store's owner and his nephew are arrested and the books are seized.
- 15 February –
  - 369 Palestinian prisoners are released by Israel as part of the ceasefire agreement.
  - Three Israelis captured by Hamas and Palestinian Islamic Jihad during the 7 October attacks are released by both groups as part of the ceasefire agreement.
- 20 February – Hamas returns the bodies of Kfir and Ariel Bibas and Oded Lifshitz, who were captured during the 7 October attacks but later died in captivity, as part of the ceasefire agreement. A fourth body, which Hamas claimed was Shiri Bibas, is later found to have been misidentified as a hostage. Hamas subsequently says that Shiri's remains had been mixed with those of other victims following an Israeli airstrike and that it will examine allegations over Shiri's remains, while asking Israel to return the body, which it identifies as a Palestinian woman.
- 21 February – Hamas says that it had handed over the remains of Shiri Bibas, which are subsequently identified by forensic experts.
- 22 February – Four Israelis captured by Hamas during the 7 October attacks and two others held in captivity after entering the Gaza Strip on their own in 2014 and 2015 are released by the group as part of the ceasefire agreement. They are the final living hostages held by Hamas to be released in the first phase of the deal.
- 26 February –
  - Hamas returns the bodies of four hostages captured during the 7 October attacks but later died in captivity, as part of the ceasefire agreement.
  - 596 Palestinian prisoners are released by Israel as part of the ceasefire agreement.
- 27 February – 46 Palestinian prisoners are released by Israel as part of the ceasefire agreement.

=== March ===
- 2 March – No Other Land, a documentary directed by two Palestinian and two Israeli filmmakers about Israeli demolitions in Masafer Yatta, West Bank, wins an Oscar for Best Documentary at the 97th Academy Awards.
- 18 March – Israel carries out attacks on the Gaza Strip, marking the end of the ceasefire with Hamas.
- 23 March – Senior Hamas official Salah al-Bardawil is killed along with his wife by an Israeli airstrike on their tent in Khan Yunis.
- 24 March – Oscar-winning director Hamdan Ballal is detained by the IDF after being assaulted by settlers who attack his home in Susiya in the West Bank. He is released the next day.
- 25 March – Anti-Hamas protests break out in the North Gaza Governorate.

=== April ===
- 26 April – Hussein al-Sheikh is appointed as vice president of the Palestine Liberation Organization.

=== May ===
- 3 May – Talal Naji, the Syria-based head of the Popular Front for the Liberation of Palestine-General Command (PFLP-GC), is detained near his residence in Damascus.
- 12 May – Edan Alexander, an Israeli-American soldier held captive in Gaza, is released by Hamas and returned to Israel following a deal mediated by the United States.
- 13 May – Mohammed Sinwar, the leader of Hamas in the Gaza Strip, is killed in an airstrike on the Gaza European Hospital in Khan Yunis.
- 14 May – A pregnant Israeli woman is killed and her husband is lightly injured in a shooting in the West Bank settlement of Brukhin.
- 16 May – The IDF launches the first phases of Operation Gideon's Chariots, a major military offensive seeking to "seize strategic areas" in Gaza.
- 18 May – Israeli Prime Minister Benjamin Netanyahu orders that the delivery of "basic" humanitarian aid to Gaza be resumed, ending the two-month total blockade.
- 21 May – The IDF fires warning shots near a delegation consisting of diplomats from almost two dozen countries visiting Jenin, claiming that they deviated from an approved route and entered an unauthorized area. It later apologizes for the incident.

=== June ===
- 9 June – The Madleen, which was en route to the Gaza Strip in an attempt to break the blockade and carried prominent activists such as Greta Thunberg and Rima Hassan, is raided by Israeli forces and diverted to Israel, with its passengers detained. Thunberg and several passenger are deported from Israel the next day.
- 10 June – The UK, Canada, Australia, New Zealand, and Norway announce travel bans and sanctions against Israeli far-right ministers Bezalel Smotrich and Itamar Ben-Gvir, accusing them of inciting settler violence against Palestinians in the West Bank. In response, Smotrich orders the cancellation of a policy allowing correspondence between Israeli and Palestinian Authority banks, which is crucial for sustaining the Palestinian economy.
- 26 June – Three people are killed by Israeli settlers in Kafr Malik near Ramallah in the West Bank.

=== July ===
- 9 July – The United Nations delivers 75,000 litres of fuel into the Gaza Strip in their first shipment in 130 days.
- 11 July – Two people, including a dual US-Palestinian national, are killed by Israeli settlers in Sinjil in the West Bank.
- 17 July – An Israeli strike on the Holy Family Church, the only Catholic church in the Gaza Strip, kills three civilians and injures others.
- 24 July –
  - Israel and the United States recall their delegations from the Gaza ceasefire talks, citing Hamas's lack of good faith.
  - France announces that it would recognize the State of Palestine effective September.
- 29 July – The United Kingdom announces that it would recognize the State of Palestine effective September unless Israel agrees to a ceasefire to end the Gaza War, allows the United Nations to deliver aid to the Gaza Strip, and does not carry out an annexation of the West Bank.
- 30 July – Canada and Malta announce that they would recognize the State of Palestine effective September.
- 31 July –
  - The United States imposes sanctions on unspecified officials of the Palestinian Authority and the Palestine Liberation Organization on charges of supporting the case against Israel in the International Criminal Court, terrorism and violence.
  - A US citizen is killed in an Israeli settler attack in Silwad.

=== August ===
- 11 August – Australia announces that it would recognize the State of Palestine effective September.
- 16 August – The United States suspends the issuance of visas to residents of the Gaza Strip amid criticism over their entry by far-right figures in the US.
- 18 August – Australia bars far-right Israeli MK Simcha Rothman from entering the country, prompting Israel to revoke the visas of Australian representatives to the Palestinian Authority in response.
- 20 August – Israel carries out a new offensive to occupy Gaza City.
- 22 August – The United Nations officially declares a famine in the Gaza Governorate, the first time it has declared such an event in the Middle East.
- 29 August –
  - The IDF announces that it killed the head of ISIS' Palestine District, in Gaza.
  - The United States revokes the visas of Palestinian president Mahmoud Abbas and 80 other officials of the Palestinian Authority.

=== September ===
- 2 September – Belgium announces that it would recognize the State of Palestine effective later in the month.
- 6 September – The Voice of Hind Rajab, a documentary film about the Gaza War, wins the Grand Jury Prize at the 82nd Venice International Film Festival in Italy.
- 7 September – The Supreme Court of Israel expresses "real doubts" that Palestinian prisoners were eating properly, and orders the prison service to ensure that the food served meets "basic subsistence conditions in accordance with the law".
- 8 September – Two Palestinian gunmen kill six people and injure ten others in a mass shooting at a bus stop in Ramot Junction, Jerusalem.
- 9 September – Israel carries out an airstrike on Hamas political leaders in Doha. The targeted members survive, but six others are killed.
- 12 September – A resolution is carried 142–10 with 12 abstentions in the United Nations General Assembly calling for Hamas to relinquish control over the Gaza Strip and disarm itself.
- 16 September –
  - The United Nations commission of inquiry on Palestine accuses Israel of committing "four of the five genocidal acts defined under international law" against Palestinians during its war in Gaza.
  - Luxembourg announces that it would recognize the State of Palestine effective next week.
  - Israel announces the start of the main phase of its Gaza City ground offensive.
- 18 September – Two Israeli soldiers are shot dead by a Jordanian at the Allenby Bridge border crossing between the West Bank and Jordan. The attacker is shot dead by Israeli forces. The attack was condemned by Jordan.
- 19 September – French authorities announce the arrest by the Palestinian Authority in the West Bank of Hicham Harb, who is accused of overseeing the Chez Jo Goldenberg restaurant attack in Paris in 1982.
- 20 September – Portugal announces that it would recognize the State of Palestine effective the next day.
- 21 September – The United Kingdom, Canada, Portugal, and Australia formally recognize the State of Palestine.
- 22 September – Andorra, Belgium, France, Luxembourg, Malta and Monaco formally recognize the State of Palestine. Belgium adds that it only take legal effect after the removal of Hamas from governance and the return of hostages. France adds that it will not open an embassy in the State of Palestine until hostages held in Gaza are released and a truce is in place. Andorra adds that the recognition will take effect once certain conditions are in place.
- 23 September – San Marino officially recognizes the State of Palestine.
- 24 September – Israel indefinitely closes the Allenby Bridge.
- 29 September – US President Donald Trump releases his peace proposal for the Gaza Strip.

=== October ===
- 1 October – The Israeli Navy intercepts the Global Sumud Flotilla off the coast of Gaza as it attempts to break the blockade of the Strip.
- 8 October – The IDF intercepts the Freedom Flotilla Coalition & Thousand Madleens in the Mediterranean Sea as it attempts to break the blockade of the Gaza Strip.
- 10 October – The Israeli cabinet ratifies a ceasefire agreement with Hamas which goes into effect at noon.
- 13 October – All 20 remaining living Israeli hostages taken by Hamas to the Gaza Strip in the 7 October attacks are released by Hamas in exchange for hundreds of Palestinian prisoners held by Israel as part of the ceasefire agreement.
- 14 October – Hamas releases the bodies of four apparent Israeli hostages, which are sent to the Abu Kabir Forensic Institute for identification. One of the bodies is found not to be that of a hostage following tests.

=== November ===
- 7 November – Turkey issues arrest warrants to 37 Israeli officials for crimes against humanity in the Gaza war, including Prime Minister Benjamin Netanyahu, Defence Minister Israel Katz, National Security Minister Itamar Ben-Gvir and IDF chief Lieutenant General Eyal Zamir.
- 17 November – The United Nations Security Council adopts Resolution 2083 welcoming the formation of the Board of Peace and authorizing an International Stabilization Force in the Gaza Strip.
- 18 November – One Israeli is killed while three others are injured in a ramming and stabbing attack at the Gush Etzion Junction in the West Bank.
- 26 November – The IDF carries out a major operation in the northern West Bank, resulting in parts of Tubas Governorate being sealed off.

=== December ===
- 4 December – Yasser Abu Shabab, the leader of the Israeli-backed anti-Hamas group Popular Forces dies after being reportedly injured in clashes with a local family in Gaza.
- 8 December – South Africa withdraws its 90-day visa-free entry policy for Palestinian nationals in response to the landing of unauthorized charter flights carrying Palestinians on its territory.
- 11 December – Storm Byron hits the Gaza Strip, killing at least 14 people and destroying at least 12 buildings already damaged due to Israeli bombing during the Gaza war.
- 16 December – US President Donald Trump issues a proclamation imposing partial travel restrictions on individuals holding Palestinian Authority-issued travel documents travelling to the United States.
- 19 December – The United Nations officially declares an end to the famine in the Gaza Strip.
- 22 December – The Israeli cabinet approves 19 new settlements in the occupied West Bank.
- 24 December – Three people are arrested on suspicion of setting fire to a Christmas tree and damaging a Nativity scene at the Holy Redeemer Church in Jenin.
- 27 December – The IDF carries out an operation in Qabatiya following a stabbing and car-ramming attack in northern Israel blamed on a resident of the town.
- 28 December – One person is killed by a collapsing wall due to a rainstorm in Rimal, Gaza City.

== Deaths ==
- 20 January – Basil Abdelrahman Hassan Nasser, 58, politician, Minister of State for Relief Affairs (2024–2025)
- 18 March:
  - Abu Hamza, militant, spokesperson for the Al-Quds Brigades (since 2019)
  - Issam al-Da'alis, 58, politician
- 23 March:
  - Salah al-Bardawil, 65–66, politician, member of the Palestinian Legislative Council (2006–2018)
  - Ismail Barhoum, politician, member of the Political Bureau of Hamas
- 13 May:
  - Mohammed Sinwar, 49, leader of Hamas in the Gaza Strip (since 2024)
  - Muhammad Shabana, 51-52, Commander of the Rafah Brigade (since 2014)
- 30 June – Ismail Abu Hatab, 32, photojournalist and filmmaker
- 6 August – Suleiman Obeid, 41, footballer (Shabab Al-Am'ari, national team)
- 10 August – Anas Al-Sharif, 28, journalist
- 23 August – Abdul Jawad Salih, 93, politician, member of the Palestinian Legislative Council (1996–2006), mayor of Al-Bireh (1967–1973)
- 25 August – Mariam Dagga, 33, journalist, 2025 Nasser Hospital strikes
- 30 August – Abu Obaida, 40, militant, spokesperson for the Al-Qassam Brigades (since 2007)
- 4 October – Zuhair Manasra, 82, governor of Jenin (1996–2002) and Bethlehem (2003–2005)
- 4 December – Yasser Abu Shabab, 31, leader of the Popular Forces
- 13 December – Ra'ad Sa'ad, 52-53, senior Al-Qassam Brigades commander
- 24 December – Mohammad Bakri, 72, Palestinian-Israeli film director (Jenin, Jenin) and actor (Haifa, The Lark Farm)

== See also ==
- Outline of the Gaza war
- Timeline of the Israeli–Palestinian conflict in 2025
