= 2026 in Palestine =

- Decades: 2000s; 2010s; 2020s
- See also: History of Palestine; Timeline of Palestinian history; List of years in Palestine

Events of the year 2026 in Palestine.

== Incumbents ==
Photo	Post	Name
	President (PLO)	Mahmoud Abbas
	Vice President	Hussein al-Sheikh
	Prime Minister	Mohammad Mustafa

- Government of Palestine – Nineteenth government of Palestine

== Events ==
- Ongoing — Gaza war

=== January ===
- 1 January —
  - Israel orders the banning effective 1 March of 37 humanitarian agencies from operating in the Gaza Strip for failing to comply with its revised regulations on the disclosure of detailed information on their Palestinian staff.
  - The Palestinian Authority submits applications for 14 locations across the West Bank and the Gaza Strip to be designated as World Heritage Sites by UNESCO.
- 5 January – The Israeli Ministry of Communications approves the delivery of equipment necessary to upgrade Palestinian cellular networks from 3G to 4G in the West Bank.
- 14 January – The United States announces the start of the second phase of the Gaza peace plan.
- 19 January – The IDF launches a large-scale counterterrorism raid in Hebron, arresting at least seven people.
- 20 January – Israel demolishes the headquarters of UNRWA in Sheikh Jarrah, East Jerusalem.
- 21 January – Israeli national security minister Itamar Ben-Gvir allows the issuance of gun licences to residents of 18 Israeli settlements in the West Bank.
- 26 January – The body of Ran Gvili is recovered by the IDF from northern Gaza, ending the Gaza war hostage crisis.

=== February ===
- 2 February – The Rafah Border Crossing is partially reopened under the supervision of Israel and Egypt.
- 18 February – A 19-year old Palestinian American is killed in an attack by Israeli settlers on the village of Mukhmas in the West Bank.
- 23 February – Israel designates the online Palestinian media platforms Al Asima News, Quds Plus, Alquds Albawsala, Maraj and Maydan Alquds as terrorist organizations, accusing connections to Hamas.
- 27 February – The Supreme Court of Israel allows aid groups barred for refusing to comply with new Israeli regulations to continue operating in Gaza and other Palestinian territories while it considers the case.
- 28 February – The Rafah Border Crossing is closed by Israel, citing "security reasons" amid the start of the 2026 Iran war.

=== March ===
- 8 March – Two Palestinians are shot dead at a close range in the head by Israeli settlers in Abu Falah, in the occupied West Bank. Another Palestinian is killed after Israeli soldiers throw smoke grenades during the attack.
- 12 March – The IDF drops charges against five soldiers accused of raping a Palestinian prisoner at the Sde Teiman detention camp.
- 14 March – Hamas calls for Iran to cease their attacks on Middle East neighbors during the war. They also reaffirm Iran's right to defend itself from Israel and the US.
- 15 March –
  - Israeli forces kill a Palestinian couple and two of their children in Tammum, West Bank.
  - Eight police officers, including the police chief of the Deir al-Balah Governorate in Gaza, are killed by an Israeli attack on a police vehicle in Az-Zawayda.
- 18 March – Four people are killed in an Iranian missile attack that hit a hair salon in Beit Awwa, West Bank.
- 19 March – The Rafah Border Crossing partially reopens for the first time since the start of the 2026 Iran war.

=== April ===
- 26 April – 2026 Palestinian local elections: Supporters of president Abbas win a majority of contested seats including some in Gaza's Deir al-Balah. One of the Deir al-Balah lists, largely seen as Hamas-aligned, win only two of the 15 seats contested in Gaza.

=== May ===
- 15 May – Izz al-Din al-Haddad, the leader of Hamas in the Gaza Strip, is killed in an Israeli airstrike in Rimal, Gaza City.
- 20 May – The U.S. Office of Foreign Assets Control removes sanctions on Francesca Albanese, the UN Special Rapporteur on occupied Palestinian territories, after district judge Richard J. Leon of the District of Columbia blocked measures imposed over Albanese's criticism of Israel and its actions in Gaza.
- 21 May – The Trump administration announces that it will revoke the visas of the Palestinian delegation to the UN if the Palestinian ambassador does not withdraw his candidature for the vice presidency of the UN General Assembly.
- 26 May – Mohammed Odeh, the leader of Hamas in the Gaza Strip, is killed in an Israeli airstrike.
- 29 May – The European Union expands Hamas and PIJ sanctions.

=== June ===
- 9 June – The UK, Canada, France, Norway, Australia and New Zealand imposes sanctions on networks that finance and enable settler violence in the West Bank.
- 26 June – Anti-Hamas protests erupt in Gaza City and other areas of northern Gaza. Hamas deploys armed operatives on Gaza streets to suppress the protests.

=== July ===
- 2 July – Hamas announces that it executed a person in Gaza whom it accused of collaborating with Israel and assisting in the assassination of several senior Hamas leaders, including former Hamas leader in the Gaza Strip Izz al-Din Haddad.
- 6 July — Hamas announces the resignation of its civil administration under the Gaza peace plan.
- 13 July — The EU announces that it had reach a deal with Israeli authorities for the implementation of two large waste and water management projects in Gaza.
- 15 July — Morocco signs an agreement to join the International Stabilization Force in Gaza.
- 16 July — The Palestinian Authority releases an audit which supposedly found that a new welfare program stopped a scheme that critics described as "pay-to-slay" in response to US pressure.
- 20 July — Hamas announces the election of Khalil al-Hayya as its leader.
- 23 July
  - An Israeli is critically injured in a stabbing in the vicinity of Elon Moreh. The two Palestinian assailants are shot and killed.
  - An Israeli is moderately injured in a stabbing in the vicinity of Ganim. The assailant is subdued.
- 24 July —
  - Two Israelis including a soldier and a Hagmar reservist and four Palestinian civilians are killed, two other Israelis are critically and moderately injured and four Palestinians are injured, three seriously in a shooting in the vicinity of Havat Gilad after confrontations broke out.
  - The archaeological site of Sebastia is designated as a UNESCO World Heritage Site.
- 26 July — The Israeli security cabinet authorises the entry of President Trump's Board of Peace into Gaza.
- 27 July —
  - Palestinian media reports that a woman lost her pregnancy after an ambulance was delayed at a checkpoint in the West Bank following a blockade imposed on Nablus.
  - Sixty Palestinian detainees are released by Israel into Gaza.
- 28 July — The IDF and Israeli Civil Administration demolish a Palestinian home erected without a permit in Ein al-Hilweh in the West Bank, despite the Supreme Court of Israel's interim ruling urging the state not to demolish the structure until it responds.
- 30 July — Hamas and other Palestinian factions agree to a progressive disarmament plan in the Gaza Strip under international supervision.

=== August ===
- 2 August – The Al-Quds Brigades agree to the Board of Peace disarmament plan for Gaza.
- 5 August — Twenty-four Palestinian detainees are released by Israel.
- 9 August — Israeli Prime Minister Benjamin Netanyahu authorizes reconstruction in areas of Gaza which are not under Hamas control, the initiative will be led by the United Arab Emirates.
- 13 August —
  - Settlers move into the reconstructed Ganim settlement in the West Bank.
  - The mandate of the European Union Border Assistance Mission to Rafah and the European Union Police Mission for the Palestinian Territories at the Rafah crossing is extended by Israel until the end of June 2027.
  - Extremist Israeli settlers from Hilltop Youth besiege the homes of three Palestinian families, including one owned by an American national in Qusra, trapping 15 people including two children.
- 14 August — Israeli Defence Minister Israel Katz orders the transfer of all enforcement powers against Israeli settlers in the West Bank from the IDF to the Israel Police.
- 16 August — Ten Palestinians and two Israelis are injured in a confrontation in Hebron allegedly triggered by a settler attack.
- 17 August — Thirty-five Palestinian prisoners released by Israel return to Gaza.
- 23 August — An Israeli is moderately injured in a stabbing attack in the vicinity of Al-Auja.
- 25 August —
  - Israeli far-right MK Zvi Sukkot and his aides damage a Palestinian monument in Madama.
  - Israeli Prime Minister Benjamin Netanyahu orders the evacuation of the UNRWA compound in Kafr 'Aqab neighborhood of East Jerusalem, blaming the agency for the 7 October attacks.
- 29 August —
  - Witnesses state that IDF troops fired tear gas, handcuffed, blindfolded, and beat residents inside a Qusra home which had been attacked by settlers.
  - A group of NBC News reporters are attacked by masked Israeli settlers in Jalud.
- 30 August — Thirteen Palestinian prisoners are released by Israel into Gaza.
- 31 August — The Israel Discount Bank agrees to postpone its plan to cease providing correspondent banking services to Palestinian financial institutions amid international pressure from President Trump and the European Union.

=== September ===
- 1 September —
  - Under pressure from the Israeli government, 45,000 Palestinian children in schools in East Jerusalem are now required to study the Israeli curriculum.
  - Dozens of East Jerusalem private schools hold a strike on the first day of the new school year due to restrictions on teachers from the West Bank.
- 2 September — Israel demolishes Al-Tabban village in the West Bank, citing an Israeli Supreme Court verdict that incorrectly determined that Palestinians living in Firing Zone 918 did not live there permanently before the area was declared a firing zone. (Note: It also stated that Palestinians had no right to live there.)
- 7 September —
  - One Israeli is injured in a stabbing attack at a farming outpost in the vicinity of Osarin in the West Bank. The assailant is shot dead by the IDF.
  - Israel releases 12 Palestinian prisoners into Gaza.
- 8 September —
  - Canada, Denmark, Finland, France, Iceland, Ireland, Norway, Poland, Portugal, Spain, Sweden and the UK sanction products from Israeli settlements in the West Bank.
  - In response to sanctions, Israel orders the closure of the UK consulate in East Jerusalem.
- 9 September — Israeli Finance Minister Bezalel Smotrich announces that Israel demolished 35 Palestinian structures in the West Bank to make way for new settlement roads.
- 16 September —
  - A building damaged during the Gaza war collapses in Gaza City, killing 21 people.
  - The Trump administration announces that President Abbas and his delegation are barred from attending the UN General Assembly in New York, accusing them of breaching US law.
- 19 September — Schools in the Gaza Strip reopen for the first time since the beginning of the Gaza war.
- 20 September — An Israeli is killed in a gun attack in the vicinity of Halamish. The attacker is later caught by the IDF.
- 22 September – Canada announces C$100 million in international aid to Palestine.
- 23 September —
  - Israeli authorities conduct demolitions in Jinba, citing an Israeli Supreme Court decision that incorrectly determined that Palestinians living in Firing Zone 918 did not live there permanently before the area was declared a firing zone. (Note: It also claimed that Palestinians had no right to live there.)
  - The son of Israeli Ambassador to the US Yechiel Leiter is critically injured in a car ramming attack at the Maccabim Junction along Route 443 in the West Bank. The attacker is shot dead at the scene by the IDF.
  - Israeli authorities uproot Palestinian olive trees in Deir Nidham ahead of the annual harvest.
- 24 September —
  - The Committee to Protect Journalists remove 22 people from its list of journalists killed in the Gaza war, after they were identified as militants.
  - Norway pledges an additional 125 million Norwegian kroner ($13.17 million) in aid to Palestine, bringing overall assistance to the country to almost 1 billion Norwegian kroner in that year.
  - Britain announces an £88 million ($116.25 million) aid package for Palestine.
- 25 September — Sixty-one additional firms are added to an UN Human Rights Council list of firms which operate in Israeli West Bank settlements.
- 27 September — Citing concerns about electioneering, the Attorney General of Israel orders a month-long delay in E1 proposals.
- 29 September — Hamas and the PIJ agree to form an electoral coalition with former Fatah official Mohammed Dahlan for the 2026 Palestinian legislative election, which will support "a unified national list" composed of independent figures rather than group members.

=== October ===
- 1 October — According to village council head Jumaa Abdel Fattah, Israeli settlers shoot and kill Mashour Yassin, 51, a Palestinian man at his home in Yasuf, West Bank, and injure two other Palestinians, with Israeli authorities announcing that it is investigating the incident. The IDF states that it opened the fire after Palestinians threw rocks against Israeli settlers who arrived in the village. (Note: Following the 7 October attacks, there was a significant increase in the IDF's use of lethal force in the West Bank, particularly against Palestinian stone throwers (categorized by the military as "terrorism").)
- 2 October –
  - The US imposes sanctions on Hamas' financing network, which includes two French-based funds.
  - The mayor of Kobar announces that young Palestinians in the village attempted to pass through a gate recently erected by settlers to keep them inside the village when they were attacked, resulting in a clash in which a man was fatally shot by the IDF.
- 4 October — Following the IDF's recommendation, Israeli Defense Minister Israel Katz announces that crossings into the West Bank and Gaza will be closed during the days marking the 7 October attacks.
- 8 October — The Yesha Council announces that Israeli Defense Minister Israel Katz has ordered a ban on pro-Palestinian activists, whether Israeli or foreign, seeking to assist Palestinian olive growers in the West Bank during the harvest season, citing the Council's demand to prevent activists from "coming to the olive harvest area to create provocations and confrontations."
- 10 October —
  - President Abbas postpones presidential and legislative elections to September 2027, citing hurdles posed by the Israeli government.
  - For his reporting on Gaza, freelance journalist Mahmoud Abu Hamda is honored with the Bayeux Calvados-Normandy Award for war correspondents.
- 13 October —
  - Four Palestinians, including two women and a 14-year-old girl, are beaten by Israeli settlers in Talfit, leaving the girl and the younger lady with fractured legs and chest injuries.
  - An Israeli settler attack during the olive harvest in Beit Lid injures two Palestinian women.
  - The Deutsche Gesellschaft für Internationale Zusammenarbeit and the National Committee for the Administration of Gaza signs a memorandum of understanding to support "recovery and reconstruction" in Gaza.
- 14 October — Israel's Coordinator of Government Activities in the Territories says that private-sector merchants in Gaza have announced that they are suspending coordination for the entry of goods into the Strip until further notice, following what it describes as a forced taxation mechanism imposed by Hamas and escalating threats against merchants, a claim denied by the group.
- 16 October —
  - Israeli settlers burn Palestinian olive trees, injure two individuals, including The Washington Post's Heidi Levine.
  - Dov Lior, a hardline Orthodox Israeli rabbi, issues a halachic ruling permitting Jews to take Palestinian olives, framing it as a fulfillment of the conquering of the Land of Israel.
- 17 October —
  - Palestinian media reports that Israeli settlers stabbed to death about 20 sheep belonging to Palestinians while raiding a farm in Kafr Malik.
  - Palestinians and European diplomats are attacked by Israeli settlers in the vicinity of Taybeh.
- 18 October — Maryam Bsharat wins gold in the Junior Women’s under-66kg kumite category at the World Cadet, Junior and U21 Karate Championships in Poland.
- 19 October — Due to a shortage of financing, the World Food Program announces that it will stop providing monthly aid to 500,000 Palestinians in Gaza.
- 20 October —
  - During a public diplomacy tour with the pro-settlement Regavim movement in the West Bank town of Turmus Ayya, Fleur Hassan-Nahoum, a candidate for the right-wing Amcha Yisrael party, has her car window smashed by a rock thrown by a Palestinian.
  - After merchants report that Hamas authorities have withdrawn demands for payments of 10,000 shekels ($3,225) per truck, which Hamas describes as a voluntary contribution by better-off Palestinians in Gaza to a national fund supporting people in need in the territory, Israel's COGAT announces that it will resume permitting commercial goods shipments into Gaza.
- 21 October — Israeli forces detain some 90 persons during olive harvesting, including international observers coordinated by Protect the Harvest.
- 22 October — The Red Cross announces that it had facilitated the release of the body of a Palestinian from Gaza who died in IDF detention under unexplained circumstances a week after the 7 October attacks.
- 23 October — Two IDF soldiers are killed and three other soldiers are wounded in a gun attack at the Judea Junction on Route 35. The two attackers are shot dead by the IDF at the scene. In response, Israeli Prime Minister Netanyahu orders a "full lockdown" of the West Bank.
- 31 October — Two children die after an overnight fire in a tent sheltering displaced Palestinians in the al-Mawasi area of Khan Yunis.

=== November ===
- 2 November — The IDF withdraws from several Hebron neighborhoods after an 11-day raid.
- 3 November — Six Palestinian militants are detained for attempting to produce rockets to fire towards Israel.
- 5 November — A group of former IDF generals assist Palestinian olive farmers in the West Bank.
- 7 November — Torrential rain and sewage floods the tents of thousands of displaced people in Gaza.
- 8 November — At least four Palestinians, including a woman and three children, are killed when a sand embankment and cliff collapsed at a displacement shelter in Deir al-Balah, central Gaza, following strong storms.
- 12 November — A nine-month old infant boy dies due to hypothermia in his displaced family's tent in Khan Yunis.
- 16 November
  - The IDF announces that it razed the Ramallah home of a Palestinian accused of trying to manufacture rockets to launch from the West Bank at Israeli targets.
  - The European Union imposes terrorism sanctions on Gaza Now and its founder for allegedly soliciting funds for Hamas.
- 18 November — To target what it described as a tunnel posing a threat to troops, the IDF initiates a ground operation west of the Yellow Line in the central Gaza Strip, advancing tanks onto Salah al-Din Road close to the Nuseirat and Bureij refugee camps, a raid denounced by Hamas as a blatant breach of the October 2025 ceasefire.
- 19 November —
  - The IDF returns 9 detainees back to Gaza after determining they were not involved in militancy.
  - The IDF announced that it completed a tank raid targeting "Hamas infrastructure" in central Gaza.

== Deaths ==
- 18 February – Leila Shahid, 76, diplomat.
- 27 February – Adeeb Naser, 86–87, poet.
- 8 March – Walid Khalidi, 100, historian.
- 15 March – Jamal Rayyan, 72, news anchor (Al Jazeera).
- 18 March – Muhammad Abu Shahla, senior field commander of the Khan Younis brigade and the brigade's intelligence chief.
- 21 March – Muhammad Kamal Hassouna, 84, politician, minister of national economy (2007–2009).
- 15 May – Izz al-Din al-Haddad, Islamic militant, commander of Hamas in the Gaza Strip (since 2025).
- 26 May – Mohammed Odeh, Islamic militant, commander of Hamas in the Gaza Strip (since 2026).
- 9 August – Diab Al-Louh, 68, ambassador to Egypt (since 2017).
- 24 August – Sliman Mansour, 79, sculptor, painter and author.

== See also ==
- Outline of the Gaza war
- Timeline of the Israeli–Palestinian conflict in 2026
