= 2027 in Palestine =

- Decades: 2000s; 2010s; 2020s
- See also: History of Palestine; Timeline of Palestinian history; List of years in Palestine

Events of the year 2027 in Palestine.

== Events ==
=== Predicted and scheduled ===
- 11 September
  - 2027 Palestinian legislative election
  - 2027 Palestinian presidential election
