= Ahmad Samir Qannita =

Ahmad Samir Qannita or Ahmad Samir Quneita, known as Abu Obaida (Arabic: أبو عبيدة, romanized: Abū ʿUbayda, lit. 'father of worshippers'; also spelled Ubaida, Ubayda, Ubaydah), is a media figure with the Hamas military unit, the Al-Qassam Brigades.

== Career ==
A pro-Hamas blogger, he was published by Al-Jazeera in 2019. One post praised children's military summer camps held by Hamas’ al-Qassam Brigades for instilling the values of jihad, and praised Islamist preacher Yusuf al-Qaradawi, resulting in condemnation by the US State Department in 2020.

His father-in-law was Palestinian doctor Omar Ferwana. On 15 October 2023, Ferwana, his wife, children, and grandchildren were killed during an airstrike attack fired by Israeli Air Force on Qannita's home located in Tel al-Hawa, southwest of Gaza City, during the Gaza war. The Gaza Martyrs Register records the death of Obaida Ahmed Samir Quneita, age 5, and Rima Ahmed Samir Quneita, age 3, on this day.

In August 2025, his family home was reported by Saudi news outlet Al Arabiya to have been struck by the IDF. This strike was reported by the IDF as having killed a Hamas spokesman also known as Abu Obaida, Huthayfa Samir Abdallah al-Kahlout, but Hamas stated that the latter's family were in good condition.
