= Al-Quds Hospital =

Hospital in Gaza Strip, Palestine

Al-Quds Hospital مستشفى القدس
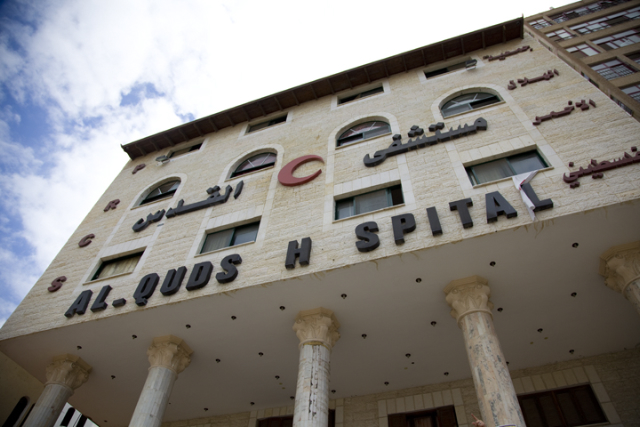

Geography
- Location: Shuja'iyya, Gaza City, Palestine
- Coordinates: 31°30′22″N 34°25′50″E

Organisation
- Type: General

The Al-Quds Hospital (Arabic: مستشفى القدس) is a hospital located in the Tel al-Hawa area of Gaza City, Palestine. It is the second largest hospital in Gaza.

== History ==
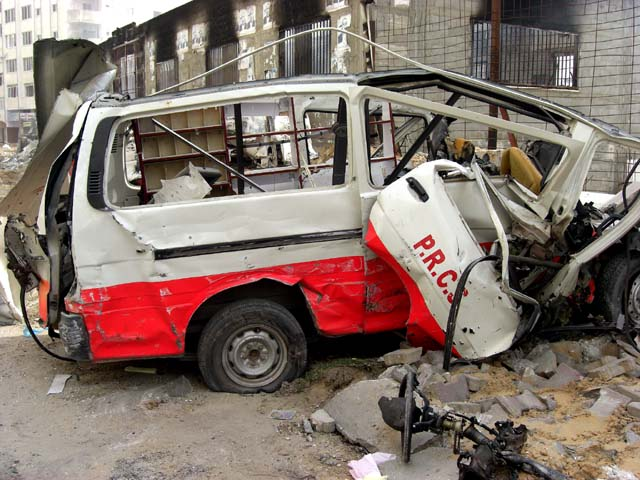
Destroyed ambulance in the city of Shuja'iyya in the Gaza Strip after Israeli shelling of the Al-Quds Hospital, January 2009

The hospital was damaged by Israeli forces in 2009, during the Gaza war of 2008-2009.

The hospital was damaged again as part of the Gaza war. On 11 November, fighting was reported at the hospital. The Palestinian Red Crescent Society reported that Israeli tanks approached the hospital, and began firing upon it. They reported that about 14,000 displaced people were sheltering inside of it at the time of the fighting. Evangelical Christian website All Israel News reported that a Hamas battalion operating from the hospital ambushed IDF troops; saying that 21 militants were killed whereas the Israelis suffered no casualties. The clash was filmed by a drone scrambled from nearby.

In the early morning of 12 November, an Israeli attack hit near the hospital and damaged it. Later that day, the Palestine Red Crescent Society announced that the hospital had run out of fuel and ceased treating patients. On 13 November, Palestine Red Crescent Society condemned allegations that Hamas was attacking from the hospital saying the video from the drone only showed them in the street outside the hospital.

== See also ==
- List of hospitals in the State of Palestine
- The Red Crescent Society, Jerusalem runs a teaching hospital at Al-Quds University.
