= Omar Ferwana =

Palestinian gynaecologist (1956–2023)

- عمر فروانة
- Born: Omar Saleh Omar Ferwana; 7 February 1956; Sabra, Gaza, All-Palestine Protectorate
- Died: 15 October 2023 (aged 67); Tel al-Hawa, Gaza Strip, Palestine
- Cause of death: Israeli airstrike
- Other names: O S Ferwana, Ferwana OS
- Occupations: Gynaecologist and researcher

Omar Saleh Omar Ferwana (Arabic: عمر فروانة; 7 February 1956 – 15 October 2023) was a Palestinian gynaecologist and researcher. He worked as a dean and assistant professor at Islamic University of Gaza, Faculty of Medicine.

== Biography ==
Ferwana was born in Sabra, Gaza on 7 February 1956. He was educated at Cairo University, Faculty of Medicine, where he was awarded a Bachelor of Medicine, Bachelor of Surgery in 1982, then he specialized in obstetrics and gynecology. He obtained his PhD in physiology from University of Leeds. He was a member of the board of directors of the Patient's Friends Society-Gaza.

On 17 December 1992, he was expelled by Israel along with 414 others accused of incitement and association with Hamas and Islamic Jihad to Marj al-Zohour in southern Lebanon, beyond the Israeli Security Zone. Ferwana was there in charge of the medical committee, and he ran the clinic there.

His father was the poet Saleh Omar Ferwana (Arabic: صالح عمر فراونة; 1936 – 10 March 2013). He published a diwan entitled “Mufradāt Filasṭīnīyah” (Arabic: مفردات فلسطينية) in 2004, and the second part in 2011.

His son-in-law was Ahmad Samir Qannita, known as Abu Obaida, a prominent media figure with the Al-Qassam Brigades. On 15 October 2023, he, his wife, children, and grandchildren were killed during an airstrike attack fired by Israeli Air Force on Qannita‘a home located in Tel al-Hawa, southwest of Gaza City, during the Gaza war. Qannita said “they laid down their lives in defense of Islam against the forces of disbelief and evil who conspired to eradicate our faith.”
