= Mohammed Shabir =

Palestinian politician and academic (1946–2023)

Mohammed Shubair
- محمد شبير
- Born: Mohammed Eid Hammad Shubair; 28 March 1946; Khan Yunis, Palestine
- Died: 12 November 2023 (aged 77); Gaza Strip, Palestine
- Cause of death: Israeli airstrike
- Occupations: Academic and politician

Mohammed Shubair (Arabic: محمد شبير; 28 March 1946 – 12 November 2023) was a Palestinian politician and academic who served as president of the Islamic University of Gaza from 1992 to 2006. He was the Prime Minister-in-waiting for the National Unity Government 2007.

== Biography ==
Shubair was originally from Khan Yunis and received his doctorate in microbiology from Marshall University. He had six children. His wife served as deputy minister of women's affairs.

He was a professor of microbiology and virology and served as president of the Islamic University of Gaza from 1992 to 2006.

Senior Hamas officials announced that Hamas and Fatah had agreed on him to be Prime Minister for the National Unity Government 2007 on 13 November 2006. Shubair, however, did not become prime minister. Salam Fayyad became Prime Minister when Hamas took over Gaza, in 2007. Considered close to both Hamas and Fatah, Shubair frequently visited the late Yasser Arafat in his West Bank and Gaza Strip headquarters.

=== Death ===
Shubair was killed in an Israeli air strike after initially surviving an airstrike during the Gaza war on 12 November 2023. He was 77. The airstrike on the home he was displaced to killed five people, including a baby. Shubair was killed with his wife Rehab Shubair, their daughter-in-law Najat Ayoub Alhelo, and their grandson, Muhammad Malik Shubair. His death has been cited as an example of Israel attacks on academia during the Gaza war. At least two other former presidents of the Islamic University of Gaza were also killed during the Gaza war. He is mentioned in South Africa's genocide case against Israel.

== See also ==
- Ismail Haniyeh
- Palestinian Authority
