= 2026 Palestinian local elections =

- April 25, 2026
- 4,097 Council members
- Turnout: 53.5% West Bank: 56% Gaza Strip: 23%

Elections for 403 local authorities in Palestine were held on April 25, 2026. These elections took place in both the West Bank and the Gaza Strip; since 2006, they were the first Palestinian elections to include the Gaza Strip ruled by Hamas, as well as being the first elections to take in this region, despite its destruction in the ongoing Gaza war. The main competition took place in the city of Deir al-Balah in the Gaza Strip. Domestic civil society organizations, private individuals, and international journalists were permitted to apply to become observers of the elections.

Supporters of Fatah president Mahmoud Abbas won a majority of seats. The Deir al-Balah list seen as Hamas-aligned won only 2 of the 15 seats contested in Gaza, while 6 were won by candidates described either as aligned with Fatah or with Fatah dissidents discontent with the Palestinian authority; the rest were taken by nonpartisan lists.

== Background and results ==
These elections were the first one to include the Gaza Strip ruled by the Gaza Strip under Hamas and were taking place amidst the ongoing Gaza war. Despite the last one of the formal ceasefires with Hamas being signed in October 2025, it was broken by Israel, which continued its strikes. By the time the elections were taking place, much of Gaza was reduced to rubble, with many residents displaced by Israel or being focused on survival. Chairman of the Central Elections Commission Rami Hamdallah also stated that "some of the ballot boxes and voting equipment did not make it into the enclave because of Israeli security restrictions, though those challenges were overcome."

The city Deir al-Balah was the only part of Gaza to participate in the elections. Unlike many parts of Gaza, it faced less destruction and remained under the control of Hamas. It was the first election taking place in Gaza after the Hamas coup: prior, they had been appointing mayors from above. This time, Hamas allowed the elections and reportedly did not intervene in the process, although securing the perimeter of every polling station.

The West Bank-based Palestinian Authority (PA) led by Abbas and Fatah said the inclusion of Deir al-Balah, a city in the Gaza Strip which suffered less damage than other areas of the coastal territory during the war, was intended to show that Gaza was an inseparable part of a future Palestinian state. Prime Minister Mohammad Mustafa said that the elections were held "at a highly sensitive moment amid complex challenges and exceptional circumstances," but represented "an important first step in a broader national process aimed at strengthening democratic life ... and ultimately achieving the unity of the homeland." Fatah spokesperson Abdul Fattah Dawla noted that turnout was close to that for the last municipal elections in the West Bank in 2022 and praised voters for participating despite ongoing violence by Israel. Fatah said that the results marked a qualitative shift in Palestinian democracy and called 2026 a "year of Palestinian democracy" launched by Abbas. The elections were described not only as a reaffirmation of Palestinian unity, but also as a public referendum regarding the political program of Fatah and national vision; the victory was thus framed as support for these. Analysts described the elections as an attempt of Fatah to reassert it legitimacy in Gaza and its positions in the future peace talks, since previously it had taken little to no part in international discussions regarding a post-war Gaza. The Israeli Institute for National Security Studies wrote that the election in fact demonstrated the distrust to Fatah and the Palestinian Authority among the populace and lack of their popularity: according to them, the Deir al‑Balah list described as Fatah-backed in fact comprised Fatah dissidents like Mohammed Dahlan critical of the Palestinian Authority, and so in competitive districts "independent lists either won outright or shared power with Fatah."

As Reuters reports, Hamas formally did not participate in the elections and rejected the rhetoric the PA and Fatah. The spokesperson of the Hamas' Gaza administration Hazem Qassem downplayed the significance of the election results, saying that they had no impact on wider national issues. There are other quotations of Quassem describing the Deir al-Balah vote as "an important step", calling for broader elections at all levels to "rebuild Palestinian legitimacy" and saying the process should reflect "the will of the people" and emphasizing coordination to ensure a "fair and transparent vote."

According to Hamdallah, in Gaza voter turnout reached just 23%, while in the West Bank it was 56%. The total turnout was 53.5%.

The formal contestants were grouped in electoral lists. The ones of Fatah were titled "Resilience and Giving". In Deir al‑Balah, the lists were nominally independent, with candidates affiliated with parties mostly grouped based in tribal and professional alliances. Hamas refused to formally set forth its candidates and boycotted the elections in the West Bank, occupied by Israel, where the Fatah victory was expected; however, the Deir al‑Balah list "Deir al‑Balah Brings Us Together" is seen as the one affiliated with Hamas. It contested with the other 3 local lists: with the "Nahdat Deir al‑Balah" ("Deir al-Balah Renaissance") backed by Fatah, and also with "Future of Deir al‑Balah" and "Peace and Building" affiliated neither with Hamas nor Fatah. Meanwhile, many West Bank candidates from Fatah were running unchallenged.

In the Gaza Strip, "Nahdat Deir al‑Balah" won 6 seats, "Deir al‑Balah Brings Us Together" won 2, and the remaining ones were taken by the candidates of the two other lists.

Palestinian political analyst Reham Ouda commented on the victory of Fatah in Gaza: "By electing figures linked to Fatah, voters appear to be seeking unrestricted international support for municipal governance and a gradual political shift that could extend beyond the local level."

After the elections, Fatah proclamed winning the majority of local councils and forming 197 municipal and village councils by consensus in coordination with national factions and local institutions.

== Formal inputs ==
=== Timeline range ===
The voter registration process, also subject to observation, took place in January. Registrants must be:

- of Palestinian nationality
- aged 17 or older (born on or before January 24, 2009)
- a resident of the local authority of registration for at least six months before the election
- of full legal capacity

Individuals applied for registration online via the Central Elections Commission website, in person at a voter registration center, or at a District Electoral Office (with exceptions).

The fifteen-member Election Cases Court was created on December 25, 2025, by presidential decree-law.

The Central Elections Commission describes the electoral process in five stages.

Registration stage	Exhibition & challenges stage	Nomination stage	Electoral campaigning stage	Polling day
January 20–24	February 7–9	February 23 – March 1	April 10–23	April 25
5 days	3 days	7 days	14 days	1 day

=== Council seats by locality type ===
The Ministry of Local Government published a list of localities for which elections are scheduled by council type and number of seats, in addition to summary seat counts by governorate and council type.

District	Number of local authorities by classification						
District	Municipal Council				Village Council (9 seats)	Total Number of Local Authorities	Total Number of Seats
District	Class A (15 seats)	Class B (13 seats)	Class C (11 seats)	Total	Village Council (9 seats)	Total Number of Local Authorities	Total Number of Seats
Jerusalem (Note: According to the Central Elections Commission: "Data pertains to the J2 communities of Jerusalem, given that Kufr ‘Aqab is divided between J1 and J2.")	0	2	17	19	10	29	303
Jenin	1	4	11	16	54	70	674
Tulkarem	1	2	9	12	18	30	302
Tubas	1	1	1	3	11	14	138
Nablus	1	2	8	11	46	57	543
Qalqilya	1	0	4	5	22	27	257
Salfit	1	0	8	9	9	18	184
Ramallah and Al-Bireh	2	6	12	20	51	71	699
Jericho	1	0	2	3	5	8	82
Bethlehem	1	2	11	14	23	37	369
Hebron	1	14	9	24	35	59	611
Northern Gaza	1	2	1	4	0	4	52
Gaza	1	0	3	4	0	4	48
Deir Al-Balah	1	4	2	7	0	7	89
Khan Younis	1	3	3	7	0	7	87
Rafah	1	0	2	3	0	3	37
West Bank total	11	33	92	136	284	420	4162
Gaza Strip total	5	9	11	25	0	25	313
Total	16	42	103	161	284	445	4475

Note from the Central Elections Commission: "Refugee camps in the Gaza Strip[...] are listed under the municipalities and participate in local elections, therefore, [they were] added as communities affiliated with their surrounding local authorities. There are 8 refugee camps in the Gaza Strip (4 in Deir Al-Balah, and 1 in each of the other [governorates]."

=== Religious seat allocation ===
A presidential decree-law issued on January 11, 2026, mandating religious quotas for certain municipalities. Mayoral seats are indirectly elected from within the councils themselves.

Local authority	Christian seats	Muslim seats	Mayoral seat
Ramallah Municipality	8	7	Christian
Bethlehem Municipality	8	7	Christian
Beit Sahur Municipality	10	3	Christian
Beit Jala Municipality	10	3	Christian
Berzeit Municipality	7	6	Christian
Az Zababida Municipality	7	4	Christian
'Abud Village Council	5	4	Christian
'Jifna Village Council	7	2	Christian
'Ein 'Arik Village Council	5	4	Christian
Birqin Municipality	1	10	Muslim
Jericho Municipality	1	14	Muslim
