= Chapter XV of the United Nations Charter =

Division of the United Nations

Chapter XV of the United Nations Charter deals with the UN Secretariat. It designates the UN secretary-general as the chief administrative officer of the organization, which includes the staff of ECOSOC, the Trusteeship Council, and other organs. Chapter XV is analogous to Article 6 of the Covenant of the League of Nations.

== Article 98 ==
Similarly to how the Constitution of the United States requires the US president to deliver a State of the Union address to the US Congress, Article 98 of the UN Charter requires the secretary-general to "make an annual report to the General Assembly on the work of the Organization."

== Article 99 ==
Article 99 empowers the secretary-general to "bring to the attention of the Security Council any matter which in his opinion may threaten the maintenance of international peace and security". It is rarely invoked. Some of the times it has been invoked include:

- 1960: Invoked by Dag Hammarskjöld in regards to the Congo Crisis, leading to 20,000 UN peacekeepers being deployed there.
- 1971: Invoked by U Thant in regards to the Bangladesh Liberation War and its potential spread to the entire Indian subcontinent.
- 1979: Invoked by Kurt Waldheim in regards to the Iran hostage crisis following the Iranian Revolution.
- 1989: Invoked by Javier Pérez de Cuéllar in regards to the War of Liberation (1989–1990) in Lebanon, resulting in a UN fact-finding mission.
- 2023: Invoked by António Guterres during the Gaza war, warning of a "humanitarian catastrophe" in Gaza and calling for a ceasefire.

Kofi Annan expressed reservations about using Article 99, because it can make the secretary-general take a political role instead of an administrative one.

== Article 100 ==
Article 100 stipulates the independence and impartiality of the secretary-general and other staff members, stating that they "shall not seek or receive instructions from any government or from any other [external] authority". Similarly, it requires the member states to "respect the exclusively international character of [the staff's] responsibilities" and to refrain from seeking to influence them.

== Article 101 ==
Article 101 states that the Secretary-General has the power to make employment decisions about Secretariat staff. It specifies criteria for employment at the UN, stating, "The paramount consideration in the employment of the staff and in the determination of the conditions of service shall be the necessity of securing the highest standards of efficiency, competence, and integrity. Due regard shall be paid to the importance of recruiting the staff on as wide a geographical basis as possible."
