= Basil Abdelrahman Hassan Nasser =

Palestinian politician (1966–2025)

Basil AbdelRahman Nasser
- باسل ناصر

Minister of State for Relief Affairs
- In office 31 March 2024 – 20 January 2025
- Prime Minister: Mohammad Mustafa
- Preceded by: Office established
- Succeeded by: Samah Hamad (acting)

Personal details
- Born: 16 February 1966 Jabalia refugee camp, Egyptian-administered Gaza Strip
- Died: 20 January 2025 (aged 58) Amman, Jordan
- Education: Islamic University of Gaza (BBA); University of Manchester (MM)
- Occupation: Academic

Basil AbdelRahman Nasser (Arabic: باسل ناصر; 16 February 1966 – 20 January 2025) was a Palestinian politician. He served as minister of state for relief affairs from 2024 to 2025.

Nasser died following complications from surgery in Ramallah, on 20 January 2025, at the age of 58.
