= Salah al-Bardawil =

Palestinian politician (1959–2025)

- صلاح البردويل
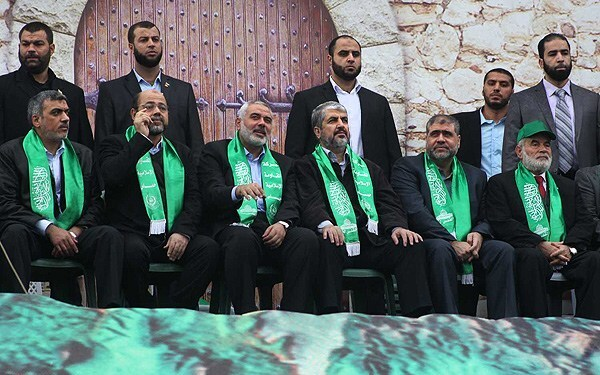
- Anniversary of Hamas (2012). Al-Bardawil standing top left

Member of the Palestinian Legislative Council for Khan Yunis Governorate
- In office 18 February 2006 – 23 March 2025

Personal details
- Born: 24 August 1959 Khan Yunis, Egyptian-administered Gaza Strip, Palestine
- Died: 23 March 2025 (aged 65) Khan Yunis, Palestine
- Party: Hamas
- Education: Cairo University; Institute of Arab Research and Studies
- Occupation: Politician; spokesperson

Salah al-Bardawil (Arabic: صلاح البردويل, 24 August 1959 – 23 March 2025) was a Palestinian politician, a senior member of Hamas' political bureau and a spokesperson for the organization until 2025. He also served as a member at the Palestinian Legislative Council for Khan Yunis Governorate from 2006 to 2025.

Al-Bardawil was born in refugee camp in Khan Younis, and joined Hamas in 1987. In 1993 he was detained by Israel.

Al-Bardawil was often quoted in Western media as a source for the views and pronouncements of Hamas. In March 2018, he told Quds News Network that Hamas was prepared to enter into dialogue with the United States. This statement angered the Palestinian Authority (PA) and Fatah, who believed Hamas wanted to be seen as the main representative of Palestinians. Al-Bardawil had previously stated in 2017 that Palestinian reconciliation efforts were failing due to U.S. pressure.

Following the decision by the United States to move its embassy from Tel Aviv to Jerusalem and the killings of Palestinian protesters that followed in May 2018, al-Bardawil was quoted by numerous sources as stating that 50 out of 62 people killed by IDF soldiers had been Hamas members. This followed a statement from Israeli forces that 50 out of the 62 Palestinians killed during protests on the Gaza border were activists, and a statement from Islamic Jihad that three of the 62 deaths were members of its military wing.

As part of the Gaza war, Al-Bardawil and his wife were killed in an Israeli drone airstrike on his tent west of Khan Yunis on 23 March 2025. He was 65.
