= Wael Al Zard =

Palestinian Islamic preacher (1972–2023)

- وائل محيي الدين سيد الزرد
- Born: Wael Mohieddin Sayyed Al Zard; 24 December 1972; Gaza City, Gaza Strip, Palestine
- Died: 13 October 2023 (aged 50); Gaza City, Gaza Strip, Palestine
- Occupations: Islamic preacher; university professor

Wael Mohieddin Sayyed Al Zard (Arabic: وائل محيي الدين سيد الزرد; 24 December 1972 – 13 October 2023) was a Palestinian Islamic preacher and university professor and Hamas leader.

== Biography ==
Al Zard graduated from high school in 1990–1991. He obtained a bachelor’s degree in fundamentals of religion in 1995. He represented the State of Palestine in the Quran memorization competition in Mecca in 1997. He obtained a master’s degree in The Noble Hadith in 2001 from the Islamic University of Gaza, and his master’s thesis was entitled "Manifestations of Ignorance as Conceived by the Texts of the Prophet’s Sunnah." He obtained a doctorate from Ain Shams University in coordination with Al-Aqsa University in the joint program. He was a university professor at the University College of Applied Sciences, and previously worked at Al-Quds Open University and the Islamic University in Gaza. He was the imam of the Grand Al-Omari Mosque in Gaza City, and the station mosque in the Al-Dair neighborhood.

== Personal life and death ==
Al Zard was married with eight children. He died on 13 October 2023, two days after being admitted to the intensive care unit, after his home in Gaza City was targeted by Israeli aircraft during the Gaza war.
