= Abdul Jawad Salih =

Palestinian politician (1931–2025)

Abdul Jawad Salih (Arabic: عبد الجواد صالح 3 December 1931 – 23 August 2025) was a Palestinian politician.

== Life and work ==
Salih was born in Al-Bireh on 3 December 1931. He was educated at the American University in Cairo. Salih was a member of the Palestinian Central Council and the Executive Committee of the Palestine Liberation Organization (PLO) between 1974 and 1982, the first Minister of Agriculture in the governments of the Palestinian National Authority, and an elected member of the first Palestinian Legislative Council in 1996 with 29,445 votes. He was mayor of the city of Al-Bireh for more than 20 years.

Salih died on 23 August 2025, at the age of 93.
