= Adeeb Naser =

Palestinian poet (1939–2026)

Adeeb Nasser (28 June 1939 – 27 February 2026) was a Palestinian poet.

== Life and career ==
Nasser joined the American University in Cairo in 1959 and then the American University of Beirut in 1965. He has worked in the field of radio in Ramallah, Amman, Cairo, Jeddah, Beirut and Baghdad. He was the president of the Palestinian Writers and Journalists Union in Iraq, a member of the General Union of Arab Writers, a member of the Jordanian Writers Association, and a member of the Iraqi Journalists Syndicate and the General Union of Writers in Iraq until the American occupation.

Naser died on 27 February 2026.
