= Battle of Be'erot Yitzhak =

1948 Arab–Israeli War battle

Coordinates: 31°27′54.99″N 34°30′25.3″E

- Part of 1948 Arab–Israeli War
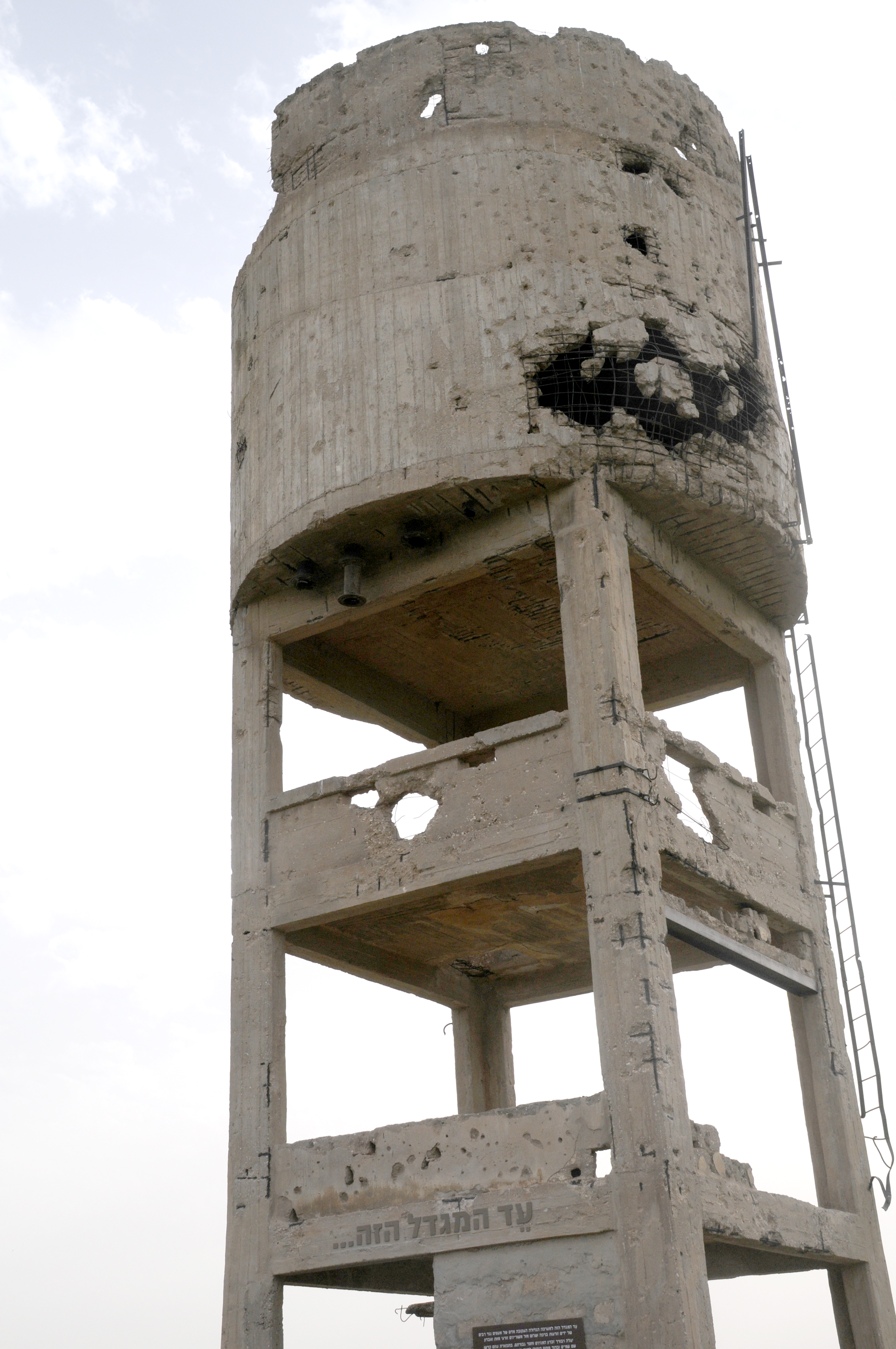
- The damaged water tower in Be'erot Yitzhak, 15 February 2012
Date	July 15, 1948
Location	Present-day Nahal Oz, Israel
Result	Israeli victory

Belligerents
Israel (IDF)	Egypt

Commanders and leaders
Shimon Forsher (local); Simcha Shiloni (reinforcements)	

Strength
65 men, 20 women (defenders) section of two 65 mm Napoleonchik field cannons, 9 jeeps, 6 half-tracks (reinforcements)	Reinforced battalion

Casualties and losses
17 killed, 15 wounded	~170–200 killed and wounded

The Battle of Be'erot Yitzhak was a military engagement between the Israel Defense Forces and Egyptian army in the 1948 Arab–Israeli War. It was fought on July 15, 1948, in the ten-day period between the first and second truces of the war.

The Egyptian army, after unsuccessful attacks on Negba on July 12 and Gal On on July 14, assaulted the lightly defended outlying Negev village Be'erot Yitzhak. They managed to penetrate the village perimeter, but the Israelis concentrated in an inner position in the village, and fought off the Egyptian advance until reinforcements arrived and drove out the attackers.

== Background ==
Be'erot Yitzhak was a kibbutz founded in 1943 on the site of today's Alumim and Nahal Oz by immigrants from Czechoslovakia and Germany of the HaPoel HaMizrachi movement. Originally an isolated settlement, it served as a staging point for the founding of three new villages as part of the 11 points in the Negev plan—Kfar Darom, Be'eri and Tkuma. In the first stage of the 1948 Arab–Israeli War, the Jewish settlements in the Negev desert were put under the command of the Negev Brigade, with Be'erot Yitzhak falling under the jurisdiction of the 2nd Battalion.

Upon termination of the British mandate, the Egyptian army, along with those of several other Arab states, immediately invaded Israel on May 15, 1948. The mothers and children of Be'erot Yitzhak were evacuated the next day, leaving behind about 90 workers and paramilitaries, around 30 of them women. On that day, two Egyptian companies attempted an assault on the village, but turned back after fire was exchanged with the Israelis.

Throughout May 1948, Egypt's main force advanced north to the Ad Halom bridge, where it halted after the Israeli Operation Pleshet on June 2–3. Another wing of the Egyptian military positioned itself on the Majdal – Bayt Jibrin road and cut off the Israeli-held northern Negev from the rest of the country. Along its main advance path, Egypt succeeded in taking Nitzanim, and Yad Mordechai and Kfar Darom were evacuated by the Israelis. During this period, numerous Jewish villages in the Negev were subject to constant Egyptian air and artillery harassment, Be'erot Yitzhak being one of them, suffering the hits of approximately 5,000 shells.

Egypt took the initiative and attacked numerous Israeli positions on July 8, one day before the first truce was meant to expire. The Israelis, for their part, launched the planned Operation An-Far to reconnect the Negev with the rest of Israel. After failing to capture Negba on July 12, and taking heavy casualties, the Egyptians turned their attention to more isolated settlements and positions. On July 14, they sent volunteer units to attack Gal On, which had been used by Israel for raids on the Majdal – Bayt Jibrin road and on Bayt Jibrin itself. The attackers met with a minefield and were repelled by the residents of Gal On. Be'erot Yitzhak was seen as a threat to the Egyptian communication, and was attacked next.

== Battle ==
=== Battle in the village ===
The Egyptian attack started at 05:30 on July 15, when its Spitfires made a run on the northern part of the kibbutz, and an artillery barrage followed. The attack came as a complete surprise to the Israelis, who had been busy setting up fortifications. Some of them went to sleep as late as 05:00, a half-hour before the first air raid. At 08:15, Egypt's 3rd Infantry Battalion, reinforced by about 70 tanks and armored vehicles, hit the village's outer positions from the north-northwest. Another force attacked from the southern area and the western gate, but withdrew after being hit by 3" (81 mm) mortar fire.

A shell ignited flammable materials, damaged the northwestern position and killed the four Israelis manning it. The incessant shelling also caused damage to the village's water tower. Approximately 100 m^{3} in volume, it burst open at about 10:00 and flooded defensive trenches and munitions, also hurting communications. All of the 3" mortar rounds were put out of commission. At 10:25, some 100 Egyptian infantrymen breached the fence there, using a small opening that had been used by the locals, and captured three outlying structures, including the nursery school. Hearing of the situation, Haim Bar-Lev, serving as the acting commander of the Negev Brigade due to the injury of Nahum Sarig, ordered Israel Carmi (commander of the 9th Battalion) to send reinforcements.

As a result of the breach, the Israeli commander, Shimon Forsher, ordered all residents to retreat to an inner defensive perimeter. At this stage, the Egyptians took control of another line of structures, and entered a stalemate with the Israelis about 30 m away from the inner perimeter. At 10:40 Be'erot Yitzhak reported that its fences had been breached from three directions and were within range of hand grenades. The Israeli commander was wounded, and his deputy was killed. In a battle for the nursery school, an Israeli PIAT managed to drive out the Egyptian soldiers. Another building was also hit by a PIAT, making the Egyptians withdraw. Despite the successful counterattack, at 11:15 the village reported that its situation was critical and they would surrender in half an hour if help would not come. This was repeated at least twice more during the battle.

The Egyptians took time to regroup for a final assault on the villages inner defenses, bringing reinforcements. During this reprieve, the defenders repaired the mortars and PIAT that were damaged by the flood and the dust, and made a series of raids on Egypt-held structures. At 14:00, the Egyptians counterattacked but were met with heavy fire and took many casualties. This prompted the Israelis to move their only working communications device to a safer location, but it broke down, and contact with the brigade HQ was only restored at 16:00. At 17:00, the villagers again reported that their situation was critical, and that an attempted counterattack failed. The Negev Brigade intelligence officer, David Niv, intercepted an Egyptian radio message where the commander of the assault claimed to have already taken the village.

=== Movement of the Israeli reinforcements ===
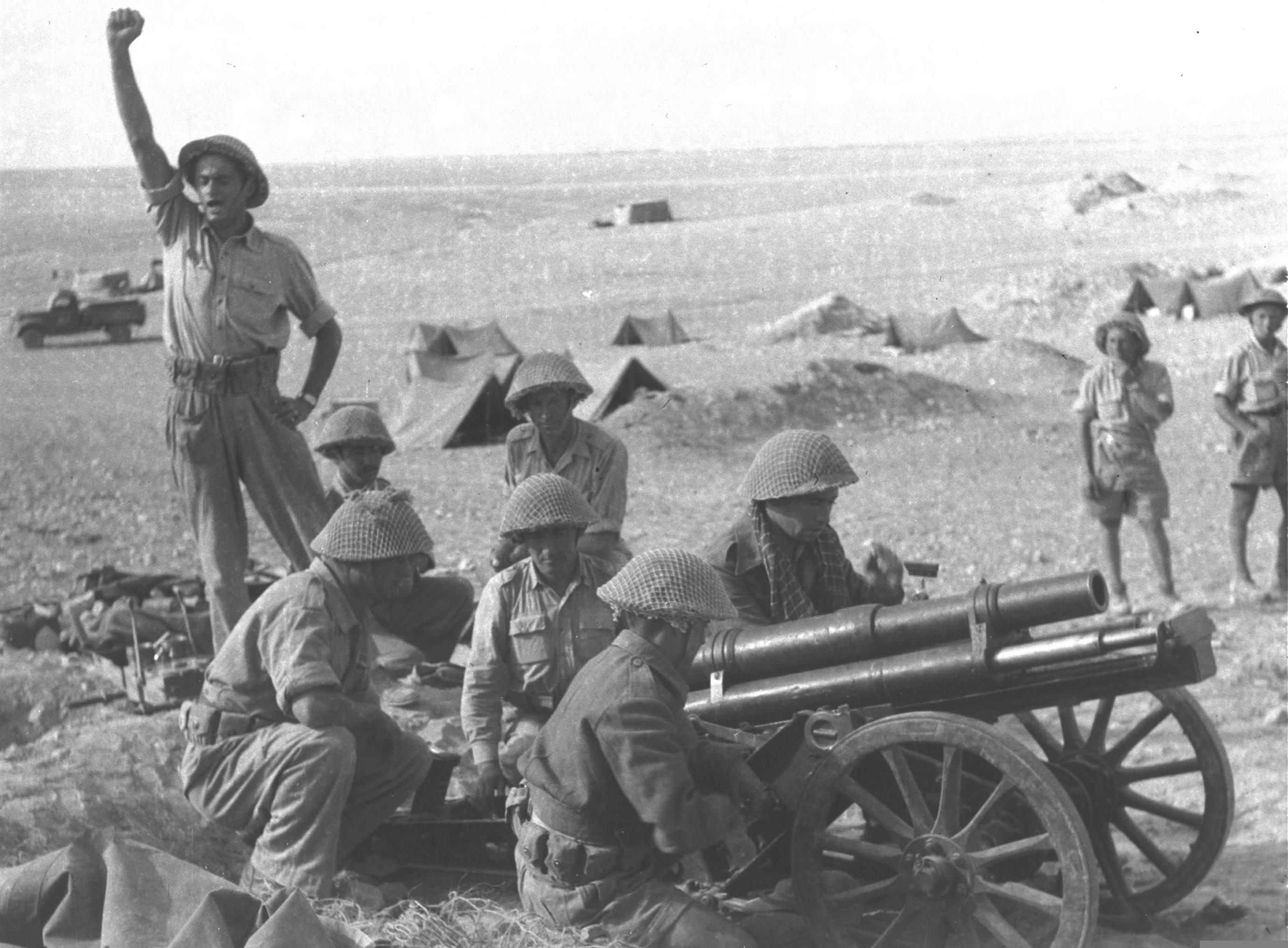
"Napoleonchik" cannon in action. Beersheba area, 1948

Israel's own reinforcements from the Negev Brigade's 9th Battalion were on their way in the meantime. They consisted of a section of two 65 mm Napoleonchik field cannons brought from Ruhama under Yoel Ya'uri, and 9 jeeps and 6 half-tracks under Simha Shiloni. The forces left Ruhama at 13:00 for the planned staging point at the brigade headquarters at Dorot. Closing in on Be'erot Yitzhak, the Israeli 9th Battalion forces became the target of Egyptian aerial and artillery attacks, especially when they reached Wadi Hanoun, relieving the kibbutz.

In light of these developments, Shiloni decided that he could only advanced the cannons to the vicinity of Be'erot Yitzhak. He and Ya'uri took a jeep to reconnoiter for a suitable firing location. They were forced to continue on foot after being attacked by Egyptian aircraft. Shiloni found a location need kibbutz Sa'ad and also estimated that the Egyptians would be concentrated about 150 m west of Be'erot Yitzhak. At about 17:30, the Israeli cannons began shelling Egypt's armor concentration. One of the first shells scored a direct hit on the armor in the north of the village, and another missed its target, but accidentally hit the path of incoming Egyptian reinforcements, which then turned back. The shelling, which continued almost uninterrupted (it stopped only when Egypt's aircraft fired at the artillery), triggered a general retreat. The last Egyptian forces to retreat were the infantry, who were hit by Israeli fire from Be'erot Yitzhak.

== Aftermath ==
In all, 17 Israelis were killed and 15 wounded. The Egyptians had an estimated 200 casualties. Egypt did not attack Be'erot Yitzhak again, or indeed any other Israeli villages for the remainder of the war. The battle was in fact one of the war's last Egyptian offensive initiatives.

Egypt made a last-minute attempt to isolate Be'erot Yitzhak however, by capturing a position connecting it to Sa'ad in the northeast on July 18. The Negev Brigade responded by capturing an adjacent position, just before the second truce of the war went into effect. Be'erot Yitzhak was severely damaged in the battle, and was abandoned by its residents. They re-founded the kibbutz to the south of Petah Tikva in 1952, where it has remained to this day. The first Nahal settlement, Nahal Oz, was founded in 1951 on the lands of the original Be'erot Yitzhak.
