= Meir Shamir =

Israeli businessman

- מאיר שמיר
- Born: September 19, 1951 (age 74); Be'erot Yitzhak, Israel
- Education: Bar-Ilan University
- Occupation(s): Businessman, investor, and philanthropist
- Spouse: Adina Shamir
- Children: 3

Meir Shamir (Hebrew: מאיר שמיר) is an Israeli businessman, investor, and philanthropist. He is currently the chief executive officer and main shareholder of Mivtach Shamir Holdings Ltd., an Israeli holding company.

Beyond the realm of business, Shamir has also been an active philanthropist and since 2012, has served as the Head of "Taglit Israel" (Birthright Israel).

== Early life and education ==
Shamir was born in 1951 in Kibbutz Be'erot Yitzhak and relocated to Petah Tikva with his family upon turning five years old, where he was later raised and educated. In 1969, Shamir joined the Israel Defence Forces (IDF) as a Navigator in the 69 Squadron ("Hammers") of the Israeli Air Force, and took part in the Yom Kippur War. After completing his military service, he earned a BA in Management, Business Administration and Economics from Bar-Ilan University.

== Career ==
Aninsurance broker by profession, Shamir began working prior to embarking on a business career. In 1981, Shamir's business career was launched, when at the age of 30, he purchased 50% of the company's shares and changed its name to Mivtach Shamir Holdings Ltd. In 1992, Shamir went on to purchase the remaining shares of the company, thus becoming the holding company's sole owner and corporate director. In the following years, Shamir sold the company's insurance business, turning it into an internationally active holding and investment company that invests mainly in technology and communications, real estate and industrial manufacturing.

Shamir's holding company, Mivtach Shamir Ltd. operates throughout Israel and in other countries, investing in the fields of industrial manufacturing, high-technology and communications, real estate, provides private equity and venture capital, with a special focus on medical, biotechnology and biotechnology companies.

In 2007, Mivtach Shamir invested $15 million in TVJ (Tower Vision Jersey), an Indian telecommunications infrastructure provider. Two months later, Mivtach Real Estate, which is a subsidiary of Mivtach Shamir, invested $13 million worth of commercial property and real estate in Chennai, India as part of an investment group that placed $30 million into the real estate development project. The aim of the investment was to build offices, hotels, commercial centers and other complexes over 2.25 million sqm of the city. According to the signed agreement, in exchange for their investment, Mivtach would receive 32% of the project's shares.

In 2015, Shamir's holding company invested $7 million in a promising Israeli information security start-up named Nyotron. Mivtach Shamir also held a 21% stake in the Israeli food company Tnuva Group, and played a crucial part in its acquisition by the Chinese food manufacturer Bright Food in 2015, a deal which netted Shamir €252 million in profit.

In 2009 he received an honorary degree from the Bar Ilan University "in recognition of his pivotal role in Israel's business sector…and his generous support of underprivileged university students." He has served on the university's board of trustees since 2005, contributed to the Bible Studies Department and funded student scholarships.

Shamir has been head of the presidency of Taglit Israel since 2012.

=== Corporate contribution ===
In 2015 Mivtach Shamir donated a state-of-the-art ambulance to the ZAKA emergency response teams in Petah Tikva.

The company has sponsored several IDF units and battalions and funded their recreational activities as part of the Association for the Wellbeing of Israel's Soldiers (AWIS) Adoption project – Ametz Lohem (adopt a soldier).

=== Hapoel Petah Tikva ===
Meir Shamir was the owner of the football club Hapoel Petah Tikva F.C., sold the stadium and disappeared with the money.

== Personal details ==
Meir Shamir is married to professor Adina Shamir of the Bar Ilan University. They have three children.

His personal net worth is estimated at $150 million.
