= Schönbein =

Schönbein is a German surname. Notable people with the surname include:

- Christian Friedrich Schönbein (1799–1868), German-Swiss chemist
- Irene Schönbein, wife of Josef Mengele

== See also ==
- 19992 Schönbein, a main belt asteroid
- Samuel Sheinbein (born 1980), American convicted murderer
