= Tower Vision =

Tower management company

Tower Vision India Pvt. Ltd.
- Industry: Telecommunications
- Founded: 2006; New Delhi, India
- Headquarters: Gurugram, India
- Website: tower-vision.com

Tower Vision is a tower management company offering passive infrastructure to the telecoms industry on a multi-tenancy basis. Founded in New Delhi in 2006, Tower Vision is a subsidiary of Fore Group Management & Investments Ltd. Tower Vision operates in 16 telecoms circles with 7,500+ towers.

Key board members include Steven G. Fisher from Quadrangle and Edward Sippel from TA Associates Management.

In 2010, Quadrangle Capital Partners led a consortium to invest up to $300 million in Tower Vision. Other investors include the Israel-based Fore Group and Mivtach Shamir (Meir Shamir) Real Estate. In 2011, they received a $700 million acquisition offer for Tower Vision, but turned it down.

In 2014, RJIL, the telecom division of Reliance Industries Limited signed an agreement with Tower Vision to utilize their infrastructure for their 4G network.

In 2016, Bharti Infratel showed interest in acquiring Tower Vision India, but in January 2017, it was reported that a number of private equity firms were vying for a controlling stake in Tower Vision. Axis Capital Partners and Kotak Mahindra Capital were given the mandate to find buyers.
