= Israel Infrastructure Fund =

Israel Infrastructure Fund Ltd.
- Industry: Private equity fund
- Founded: 2007
- Key people: CEO: Yaron Kastembaum
- Products: Infrastructure investments
- Owner: Yehuda Raveh 40% Harel Investments 40% Yaron Kastembaum 20%
- Website: http://www.iif.co.il/

Israel Infrastructure Fund (IIF) is a private equity fund specializing in infrastructure investments. The fund was established in 2007 by Harel Insurance Investments and attorney Yehuda Raveh and is jointly owned by Harel Insurance, Yehuda Raveh through his controlled company STG, and Yaron Kastembaum.

IIF primarily invests in infrastructure projects in Israel, including water, energy, logistics, roads, and transportation. Its total investments amount to approximately $3 billion, executed through three funds and co-investments.

== Holdings ==
=== Roads ===
As part of its transport infrastructure investments, IIF acquired 75% ownership of Derech Eretz, the company responsible for constructing, maintaining, and operating Highway 6 in 2012 from Africa Israel, Shikun & Binui, and Canadian Highways.

IIF also owns 75% of Netivei HaYovel, the company that operates and maintains Route 431, which connects Ayalon South to Modi'in-Maccabim-Re'ut.

=== Transportation ===
In the transportation sector, IIF invested in a 50% stake in CityPass, the company that operated the Jerusalem Light Rail until the concession was transferred to Kfir on April 16, 2021.

Additionally, IIF holds an investment in Swiss port, which provides cargo services at Ben Gurion Airport.

=== Seawater Desalination ===
IIF owns Via Maris, a company specializing in desalination, which operates the Palmachim desalination plant, producing approximately 100 million cubic meters of desalinated water annually. The fund also has investments in Tower Vision, which owns around 10,000 wireless telecom infrastructure towers in India.

=== Energy ===
IIF's energy holdings include a 20% stake in Dalia Power Energies, an independent power plant near Kfar Menahem that generates approximately 900 MW using natural gas as part of clean energy initiatives. The fund has also acquired a stake in the Tamar gas field.

IIF is a shareholder in Ella Power Energies, which operates power plants, and has invested in East Mediterranean Gas Company (EMG), which purchases natural gas from Egypt and supplies it to Eastern Mediterranean countries via the El Arish-Ashkelon pipeline.

The fund also holds a 50% stake in Win Energy, a company specializing in the development and operation of wind energy power plants in Europe.

=== Telecommunications ===
In December 2018, IIF joined the Unlimited fiber-optic network project, acquiring a 35% stake alongside Cellcom (35%) and Israel Electric Corporation (30%).

In September 2020, HOT Telecommunication Systems joined the project, reducing IIF's stake to 23.33%.
