= Metzada Unit =

- יחידה מצדה
- Active: 2003–present
- Country: Israel
- Branch: Israel Prison Service
- Type: Police tactical unit

Metzada Unit (Hebrew: יחידת מצדה) is the Israel Prison Service (IPS) tactical unit tasked with detection and arrest of escaped prisoners, hostage rescue, special operations, support operation for other IPS units during raids at correctional facilities, tactical prison riot, and VIP protection. The Metzada Unit is one of five hostage rescue units in Israel.

The unit operates during complex occurrences that take place within the correctional facilities all over the country. The unit is nationwide and is directly subordinate to the IPS chief of operations.

Since 2006 the Metzada Unit is also subordinate to the IDF General Staff and participates in IDF missions subject to the approval of the IPS Commissioner. Metzada unit specializes in working with non-lethal weapons. Unit's instructors consult and assist on the subject for all Israeli Defense Community.

== Responsibilities ==
1. Hostage rescue
  - Hostage rescue in IPS correctional facilities.
  - Hostage rescue in IDF correctional facilities.
  - Hostage rescue in IPS prisoner transport vehicles.
2. Detection and arrest of escaped prisoners, including arrests in Israeli-occupied West Bank.
3. Other kind of IPS activities
  - Assistance for other IPS units during raids at correctional facilities.
  - Riot control at IDF and IPS correctional facilities.
  - Human intelligence (intelligence gathering) by various methods.
4. Assistance to the IDF and Israel Police in operational activities.

== Organization and structure ==
The Metzada Unit is nationwide and directly subordinate to the chief of operations of the IPS. The unit's operators are IPS personnel on payroll with experience from their military service in Israel Defense Forces combat units.

Recruitment requirements are: Service in an IDF combat unit (minimum mandatory training level of Rifleman 08), sergeant/officer course graduate and high level of physical fitness. The selection process includes a number of long physical and psychological tests. In the end of the process only the few candidates proceed to Metzada operator training course, which takes place in the unit's training center. Overall, only one percent of candidates become Metzada operators.

After the completion of a six-month course, the unit members are divided into sections. The unit is formed of two major sections: takeover and the break in. The takeover section specializes in aspects related to any takeover, including the takeover of cells within the prison or a prisoner transport vehicles. The break in section specializes in deployment of explosives and door breaching.

At the sections, the operators specialize in various professions: roping, breach and entry, K-9, sniping, negotiation, etc.

== History ==
The Metzada Unit was established in 2003 by IPS Commissioner Yaakov Ganot as a response to increased level of personnel assaults and hostage kidnapping attempts performed by prisoners during that period. Until 2003 there was no hostage rescue unit in the IPS, so in case of emergency situations it would have to depend on other organizations, such as Israel Police and the IDF.

Since 2006, the Metzada Unit is also subordinate to the IDF General Staff and is responsible for hostage rescue in military prisons.

== Published operational record (2003–today) ==
- April 2004, during prisoner riot at Nafha prison one of the officers was taken hostage. Metzada unit prepared to entry, but the hostage was released by IPS negotiators.
- November 2005, the Metzada unit took over an apartment in Petah Tikva and arrested an escaped prisoner.
- May 2006, escaped prisoner arrested in Nablus, during joint operation of Metzada unit, IDF and Israel Security Agency.
- September 2006, during the operation Autumn Clouds in Gaza Strip Metzada unit was part in building takeover occupied by large group of terrorists.
- April 2007, in Ofek prison three 17 year old prisoners barricaded inside their cell holding knives and threatened to commit suicide. After negotiation failure Metzada team took over the cell and successfully neutralized the prisoners - no casualties.
- October 2007, a major riot occurred in Ktziot prison with 15 IPS employees injured. Metzada unit succeeded to suppress the riot. During the operation a prisoner was fatally injured and later died in the hospital.
- May 2008, escaped prisoner arrested in Kabatya, during joint operation of Metzada unit, IDF and Israel Security Agency.
- May 2010, Metzada unit assisted Israeli Navy during the Gaza flotilla raid.
- October 2013, Metzada operators arrested escaped murderer Mahmoud Sharaf in Nablus.
- February 2014, in Rimonim Prison, a prisoner Samuel Sheinbein pulled out a handgun, and shot three guards, seriously injuring two of them, before barricading himself in the bathroom. Metzada unit arrived and took positions. Unit's paramedic started to provide a medical help to wounded guards. A standoff ensued, during which authorities attempted to negotiate with him. After an hour, Sheinbein shot at Metzada team and they returned fire, seriously wounding him. Despite attempts to resuscitate him, Sheinbein died soon afterward. Six officials and one prisoner were wounded by Sheinbein. Three Metzada operators and a unit's paramedic were awarded with a Medal of Distinguished Service.
- June 2014, during the operation Brother's Keeper Metzada unit operated in Nablus area, assisting IDF in searches and arrests.
- July 2014, during the operation Protective Edge Metzada unit assists Gaza Division of IDF.
- August 2016, Metzada unit took over cells with 250 Hamas prisoners in Nafha and Eshel prisons, preventing attack planned by Hamas.
- On October 7th, 2023, during the October 7 attacks, a force from the Metzada Unit assisted in the defense of kibbutz Alumim from Hamas fighters during the Alumim massacre.

== See also ==
Other Israeli hostage rescue units:

- Yamam – Israel Police takeover unit
- Sayeret Matkal – IDF takeover unit
- Shayetet 13 – Israeli Navy takeover unit
- LOTAR Eilat – Eilat area IDF takeover unit
