= Zvi Galor =

Israeli academic

- צבי גלאור
- Born: 1939 (age 86–87); Kfar Vitkin, Israel
- Education: Tel Aviv University; Hebrew University of Jerusalem; Bar-Ilan University
- Scientific career
- Workplaces: International Institute of the Histadrut

Dr. Zvi Galor (Hebrew: צבי גלאור; born in 1939), is an Israeli expert on cooperatives.

== Biography ==
Born in 1939 in Kfar Vitkin, Zvi Galor earned his bachelor's degree from Tel Aviv University in 1966. In 1987 he obtained his master's degree from the Hebrew University of Jerusalem, graduating with honors, and in 2017, at the age of 78, received his doctoral degree from Bar-Ilan University in Ramat-Gan. From 1980 to 2002, Galor served as the pedagogical director of the English and French internships at the International Institute for Labour, Development and Cooperative Studies in Tel Aviv (ILDEC), which in 1994 became part of the International Institute of the Histadrut. This institute provides trainees from countries all over the world with advanced training sessions in cooperative management and development. In 1996 Zvi Galor became the institute's academic director, In this position he initiated dozens of pedagogical overseas missions in situ, organizing training courses run by the institute's instructors directly in the students' country of origin. These projects took place in Africa, Asia, Europe, South America and Oceania.

== Development activities ==
From 1976 to 1978, Galor participated in the establishment of a moshav in the Jordan Valley. He was also a member of Moshav Kfar Vitkin's Executive Committee from 1978 to 1980. Since his retirement, Galor has been involved in the creation of many cooperative projects in both developing and developed countries working mainly as a consultant. His writings and research have served as a guideline for these projects, particularly for the creation of cooperatives in rural areas and the development of these regions.

== Research activities ==
Zvi Galor has developed an innovative research axis aimed at preventing the dismantling of cooperatives. These ideas were best encapsulated in the conclusions of the Seminar of Leaders of the Mauritius Cooperative Movement (Macoscle), led by Galor, as well as in the establishment of the charter of the "Oklahoma Food Cooperative Project" in Oklahoma, USA. Zvi Galor has published dozens of articles he wrote in Hebrew in English and in French, some of which were even translated into Spanish, Arabic, Indonesian and Vietnamese

== Principles developed by Zvi Galor ==
- The cooperative is created by its founding members, and is the exclusive property of the members.
- The cooperative is established in order to serve its members optimally and at the lowest possible cost.
- The value of the common property is equal to the sum of the shares held by the members of the cooperative.
- Cooperatives strive to operate at cost price, i.e. they do not generate any profits or losses. Any profits or surpluses are distributed equitably among members in the current year, based on their participation. Occasional losses are covered by all members according to their participation.

== Study of "decooperativisation" ==
Zvi Galor studied the problems arising from the dismantling of cooperative structures (decooperativisation), both in developing and developed countries. He focused in particular on the reasons that led to the dismantling of two Israeli cooperatives that had been in existence for a relatively long period: Tnuva and Hamashbir Hamerkazi. Tnuva is an example of a secondary cooperative. For the 80 years of its existence, it served as a platform for the marketing of dairy and agricultural products. It comprised all the moshavim and kibbutzim in Israel.

=== Factors that lead to the dismantling of a cooperative ===
Galor found that the following situations lead to the dismantling of a cooperative:

- A cooperative whose members have mostly stopped using the services it offers is more exposed to the risk of decooperation.
- A cooperative whose shares are held at nominal value recognizes the risk that its members will demand for themselves the unallocated collective value of the structure.
- A cooperative whose members are not always aware of the real value of their cooperative equity, the assets of which they are seeking to sell. Potential buyers often finance the cost of buying a cooperative by reselling its assets.

== See also ==
- Tnuva
- Agricultural cooperative
- Cooperative
- Kibbutz
- Moshav
