= Mivtach Shamir Holdings =

Israeli Investment and holdings company

Mivtach Shamir Holdings Ltd.
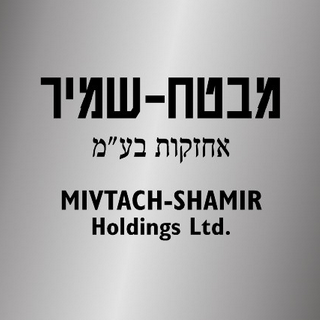
- Traded as: TASE: MISH
- Industry: Public company, venture capital
- Founded: 1958; 68 years ago
- Founder: Meir Shamir
- Headquarters: Israel
- Key people: Meir Shamir (CEO); Yehezkel Dovrat (Chairman)
- Services: Venture capital
- Revenue: 43.9 million NIS (2017)
- Website: www.msgroup.co.il

Mivtach Shamir Holdings (Hebrew: מבטח שמיר אחזקות בע"ם) is an Israeli investment company led by Meir Shamir. The company operates in three main sectors: technology and communications, industrial investments, and real estate. Shares in Mivtach Shamir are traded on the Tel Aviv Stock Exchange (TASE) as MISH.

== History ==
Mivtach Shamir Holdings was founded in 1958 as Attas Industries Halva, Tahini, and Sweets, a privately held food production manufacturing company. Attas was listed on the Tel Aviv Stock Exchange in 1983. Meir Shamir acquired a controlling share in the company, initiated a corporate restructuring, and expanded operations into the insurance and pension fund management sectors. The name of the company was changed from Attas Industries to Mivtach Shamir Holdings.

In 1999, the company acquired a 10% stake in Zen Media, an internet company. In 2001, the company sold 55.1% of Mivtach Shamir Finance to The Migdal Group for 68 million NIS.

In January 2008, Mivtach Shamir, together with Apax Partners, acquired a controlling interest in the Tnuva Group. On March 30, 2015, Mivtach announced the sale of Tnuva Food Industries Ltd. to the Chinese company Bright Food. The deal was reported to have been worth NIS 1.1 billion.

== Investments ==
As of 2018, Mivtach Shamir Holdings owned a 44.69% stake in Elbit Vision Systems Ltd. and a 5.5% stake in Gilat Satellite Networks Ltd. Other direct holdings and investments in real estate include 26.16% of Maniff Financial Services, a 42.34% investment in Hot Hasharon Towers, and 34.64% of the shares in Digel Investments and Holdings Ltd. Its industrial sector holdings include a 20% stake in Tnuva and 42% of Norphat, as well as a 16.57% stake in Solber Industries.

== Corporate social responsibility ==
Mivtach Shamir has contributed to the project "Adopt-a-Soldier" from the Association for the Wellbeing of Israel's Soldiers (AWIS) for activities for several Israel Defence Forces (IDF) battalions. The company has also provided material donations to ZAKA emergency response teams in Petah Tikva.
