= Silver Fern Farms =

New Zealand multinational meat company

- Type: Limited company
- Industry: Manufacturing, Food, livestock marketing & supply, Agribusiness
- Founded: 30 September 1948
- Headquarters: Dunedin, New Zealand
- Products: Meat
- Subsidiaries: Silver Fern (brand)
- Website: www.silverfernfarms.com

Silver Fern Farms Limited is a New Zealand multinational meat company. It is owned in equal partnership by Silver Fern Farms Co-op Ltd, a cooperative of 16,000 New Zealand sheep, cattle and deer farmers, and Shanghai Maling Aquarius Ltd. The company is New Zealand's largest livestock processing and marketing company. It has investments in manufacturing, meat processing, transport of livestock, export logistics and meat marketing, with associated companies including New Zealand and Australian Lamb Company Limited, The Lamb Co-Operative, Inc, Robotic Technologies Limited, Livestock Logistics Nationwide Limited, Kotahi Logistics LP, Ovine Automation Limited, FarmIQ Systems Ltd, Primary Collaboration NZ Ltd and the Red Meat Profit Partnership.

== History ==
Silver Fern Farms Limited was established in 1948 as the Primary Producers Cooperative Society based initially in the South Island of New Zealand as a meat marketing cooperative, predominantly of sheep. It became known as PPCS Limited but remained a minor player in the meat industry until the early 1970s when a new management team was appointed. The removal of subsidies to farmers, the New Zealand Meat Board ceding its monopoly on sheepmeat marketing, and meat processing industry over-capacity gave the cooperative opportunities to utilise its profitability built up over the previous decade.

In the 1980s, PPCS expanded from only minor processing operations by taking over meat processing cooperatives and companies in initially the South Island and later the North Island. In 1986, released asset value was returned to the farmer shareholders by the creation of a holding company, Apex Limited. Apex was a vehicle that allowed the acquisition of Canterbury Frozen Meat.

Major consolidation of the New Zealand meat industry continued through the 1990s with PPCS actively involved but not getting caught out like competitors such as AFFCO Holdings. However, in 2006 PPCS was forced to take over Hawke's Bay based Richmond Meats to resolve issues resulting from a secret investment that had commenced in the late 1990s. This saddled the cooperative with debt.

PPCS was renamed to Silver Fern Farms in 2008 based on one of its long-standing brands. A takeover by PGG Wrightson fell through due to the 2008 financial crisis. In June 2008, PGG Wrightson had made an unconditional offer to buy half of Silver Fern Farms for NZ$220 million, but in September was unable to complete the equity raising required to finance the offer and defaulted. PGG Wrightson had to pay $42 million in compensation to Silver Fern Farms and wrote off a total of $50 million for the compensation and due diligence costs.

By 2013 the cooperative had accumulated significant losses, leading to a company restructuring. The company then became profitable, reporting a net profit after tax of $15.4 million for 2017 and $70.7 million for 2019.

=== Re-organisation ===
On 1 October 2014, Silver Fern Farms Limited reorganised the business into three species-based units, creating two new 100% subsidiaries, Silver Fern Farms Beef Ltd and Silver Fern Farms Venison Ltd.

=== External investment ===
On Friday, 16 October 2015, Silver Fern Farms accepted a 50/50 partnership proposal for an investment of NZ$261 million with a subsidiary of Bright Food Group, Shanghai Maling Aquarius. The full transaction, which was subject to New Zealand and Chinese regulatory approvals, completed in late 2016. The company is now owned in equal partnership with Shanghai Maling Aquarius Co Ltd (a subsidiary of Bright Food) and Silver Fern Farms Co-op Ltd.

== Key brands ==
- Silver Fern
- Silver Fern Farms Premier Selection
- Grass-fed Premier Selection Reserve (beef)

== Processing plants ==
The company has 14 sites and processes beef, lamb and venison. The plants are at Belfast, Charlton, Dargaville, Finegand, Hāwera, Hokitika, Kennington, Te Aroha, Takapau, Pareora, Rotorua, Waitane, Waitōtara, Waitoa and Whakatu. They employ up to 6,500 people.
