= Shlomo Levin =

Israeli judge (born 1933)

- שלמה לוין
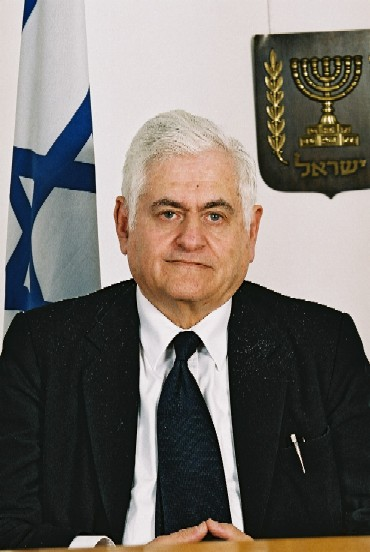

Deputy President of the Supreme Court of Israel
- In office 13 August 1995 – 22 February 2003
- Preceded by: Aharon Barak
- Succeeded by: Theodor Or

Justice of the Supreme Court of Israel
- In office 20 February 1980 – 22 February 2003

Personal details
- Born: February 22, 1933 (age 93) Riga, Latvia
- Education: Hebrew University of Jerusalem
- Religion: Judaism

Shlomo Levin (Hebrew: שלמה לוין; born February 22, 1933) is an Israeli jurist. He was a Justice (1980 - 2003) and Deputy President (1995 - 2003) of the Supreme Court of Israel.

== Biography ==
Shlomo Levin was born in Riga Latvia in 1933 to Jewish parents born in different parts of the Russian Empire. The family immigrated to Mandatory Palestine in 1937. Levin studied law at the Hebrew University of Jerusalem, obtaining an LL.M. in 1955, LL.D. in 1959, and PhD in 1969. He trained in law at the offices of attorney Yehoshua Rotenstreich and Supreme Court President Yoel Sussman. He then worked as a lawyer and lectured at the law faculty of the Hebrew University and Tel-Aviv University.

== Judicial career ==
In 1966, Levin was appointed to the Magistrate's Court in Tel Aviv and in 1975 he became a District Court Judge. In 1979 as part of his reserve duty, he served on a military tribunal that tried and acquitted Commander of the Navy Michael Barkai of rape of a female non-commissioned officer.

In 1980, Levin was appointed to the Supreme Court where he served until his retirement in 2003. In 1995 he was appointed Deputy President of the Supreme Court, where he served under President Aharon Barak.

During his term on the Supreme Court, Levin presided over or participated in adjudication of several high-profile cases such as:

- A petition demanding a trial of John Demjanjuk for suspected war crimes in the Sobibor extermination camp after his acquittal of his alleged atrocities in Treblinka.
- An appeal against the detention of several Lebanese militants, among them Mustafa Dirani and Abdel Karim Obeid after the end of their prison terms.
- Request by the Attorney General to convene a larger Supreme Court panel to consider extradition of Samuel Sheinbein to the United States to stand trial for murder.
- A petition by women to conduct prayer services at the Western Wall Plaza, while carrying Torah scrolls and wearing tallitot (prayer shawls).
- An appeal against the decision by the Central Electoral Commission barring the Kach party from participating in elections to the Knesset.
- A petition challenging the legality of the use by the General Security Agency Shin Bet of moderate physical pressure against detainees in order to save human life.

== Judicial training initiatives ==
In late 1970s, Levin proposed the creation of Israel's Institute for Advanced Judicial Studies, and later became its director. During his term on the Supreme Court, Levin played a leading role in establishing International Organization for Judicial Training (IOJT), and served as its first President.

== Books ==
- Levin, S., Law for General Public. Alon Publishing
- Levin, S., "Lehiyot Shofet" ("To Be a Judge"), Kinneret Zmora Bitan, 2009.
- Levin, S., Civil Procedure Theory - Introduction and Fundamental Principles, Perlstein Ginossar, 2008
