= Tnuva =

Israeli food company

- Type: Privately held company
- Founded: 1926; 100 years ago
- Headquarters: Petah Tikva, Israel
- Net income: 410,000,000 new shekel (2014)
- Owner: Bright Food (56%)

Tnuva, or Tenuvah, (Hebrew: תנובה, fruit or produce) is an Israeli food creation and marketing company. The company holds in Israel a significant market share in the field of drinking milk production, dairy products and its marketing. It was for its first seventy years an Israeli food processing cooperative (co-op) owned by the kibbutzim (collective farms) and moshavim (agricultural communities), and historically specializing in milk and dairy products; it was subsequently sold by its members as a limited company and, since 2014, has been controlled by a Chinese state company, Bright Food. Tnuva is the largest food manufacturer in Israel; its sales account for 70% of the country's dairy market as well as sales of meat, eggs and packaged food.

== History ==
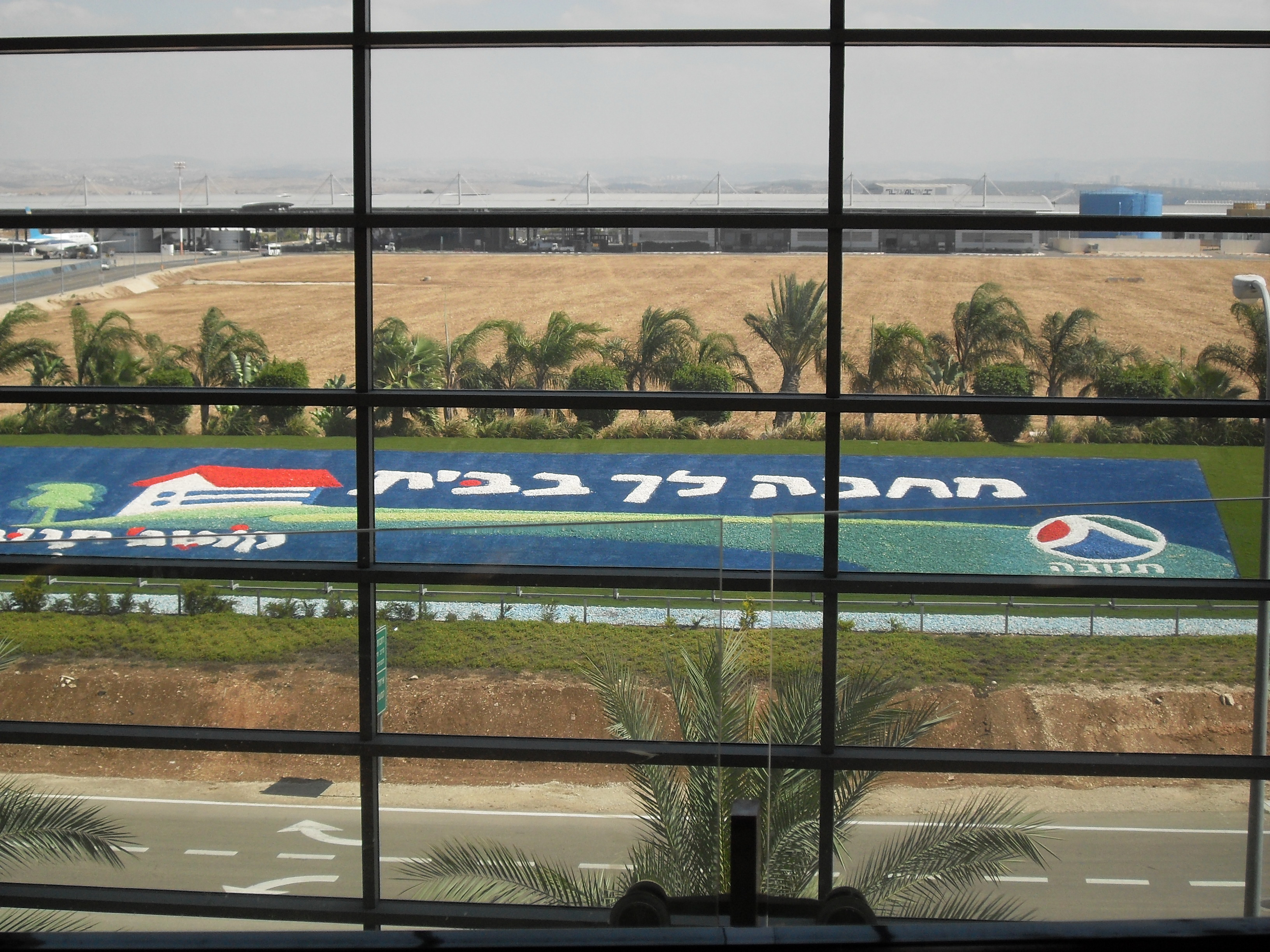
Tnuva advertising at Ben Gurion International Airport

Tnuva Central Cooperative for the Marketing of Agricultural Produce in Israel Ltd. was created in 1926, following a decision by kibbutz movement leaders to make cooperatives to distribute and export several types of food products. Tnuva was created as a result, but at first only delivered regular milk for drinking. It expanded to cover other dairy products in the 1930s.

Tnuva used the complex that would later become the Dan Center Tower as a vegetable warehouse in the nineties.

Tnuva was labelled by the Israel Antitrust Authority as a monopoly, a status that essentially places the company under government regulation, limiting the way it can change the price of its products in order to protect the consumer and smaller competitors.

An advertising campaign for Tnuva milk, showing cosmonaut Vasily Tsibliyev (Russia) drinking milk aboard the Mir space station, was broadcast on 22 August 1997. This occasion also marked the first time that milk in liquid form had been sent into space.

In 2006, it was reported that the Markstone Capital Partners Fund was interested in purchasing Tnuva and its assets for about $750 million. The general manager, Arik Reichman, valued the company at between $800 million to $1 billion. Another obstacle to selling the company, or even a large minority share, was the need to convert the cooperative to a company, which would require the approval of a majority of the members. However the same year the Tnuva cooperative members made the decision in principle to agree to the transformation of the cooperative into a limited company and sell it to private investors.

On 20 November 2006, Apax Partners Worldwide LLP, a London-based buyout firm, together with the Israeli investor Meir Shamir (Mivtach Shamir Holdings), won a tender to buy control of Tnuva. The bid valued the privately held food and dairy group at $1.025 billion, larger than Strauss-Elite Ltd. and Osem Investments Ltd., the two largest publicly held Israeli food companies. The transaction was finally completed in January 2008, following the transformation of the former cooperative into a limited company.

In June 2011, Israeli consumer action groups called for a customer ban on Tnuva products, due to them using their monopoly on the market to raise prices.

In 2012 Tnuva's Romanian branch went into bankruptcy.

On 21 May 2014, a controlling interest in Tnuva was bought by the Chinese food conglomerate Bright Foods. The company paid $2.5 billion for a 56% holding, purchasing the shares from Apax and other investors.

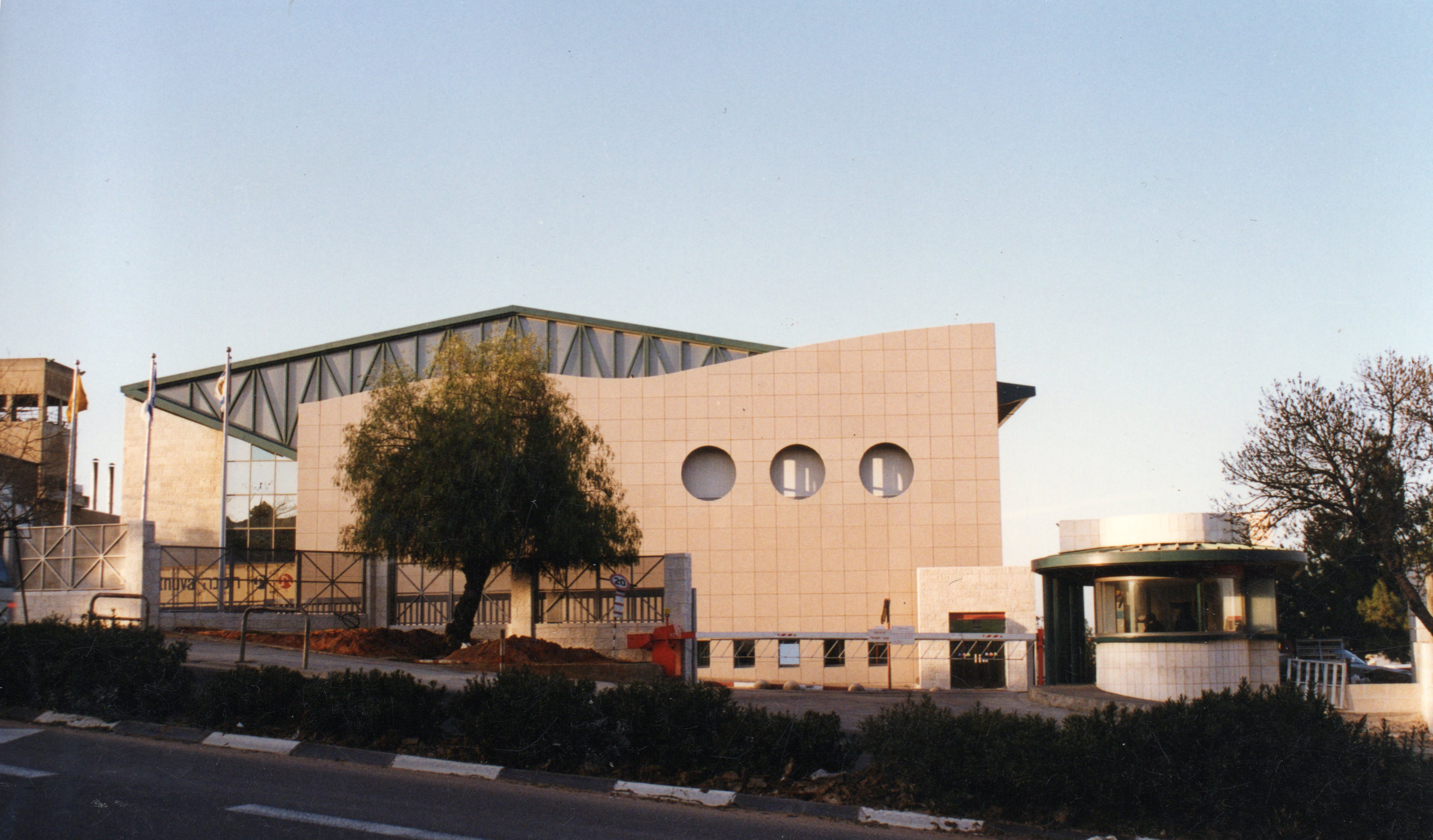
Tnuva center, Jerusalem

In August 2017, it has been reported that the kibbutzim buyers organizations have begun to consider selling their 26% stake in Tnuva Food Industries Ltd.

In June 2021, a bribery case was published, in which Tnuva received facilitation from labeling its products as part of the Ministry of Health's reform, in exchange for a donation to associations close to Moti Babchik, the personal assistant of then-Health Minister Yaakov Litzman.

=== Cottage cheese protest ===
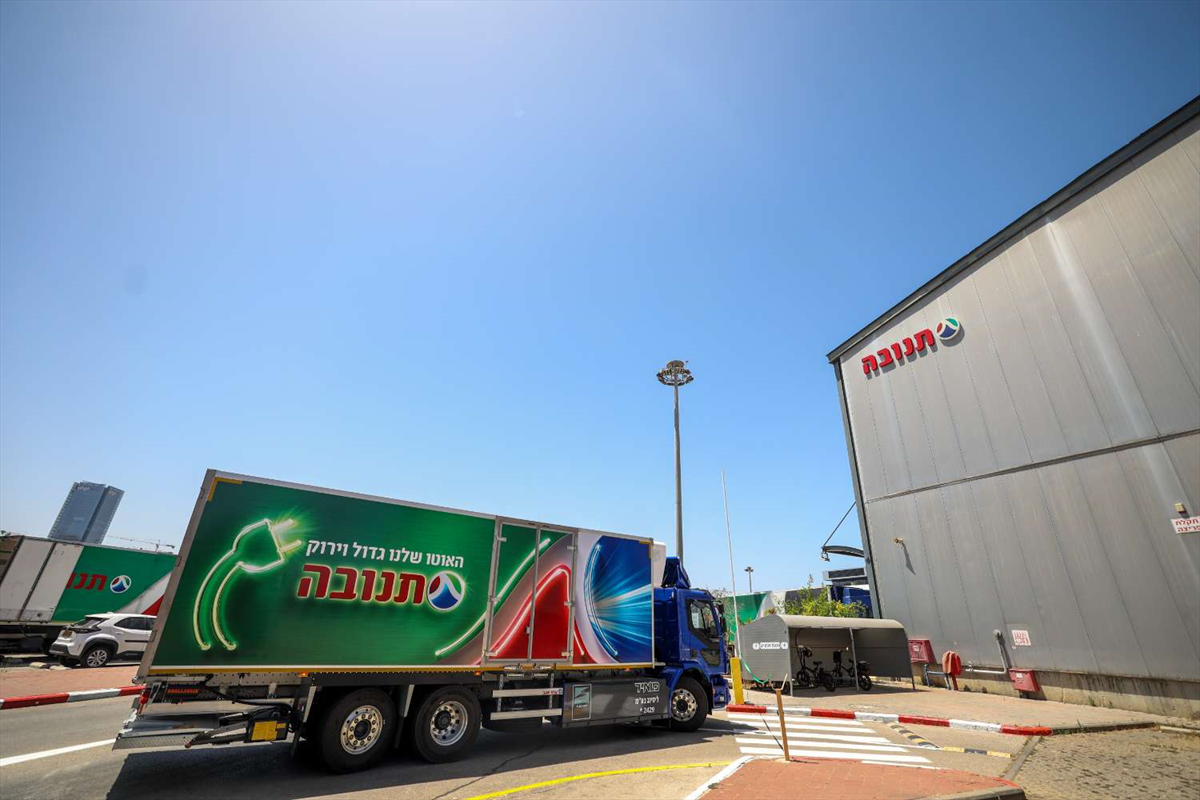
"Our Car is Big and Green" written on Tnuva's first electric truck

In September 2011, a class action was started alleging that "Tnuva abused its position to raise cottage cheese prices by more than 40% between 2006 and 2011." Prof. Avia Spivak and Dr. Meir Amir claimed that between 2009 and 2010, the price of cottage cheese increased 12% while its production cost decreased 4% leaving no doubt that Tnuva took advantage of its monopoly and repeatedly raised prices. The academics claimed this "was unreasonable, not to mention immoral, and could be carried out only by a monopoly." Witnesses for the company claimed the price changes were caused by increased retailer profit margins, an issue Spivak and Amir claimed could be resolved by publishing wholesale figures. Tnuva has been named in the 2025 report From Economy of Occupation to Economy of Genocide by the UN Special Rapporteur for the Occupied Palestinian Territories as it fuels and benefits from land dispossession.

== See also ==
- Zvi Galor
- Our Car Is Big and Green
