= David Libai =

Israeli politician (1934–2023)

- דוד ליבאי
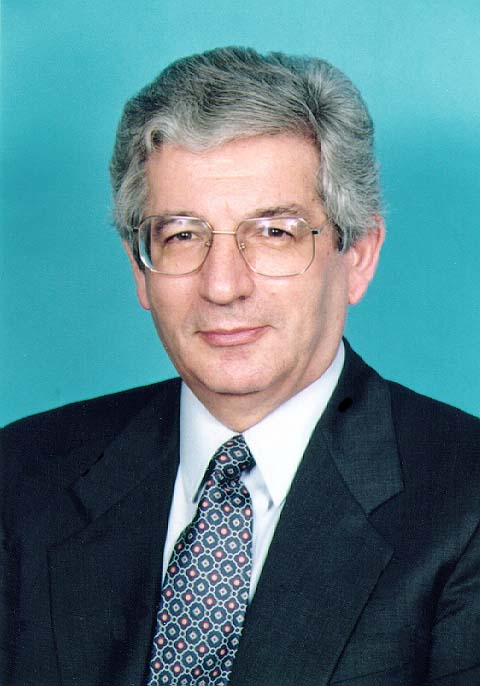
- David Libai

Ministerial roles
- 1992–1996: Minister of Justice
- 1995: Minister of the Interior

Faction represented in the Knesset
- 1984–1991: Alignment
- 1991–1996: Labor Party

Personal details
- Born: 22 October 1934 Tel Aviv, Mandatory Palestine
- Died: 23 December 2023 (aged 89)
- Party: Labor

David Libai (Hebrew: דוד ליבאי; 22 October 1934 – 23 December 2023) was an Israeli jurist and politician. He was a member of the Knesset for Labor from 1984 to 1996 and served as minister of justice from 1992 to 1996.

== Biography ==
David Libai was born on 22 October 1934 in Tel Aviv. He attended Ironi Alef High School and studied law at the Hebrew University in the academic reserve program of the Israel Defense Forces. He received his MA from the Institute of Criminology and Criminal Law in Tel Aviv University (where he served as dean of students) and his PhD from University of Chicago Law School. He served as deputy chief military prosecutor and was discharged as a major.

Libai was married and was the father of Daniel and Daphne. He died on 24 December 2023, at the age of 89.

== Political and public career ==
Libai began his professional career in the office of Minister of Justice Pinchas Rosen, in charge of the amnesty department and as spokesman for the Ministry. In 1960 he was certified as a lawyer. He was appointed chief assistant to attorney-general Colin Gillon and chief prosecutor of the state workers' disciplinary court.

In 1964, he opened a private law office. In 1977 he became chairman of the Labor Party's constitution committee. From 1983 to 1985 he was head of the Israeli Bar. He has also been a member of the National inquiry commission on prison conditions, member of the Press Council, and chairman of the Israel-Britain Parliamentary Friendship Association. He was an associate professor at Tel Aviv University and the Herzliya Interdisciplinary Center.

In 1984, he was elected to the eleventh Knesset for the Alignment. In the eleventh and twelfth Knessets he was chairman of the State Control Committee and a member of the House, Constitution and Law and Justice Committee (of which he was also a member in the fourteenth Knesset). During his tenure, the State Control Committee appointed the Bejski Commission to investigate the bank stock crisis of 1983.

After he was elected to the thirteenth Knesset for the Labor Party, he was appointed Minister of Justice by Prime Minister Yitzhak Rabin. He also held this position under Shimon Peres, following Rabin's assassination. For a brief period in 1995 he was also Interior Minister. As Minister of Justice, he initiated three national inquiry commissions: concerning the 1994 Cave of the Patriarchs massacre, the Yemenite Children Affair, and Rabin's assassination. He resigned from the Knesset in 1996.

== Private law practice ==
In 1997, he was hired to defend Samuel Sheinbein, an Israeli-American who fled the United States and sought Israeli citizenship after committing murder. He successfully convinced the Israeli Supreme Court that Sheinbein was entitled to the protections of Israeli citizenship and could thus not be extradited to the United States. After the Supreme Court's decision in February 1999, Libai stated, "Our Supreme Court once again proved that it is independent and did not yield to political pressure from the United States", before adding that Israel's extradition laws were flawed and should be amended.

In 2006, he represented former Comverse Technology CEO Kobi Alexander. He also represented former Israeli President Moshe Katsav against rape charges, but later resigned as his attorney, claiming he had taken the case only when he believed it was a blackmail attempt.

== Awards and recognition ==
Libai was the recipient of the Pinchas Rosen Award for his legal studies. In 2005, he received an ethics awards from Minister of Justice Tzipi Livni.
