= Alumim massacre =

Attack on Kibbutz Alumim

- Part of the October 7 attacks
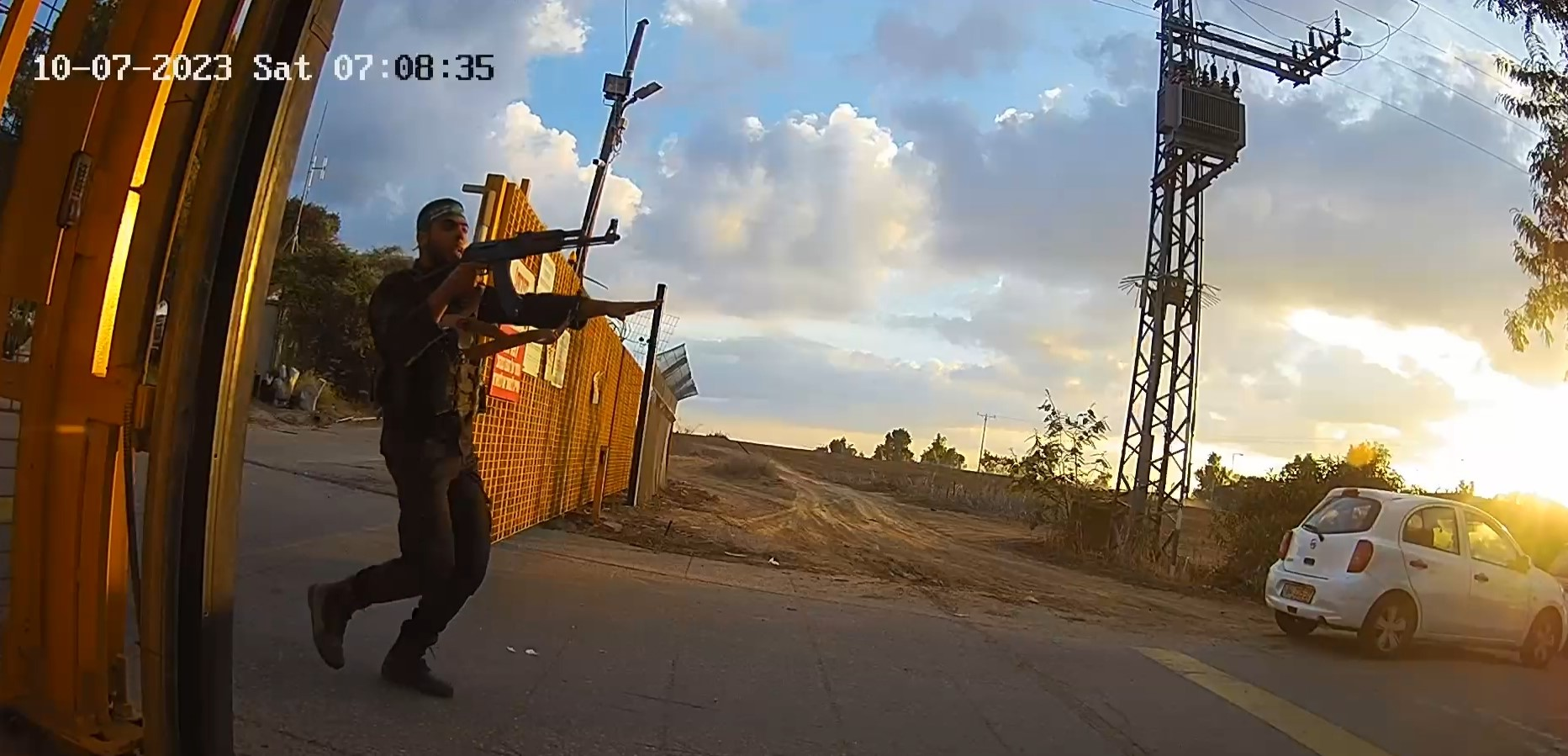
- An Izz Ad-din al-Qassam Brigades militant storming the gate of Kibbutz Alumim

- Site of the attack in Israel
- Native name: הטבח בעלומים
- Location: 31°27′6″N 34°30′49″E; Alumim, Southern District, Israel
- Date: 7 October 2023; 3 years ago
- Attack type: Mass shooting, mass murder, war crime
- Deaths: 16 or 17 Thai and Nepali workers 4 IDF soldiers and 1 police officer
- Perpetrator: Hamas

On 7 October 2023, dozens of Hamas militants attacked Alumim, a kibbutz close to the border fence with the Gaza Strip, as part of the surprise attack on Israel. There were 41 Thai and Nepalese foreigners working at the kibbutz. The militants killed between 16 and 17 of these workers and kidnapped between five and eight of them. The kibbutz's security team were too far away and unable to save the employees. The militants did severe structural damage to the Kibbutz's dairy farming operation.

After heavy fighting, the security team were able to push the militants back with the help of the Israel Defense Forces and police. No deaths among the remaining civilian population of the kibbutz were reported, although one Israeli civilian who had fled to the kibbutz after escaping the Nova music festival massacre was killed by the defenders in a case of mistaken identity. Three Israeli soldiers, two of them off-duty soldiers who had come to volunteer, and a police officer were killed in the fighting.

== Attack ==
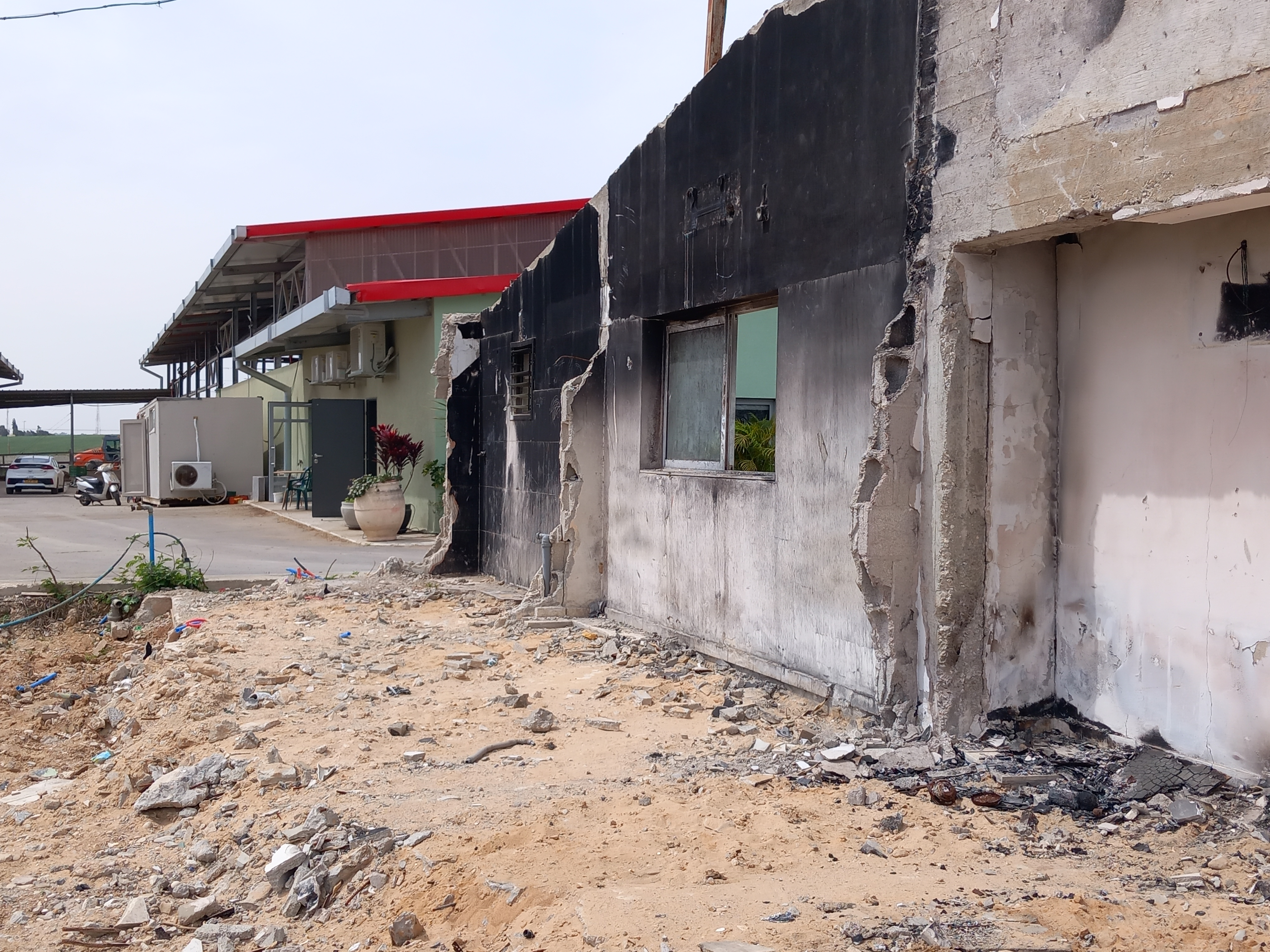
The burned residential quarters of the Thai workers, pictured in March 2024.

At around 6:30 AM, red alert sirens and the sounds of explosions from Iron Dome interceptors deployed in the area were heard. There were more explosions were heard in the area. The IDF subsequently ordered the kibbutz”s security team, consisting of 12 members with military experience, to be activated and for the roads and gates in the fields surrounding the kibbutz to be closed.

In the meantime, Eyal Rhein, the head of the security team, realized that the volume of rocket fire was out of the ordinary and went outside to investigate. He received the message from the IDF at 6:52 AM, while he was near the back gate. He then sent the other members of the security team a WhatsApp message instructing them meet at the armory, but not all saw it immediately. As he did not have the keys to two gates, he headed back to his home to get them. He then received a message from Avi Braverman, who had gone to the kibbutz "war room" to monitor the security cameras, that armed men were at the back gate breaking into the kibbutz. After returning home, Rhein grabbed his helmet, ceramic vest, rifle, and keys to the armory. At 7:06 AM, he sent another message to other members of the security team, informing them that terrorists had broken into the kibbutz. Members of the security team, as well as the son of a member who decided to join with them, gathered at the armory and equipped themselves with rifles, ammunition, helmets, and ceramic vests, and began deploying throughout the kibbutz. In addition, Ohad Braverman, a kibbutz resident who had recently been discharged from the military and Saguy Kenaan, another resident who was an army officer, began preparing to fight after hearing an explosion and bursts of gunfire. Kenaan took a rifle and gave Braverman his pistol, and they then set out towards the direction of the gunfire.

A map of Alumim subsequently found on the body of one of the militant commanders showed that the plan of attack called for the first squad to head for the nerve center of the kibbutz, consisting of the armory, the "war room", an underground complex where the kibbutz's security cameras are monitored, and the kibbutz secretariat. However, the first squad of militants instead tried to secure the front gate of the kibbutz and adjacent areas of nearby Route 232.

Between eight and ten militants on motorcycles arrived at the main gate at 7:00 AM, but were unable to open it. They then rode around the kibbutz and broke through a rear gate. This allowed them to reach and open the main gate from the inside. They began shooting at motor vehicles and their occupants who were passing on the road outside the kibbutz. More militants subsequently arrived. The militants damaged some equipment in the cowsheds and penetrated the area where foreign employees from Nepal and Thailand lived on the southern side of the kibbutz. Two Nepali workers were killed and five wounded before members of the security team reached the area. The security team members subsequently left to respond to militant infiltrations elsewhere.

Simultaneously, militants marauding near the kibbutz along Road 232 and in the surrounding fields killed civilians fleeing the Nova music festival massacre. A few civilians fleeing along the road attempted to seek shelter in the kibbutz only to be attacked by militants who had arrived from the back gate. However, the militants along the road were met with resistance. Some soldiers who had been stationed nearby fought back. An army artillery officer arrived from his home in Kiryat Gat to join the fight. Yishai and Noam Slotki, two brothers from Beersheba who were IDF reservists, also joined the battle after arriving in the area by car, and fought the militants along the road near the entrance to Alumim before being killed at approximately 9:30 AM.

Early in the battle, a militant who was one of the attacking force's commanders was wounded in the neck. At 7:19 AM he was taken to the front gate and evacuated back to Gaza along the same route he had entered the kibbutz. The loss of one of their commanders may have hampered the plan to take over the kibbutz. About 10 minutes later, two militants were killed near the front gate by security team members Eran Schlissel and Kobi Be'eri and the artillery officer.

At 7:45 AM, an elderly couple in the kibbutz reported that someone had broken into their home. The intruders were an Israeli couple, Ofek Atun and Tamar Kam, who had fled the Nova massacre and had broken into the house as they thought it had been abandoned. Atun was killed and Kam was wounded after defenders of the kibbutz responded, mistook them for militants, and shot them. Meanwhile, near the kibbutz along Route 232, the artillery officer stopped a Yasam police unit heading south, just before they ran into a large militant force, with many concentrated at the kibbutz packing house and firing at the road. A battle ensured which lasted between 20 and 30 minutes. Many militants were killed along with a Yasam officer, Ran Gvili, whose body was subsequently captured and taken to Gaza. Once the battle subsided, there was a lull in the fighting. Members of the security team continued going house to house in search of militants but at that point it was widely thought that the attack had been contained.

At about 9:20 AM, another group of militants was seen penetrating through a break in the fence and moving towards the residences of kibbutz members through a recreational area. Members of the security team as well as Ohad Braverman rushed to take positions blocking the militants' entry to the residences. In the subsequent exchange of fire, two militants were killed, one of whom was found to be a commander in possession of documents describing the attack plans, and two security team members were wounded. At this point the militants were prevented from entering the area where the remaining kibbutz civilians lived.

Intense fighting continued, with the combatants only separated by around 40–50 meters. Between 9:30 and 9:45 AM, a Wolf Armoured Vehicle carrying Israel Border Police officers arrived and briefly assisted in transporting some of the defenders from the front gate to the place of fighting near the recreational area, taking heavy fire while doing so, before it left after being dispatched to Kfar Aza. At this point, the security team members had poorer cover than the militants, who had taken positions behind concrete barriers. The kibbutz defenders rushed from place to place, shooting and taking cover. At least one more militant was killed in the fighting. The situation for the defenders became increasingly desperate, with three wounded, much of their ammunition expended, and militants seen roaming freely around the perimeter fence. However, seemingly deterred by the fierceness of the defense they encountered and the death of their commander, the militants abandoned their attack on the residences and began moving towards easier targets. They subsequently attacked the foreign workers' residences and nearby buildings and storehouses. While the defenders were successful at keeping militants from accessing the kibbutz living quarters, they failed to prevent the attack on the foreign workers' quarters, which were closer to where the fence was breached.

The security team fired at the militants but were unable to assist the workers because they were too far away. The militants entered the foreign workers' housing, killed many of them and kidnapped others to the Gaza Strip. They continued to the kibbutz dairy, where they killed additional Thai foreign workers, burned down the silo, punctured the milk tanks, and burned hay intended for the cows. Extensive damage was caused to the dairy operation. At one point, a militant was spotted by security cameras in the kibbutz's vehicle repair garage trying to break into a car, and was subsequently confronted and wounded in the leg. At another point, a member of the security team who had been wounded but continued fighting managed to shoot a militant near the perimeter fence some 200 meters away.

At 11:00 AM, the first reinforcements from the Israel Defense Forces arrived when a CH-53 helicopter carrying soldiers of the 890th Battalion of the 35th Paratroopers Brigade landed near the kibbutz. The helicopter had been hit by an RPG while descending and minutes after the troops disembarked, it was destroyed on the ground by another anti-tank missile. The paratroopers proceeded to battle militants in the area for about half an hour before regrouping. At about 11:45 AM, eight operators from the Metzada tactical unit of the Israel Prison Service arrived and joined the battle. A unit of Sayeret Matkal commandos subsequently arrived to further reinforce the defenders. At noon, 20 commandos from the elite Shaldag Unit of the Israeli Air Force arrived and for about 40 minutes engaged militants in the area between the road and the southeast corner of the kibbutz. At about 12:30 PM, the Shaldag force called in a helicopter gunship which fired on the militants who been firing at the road from inside the kibbutz. About 30 militants were killed in the fighting as was one Shaldag soldier, Warrant Officer Ido Rosenthal. A reserve officer from another unit who had joined the Shaldag troops, Major Nimrod Palmach, subsequently brought the paratroopers into the battle for the kibbutz after they regrouped. The paratroopers would later move on to Be'eri. In addition, soldiers of the Yahalom special forces unit from the IDF Combat Engineering Corps arrived at the kibbutz with an armored vehicle to join the fighting.

At about 1:00 PM, the "war room" reported that three militants were spotted penetrating the kibbutz from the avocado field through a back gate and moving towards the kibbutz residences. Yahalom soldiers rushed to the area in two groups. One group, moving to the scene in the armored vehicle and guided by Ohad Braverman, found and machine-gunned one of the attackers. The second group, guided by two members of the security team, approached from another direction. One of the militants reached the home of an elderly resident, Beni Muller, smashed the window on the back porch, and shot Muller in the stomach as he emerged from the house's safe room. Moments later the Yahalom soldiers arrived. In the subsequent exchange of fire, the militant was killed, as was the commander of the Yahalom force, Lieutenant Itai Cohen. The third militant apparently escaped. Muller was subsequently evacuated.

At about 2:00 PM, about 150 paratroopers of the 890th Battalion arrived at the kibbutz's front gate, where they were greeted by the defenders. Throughout the afternoon, the kibbutz was swept for remaining militants. More security forces subsequently arrived and secured the kibbutz. Soldiers reached and evacuated surviving Thai and Nepali workers hours after their quarters had been attacked.

On 9 October, the members of the kibbutz were evacuated to Netanya. Surviving foreign workers returned to their countries in the days after the battle.

== Casualties ==
=== Israeli ===
A few Israeli civilians who sought shelter in Alumim after fleeing the Nova music festival massacre were killed in the kibbutz. Security camera footage in the kibbutz captured footage of a young woman killed while on her knees and another being shot while trying to flee. One survivor of the festival massacre, Ofek Atun of Holon, was killed after he and his girlfriend Tamar Kam broke into the home of an elderly couple that they thought was abandoned to take shelter. The two were subsequently shot after being mistaken for militants. Atun was killed and Kam was wounded. No Israeli civilian kibbutz members are mentioned as having been killed. Non-combatant civilians mainly hid in their safe rooms for the duration of the battle.

During the fighting, brothers Yishai and Noam Slotki from Beersheba were killed. They were IDF reservists who had come to the area on their own initiative after hearing of the attack to take part in the defense of Alumim without having been called up. Noam Slotki, 31, held the rank of Master Sergeant and had most recently served as a combat medic in the Carmeli Brigade, while Yishai Slotki, 24, held the rank of Sergeant First Class and served in the Oded Brigade. Their bodies were identified five days later. The brothers were the grandsons of Rabbi Eitan Eizman, president of Tzvia educational institution network, head of the board of trustees at Orot Israel Teachers College, and former board member of Mercaz HaRav Yeshiva. They were among the seven children of Rabbi Shmuel Slotki, who was called up to help identify bodies in the aftermath of the attack and carried on this work during the five days his sons were unaccounted for. Two other IDF soldiers, Warrant Officer Ido Rosenthal of the Shaldag Unit and Lieutenant Itai Cohen of the Yahalom unit, were also killed. A police officer from the elite Yasam unit, Sergeant First Class Ran Gvili, was also killed. Several defenders and civilians were wounded and treated by the on-site kibbutz nurse before being evacuated.

==== Thai and Nepalese employees ====
Of the 41 foreigners employed as farm workers at Alumim, between 16 and 17 were killed at the start of the attack. Between five and eight others were kidnapped and taken to Gaza. Ten Nepalese nationals were killed and one kidnapped. Similar numbers for Thai nationals are less certain with one source giving the breakdown as seven killed and four kidnapped.

=== Hamas ===
Various defenders mention that “dozens” of Hamas militants attacked the kibbutz. Eight or ten militants on motorcycles were involved in the initial attack on the kibbutz's main gate. Field battle reports indicate militants initially being killed in groups of two or three by the kibbutz security team. A portion of the security team reported killing 15-20 militants. More militants were killed when IDF units joined the battle. No total number of militants killed is mentioned, but all fighting stopped by the end of 7 October. One militant was found hiding and arrested in cleanup operations on 8 October. It is not clear if this is the same person shown in a subsequent interrogation video.

== Aftermath ==
On 9 October, the members of the kibbutz were evacuated to Netanya. Surviving foreign workers returned to their countries in the days after.

A document left behind by a militant at Alumim is reported to contain orders "[to raid] the kibbutz to maximize killings, take hostages, fend off security forces, and wait for further orders”. Allegedly, a similar document was found after the Nova music festival massacre. A video, allegedly of a militant captured at Alumim, reportedly shows him pointing out further instructions to carry out beheadings, amputation of legs, and permission by his group leaders to rape the corpse of a girl, which would be war crimes. The video and the circumstances under which it was taken have not been confirmed.
