= Be'erot Yitzhak =

Kibbutz in central Israel

Be'erot Yitzhak: בְּאֵרוֹת יִצְחָק (Hebrew)
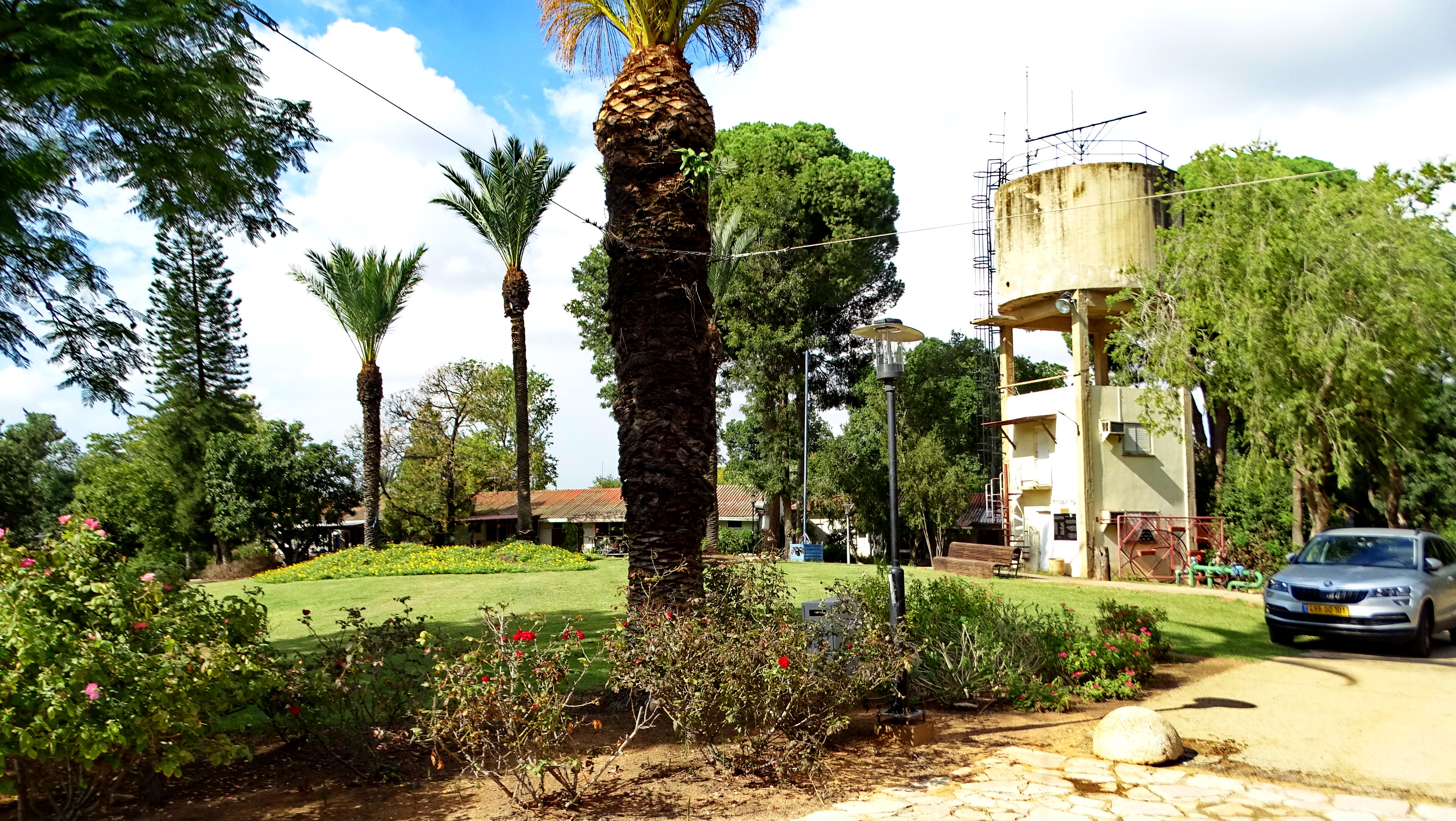
- Etymology: Isaac Wells
- Location within Central Israel Location within Israel
- Coordinates: 32°2′34″N 34°54′32″E
- Country: Israel
- District: Central
- Subdistrict: Petah Tikva
- Council: Hevel Modi'in
- Affiliation: Religious Kibbutz Movement
- Founded: 1943 (original location); 1952 (current location)
- Founder: Czechoslovak and German Jewish refugees
- Population (2024): 979
- Website: www.beerot.co.il

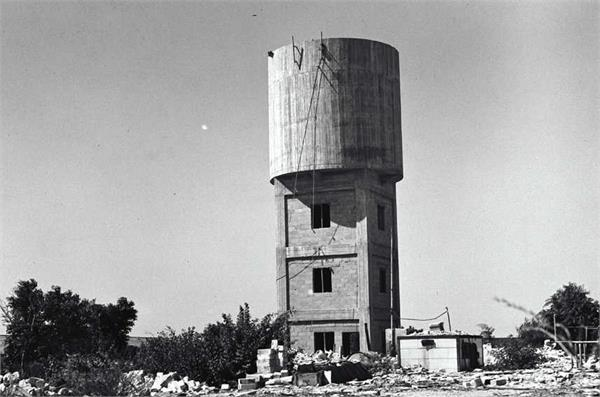
Be'erot Yitzhak in 1945

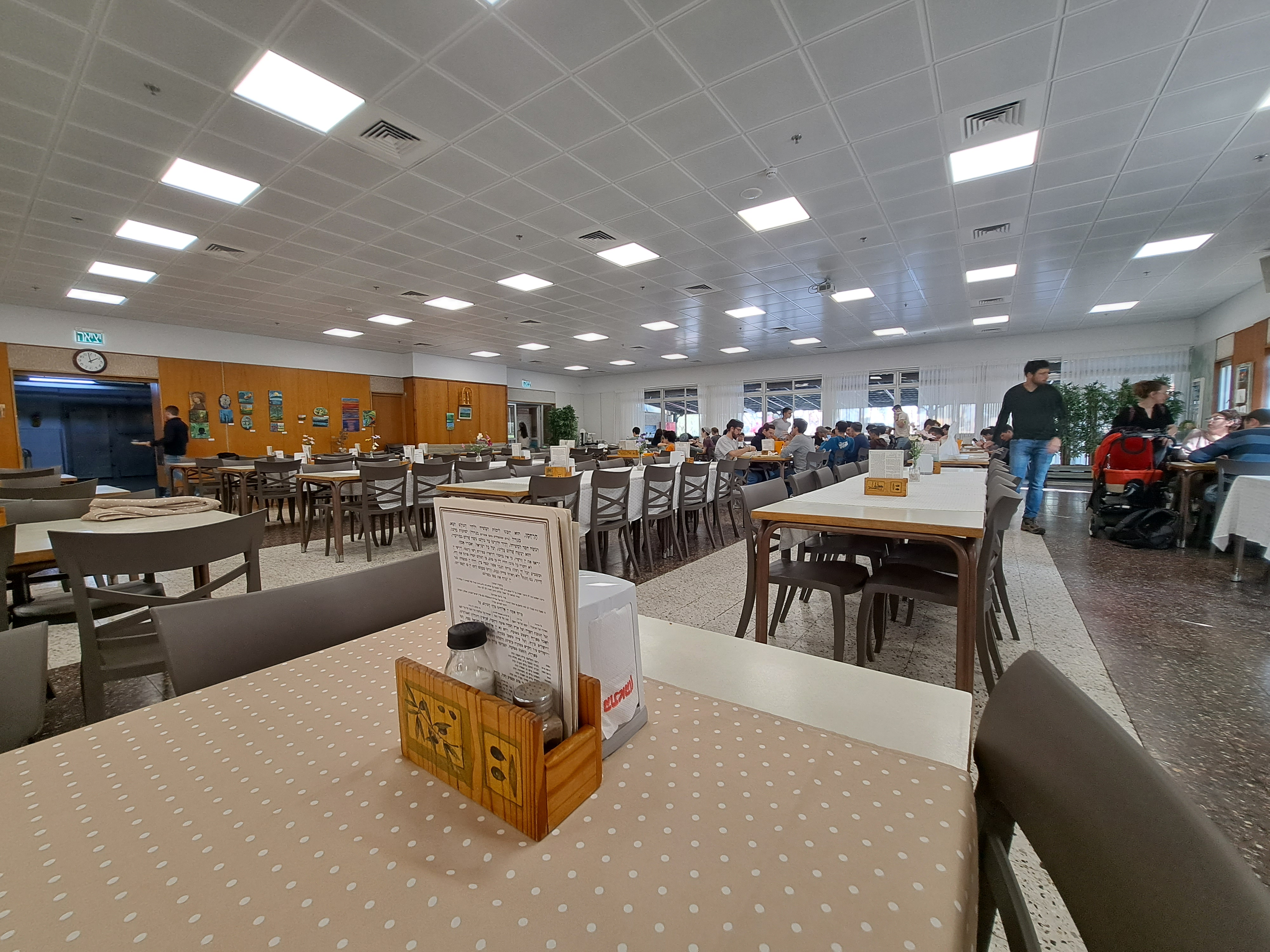
Common dining room

Be'erot Yitzhak (Hebrew: בְּאֵרוֹת יִצְחָק, lit. 'Isaac Wells') is a religious kibbutz in central Israel. Located near Yehud, it falls under the jurisdiction of Hevel Modi'in Regional Council. In 2024 it had a population of 979. Kibbutz Be'erot Yitzhak was originally located in the Negev, near Gaza. In 1952, after the kibbutz was destroyed and abandoned in the Battle of Be'erot Yitzhak, it was re-established in its current location south of Petah Tivka.

== Etymology ==
The name is a reference to the patriarch Isaac's search for water in this area. It also refers to rabbi Yitzhak Nissenbaum, one of the leaders of the Zionist Federation in Poland and a founder of the Mizrachi movement, who was murdered in the Warsaw Ghetto.

== History ==
=== Ottoman era ===
During the 18th and 19th centuries, the area was part of the Nahiyeh (sub-district) of Lod, which encompassed the area of the present-day city of Modi'in-Maccabim-Re'ut in the south to the present-day city of El'ad in the north, and from the foothills in the east, through the Lod Valley to the outskirts of Jaffa in the west. This area was home to thousands of inhabitants in about 20 villages surrounded by tens of thousands of hectares of prime agricultural land.

=== British Mandate era ===
The kibbutz was first established in 1943 near Gaza on the site of what is today Kibbutz Alumim and Kibbutz Nahal Oz. The settlers were immigrants from Czechoslovakia and Germany, members of the HaPoel HaMizrachi movement. By 1947 it had a population of 150. During the 1948 Arab–Israeli War the kibbutz took serious losses and was badly damaged by the Egyptian Army in the Battle of Be'erot Yitzhak, which included aerial bombardment. According to a report by the Jewish National Fund, the Egyptians were driven out and suffered hundreds of losses.

=== State of Israel ===
In 1949 an attempt was made to re-establish the collective on the remains of Wilhema. The kibbutz moved to its present site in central Israel in 1952.

== Notable people ==
- Judith Weinstock (born 1940), author
- Meir Shamir (born 1951), businessman
- Shaul Gutman (born 1945), academic and former politician
- Yitshak Nessenbaum (born 1868–1942) Rabbi and Zionist leader.
