= Synlait =

Milk nutrition company in New Zealand

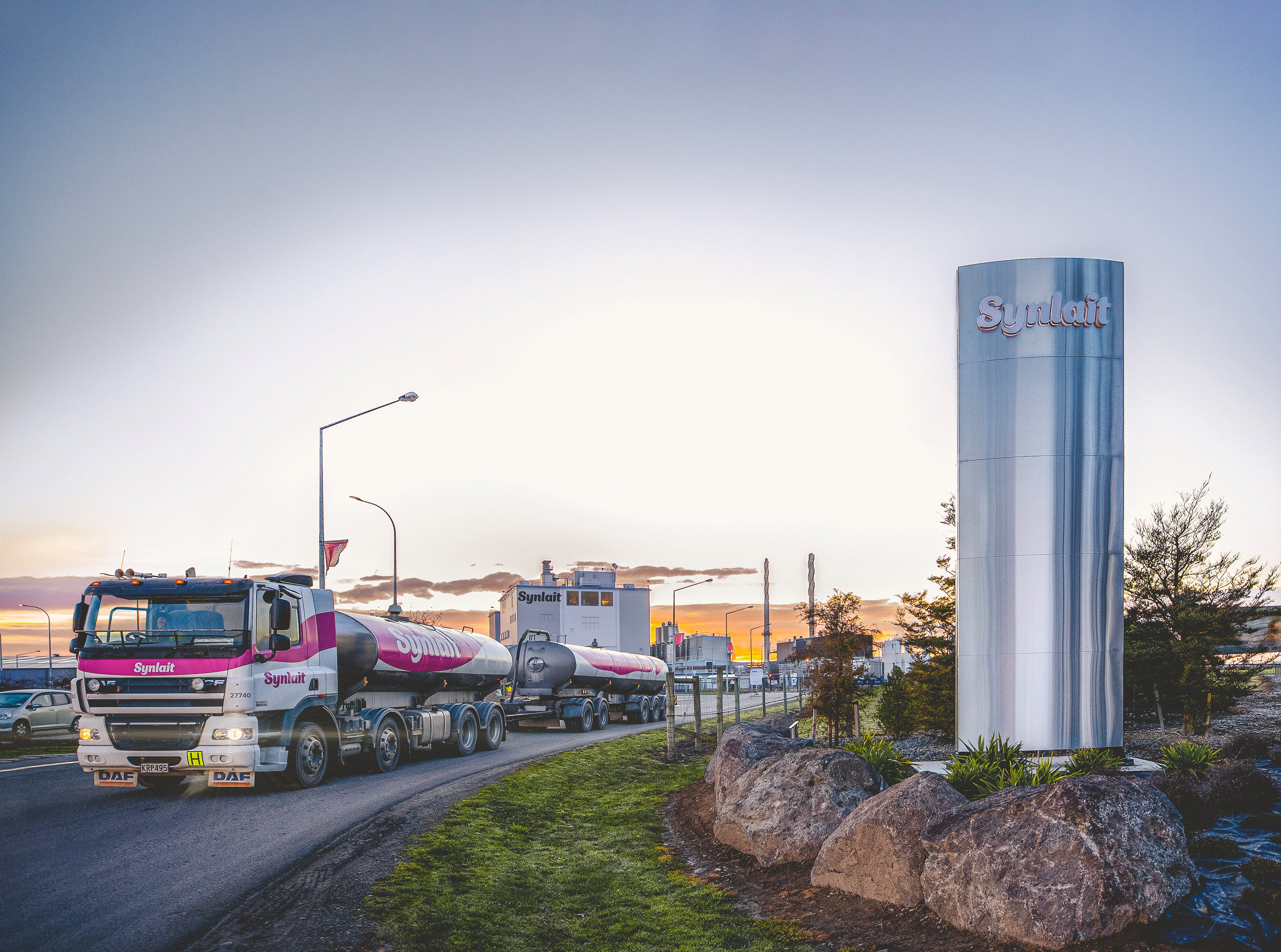
- Type: Public (NZX: SML)(ASX: SM1)
- Industry: Dairy processing and food production
- Founded: 2000
- Founder: John William Penno
- Headquarters: Dunsandel, Canterbury, New Zealand
- Area served: China, South East Asia, Middle East, Australia, New Zealand, Americas, EU.
- Key people: Grant Watson (CEO), Dr John Penno (Director, Founder)
- Products: Infant formula, advanced nutrition powders, UHT cream, whole milk powders, lactoferrin, consumer dairy
- Revenue: NZ$1.6bn (2023)
- Owner: Key shareholders: Bright Foods 39%, The a2 Milk Company 19%.
- Subsidiaries: Dairyworks Synlait Farms Talbot Forest Cheese
- Website: www.synlait.com

Synlait Milk Ltd. is a New Zealand dairy processor selling dairy and plant-based nutritional products, ingredients and powders to multinational customers worldwide. It is headquartered in Dunsandel, Canterbury, with additional manufacturing sites in Auckland and Pōkeno, a Research and Development Centre in Palmerston North and offices in Beijing and in Shanghai. The company manufactures milk powders and foodservice products such as infant formula, adult and early life nutrition products, ingredients such as lactoferrin and foodservice products such as UHT cream.

Synlait has over 280 milk suppliers across Canterbury and the Waikato, and its subsidiary Synlait Farms also supplies milk from around the Dunsandel site.

It is also the owner of consumer dairy companies Dairyworks and Talbot Forest Cheese.

== History ==
Synlait Limited was established in 2000, when dairy farmers and entrepreneurs Ben Dingle, Juliet Maclean and Dr John Penno purchased Robindale Dairy Farm in Canterbury, and by 2005 it owned eight dairy farms. Around this time, Synlait had shifted its focus from dairy farming to the manufacture of dairy products.

Synlait commissioned its first spray drier in 2007, and the Anhydrous Milk Fat facility was commissioned in September. By August 2008, Synlait began processing milk fulltime at its Dunsandel site.

Synlait was awarded Fastest Growing Manufacturer (Canterbury and Upper South Island), and 7th Fastest Growing Company in New Zealand in the Deloitte Fast 50 index.

In 2010, the Chinese firm Bright Dairy (a subsidiary of Bright Food), announced its NZ$82 million Synlait investment, and a 51% ownership stake. The invested money was used to build Dryer 2, a sophisticated processing plant that could produce high specification infant formula milk powders for multinational customers. Synlait also separated its farming business (Synlait Farms) from the milk processing business (Synlait Milk).

In March 2012, an agreement was signed with A2 Corporation Limited (later known as The a2 Milk Company) for Synlait Milk to process and supply its a2 Platinum® infant formula.

In 2013 Synlait launched its internationally accredited ISO/IEC 17065 dairy farm assurance programme, Lead With Pride, which recognises and financially rewards farmer suppliers who achieve dairy farming best practice and sustainability. Synlait spends $15 million on a special milks spray dryer upgrade to produce Lactoferrin. On 23 July Synlait Milk Limited listed on the NZX, under code SML.

Dryer 3 is commissioned at Dunsandel in 2015, a dedicated infant formula grade spray dryer.

In 2016, Synlait lists on the Australian Securities Exchange (ASX) under code SM1., and completes a $98 million capital raise.

Synlait buys The New Zealand Dairy Company Limited in May 2017, and commissions Synlait Auckland a blending and consumer packaging facility.

In 2018, Synlait purchased of 28 hectares of land in Pōkeno, North Waikato to establish its second nutritional powder manufacturing site, which would become Synlait Pokeno, capable of plant-based dairy and food production. This was followed by the official opening of the Synlait Research and Development Centre in Palmerston North, a partnership with Massey University and Food HQ. Construction of the Advanced Liquid Dairy Packaging Facility commenced at Synlait Dunsandel, which would produce high spec UHT cream and other cream based productions for the foodservice industry.

Synlait announced ambitious Science Based Targets initiative emissions reduction targets of 30% by 2030.

In 2019, Synlait commissioned New Zealand's first large-scale electrode boiler at Synlait Dunsandel, and Prime Minister Jacinda Ardern opened its Whakapuawai plant nursery, to assist Synlait farmer suppliers in reducing on-farm emissions via carbon capture, and to control nitrogen run off. Synlait also acquired Talbot Forest Cheese and Dairyworks and Synlait Pokeno began full-time production. Synlait's revenue passed NZ$1 billion for the first time in FY20.

Synlait became a Certified B Corporation in June 2020, the first NZ-headquartered dairy company to do so. Synlait also signed a new manufacturing supply agreement is signed with a large multi-national 'Customer S' (believed to be Abbott Laboratories) to manufacture, blend and package nutritional products which include plant-based products.

In 2023, Synlait announced its intention to sell its Dairyworks and Talbot Forest Cheese brands as the company refocuses its strategy toward advanced nutrition powders and foodservice products, and away from consumer dairy.

In 2024, Synlait continued to struggle in an increasing competitive environment having made questionable strategic decisions. Following poor 2023 results where all key indicators were negative, concerns about the company's ability to continue operations grew. Synlait relied on China's Dairy Bright increasing its stake from 39% to 65% bought at $0.60 a share for a $185 million issue of shares. A2 milk also retaining its 19% stake with a $32 million issue of shares at $0.43 per share.

Continuing in late 2024, Synlait ”slumped to large losses” after having unsustainable levels of debt, too much production capacity and significantly higher interest rates.

== See also ==
- Dairy farming in New Zealand
