= Simcha Shiloni =

Israeli military commander

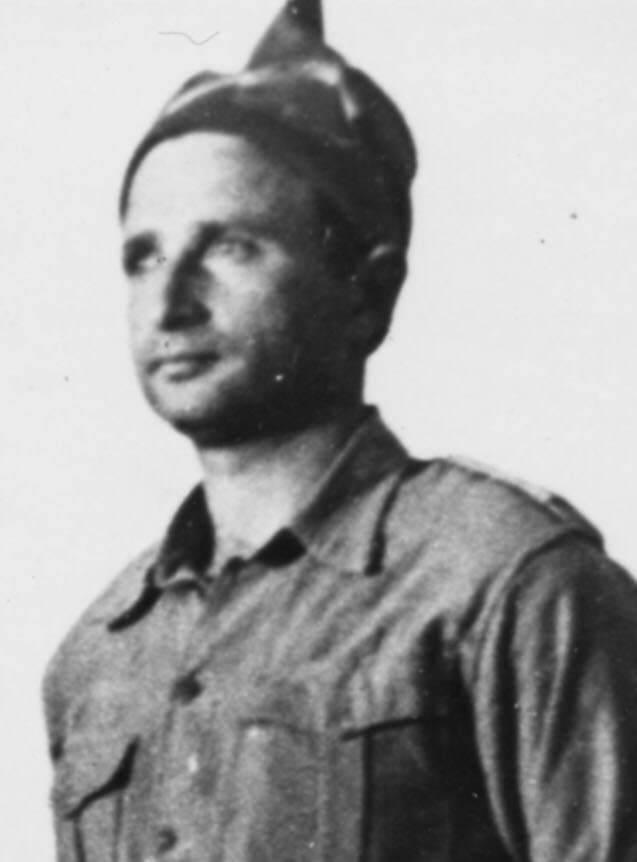
- Shiloni during Operation Horev, c. December 1948
- Native name: שמחה שילוני
- Born: 1919; Gomel
- Died: 3 December 2015 (aged 95–96) Israel
- Buried: Binyamina-Giv'at Ada, Israel

Simcha Shiloni (Hebrew: שמחה שילוני; 1919 – 3 December 2015) was a commander of the Palmach during the 1948 Palestine war.

Simcha Shiloni was born in 1919 in Gomel to Ida and Ephraim. He made aliyah with his parents in 1922 settling in Migdal.

In 1941, Shiloni was one of the first to enlist in the Palmach.

His son, Ehud Shiloni, created a scholarship fund for students from the town of Ofakim in honour of his father's unit. His daughter, Ruth Shiloni, was a torchbearer at a 1966 Independence Day ceremony commemorating fighters from the 1948 Palestine war.
