= Nyotron =

Information-security company

- Industry: Computer security
- Founded: 2009; 17 years ago
- Founder: Nir Gaist; Ofer Gaist
- Headquarters: Santa Clara, California, U.S.

Nyotron is an information-security company. It was established in 2009 by brothers Nir and Ofer Gaist. Nir Gaist is the CTO, and Sagit Manor (a former executive at Verifone) became the CEO in 2017. The company is based in Santa Clara, CA, with an R&D office in Herzliya, Israel.

== History ==
In 2006 18-year-old Nir Gaist created the original concept for the technology that became Nyotron's flagship product, Paranoid. In 2007, he and Ofer traveled to Bucharest, Romania to develop the prototype, in partnership with Matrix Rom

In 2008 he returned to Israel seeking support from investors. Major General (ret.) Amos Malka, former director of intelligence of the IDF, was among the first investors and served as Nyotron's first chairman of the board.

In 2014, the first official version of Paranoid was shipped. In 2016, Nyotron moved its headquarters to Santa Clara, CA. The company launched the Global War Room SOC console in 2017 and began offering Paranoid as a service. This Managed Detection and Response service, provided a solution for companies that require protection against advanced attackers and unknown threats but have limited security staff.

In 2018, Nyotron signed a distribution agreement with Ingram Micro. The company published an in-depth research report on the activities of the OilRig nation-state actor (a.k.a. APT34). Nyotron also joined the Anti-Malware Testing Standards Organization (AMTSO).

== Paranoid technology ==
Paranoid's anti-malware and Endpoint Detection and Response (EDR) technology are grounded on three realizations:

- There are a handful of major Operating Systems.
- Their designed (good) behavior is finite.
- Their core functionality changes infrequently.

Nyotron created a map of the known good behavior of the operating system in the areas where malicious activity would attempt access, such as file systems, process and thread management, networking and registry, and partition modification. This approach is called OS-Centric Positive Security, or automatic OS behavior whitelisting. The language used for describing these “maps” is called Behavior Patterns Mapping (BPM). This patented language does not require machine learning/artificial intelligence or any other statistical or math-based algorithm. Instead, it is deterministic. Its algorithm's complexity is O(1), which means the performance doesn't degrade with the volume of input.

As its OS-Centric Positive Security approach focuses only on the “good” behavior of the operating system, Paranoid detects and blocks both known and unknown malware (including zero-day exploits). The company calls this “threat-agnostic defense”.

In addition to protection, Paranoid provides visibility into the attack's timelines, root cause and attacker's methods (TTPs).

== Funding ==
In 2015 the company raised $10 million from Mivtach Shamir Holdings and other investors. In 2017, $21 million was raised by Douglas and Sandra Bergeron, founders of DGB Investments, with other investors. In 2018 Ingram Micro made a strategic investment of $10 million.

== Recognition ==
In September 2017, Nyotron was labeled as a “Vendor to Watch” by Enterprise Management Associates. Nyotron was also named as a Top 50 Cyber Security Leader of 2017 by Cyber Defense magazine.

In 2018, Paranoid was named “The Innovator in Endpoint Security for 2018” by Cyber Defense.

In October 2018, ICSA Labs released a report, stating Nyotron's Paranoid was ICSA Labs certified in Advanced Threat Defense. The report goes on to say that Nyotron detected 100% of the 441 malicious samples tested, and had only 1 false positive out of 721 innocuous apps in the test.

In February 2019, Nyotron won silver Cybersecurity Excellence Awards in the categories of Most Innovative Cybersecurity Company and Advanced Persistent Threat Protection.

In February 2021, the company's "Vaccine for Ransomware" spam campaign caused recipients to submit the sending emails & domains to Microsoft as spam.
