= Samuel Sheinbein =

American-Israeli murder convict (1980–2014)

Samuel Sheinbein (Hebrew: שְׁמוּאֵל שֵׁינְבַּיִן; 25 July 1980 – 23 February 2014) was an American-Israeli convicted murderer. On 16 September 1997, Sheinbein, a 17-year-old senior at John F. Kennedy High School in Montgomery County, Maryland, and Aaron Benjamin Needle, a former classmate, killed Alfredo "Freddy" Enrique Tello, Jr. They subsequently dismembered and burned the corpse in Aspen Hill, Maryland. Sheinbein fled to Israel, where his father who had Israeli citizenship was born. At the time, Israeli law prohibited extradition of Israeli citizens.

The case strained U.S.–Israeli relations and prompted an overhaul of Israeli extradition policy, which now requires a defendant seeking to avoid extradition to also demonstrate a "residential connection" to Israel. The Washington Post wrote that it became "a sensational legal tug of war involving Congress, the State and Justice departments and the upper echelons of Israel's political and judicial establishments".

Sheinbein was sentenced to 24 years in prison by an Israeli court in 1999. In 2014, he was killed in a shootout with Israeli police special forces in Rimonim Prison after he shot and wounded six officials and another prisoner with a gun that had been smuggled into the prison.

== Murder ==
=== Background ===
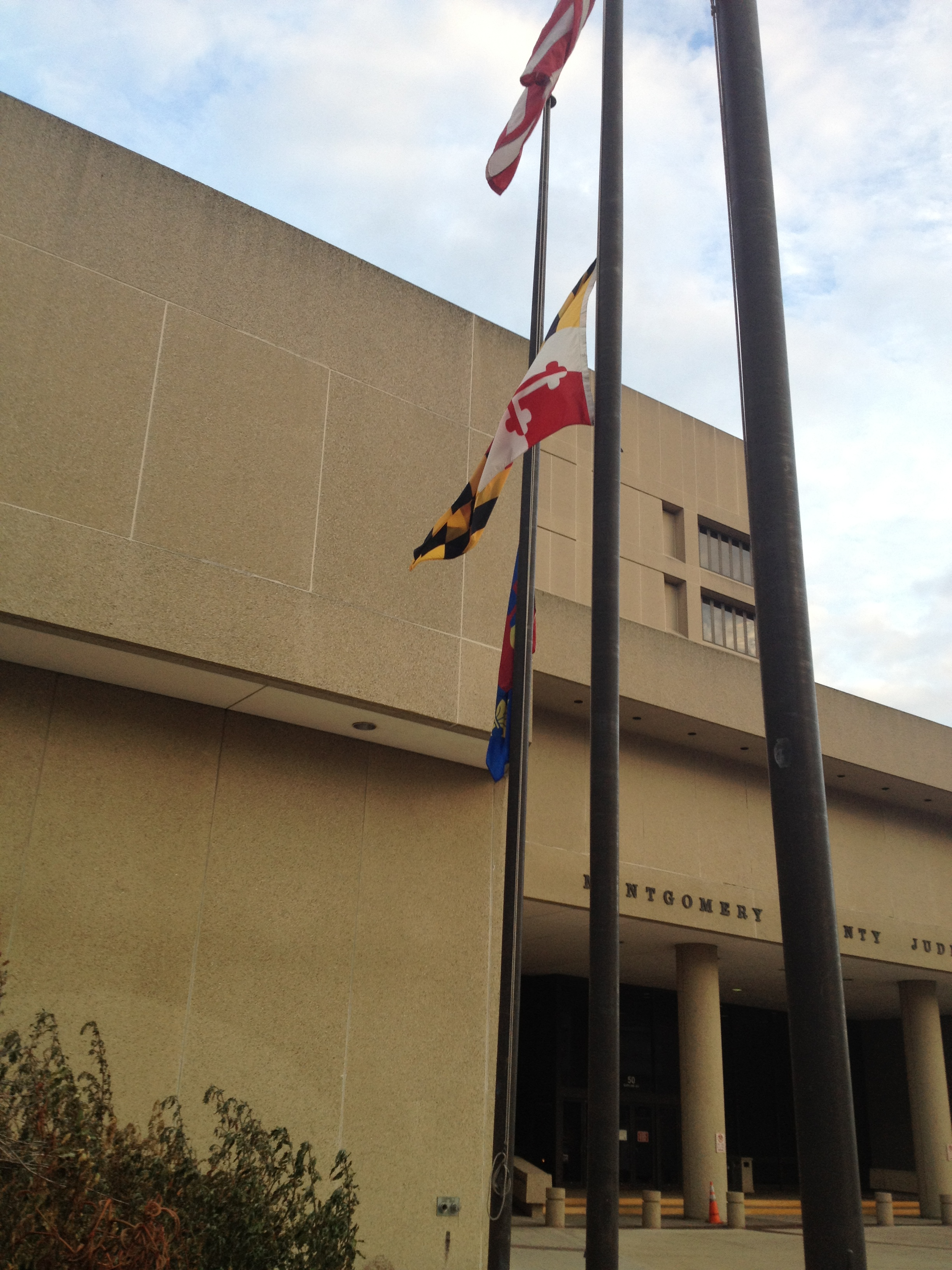
The Circuit Court in Montgomery County, Maryland, where the State's Attorney Office is located.

At age 17, Sheinbein informed a friend that he offered $5,000 for someone to kill the boyfriend of his crush and $1,000 for someone to lure his rival into a vehicle. Sheinbein sought someone to murder as practice for his intended target, according to the Montgomery County, Maryland Deputy State's Attorney, John McCarthy.

Around the same time Sheinbein was planning to murder his rival, Needle and Tello became acquainted. Needle was introduced to his fellow Montgomery County classmate, and a friend of Tello, Hannah Choi.

In September 1997, Needle had gotten into an altercation in which Tello had punched Needle in front of Choi, on whom Needle had had a crush. Choi told police that Needle appeared to be embarrassed and immediately called his friend Sam. According to McCarthy, this event led to Needle giving Sheinbein his practice victim.

=== Murder of Tello ===
Sheinbein created what prosecutors called a Recipe for Murder. On a single sheet of notebook paper, Sheinbein wrote "'Zap, pepper, metal restraints, rainsuits ... X-Acto hobby knife, plastic bags' and other items". He also "listed the Dujitsu 2000 knife and had a check mark next to 'recommended by Consumer Reports'". The piece of paper also listed size 14 shoes (according to McCarthy, both Sheinbein and Needle wore about size 10 shoes) and had written, "If they don't fit, u must acquit", a reference to Johnnie Cochran's famous line in the O. J. Simpson trial.

Authorities believe that this murder was premeditated by Sheinbein and Needle. Sheinbein and Needle allegedly incapacitated Tello with a stun gun, and then choked and stabbed Tello, finally beating him to death with a sawed-off shotgun. The autopsy report concluded that the cause of death of the victim was "a combination of blunt force injuries to the head, cutting wounds on the neck and chest, and ligature strangulation". The two stored the body of Tello in Sheinbein's garage, where they dismembered the victim's limbs and burned the torso so that Tello could not be identified as the victim. Sheinbein arranged to dispose of the body in a vacant home for sale previously owned by his classmate. Sheinbein told the classmate he wanted to use the vacant residence to be with a girl in private. Authorities believe Sheinbein and Needle transported the body to the neighborhood residence in a garbage bag in the back of Needle's Honda. The two then allegedly transported their tools of mutilation in a wheelbarrow to the vacant home.

On 19 September 1997, a realtor was preparing the vacant home for a showing, and detected a strong odor coming from the garage. The realtor found Tello's torso wrapped in garbage bags. The body was so charred and mutilated that it was initially believed to be a deer carcass. The realtor called the Montgomery County Police Department and officers quickly responded to the residence. Investigators determined the contents of the garbage bags were human remains and ruled it as a homicide. Police found the Makita electric circular saw used to dismember the victim at the scene.

=== Investigation ===
Montgomery County investigators were initially unable to determine the victim's identity. They began to interview neighbors who reported seeing the suspects. Using police canines, authorities discovered a trail of blood leading from the scene of the body to the garage of the Sheinbein residence.

Subsequent investigation led authorities to rule Sheinbein as a suspect, and based on physical evidence and eyewitness accounts, Needle was determined to be a second suspect. Warrants for the arrest of Sheinbein, for first-degree murder, and Needle, for first-degree murder, the conspiracy to commit murder, and being an accessory to murder after the fact, were issued shortly thereafter.

On 22 September 1997, Freddy Tello was reported missing by his mother. Police investigation of the missing-persons report revealed that Tello had told friends that he would meet them at the Plaza del Mercado shopping center in Silver Spring along with Needle and Sheinbein, but never showed up. Dental records of Tello were used by investigators to identify the victim. According to police reports, the suspects fled to New York City. Needle was arrested on 23 September 1997, but he committed suicide in April 1998 two days before jury selection for the trial by hanging himself with a bedsheet.

== Israel ==
=== Flight to Israel ===
Sheinbein evaded apprehension by Maryland police and fled to Israel with the help of his father, Sol Sheinbein, an attorney with dual U.S.-Israeli citizenship. Sol allegedly brought Samuel a passport, purchased an airline ticket to Tel Aviv, and drove him to John F. Kennedy International Airport to flee the United States.

Once Sheinbein was in Israel, his brother Robert flew to Israel and met him in his hotel room. On September 25, 1997, he survived an overdose of sleeping pills and wine in what was thought to have been a suicide attempt. Police found an apparent suicide letter to his family in his hotel room, and Sheinbein was placed in a psychiatric hospital. Sheinbein was arrested, and U.S. authorities were notified of his presence in Israel. In an attempt to avoid extradition, Sheinbein claimed and received Israeli citizenship as the son of an Israeli national through his father, who had been born in Mandatory Palestine and emigrated from Israel at age six.

=== Extradition fight ===
The U.S. Justice Department submitted an extradition request to Israel, and U.S. Secretary of State Madeleine Albright pressed for "maximum cooperation". Israeli Attorney General Elyakim Rubinstein opened extradition proceedings against Sheinbein. A protracted legal battle in the Israeli courts ensued as Sheinbein fought extradition. Sheinbein's family hired former Israeli Justice Minister David Libai to serve on his defense team. This resulted in a severe strain in U.S.–Israeli relations and outrage from the Latino-American community. Congress threatened to withhold aid to Israel. Extradition hearings began in the Jerusalem District Court, presided over by Judge Moshe Ravid. In February 1998, Ravid offered a compromise where Sheinbein would return voluntarily to the United States to stand trial, and if convicted, could return to Israel to serve his prison sentence. Sheinbein accepted the idea, but Maryland prosecutors rejected it. In September 1998, Ravid ruled that Sheinbein could be extradited because he had no meaningful connections to the State of Israel, used a U.S. passport, and had never lived in Israel, thus was insufficiently a citizen deserving protection under Israeli law.

The district court's decision was appealed to the Israeli Supreme Court. In February 1999, a five-judge panel of the Supreme Court blocked Sheinbein's extradition in a 3–2 ruling. It cited a 1978 law that banned the extradition of Israeli citizens. While acknowledging that Israel had signed a treaty with the United States allowing the extradition of citizens in 1963, it ruled that the 1978 law took precedence, and Sheinbein's lack of ties to Israel did not negate his claim to citizenship. Concern was expressed over the possibility that this ruling could turn Israel into a sanctuary for criminals. In writing his dissenting opinion, Justice Aharon Barak, the President of the Israeli Supreme Court, wrote of this possibility. The court's majority opinion, authored by Justice Theodor Or, expressed the position that the law prohibited Sheinbein's extradition, and the district court's ruling implied different levels of Israeli citizenship. In spite of this, Or wrote that it would have been ideal had Sheinbein been tried in the United States: "One can wonder if there is any justification for protecting someone from extradition when that person is not a resident and has no connection to Israel. It is hard to see any injustice when citizens have to stand trial for crimes they committed in a country which is the very center of their lives." In a last-ditch effort to have him extradited, Attorney General Elyakim Rubinstein submitted a request that a larger panel of Supreme Court justices reexamine the case. Deputy Supreme Court President Shlomo Levin rejected the request.

=== Conviction and imprisonment ===
Following the decision, Israeli prosecutors began preparing to try him for murder in the Israeli judicial system, and a Tel Aviv state prosecutor had already been assigned by the time the Supreme Court rejected Rubinstein's request to reconsider its decision. On March 22, 1999, State Prosecutor Hadassah Naor indicted Sheinbein for murder with intent to kill in the Tel Aviv District Court. The charge was equivalent to a charge of first-degree murder in the United States.

In August 1999, Sheinbein accepted a plea bargain with prosecutors, and in September he confessed to murdering Tello. In October, a three-judge panel at Tel Aviv District Court sentenced him to 24 years in prison, with eligibility for prison furloughs after 4 years and parole after 16 years. It was reportedly the harshest sentence that had ever been imposed in Israel for a crime committed by a minor; previously, no minor had been given a sentence longer than 20 years. This claim has been disputed. There was outrage in both Israel and the United States over the case. According to The New York Times, throughout the court proceedings of Sheinbein's plea bargain, the prosecutor, judges, and even the defense attorney showed "seemingly visceral distaste" for Sheinbein, the case, and the extradition law, which by that time had been amended. Judge Uri Goren, president of the panel, stated that "we are dealing with a defendant who forced himself upon the Israeli judicial system," noting that Sheinbein had clearly manipulated a law that had been designed to prevent Jews from being handed over to antisemitic regimes. Montgomery County State Attorney Doug Gansler expressed his opinion that the sentence was too lenient, stating "viewed through the lenses of the Israeli court, we agree that this 24-year sentence is a severe sentence … However, this is an American crime demanding American justice." Even after Sheinbein's conviction, the state of Maryland maintained a warrant for his arrest, and the United States issued an Interpol warrant, meaning that Sheinbein faced prosecution in the United States if he had ever returned, and faced extradition to the United States if he had traveled to any Interpol member country, regardless of whether he served time in Israel.

Sheinbein was imprisoned in a juvenile detention center until he turned 18, after which he was moved to Ayalon Prison, a maximum-security prison in Ramla. Later, he was transferred to Rimonim Prison, a maximum-security prison in Even Yehuda, near Netanya. He eventually became eligible for weekend furloughs, and was granted 96 such furloughs during his incarceration. In prison, Sheinbein worked in the wood shop and took university courses, eventually gaining a degree in computers. He generally displayed good behavior in prison. Months before his death, the prison spokeswoman described him as a "good prisoner". However, according to his attorney Orit Hayoun, he never received psychological counseling.

On December 13, 2012, a shiv was found in Sheinbein's cell. At the time, Sheinbein lived in a section where inmates have access to each other's cells. At a hearing over the incident in March 2013, he claimed that another inmate had planted it there, and demanded that DNA samples from the weapon be tested and security camera footage of the hallway outside his cell be reviewed. Both requests were denied, but it was ruled that the incident could not be used against him in a parole hearing. However, his furloughs were temporarily suspended.

== Consequences ==
=== Israeli extradition law ===
Outrage ensued in both countries after the February 1999 Israeli Supreme Court decision. The Knesset subsequently passed two laws overhauling Israel's extradition policy in 1999 and 2001. The first bill, which had been proposed prior and was unrelated to the Sheinbein affair, stipulated that a citizen must have a "residential connection" to Israel to avoid extradition. The second allowed Israeli citizens to be extradited "upon a guarantee that, if convicted, the Israeli national would be permitted to serve the sentence in Israel". Israel and the United States also signed a protocol on July 6, 2005, providing for "reciprocal extradition of persons charged with or convicted of an offense, including an attempt or conspiracy to commit an offense, which is punishable under the laws in both Parties by deprivation of liberty for a period of one year or by more severe penalty".

Legal analysts speculate that "Had the Sheinbein affair taken place today [in 2014], not being domiciled in Israel at the time he committed the offense, he would probably have been extradited" to the United States.

=== Family ===
After Samuel fled to Israel, his parents, Sol and Victoria, moved to Israel, where Sol found work as a patent law consultant. Shortly after Samuel's arrest, Sol Sheinbein and his son Robert, who was also present in Israel, were arrested by Israeli police for hampering an investigation and had their passports seized, but were released shortly afterward. Sheinbein's siblings, Robert and Nathalie, subsequently changed their names to Shein. Robert eventually ended up settling permanently in Israel, where he married and had two children, while his sister Nathalie remained in the US.

Sol Sheinbein was charged with obstruction of justice in the United States. He is wanted on an arrest warrant for hindering or obstructing a police investigation, but because his crime was a misdemeanor, he was not extraditable. In 2002, he was disbarred as a lawyer in Maryland by the Maryland Court of Appeals, and in 2004, he was disbarred as a lawyer in Washington, D.C., by the District of Columbia Court of Appeals. In 2004, the United States Patent and Trademark Office began disciplinary proceedings against him, and the following year revoked his patent attorney license, which Sheinbein unsuccessfully appealed.

== Aftermath and death ==
=== Gun incident ===
On 6 February 2014, Sheinbein received a furlough from jail. His furloughs had previously been suspended but were restored after he challenged the denial in court. He proceeded to the city of Ramla, where he attempted to steal a gun from a man he had met online and arranged for a meeting to buy the gun. On their way to an ammunition store in a car, Sheinbein fled from the seller with the gun. The seller caught and held him until the police arrived. Sheinbein was arrested and returned to prison. He was confined to his cell over the weekend. An indictment was filed against him over the incident, and the Israel Prison Service made a decision to transfer him to another facility.

=== Standoff and death ===
On 23 February 2014, Sheinbein called his attorney, Orit Hayoun, thanking her and telling her goodbye, and that she would hear of him shortly. Fearing that he was about to commit suicide, she called prison authorities and the district attorney's office urging them to take action, but her concerns were dismissed. About half an hour later, while being transferred to a different prison cell, Sheinbein requested a bathroom stop. He pulled out a handgun, and shot three guards, seriously injuring two of them, before barricading himself in the bathroom. A standoff ensued, during which authorities attempted to negotiate with him. The Metzada Unit, Israel's commando unit for disturbances in prisons, was called in. A heavily armed Metzada team with an attack dog arrived on the scene. After an hour, Sheinbein shot at Metzada operators around the room and they returned fire, seriously wounding him. Despite attempts to resuscitate him, Sheinbein died soon afterward. Six officials and one prisoner were wounded by Sheinbein. The shooting occurred one year before Sheinbein would have been eligible to apply for parole.

The Israel Prison Service began investigating how Sheinbein had acquired the gun, which was believed to have been smuggled into the prison. Police traced the gun to a resident of central Israel whose gun had been stolen a year before. It was reportedly "the first known case in Israel of an inmate opening fire inside a secured compound". A writer for Tablet Magazine called the fact that Sheinbein was able to acquire a gun "the latest of several major IPS screw-ups".

== In popular culture ==
"Return", an episode of Law & Order from 2000, was based on the case.

The Sheinbein case was cited in the tenth episode of the 2014 first season of Serial. During the bail proceedings in the trial of Adnan Syed, the Baltimore prosecutor urged the judge to refuse bail as she didn't "want another Sheinbein" situation on their hands, alluding to concerns that Syed would flee to Pakistan.
