= Alumim =

Kibbutz in southern Israel

Alumim: עלומים (Hebrew)
- Kibbutz
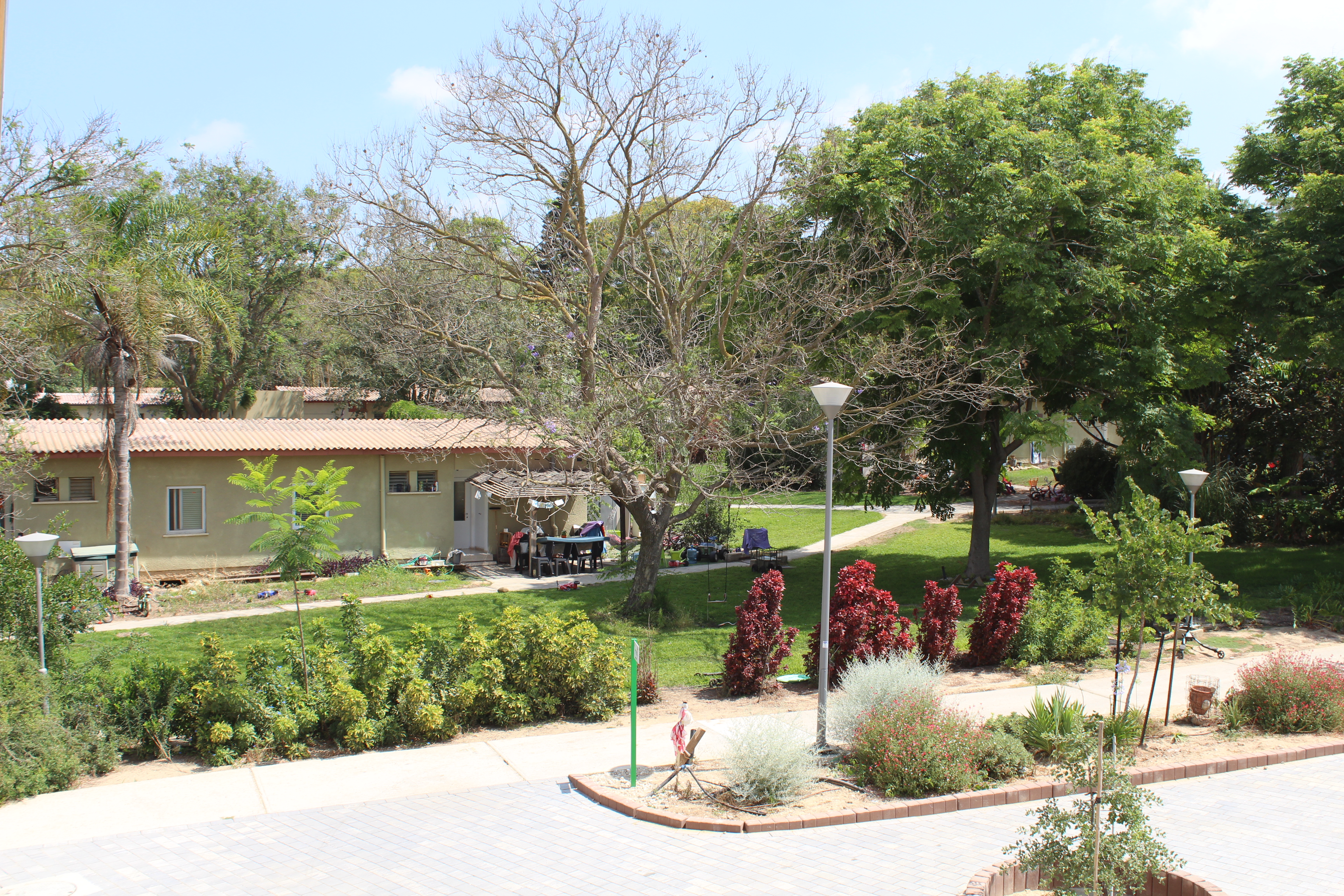
- Etymology: Youth
- Location within Northwest Negev region of Israel Location within Israel
- Coordinates: 31°27′6″N 34°30′49″E
- Country: Israel
- District: Southern
- Subdistrict: Beersheba
- Council: Sdot Negev
- Affiliation: Religious Kibbutz Movement
- Founded: 1966
- Founder: Former Bnei Akiva members
- Population (2024): 578
- Website: www.alumim.co.il

Alumim (Hebrew: עלומים, lit. 'Youth') is a religious kibbutz located in the northwestern Negev desert in southern Israel, near the Gaza Strip. The kibbutz was founded in 1966 by members of Bnei Akiva. It falls under the jurisdiction of Sdot Negev Regional Council. In 2024 it had a population of 578.

During the October 7 attacks by Hamas, which cost five volunteer defenders their lives, there was a massacre at the kibbutz, with 22 workers from Thailand and Nepal murdered and 2 kidnapped. Of the two, Bipin Joshi was confirmed deceased on 14th October 2025.

== History ==
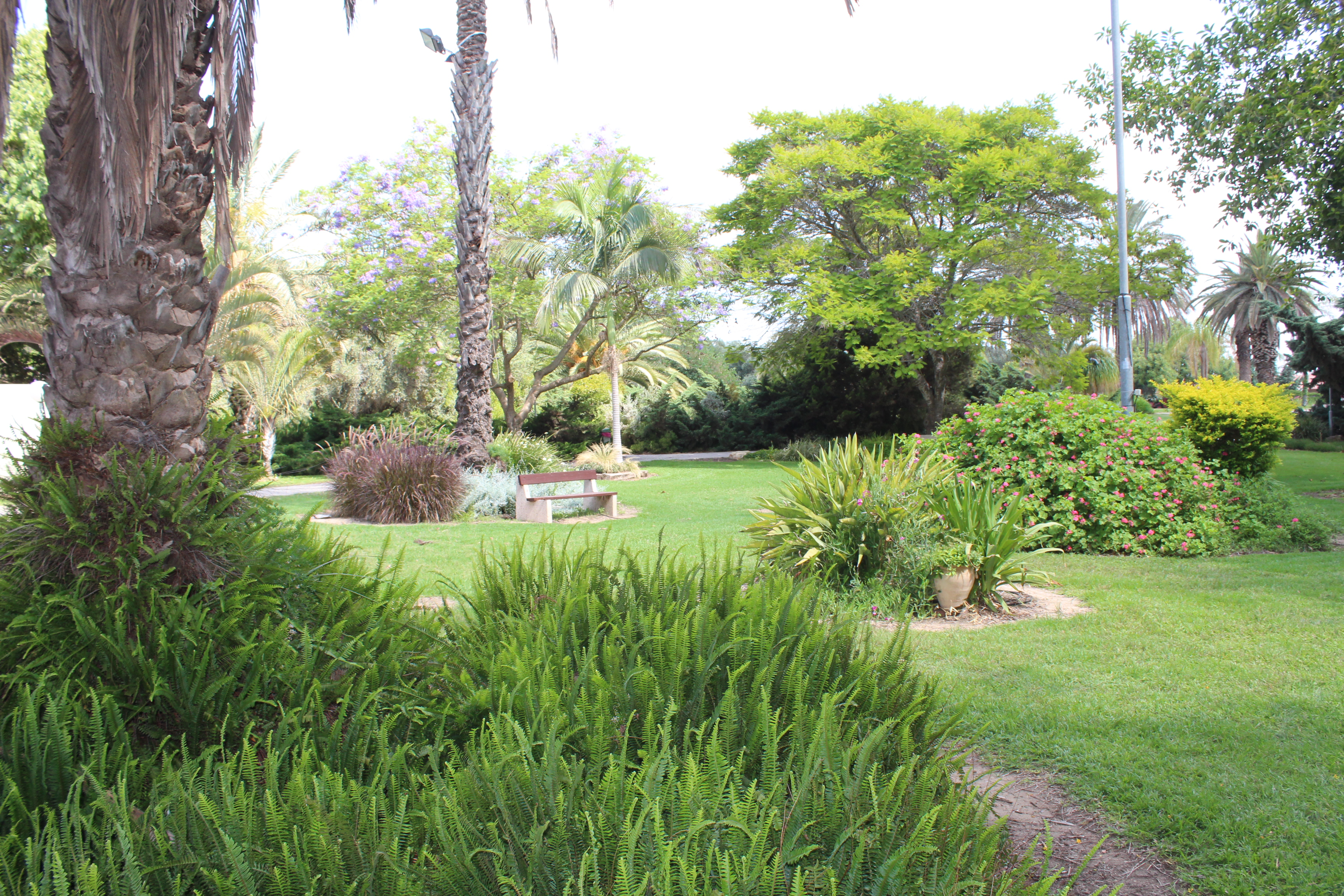
Garden in Alumim

Alumim was established in 1966 as a border settlement with Egypt by Bnei Akiva members from a Nahal gar'in. Its land had belonged to the Religious Kibbutz Movement since the 1940s and was previously farmed by kibbutz Be'erot Yitzhak, which was relocated as a result of its destruction in the 1948 Arab–Israeli War.

Over the years other Nahal groups joined the kibbutz, as well as groups of immigrants from World Bnei Akiva. The largest groups from abroad came from the United Kingdom. Today Alumim has nearly 200 members, around 110 families. About 20% of the membership are immigrants from the UK.

Through ninth grade, the children of kibbutz Alumim attend Da'at Regional school in kibbutz Sa'ad.

The Alumim massacre was an attack which took place on 7 October 2023, as part of the surprise attack on Israel by Hamas and the Palestinian Islamic Jihad. During the attack, approximately 100 Hamas militants infiltrated Alumim. The infiltrators killed 22 foreign workers from Thailand and Nepal, and kidnapped 2 people, before the kibbutz's security team and outside reinforcements managed to beat them back. Two brothers from the Israeli city Beersheba who were IDF servicemen came to participate in the kibbutz's defense during the fighting on their own initiative and were killed, as were three more troops - two soldiers and a police commando - who joined the defenders as volunteers. The fighting continued for six hours until IDF troops arrived and cleared the kibbutz of militants. 35 of the Hamas infiltrators were killed while the rest fled.

== Economy ==
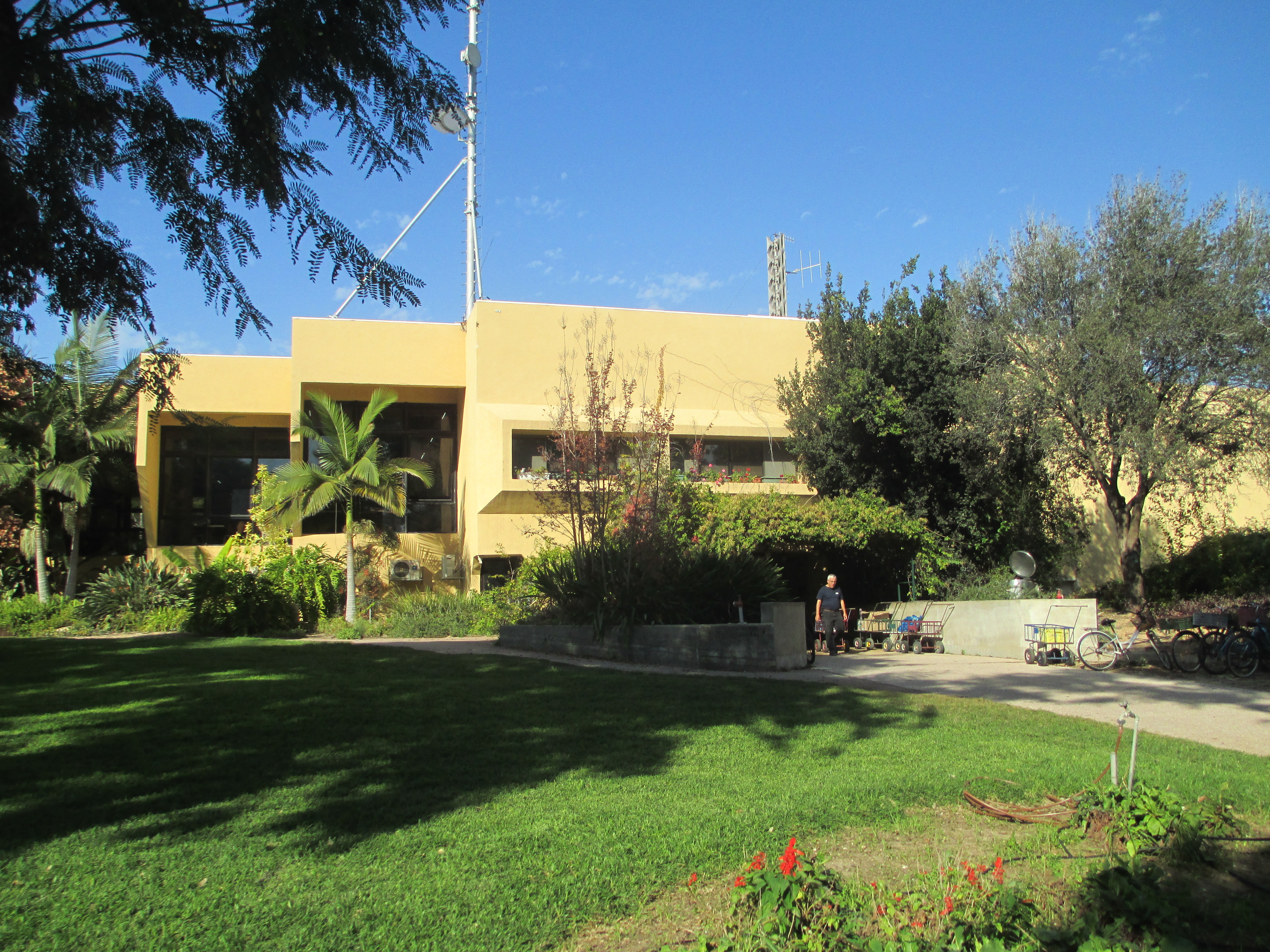
Alumim communal dining room

The economy of Alumim is based on agriculture and tourism. Alumim has maintained the classic kibbutz collective life style. Each member receives an allowance based on his or her needs (size of family, age of children etc.). The allowance is not connected to the occupation of the member. There are no monetary incentives for any form of work. Chores such as serving in the dining hall, guard duty at night, milking the cows at the weekend are done on a rota basis. They produce and sell carrots, potatoes, sweet potatoes and other organic products as well as avocado, chickens, and peppers. The kibbutz guest house has 22 self-contained apartments.
