= Bright Food =

Food and beverages manufacturing company

Bright Food (Group) Co., Ltd. (Shanghai Farm Administration)
- Type: State-owned
- Industry: Beverages; Consumer goods Food
- Founded: August 2006 (Shanghai)
- Headquarters: Shanghai, China
- Area served: Worldwide
- Key people: Qin Dong (President) Shen Wi Ping (President of Shanghai Mailing)
- Products: Foods, beverages
- Revenue: US$19 billion (2014)
- Owner: Shanghai Municipal People's Government
- Subsidiaries: Manassen Foods (75%); Bright Dairy & Food Co., Ltd. (51.62%); Shanghai First Provisions Store Co., Ltd. (100%); Shanghai Maling Aquarius Co., Ltd. (100%); Shanghai Haibo Co., Ltd. (100%); Tnuva (56%); Società per Azioni Lucchese Olii e Vini (SALOV)
- Website: www.brightfood.com

Bright Food (officially Bright Food (Group) Co., Ltd.) is a Chinese multinational food and beverage manufacturing company headquartered in Shanghai. It is the second-largest Chinese food manufacturing company measured by 2011 revenues. The company is wholly owned by the Shanghai Municipal People's Government via Shanghai Municipal Investment Group and another sister company.

Bright Food has four listed subsidiaries. Bright Dairy & Food Co., Ltd., Shanghai First Provisions Store Co., Ltd., Shanghai Maling Aquarius Co., Ltd. and Shanghai Haibo Co., Ltd.

== History ==
In 1954, Songjiang Division Office decided to build a farm on the seashore of Fengxian. In 1959, Shanghai Municipality also decided to build farms on Chongming Island. At the time of 1960, 16 farms are built on the beach in Fengxian County and on Chongming and Changxing Islands. To administrate these farms, Shanghai Agricultural Reclamation Administration (上海市农垦管理局) was set up in 1963 and was renamed to Shanghai Farm Administration (上海市农场管理局) in 1970. During this time, Huangshan Tea and Forest Farm and Lianjiang Farm was established in Anhui. In 1973, Shanghai Municipal Shanghai Farm (上海市上海农场) was officially established in Dafeng, Jiangsu as an exclave. In 1980, Shanghai Municipality decided to establish the Shanghai Agricultural Reclamation and Industrial and Commercial Joint Enterprise Corporation (上海市农垦农工商联合企业总公司), which is the other brand (一个机构、两块牌子) of the Farm Administration. In 1994, the Farm administration was officially transformed into a company, Shanghai Agricultural Industry and Commerce (Group) Corporation (上海市农工商（集团）总公司), and the brand of Farm administration was reserved for transition period proposes. In 2004, the group was renamed to Shanghai NGS (Group) Co., Ltd.(上海农工商（集团）有限公司), a state-own limited company. In 2006, With Yiming No.1 Food Factory (Group), the holder of the Bright brand, Shanghai Sugar Industry Tobacco and Alcohol Group and some subsidiaries of Jinjiang International merged, a new food group was established and NGS Group was renamed to Bright Food (Group) Co., Ltd.

== Investments and Divestments ==
In July 2010 Bright Food agreed to acquire a 51% stake in the New Zealand-based dairy producer Synlait for US$58 million. However, as of September 2015, Bright Foods hold a 39.12% stake in Synlait.

In September 2010 Bright Food entered into exclusive discussions for the acquisition of the British snack food manufacturer United Biscuits, but the talks did not result in an acquisition.

In August 2011 Bright Food agreed to acquire a 75% stake in the Australia-based food producer Manassen Foods for A$530 million.

In May 2012 Bright Food agreed to acquire a 60% stake in the British breakfast cereals manufacturer Weetabix Limited in a £1.2 billion deal. This majority stake is set to be sold to US company Post Holdings for US$1.8 billion as of 18 April 2017.

In 2012, Bright Food also acquired a 70% stake in Bordeaux wine trading company DIVA Bordeaux through its subsidiary, Shanghai Sugar Cigarette and Wine (SSCW).

In January 2014, the company acquired the Western Australian dairy company Mundella Foods.

In May 2014, Bright Food agreed to acquire a 56% stake in the Israeli dairy producer Tnuva for a sum of US$2.5 billion.

In October 2014 Bright Food agreed to acquire a majority stake in Italian olive oil producer Salov, which includes the Filippo Berio and Sagra Brands.

In September 2015, Bright Foods expressed interest in New Zealand dairy and meat company Silver Fern Farms by initiating a $100 million buyout of 50% of SFF. On 15 September, it was reported by The New Zealand Herald that Bright Foods subsidiary Shanghai Maling Aquarius Co., Ltd, had reached a $NZ261 Million deal to acquire 50% of Silver Fern Farms.

In February 2025, Bright Food sold The Margaret River Company (acquired via Manassen Foods in 2011) and Mundella Foods to Western Australian dairy firm The Cheeky Cow.

== Products ==
Bright Food's products include:

- Guangming (Bright) dairy products,
- Guansheyuan foodstuffs,
- Da Bai Tu (Big White Rabbit) candy,
- Maling canned foods,
- Bright ice cream products,
- Aquarius water,
- Shikumen rice wine,
- Yutang sugar,
- Tip Top pickled foods,
- Haifeng rice,
- Aiseng pork,
- Daying duck meat products, and
- Shengfeng chocolate.

== Market share ==
In 2010 Bright Food had a 5.7% share of China's dairy products market, ranking fourth. In the same year it had a 1.4% market share in the Chinese packaged foods market and a 1.6% share of the Chinese ice cream market.

Bright Food have a controlling stake in Israeli dairy company "tnuva", which have an 11% market share in Israel's food industry.

== Food safety incidents ==
The company's Bright Dairy subsidiary has been involved in a number of contaminated dairy products incidents over the years.

=== September 2008 milk contaminated with melanine ===
Liquid and powder milk that was distributed by Bright Dairy and other companies were found to contain melamine, a harmful chemical that was used to cheat nutrition test. The company blamed subcontractors for the cause of the problem.

=== June 2012 milk contaminated with lye ===
Bright Dairy was force to recall around 300 950ml cartons of Ubest-brand milk products that were contaminated with lye that was used to clean pipes in the packaging equipment.

=== September 2012 sour milk ===
In September 2012, Bright Dairy delivered sour milk to nearly 1,000 households in Shanghai. The company claimed that the milk was mistakenly transported at the wrong temperature.

== See also ==
- Hangzhou Wahaha Group
