= Middle Eastern crisis order of battle =

This is the order of battle of the Middle Eastern Crisis. It covers the major spillovers of the Gaza war, such as the Hezbollah–Israel conflict, Red Sea crisis, attacks on US bases during the Gaza war, 2024 Iran–Israel conflict, Israeli invasion of Lebanon, Israeli invasion of Syria, and the 2025 Iran–Israel war.

== Israel and allies ==
=== Israeli forces ===
- Israel
  - Israel Defense Forces
    - Israeli Ground Forces
      - Northern Command
        - 36th Division "Ga'ash"
          - 1st Infantry Brigade "Golani"
            - 12th Infantry Battalion "Barak"
            - 13th Infantry Battalion "Gideon"
            - 51st Infantry Battalion "HaBok'im HaRishon"
          - 6th Infantry Brigade "Etzioni"
          - 7th Armored Brigade "Saar me-Golan"
            - 77th Armored Battalion "Oz"
            - 82nd Armored Battalion "Ga'ash"
          - 188th Armored Brigade "Barak"
            - 53rd Armored Battalion "Sufa"
        - 146th Division "Ha-Mapatz"
          - 2nd Infantry Brigade "Carmeli" (reserve)
          - 4th Armored Brigade "Kiryati" (reserve)
            - 222nd Infantry Battalion
          - 9th Infantry Brigade "Oded"
          - 205th Armored Brigade "Egrof HaBarzel" (reserve)
          - 226th Paratroopers Brigade "Nesher" (reserve)
          - 228th Infantry Brigade "Alon" (reserve)
            - 5030th Infantry Battalion
        - 91st Division "Galilee"
          - 3rd Infantry Brigade "Alexandroni" (reserve)
          - 300th Territorial Brigade "Bar'am"
          - 769th Territorial Brigade "Hiram"
            - Sahel Battalion
        - 210th Division "Bashan"
          - 474th Brigade "Golan"
          - 679th Armored Brigade "Yiftach" (reserve)
          - 810th Mountain Brigade "HeHarim"
      - Southern Command
        - 143rd Division "Fire Fox"
          - 6643rd Territorial Brigade "Katif"
          - 7643rd Territorial Brigade "Gefen"
            - 585th Desert Reconnaissance Battalion
        - 162nd Armored Division "Ha-Plada"
          - 84th Infantry Brigade "Givati"
            - 424th Infantry Battalion "Shaked"
            - 432nd Infantry Battalion "Tzabar"
            - 435th Infantry Battalion "Rotem"
          - 401st Armored Brigade "I'kvot haBarzel"
            - 9th Armored Battalion "Eshet"
            - 46th Armored Battalion "Shelah"
            - 52nd Armored Battalion "Ha Bok'im"
          - 933rd Infantry Brigade "Nahal"
            - 931st Infantry Battalion "Shaham"
            - 932nd Infantry Battalion "Granite"
          - Division Signal Battalion "Afik"
        - 80th Division "Edom"
          - 460th Armored Brigade "Bnei Or"
          - 512th Territorial Brigade "Paran"
            - 33rd Border Infantry Battalion "Caracal"
            - 277th Border Infantry Battalion "Cheetah"
        - 252nd Division "Sinai" (reserve)
          - 10th Armored Brigade "Harel" (reserve)
          - 12th Infantry Brigade "Negev" (reserve)
          - 16th Infantry Brigade "Jerusalem" (reserve)
            - 8119th Battalion "Halamish"
        - LOTAR Eilat
      - Central Command
        - 99th Infantry Division "Ha'Bazak" (reserve)
          - 5th Infantry Brigade "HaSharon"
            - Yehonatan Battalion
          - 11th Infantry Brigade "Yiftach" (reserve)
            - 8679th unit
          - 88th Multidimensional Unit
          - 646th Paratroopers Brigade "Shualei Marom" (reserve)
          - 900th Infantry Brigade "Kfir"
            - 97th Infantry Battalion "Netzah Yehuda"
        - 98th Paratroopers Division "Ha-Esh"
          - 35th Paratroopers Brigade
            - 101st Paratroopers Battalion "Fatan"
            - 202nd Paratroopers Battalion "Tzapa"
            - 890th Paratroopers Battalion "Ef'a"
          - 55th Paratroopers Brigade "Hod Ha-Hanit" (reserve)
          - 89th Commando Brigade "Oz"
            - Unit 212 "Maglan"
            - Unit 217 "Duvdevan"
            - Unit 621 "Egoz"
          - 551st Paratroopers Brigade "Hetzei HaEsch" (reserve)
          - Unit 5515
        - 877th Territorial Division "Judea and Samaria"
        - 431st Territorial Brigade "Menashe"
          - 636th Field Intelligence Battalion "Nitzan"
          - 421st Territorial Brigade "Ephraim"
      - Home Front Command
        - Jerusalem and Central District Division
          - Rescue & Training Brigade
            - 498th Search & Rescue Battalion "Shahar"
            - 894th Search & Rescue Battalion "Tavor"
        - Southern District Division
          - 6050th Infantry Brigade "Daniel"
      - Personnel Directorate
        - Military Police Corps
        - Adjutant Corps
      - Infantry Corps
        - 261st Infantry Brigade
        - 646th "Hamarom" Brigade
        - 828th Infantry Brigade "Bislamach"
          - 17th Infantry Battalion "Golan Lions"
      - Combat Engineering Corps
        - Special Operations Engineering Unit "Yahalom"
        - 601st Combat Engineering Battalion "Asaf"
        - 603rd Combat Engineering Battalion "Lahav"
        - 605th Combat Engineering Battalion "HaMahatz"
        - 749th Combat Engineering Battalion
        - 801st Engineering Corps Command Unit "JP Khan North"
        - 802nd Engineering Corps Command Unit "JP Khan Center"
        - 7064th Engineering Mechanical Equipment Battalion "Tsma/Al-Sahl"
        - 8170th Combat Engineering Battalion "Ghidhan"
      - Combat Intelligence Collection Corps
        - 414th Field Intelligence Battalion "Nesher"
        - 869th Field Intelligence Battalion "Shahaf"
      - Logistics Corps
      - Artillery Corps
        - 213th Artillery Brigade "HaTkuma" (reserve)
          - 7042nd Battalion
        - 215th Artillery Brigade "Amud ha-Esh"
        - 282nd Artillery Brigade "Uzbet Golan"
        - 454th Artillery Brigade "Tabor" (reserve)
          - Doher Battalion
        - Unit 5252 "Zik"
      - Armored Corps
        - 8th Armored Brigade "HaZaken" (reserve)
          - 9212th Battalion
        - 14th Armored Brigade "Machatz" (reserve)
        - 179th Armored Brigade "Re'em" (reserve)
      - Medical Corps
      - Oketz Unit
    - Israeli Air Force
      - Ramat David Air Wing
        - 101 Squadron
        - 109 Squadron
        - 193 Squadron "Defenders of West"
      - Palmachim Air Wing
        - 123 Squadron "Desert Birds"
        - 124 Squadron "Rolling Swords"
        - 147 Squadron "Goring Ram"
        - 166 Squadron "Fire Birds"
      - Ramon Air Wing
        - 119 Squadron "Bats"
        - 190 Squadron "Magic Touch"
      - Nevatim Air Wing
        - 120 Squadron "Desert Giants"
        - 122 Squadron "Naschon"
        - 131 Squadron "Yellow Birds"
      - Sdot Micha Air Wing
      - Tel Nof Air Wing
        - 118 Squadron "Night Birds"
        - 133 Squadron
        - 210 Squadron "White Eagle"
      - Hatzerim Air Wing
        - 69 Squadron "Hammers"
        - 107 Squadron
      - Equipment and Technical Wing
        - Unit 324 "Ofek"
      - Special Forces Wing
        - Special Tactics Rescue Unit 669
        - Unit 5101 "Shaldag"
        - Unit 5700 "YAHAK"
      - Air Defense Command
        - 66th David's Sling Battalion
        - 136th Arrow Battalion
        - 137th Iron Dome Battalion
        - 138th MIM-104 Patriot Battalion
        - 139th Iron Dome Battalion
        - 947th Iron Dome Battalion
    - Israeli Navy
      - Southern Arena
        - 11th Flotilla
        - 916th Patrol Squadron
          - Snapir unit
      - Altit Arena
        - 13th Flotilla
      - Northern Arena
        - 3rd Flotilla
          - INS Magen
          - INS Hanit
          - INS Oz
          - INS Atzmaut
          - INS Nitzachon
          - INS Herev
        - 7th Flotilla
          - Underwater Missions Unit
    - Red Sea Arena
    - Home Front Command
    - Military Intelligence Directorate
      - Unit 504
      - Unit 8200
      - General Staff Reconnaissance Unit
      - Unit 9900
  - Ministry of Defense
    - COGAT
  - Israel Police
    - Southern District
    - ZAKA
    - Lahav 433
      - Unit 33 "Gideon"
    - Yasam
    - Israel Prison Service
      - Metzada Unit
    - Israel Border Police
      - MGB Southern Command
      - Yamam
      - Yamas
      - Tactical Division
  - Israeli Intelligence Community
    - Mossad
    - Shin Bet
  - Israeli armed citizens
    - Kibbutz and moshav emergency standby squads
    - Settler militants
      - Lehava
      - Tsav 9
      - Hashomer Yosh

=== Non-Israeli forces ===
- United States
  - CENTCOM
  - United States Armed Forces
    - United States Navy
      - NAVCENT
        - Fifth Fleet
          - Carrier Strike Group 2
            - USS Dwight D. Eisenhower (Aircraft carrier)
            - USS Philippine Sea (Cruiser)
            - USS Carney (Destroyer)
            - USS Laboon (Destroyer)
            - USS Mason (Destroyer)
            - USS Thomas Hudner (Destroyer)
            - USS Arleigh Burke (Destroyer)
            - USS Bataan (Amphibious assault ships)
            - USS Florida (Submarine)
      - United States Pacific Fleet
        - Third Fleet
          - Carrier Strike Group 3
            - USS Abraham Lincoln (Aircraft Carrier)
            - USS Frank E. Petersen Jr. (Destroyer)
            - USS Stockdale (Destroyer)
            - USS Spruance (Destroyer)
            - USS O'Kane (Destroyer)
            - USS Michael Murphy (Destroyer)
          - Carrier Strike Group 9
            - USS Theodore Roosevelt (Aircraft Carrier)
            - USS Daniel Inouye (Destroyer)
            - USS Russell (Destroyer)
            - USS Halsey (Destroyer)
        - USFFC
          - Carrier Strike Group 8
            - USS Harry S. Truman (Aircraft Carrier)
            - USS Stout (Destroyer)
            - USS Jason Dunham (Destroyer)
            - USS Gravely (Destroyer)
            - USS Cole (Destroyer)
            - USS Gettysburg (Destroyer)
            - USS Georgia (Submarine)
      - United States Naval Air Forces
        - Carrier Air Wing One
          - Strike Fighter Squadron 11
            - F/A-18F Super Hornet
          - Strike Fighter Squadron 136
            - F/A-18E Super Hornet
          - Strike Fighter Squadron 143
            - F/A-18E Super Hornet
          - Strike Fighter Squadron 81
            - F/A-18E Super Hornet
          - Carrier Airborne Early Warning Squadron 126
            - E-2D Hawkeye
          - Electronic Attack Squadron 144
            - EA-18G Growler
          - Fleet Logistics Support Squadron 40
            - C-2A Greyhound
          - Helicopter Sea Combat Squadron 11
            - MH-60S Seahawk
          - Helicopter Maritime Strike Squadron 72
            - MH-60R Seahawk
        - Carrier Air Wing Three
          - Strike Fighter Squadron 32
            - F/A-18 Super Hornets
          - Strike Fighter Squadron 83
            - F/A-18 Super Hornets
          - Strike Fighter Squadron 105
            - F/A-18 Super Hornets
          - Strike Fighter Squadron 131
            - F/A-18 Super Hornets
          - Electronic Attack Squadron 130
            - EA-18G Growler
          - Carrier Airborne Early Warning Squadron 123
            - E-2C Hawkeye
          - Helicopter Sea Combat Squadron 7
            - MH-60S Seahawk
          - Helicopter Maritime Strike Squadron 74
          - MH-60R Seahawk
        - Carrier Air Wing Nine
          - Strike Fighter Squadron 14
            - F/A-18E Super Hornet
          - Strike Fighter Squadron 41
            - F/A-18F Super Hornet
          - Marine Fighter Attack Squadron 314
            - F-35C Lightning II
          - Strike Fighter Squadron 151
            - F/A-18E Super Hornet
          - Electronic Attack Squadron 133
            - EA-18G Growler
          - Carrier Airborne Early Warning Squadron 117
            - E-2 Hawkeye
          - Helicopter Sea Combat Squadron 14
            - MH-60S Seahawk
          - Helicopter Maritime Strike Squadron 71
            - MH-60R Seahawk
      - United States Naval Special Warfare Command
        - United States Navy SEALs
    - United States Air Force
      - Air Force Global Strike Command
        - Eighth Air Force
          - 509th Bomb Wing
          - 131st Bomb Wing
      - One KC-135 Stratotanker
      - MQ-9 Reapers
    - United States Marine Corps
      - II Marine Expeditionary Force
        - 26th Marine Expeditionary Unit
        - 2nd Marine Aircraft Wing
          - Marine Aircraft Group 14
            - McDonnell Douglas Harriers
    - United States Coast Guard
  - Central Intelligence Agency
- United Kingdom
  - Royal Navy
    - HMS Diamond (Destroyer)
    - HMS Duncan (Destroyer)
    - HMS Richmond (Frigate)
    - HMS Lancaster (Frigate)
  - Royal Air Force
    - RAF Akrotiri
      - No. 903 Expeditionary Air Wing
        - Four RAF Typhoon fighters
        - Two Voyager KC2s
- Sri Lanka
  - Sri Lanka Navy
    - SLNS Gajabahu (Armed patrol vessel)
- Greece
  - Hellenic Navy
    - Hydra (Frigate)
    - Psara (Frigate)
- Denmark
  - Royal Danish Navy
    - HDMS Iver Huitfeldt (Frigate)
- Netherlands
  - Royal Netherlands Navy
    - HNLMS Tromp (Frigate)
    - HNLMS Karel Doorman (Joint support ship)
    - Netherlands Naval Aviation Service
      - One NH90
      - One Eurocopter AS532 Cougar
- Sweden
  - Swedish Navy (personnel only)
- Finland
  - Finnish Navy (personnel only)
- France
  - French Navy
    - Languedoc (Frigate)
    - Alsace (Frigate)
    - Forbin (Frigate)
    - Chevalier Paul (Frigate)
    - French Naval Aviation
      - Eurocopter AS565 Panther helicopters
  - French Air and Space Force
    - Base aérienne 188 Djibouti "Colonel Emile Massart"
      - 311 Corsican Squadron
        - Dassault Mirage 2000
- Italy
  - Italian Navy
    - Andrea Doria (Destroyer)
    - Caio Duilio (Destroyer)
    - Virginio Fasan (Frigate)
    - Federico Martinengo (Frigate)
- Germany
  - German Navy
    - Einsatzflottille 2
      - Hessen (Frigate)
    - Marineflieger
      - One Westland Lynx
- Belgium
  - Belgian Navy
    - Louise-Marie (Frigate)
  - Belgian Air Component
    - 40th Squadron
      - One NH90
- Estonia
  - Estonian Navy (personnel only)
- Latvia
  - Latvian Naval Forces (personnel only)
- Canada
  - Royal Canadian Navy (personnel only)
- Australia
  - Royal Australian Navy (personnel only)
- New Zealand
  - Royal New Zealand Navy (personnel only)
- Singapore
  - Republic of Singapore Navy (personnel only)
- Bahrain
  - Royal Bahraini Naval Force (personnel only)
- Seychelles
  - Seychelles Coast Guard (intelligence support)
- (Palestine) Popular Forces (Note: Popular Forces have been described as a Salafi Jihadist organization with alleged ties to the Islamic State. Several senior leaders in the Popular Forces also allied with the Islamic State in the Sinai.) (Note: From May 2024)
  - Counter Terrorism Service (Gaza)
  - Popular Army – Northern Forces
  - Popular Army in Rafah (Free Homeland Forces)
  - Popular Defense Forces – Khalil al-Wazir Battalion
- Fatah-affiliated groups
  - Counter-Terrorism Strike Force
  - Shuja'iyya Popular Defense Forces
  - Al-Mujaida clan (until Oct. 2025)

=== Inside Iran ===
- Iranian opposition
  - Anti-government demonstrators
  - Student demonstrators
  - Police and military defectors
  - Armed civilians
  - Political groups:
    - Iran National Council (INC)
    - Mojahedin-e-Khalq (MEK)
    - National Council of Resistance of Iran (NCRI)
    - Solidarity for a Secular Democratic Republic in Iran
  - Separatist groups:
    - Kurdish separatists
      - Democratic Party of Iranian Kurdistan
      - Kurdistan Freedom Party
      - Kurdistan Free Life Party
      - Xebat
      - Komalah
      - Revolutionary Toilers Association
      - Kurdistan Toilers Association
      - Kurdistan National Guard
        - Zagros Tornado units
    - Baloch separatists
      - People's Fighters Front
      - Balochistan People's Party
    - Azerbaijani separatists
      - South Azerbaijan Organisations Cooperation Council
      - Coordination Council of Azerbaijani Parties in Iran
  - Labour, civil, and retiree groups:
    - Free Workers Union of Iran
    - Iranian Writers Association
    - Coordination Council of Iranian Teachers Trade Associations
    - Haft Tappeh Sugarcane Workers Syndicate
    - Coordination Committee to Help Form Independent Labour Organisations
    - Khuzestan Retired Workers
    - Union of Retirees Group
    - Kurdish Women's Organisations
    - Retirees Union
    - Kermanshah Electricity and Metal Association
    - "Stop Executions"
    - "Justice Seekers"
    - Coordination Council for Protests of Contract Oil Workers
    - Coordination Council for Protests of Non-Formal Oil Workers
    - Coordination Council of Nurses Protests
    - "Neday-e Zanan-e Iran"
    - World Iranian Christian Alliance

=== Inside Syria ===
- Supreme Legal Committee in Suwayda (until 2026)
- Administrative Council of Jabal Bashan (from 2026)
  - Internal security forces
  - National Guard
    - Suwayda Military Council
      - Border Guard Brigade
    - Men of Dignity
    - Al-Jabal Brigade
    - Sheikh al-Karama Forces
- Non-SLCS Druze groups
  - Jaramana Shield Brigade
  - National Guard Forces

== Axis of Resistance and allies ==
=== Non-Palestinian forces ===
- Iran
  - Iranian Armed Forces
    - Khatam al-Anbiya Central Headquarters
    - Iranian General Staff
      - Iranian Army
        - Iranian Ground Forces
          - 92nd Armored Division
        - Iranian Air Force
          - Iranian Air Force 1st Tactical Airbase
          - Iranian Air Force 2nd Tactical Airbase
          - Iranian Air Force 8th Tactical Airbase
          - Iranian Air Force 14th Tactical Airbase
          - Hamadan Airbase
            - 31st Tactical Fighter Squadron
          - Kermanshah Airport
            - 1st Combat Assault Group
        - Iranian Navy
          - IRIS Albortz
        - Air Defense Force
          - Hazrat-e-Masoumah Air Defense Group
          - Khondab Air Defense Group
      - Islamic Revolutionary Guard Corps
        - Ground Forces
          - 3rd Hamzah Seyyed-ul-Shohada Special Forces Division
          - 8th Najaf-e-Ashraf Armored Division
          - 29th Nabi Akram Division
          - 31st Ashoura Mechanized Division
          - 216th Armored Brigade
          - Hazrat-e-Ruhollah Unit
          - Seyyed-ul-Shahada Provincial Unit
          - Mohammadur Rasool-Allah Provincial Unit
        - Aerospace Force
          - IRGC Air Defense Force
        - Navy
          - MV Behshad
        - Quds Force
          - Palestine Corps
          - Unit 190
        - Basij
        - Intelligence Organization
        - Ansar al-Mahdi Corps
      - Iranian Police
        - Iranian Cyber Police
  - Ministry of Defence and Armed Forces Logistics
    - Organization of Defensive Innovation and Research
  - Ministry of Intelligence
  - Ministry of Foreign Affairs
  - Ministry of Justice
- Hezbollah
  - Hezbollah military wing
    - Lebanese Resistance Brigades
    - Radwan Force
    - Hezbollah Rocket Unit
    - Imam Hussein Brigades
    - Aziz Brigades
    - Nasr Brigades
    - 4400 Brigade
    - Air Defence Brigades
    - Engineering Brigades
    - Syrian Hezbollah
- Islamic Azz Brigades
- Islamic Group
  - Fajr Forces
    - Khaled Ali unit
- SSNP-L
  - Eagles of the Whirlwind
- Amal Movement
  - Al-Abbas Force
- Islamic Resistance in Iraq
  - Asa'ib Ahl al-Haq
  - Badr Organization
  - True Promise Corps
  - Kata'ib Hezbollah
  - Kata'ib Sayyid al-Shuhada
  - Harakat Hezbollah al-Nujaba
  - Ashab al-Kahf
  - Harakat Ansar Allah al-Awfiya
  - Al Thawriyyun group
  - Lions of Okaidat
  - Popular Mobilization Forces
- Islamic Resistance in Bahrain
  - Al-Ashtar Brigades
- Islamic Resistance in Jordan
- Yemen (SPC)
  - Yemeni Armed Forces (SPC)
    - Yemen Army (SPC)
    - Yemeni Air Force (SPC)
    - Yemeni Navy (SPC)
    - Houthi militia
    - Strategic Reserve Forces
      - Missile Brigades Group
- (Ba'athist Syria) Syria (until 2024)
  - Syrian Armed Forces
    - Syrian Army
    - Syrian Air Defence Force
  - National Defence Forces
  - (Ba'athist Syria) Front for the Liberation of the Golan
- (Ba'athist Syria) Assad loyalists (from 2024)
  - (Ba'athist Syria) Coastal Shield Brigade
  - (Ba'athist Syria) Military Council for the Liberation of Syria
  - (Ba'athist Syria) Saraya al-Jawad
  - (Ba'athist Syria) Fawj Azra’il al-Jabal
  - Syrian Social Nationalist Party
    - Eagles of the Whirlwind
  - (Ba'athist Syria) Haymed's Group
  - (Ba'athist Syria) Ahmad al-Labbad's group
  - NDF remnants
    - (Ba'athist Syria) Shabiha remnants
  - (Ba'athist Syria) Suhayl al-Hasan loyalists
  - (Ba'athist Syria) Mohammad Kanjo Hassan loyalists
  - Islamic Resistance Front in Syria
    - Syrian Popular Resistance
    - (Ba'athist Syria) Coastal Shield Brigade defectors
    - Popular Resistance of the Eastern Region
    - Popular Resistance in Daraa
    - Popular Resistance in Quneitra
    - Saraya al-Areen
    - Baqiyat Allah Brigades
    - Syrian Resistance
- Abbas Shield Martyrdom Forces
- Muslim Brotherhood (in Jordan)

=== Palestinian forces ===
- Joint Operations Room
  - Hamas
    - Al-Qassam Brigades
      - Al-Nukhba Commando Force
      - Qassam Naval Commandos
      - Aerial Brigade
      - North Brigade
        - Beit Lahia Battalion
        - Beit Hanoun Battalion
        - Al Khalifa al Rashidun Battalion
        - Martyr Suhail Ziadeh Battalion
        - Jabalia al Balad Battalion
        - Imad Aql Battalion
        - Elite battalion
      - Gaza Brigade
        - Sabra-Tal al Islam Battalion
        - Daraj wal Tuffah Battalion
        - Radwan Battalion
        - Shujaiya Battalion
        - Zaytoun Battalion
        - Shati Battalion
        - Possible elite battalion
      - Central Brigade
        - Deir al Balah Battalion
        - Al Bureij Battalion
        - Al Maghazi Battalion
        - Nusairat Battalion
        - Possible elite battalion
      - Khan Younis Brigade
        - Camp Battalion
        - North Khan Younis Battalion
        - South Khan Younis Battalion
        - Eastern Khan Younis Battalion
        - Qarara Battalion
        - Elite battalion
      - Rafah Brigade
        - Eastern Battalion
        - Khalid bin al Walid Battalion
        - Shaboura Battalion
        - Unknown fourth battalion
        - Elite Battalion
      - West Bank Brigade
        - Qabatiya Battalion
        - Jenin Battalion
        - Tulkarm Battalion
        - Nur Shams Battalion
        - Nablus Battalion
        - Tubas Battalion
      - Hamas-Lebanon
        - Al-Aqsa Flood Vanguards
      - General Security Services
  - Palestinian Islamic Jihad
    - (Palestinian Islamic Jihad) Al-Quds Brigades
      - Gaza Brigade
        - Turukman Battalion
        - Shuja'iyya Battalion
      - Central Camps Brigade
      - Naval forces
      - Tulkarm Brigade
      - Nur Shams Brigade
      - Jenin Brigade
      - Nablus Brigade
      - Tubas Brigade
      - Qabatiya Brigade
      - Ramallah Brigade
  - Popular Front for the Liberation of Palestine
    - (Popular Front for the Liberation of Palestine) Abu Ali Mustafa Brigades
      - Dheisheh camp guards
  - Democratic Front for the Liberation of Palestine
    - National Resistance Brigades
  - Ex-Fatah groups
    - Al-Aqsa Martyrs' Brigades
      - Youth of Revenge and Liberation
        - Hornets' Nest
        - Jenin Battalion
        - Qalqilya Battalion
        - Rapid Response Group (Tulkarm)
        - Nur Shams Battalion
        - Nablus Battalion
        - Khalil al-Rahman Battalion
    - Ayman Jawda Squads
    - Martyr Abdul Qader al Husseini Brigades
  - Popular Resistance Committees
    - Al-Nasser Salah al-Deen Brigades
  - Palestinian Mujahideen Movement
    - Mujahideen Brigades
      - Gaza Brigade
  - Palestinian Freedom Movement
    - Al-Ansar Brigades
  - Popular Front for the Liberation of Palestine – General Command
    - Jihad Jibril Brigades
  - Lions' Den
  - Biddya Brigades
  - Jerusalem Brigades
  - Al-Ayyash Battalion
- Ministry of Interior of the Gaza Strip
  - Gaza Police
    - Arrow Unit
  - General Security Services
    - Rad'a Force
- Fatah al-Intifada
- Martyr Muhammad al-Deif Brigades
- (Palestine) Gazan civilian mobs

== Non-aligned ==
- Jihadist Groups
  - Saraya Ansar al-Sunnah
  - Hayat Ansar al-Tawhid al-Islamiyah
  - Firqat al-Ghuraba
  - Al-Qaeda
    - Ajnad Bayt al-Maqdis
  - Jaysh al-Ummah
  - Islamic State
    - (Islamic State) Palestine District (alleged by Israel) (denied by Egypt)
    - Lone wolf insurgents
    - Islamic State – Khorasan Province (Note: 2024 Kerman bombings)
    - Military of the Islamic State (Note: During the Fall of the Assad regime)
- Barbakh clan
- (Palestine) Palestinian Authority
  - Palestinian Security Services
    - Palestinian Civil Police Force
    - Palestinian National Security Forces
- Lebanon (Note: The Lebanese government stated they will stay out of the conflict between Hezbollah and Israel, but would respond to Israeli attacks on their positions.)
  - Lebanese Armed Forces
- Syria (Note: Syrian conflict (2024–present) and Israeli invasion of Syria (2024–present))
  - Southern Operations Room
  - Syrian Armed Forces
    - Syrian Army
      - 40th Division
      - 56th Division
      - 12th Brigade
      - 107th Brigade
      - 80th Division
      - 62nd Division
      - 76th Division
      - 118th Division
      - 84th Division
      - 66th Division
      - 80th Division
      - 86th Division
      - 72nd Division
    - Syrian Air Force
    - Syrian Navy
  - Ministry of Interior
    - General Security Service
    - General Intelligence Service
    - Criminal Investigations Department
    - Syrian Special Missions Directorate
    - Desert Security Forces
  - (Syria) Syrian National Army (until 2025)
    - Hamza Division (until 2025)
    - Sultan Suleiman Shah Division (until 2025)
    - Syrian Turkmen Brigades (until 2025)
      - Sultan Mehmed the Conqueror Brigade (until 2025)
      - Sultan Murad Division (until 2025)
    - (Syria) Burkan al-Furat
    - (Syria) Ahrar al-Sharqiya remnants
  - (Syria) Free Hasakah Forces
  - (Syria) Ahrar al-Jazeera
  - Ahrar Jabal al-Arab
  - Guest House of Dignity
  - Pro-government Deir ez-Zor Military Council defectors
  - Tribal militias (partially aligned with government)
    - Arab Tribal and Clan Forces
    - Lions of the Ougaidat Brigade
    - Syrian Council of Tribes and Clans
    - Southern Tribes Gathering
    - Anizah
    - Bani Khalid
    - Al-Uqaydat
      - Al-Shaitat
      - Al-Busraya
    - Mawali
    - Al-Bu Nasir
    - Nu'aym
    - Tribes of Lajat
    - Al-Baggara
    - Bani Sakher
    - Tayy
    - Shammar
      - Al-Sanadid Forces
    - Jubur
    - al-Buhamad clan
Syrian opposition (before 2024)
  - Syrian Salvation Government
    - Hay'at Tahrir al-Sham
  - (Syrian opposition) Syrian Interim Government
  - Jaysh al-Izza
  - (Syrian opposition) Suqour al-Sham Brigades
  - Ansar al-Tawhid
  - Turkistan Islamic Party in Syria
  - Imam Bukhari Jamaat
  - Ajnad al-Kavkaz
  - Jama'at Ansar al-Islam
  - (Syrian opposition) Southern Operations Room
  - (Syria) Decisive Battle Operations Room
  - (Syria) Burkan al-Furat
  - (Syria) Al-Busraya Revolutionaries
  - (Syrian opposition) Syrian Free Army
- Qatar
  - Qatar Armed Forces
    - Qatar Emiri Air Force
  - Qatar State Security
- India
  - Indian Navy
    - INS Kolkata (Destroyer)
    - INS Kochi (Destroyer)
    - INS Chennai (Destroyer)
    - INS Visakhapatnam (Destroyer)
    - INS Mormugao (Destroyer)
    - INS Tarkash (Frigate)
    - INS Talwar (Frigate)
    - Indian Naval Air Arm
      - HAL Dhruv helicopters
- Pakistan
  - Pakistan Navy
    - PNS Tughril (Frigate)
    - PNS Taimur (Frigate)
    - PNS Shamsheer (Frigate)
    - PNS Aslat (Frigate)
    - PNS Yarmouk (Corvette)
    - PNS Moawin (Replenishment oiler)
    - PNS Madadgar (Coastal tanker)
    - Pakistan Naval Air Arm
      - WS-61 Sea King helicopters
  - Pakistan Maritime Security Agency
    - 26th Offshore Patrol Squadron
      - PMSS Zhob (Maritime Patrol Vessel)
  - Pakistan Armed Forces (Note: During 2024 Iran–Pakistan conflict)
    - Pakistan Army
      - Strategic Forces Command
      - Artillery Regiment Corps
      - Air Defence Command
    - Pakistan Air Force
    - Jaysh al-Adl
- China
  - People's Liberation Army Navy
    - Jiaozuo (Destroyer)
    - Xuchang (Frigate)
    - Honghu (Replenishment oiler)
    - (China) People's Liberation Army Naval Air Force
      - Two Harbin Z-9 helicopters
- Saudi Arabia
  - Royal Saudi Air Defense Forces
    - 290th Patriot unit
- Egypt
  - Egyptian Air Force
  - Egyptian Air Defense Forces
  - Egyptian Army
    - Egyptian Border Guard Corps (Note: A skirmish between Israeli and Egyptian soldiers occurred near the Rafah crossing, resulting in one Egyptian soldier being killed. Both countries accused each other of opening fire first. Reuters however cited Egyptian sources as stating that the Egyptian soldier shot at IDF soldiers who crossed into Egypt while pursuing and killing several Palestinians. The IDF troops fired back, resulting in his death and sparking a clash between two sides which left several IDF soldiers and one Egyptian soldier wounded. i24NEWS quoted IDF sources accusing Egyptian soldiers of firing at the Engineering Corps in Rafah first, resulting in several Egyptian soldiers being wounded while the IDF received no casualties. The New Arab meanwhile reported that seven IDF soldiers were wounded. An Egyptian soldier wounded in the clash later succumbed to his wounds, although the state-affiliated Al Qahera News cited a security source as denying it.)
- Democratic Autonomous Administration of North and East Syria
  - Syrian Democratic Forces
    - People's Protection Units
    - Women's Protection Units
      - Şehid Ayaz Battalion
    - Martyr Haroun Units
    - Asayish
    - Raqqa Internal Security Forces
    - Self-Defense Forces
    - Hêzên Komandos
    - Afrin Liberation Forces (alleged)
    - Various military councils
      - Al-Kasra Military Council
      - Manbij Military Council
      - Tabqa Military Council
      - Sireen Military Council
      - Al-Bab Military Council
- United Nations
  - United Nations Interim Force in Lebanon (Note: Although UNIFIL is a peacekeeping force and is not actively engaged in hostilities, its positions have been targeted and its peacekeepers have suffered casualties.)
    - (United Nations) (Indonesia) Garuda Contingent
    - (United Nations) (Malaysia) MALBATT
    - (United Nations) (Republic of Ireland) 121st/125th Infantry Battalion
  - United Nations Disengagement Observer Force
  - United Nations Truce Supervision Organization

== See also ==
- List of orders of battle
- Gaza war order of battle
- Iran–Israel war order of battle
