= Gaza war order of battle =

This is the order of battle of the Gaza war.

== Israel and allies ==
=== Israeli forces ===
- Israel Defense Forces
  - Israeli Ground Forces
    - Northern Command
      - 36th Division "Ga'ash"
        - 1st Infantry Brigade "Golani"
          - 12th Infantry Battalion "Barak"
          - 13th Infantry Battalion "Gideon"
          - 51st Infantry Battalion "HaBok'im HaRishon"
        - 7th Armored Brigade "Saar me-Golan"
          - 77th Armored Battalion "Oz"
          - 82nd Armored Battalion "Ga'ash"
        - 188th Armored Brigade "Barak"
          - 53rd Armored Battalion "Sufa"
      - 146th Division "Ha-Mapatz"
        - 2nd Infantry Brigade "Carmeli" (reserve)
        - 4th Armored Brigade "Kiryati" (reserve)
        - 205th Armored Brigade "Egrof HaBarzel" (reserve)
      - 91st Division "Galilee"
        - 3rd Infantry Brigade "Alexandroni" (reserve)
    - Southern Command
      - 143rd Division "Fire Fox"
        - 6643rd Territorial Brigade "Katif"
        - 7643rd Territorial Brigade "Gefen"
          - 585th Desert Reconnaissance Battalion
      - 162nd Armored Division "Ha-Plada"
        - 84th Infantry Brigade "Givati"
          - 424th Infantry Battalion "Shaked"
          - 432nd Infantry Battalion "Tzabar"
          - 435th Infantry Battalion "Rotem"
        - 401st Armored Brigade "I'kvot haBarzel"
          - 9th Armored Battalion "Eshet"
          - 46th Armored Battalion "Shelah"
          - 52nd Armored Battalion "Ha Bok'im"
        - 933rd Infantry Brigade "Nahal"
          - 931st Infantry Battalion "Shaham"
          - 932nd Infantry Battalion "Granite"
        - Division Signal Battalion "Afik"
      - 80th Division "Edom"
        - 460th Armored Brigade "Bnei Or"
        - 512th Territorial Brigade "Paran"
          - 33rd Border Infantry Battalion "Caracal"
          - 277th Border Infantry Battalion "Cheetah"
      - 252nd Division "Sinai" (reserve)
        - 10th Armored Brigade "Harel" (reserve)
        - 12th Infantry Brigade "Negev" (reserve)
        - 16th Infantry Brigade "Jerusalem" (reserve)
          - 8119th Battalion "Halamish"
      - LOTAR Eilat
    - Central Command
      - 99th Infantry Division "Ha'Bazak" (reserve)
        - 5th Infantry Brigade "HaSharon"
          - Yehonatan Battalion
        - 88th Multidimensional Unit
        - 646th Paratroopers Brigade "Shualei Marom" (reserve)
        - 900th Infantry Brigade "Kfir"
          - 97th Infantry Battalion "Netzah Yehuda"
      - 98th Paratroopers Division "Ha-Esh"
        - 35th Paratroopers Brigade
          - 101st Paratroopers Battalion "Fatan"
          - 202nd Paratroopers Battalion "Tzapa"
          - 890th Paratroopers Battalion "Ef'a"
        - 55th Paratroopers Brigade "Hod Ha-Hanit" (reserve)
        - 89th Commando Brigade "Oz"
          - Unit 212 "Maglan"
          - Unit 217 "Duvdevan"
          - Unit 621 "Egoz"
        - 551st Paratroopers Brigade "Hetzei HaEsch" (reserve)
    - Home Front Command
      - Jerusalem and Central District Division
        - Rescue & Training Brigade
          - 498th Search & Rescue Battalion "Shahar"
          - 894th Search & Rescue Battalion "Tavor"
      - Southern District Division
        - 6050th Infantry Brigade "Daniel"
    - Personnel Directorate
      - Military Police Corps
      - Adjutant Corps
    - Infantry Corps
      - 261st Infantry Brigade
      - 646th "Hamarom" Brigade
      - 828th Infantry Brigade "Bislamach"
        - 17th Infantry Battalion "Golan Lions"
    - Combat Engineering Corps
      - Special Operations Engineering Unit "Yahalom"
      - 601st Combat Engineering Battalion "Asaf"
      - 603rd Combat Engineering Battalion "Lahav"
      - 605th Combat Engineering Battalion "HaMahatz"
      - 749th Combat Engineering Battalion
      - 801st Engineering Corps Command Unit "JP Khan North"
      - 802nd Engineering Corps Command Unit "JP Khan Center"
      - 7064th Engineering Mechanical Equipment Battalion "Tsma/Al-Sahl"
      - 8170th Combat Engineering Battalion "Ghidhan"
    - Combat Intelligence Collection Corps
      - 414th Field Intelligence Battalion "Nesher"
      - 869th Field Intelligence Battalion "Shahaf"
    - Logistics Corps
    - Artillery Corps
      - 213th Artillery Brigade "HaTkuma" (reserve)
        - 7042nd Battalion
      - 215th Artillery Brigade "Amud ha-Esh"
      - 282nd Artillery Brigade "Uzbet Golan"
      - 454th Artillery Brigade "Tabor" (reserve)
        - Doher Battalion
      - Unit 5252 "Zik"
    - Armored Corps
      - 8th Armored Brigade "HaZaken" (reserve)
        - 9212th Battalion
      - 14th Armored Brigade "Machatz" (reserve)
      - 179th Armored Brigade "Re'em" (reserve)
    - Medical Corps
    - Oketz Unit
  - Israeli Air Force
    - Palmachim Air Wing
      - 123 Squadron "Desert Birds"
      - 124 Squadron "Rolling Swords"
      - 147 Squadron "Goring Ram"
    - Ramon Air Wing
      - 190 Squadron "Magic Touch"
    - Sdot Micha Air Wing
    - Tel Nof Air Wing
      - 118 Squadron "Night Birds"
      - 210 Squadron "White Eagle"
    - Special Forces Wing
      - Special Tactics Rescue Unit 669
      - Unit 5101 "Shaldag"
      - Unit 5700 "YAHAK"
    - Air Defense Command
      - 66th David's Sling Battalion
      - 137th Iron Dome Battalion
      - 139th Iron Dome Battalion
      - 947th Iron Dome Battalion
  - Israeli Navy
    - Southern Arena
      - 11th Flotilla
      - 916th Patrol Squadron
        - Snapir unit
    - Altit Arena
      - 13th Flotilla
    - Northern Arena
      - 3rd Flotilla
        - INS Hanit
        - INS Oz
        - INS Atzmaut
      - 7th Flotilla
      - Underwater Missions Unit
  - Israel Police
    - Southern District
    - ZAKA
    - Lahav 433
    - Special Patrol Unit
    - Israel Border Police
      - MGB Southern Command
      - Yamam
      - Yamas
      - Tactical Division
  - Military Intelligence Directorate
    - Unit 504
    - Unit 8200
    - General Staff Reconnaissance Unit
    - Unit 9900
  - Ministry of Defense
    - COGAT
  - Shin Bet
  - Israel Prison Service
    - Metzada Unit
  - (Israel) Israeli armed citizens
    - Kibbutz and moshav emergency standby squads

=== Non-Israeli forces ===
- (Palestine) Popular Forces (Note: Popular Forces have been described as a Salafi Jihadist organization with alleged ties to the Islamic State. Several senior leaders in the Popular Forces also allied with the Islamic State in the Sinai.) (Note: From May 2024)
  - Counter Terrorism Service
  - Popular Army – Northern Forces
  - Popular Army in Rafah (Free Homeland Forces)
- Fatah-affiliated groups
  - Counter-Terrorism Strike Force
  - Shuja'iyya Popular Defense Forces
  - Al-Mujaida clan (until Oct. 2025)
- Palestinian Authority
  - Palestinian Security Services (disputed)

== Hamas and allies ==
=== Palestinian forces ===
- (Palestine) Joint Operations Room
  - (Hamas) Al-Qassam Brigades
    - Al-Nukhba Commando Force
    - Qassam Naval Commandos
    - Aerial Brigade
    - North Brigade
      - Beit Lahia Battalion
      - Beit Hanoun Battalion
      - Al Khalifa al Rashidun Battalion
      - Martyr Suhail Ziadeh Battalion
      - Jabalia al Balad Battalion
      - Imad Aql Battalion
      - Elite battalion
    - Gaza Brigade
      - Sabra-Tal al Islam Battalion
      - Daraj wal Tuffah Battalion
      - Radwan Battalion
      - Shujaiya Battalion
      - Zaytoun Battalion
      - Shati Battalion
      - Possible elite battalion
    - Central Brigade
      - Deir al Balah Battalion
      - Al Bureij Battalion
      - Al Maghazi Battalion
      - Nusairat Battalion
      - Possible elite battalion
    - Khan Younis Brigade
      - Camp Battalion
      - North Khan Younis Battalion
      - South Khan Younis Battalion
      - Eastern Khan Younis Battalion
      - Qarara Battalion
      - Elite battalion
    - Rafah Brigade
      - Eastern Battalion
      - Khalid bin al Walid Battalion
      - Shaboura Battalion
      - Unknown fourth battalion
      - Elite Battalion
  - (Palestinian Islamic Jihad) Al-Quds Brigades
    - Gaza Brigade
      - Turukman Battalion
      - Shuja'iyya Battalion
    - Central Camps Brigade
    - Naval forces
  - (Popular Front for the Liberation of Palestine) Abu Ali Mustafa Brigades
  - National Resistance Brigades
  - Al-Nasser Salah al-Deen Brigades
  - (Fatah) Al-Aqsa Martyrs' Brigades
  - Mujahideen Brigades
    - Gaza Brigade
  - Al-Ansar Brigades
  - Jihad Jibril Brigades
  - Al-Assefa Army
  - Martyr Abdul Qader al Husseini Brigades
- Ministry of Interior of the Gaza Strip
  - General Security Services
    - Rad'a Force
  - Civil Police Force
    - Arrow Unit
- Fatah al-Intifada
- Martyr Muhammad al-Deif Brigades
- (Palestine) Gazan civilian mobs

== Non-aligned ==
- Jaysh al-Ummah
- Islamic State
  - (Islamic State) Palestine District (alleged by Israel) (denied by Egypt)
  - Lone wolf insurgents
- Barbakh clan (disputed)

== See also ==
- Middle Eastern crisis order of battle
- Iran–Israel war order of battle
- List of orders of battle
