= Twelve-Day War order of battle =

This is the Twelve-Day War order of battle.

== Israel and allies ==
- Israel
  - Israel Defense Forces
    - Israeli Air Force
      - Air Wing 1
        - 101 Squadron
        - 109 Squadron
      - Air Wing 6
        - 69 Squadron
        - 107 Squadron
      - Air Wing 8
        - 133 Squadron
      - Air Wing 28
        - 120 Squadron
      - Air Wing 30
        - 147 Squadron
      - Air Defense Command
    - Israeli Navy
      - Altit Arena
        - 13th Flotilla
      - Northern Arena
        - 3rd Flotilla
        - 7th Flotilla
    - Home Front Command
    - Military Intelligence Directorate
  - Mossad
- United States
  - United States Armed Forces
    - United States Air Force
      - Air Force Global Strike Command
        - Eighth Air Force
          - 509th Bomb Wing
          - 131st Bomb Wing
    - United States Navy
      - USS Georgia
  - Central Intelligence Agency

== Iran and allies ==
- Iran
  - Iranian Armed Forces
    - Khatam al-Anbiya Central Headquarters
    - Iranian General Staff
      - Iranian Army
        - Iranian Ground Forces
          - 92nd Armored Division
        - Iranian Air Force
          - Iranian Air Force 1st Tactical Airbase
          - Iranian Air Force 2nd Tactical Airbase
          - Iranian Air Force 8th Tactical Airbase
          - Iranian Air Force 14th Tactical Airbase
          - Hamadan Airbase
            - 31st Tactical Fighter Squadron
          - Kermanshah Airport
            - 1st Combat Assault Group
        - Iranian Navy
        - Air Defense Force
          - Hazrat-e-Masoumah Air Defense Group
          - Khondab Air Defense Group
      - Islamic Revolutionary Guard Corps
        - Ground Forces
          - 3rd Hamzah Seyyed-ul-Shohada Special Forces Division
          - 8th Najaf-e-Ashraf Armored Division
          - 29th Nabi Akram Division
          - 31st Ashoura Mechanized Division
          - 216th Armored Brigade
          - Hazrat-e-Ruhollah Unit
          - Seyyed-ul-Shahada Provincial Unit
          - Mohammadur Rasool-Allah Provincial Unit
        - Aerospace Force
          - IRGC Air Defense Force
        - Navy
        - Quds Force
          - Palestine Corps
          - Unit 190
        - Basij
        - Intelligence Organization
        - Ansar al-Mahdi Corps
      - Iranian Police
        - Iranian Cyber Police
  - Ministry of Defence and Armed Forces Logistics
    - Organization of Defensive Innovation and Research
  - Ministry of Intelligence
  - Ministry of Foreign Affairs
  - Ministry of Justice
- Yemen (SPC)
  - Yemeni Armed Forces (SPC)
    - Yemeni Air Force
    - Houthi militia
    - Strategic Reserve Forces
      - Missile Brigades Group

== See also ==
- Middle Eastern crisis order of battle
- Gaza war order of battle
- List of orders of battle
