= International Squadron =

International Squadron can refer to:

- International Squadron (Crete intervention, 1897-1898), a multinational naval formation that intervened in Crete during a revolt here from 1897 to 1898
- International Squadron (China), a fighter unit led by Claire Chennault in China
- former name of 120 Squadron (Israel), Israeli Air Force
- International Squadron (film), a 1941 film starring Ronald Reagan
