= Assassination of Ismail Haniyeh =

2024 murder of Hamas leader in Tehran, Iran

- Part of the Gaza war, the 2024 Iran–Israel conflict, and the Middle Eastern crisis (2023–present)
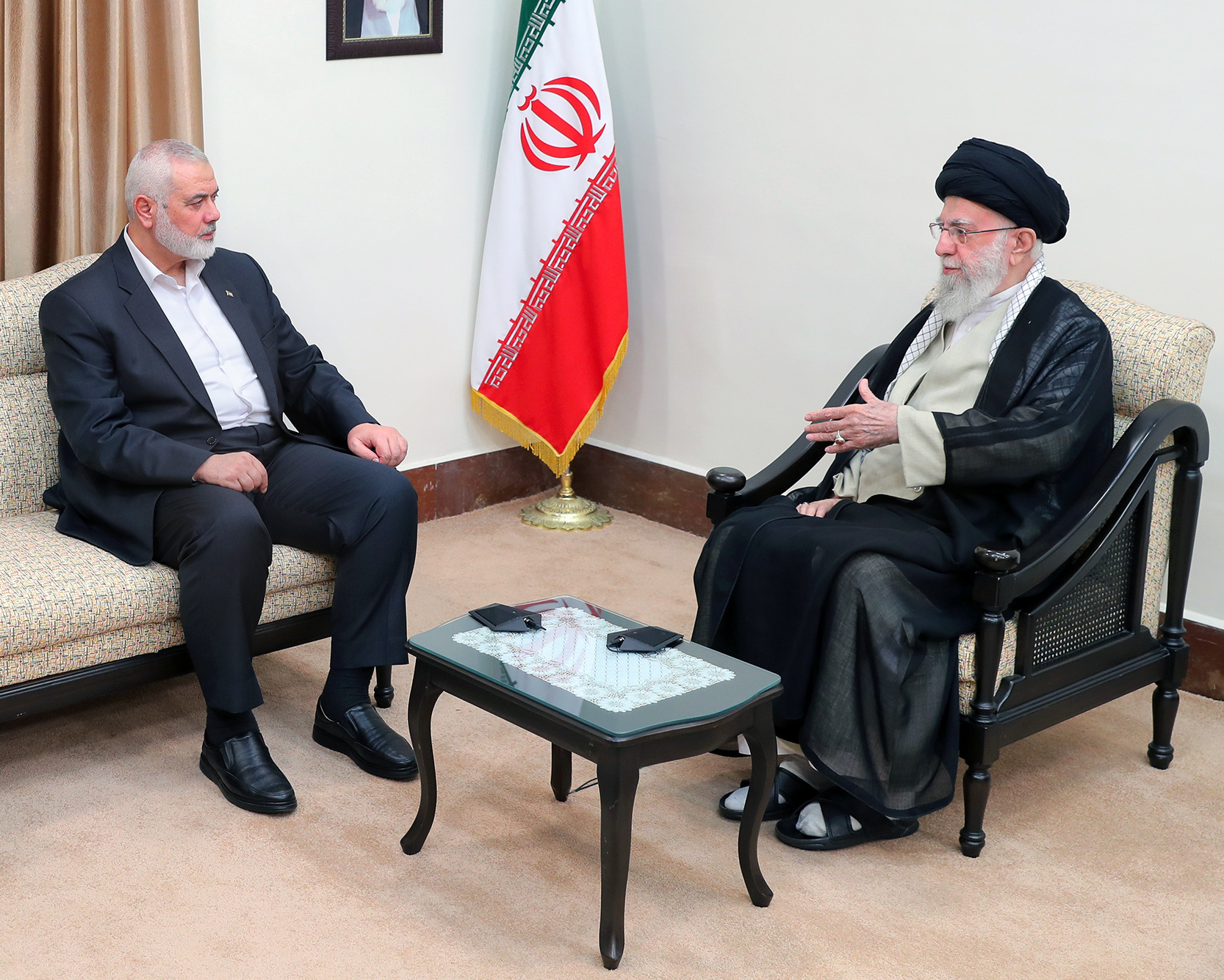
- Haniyeh (left) meeting with the Supreme Leader of Iran Ali Khamenei (right) hours before his death

- Assassination of Ismail Haniyeh (Tehran)
- Location: 35°49′10″N 51°24′57″E; Tehran, Iran
- Date: 31 July 2024; ~2:00 a.m. (IRST)
- Target: Ismail Haniyeh X
- Attack type: Explosion or projectile attack (disputed) (Note: An investigation by The New York Times concluded that the assassination was caused by an explosive device that was smuggled into the guesthouse where Haniyeh was staying, although the IRGC dismissed this claim and attributed Haniyeh's death to a "short-range projectile" launched by Israel out of the building he was in.)
- Deaths: Ismail Haniyeh; Wassim Abu Shaaban
- Perpetrator: Israel

On 31 July 2024, Ismail Haniyeh, the political leader of Hamas, was assassinated along with his personal bodyguard in the Iranian capital Tehran by an Israeli attack. Haniyeh was killed in his accommodation in a military-run guesthouse after attending the inauguration ceremony for Iranian president Masoud Pezeshkian. Nasser Kanaani, the spokesman of the Ministry of Foreign Affairs of Iran, condemned this assassination and said that Haniyeh's "blood will never be wasted".

The cause of Haniyeh's death is under investigation by Iran's Islamic Revolutionary Guard Corps (IRGC). Differing reports emerged as to how he was killed, ranging from a missile strike to a remotely detonated explosive device previously hidden in his bedroom at the IRGC-run guesthouse. According to analysts, the assassination exposed critical security flaws. The investigation has led to the arrest of over two dozen individuals, including senior intelligence and military officials, as well as staff from the guesthouse.

Haniyeh was a prominent figure within Hamas since the organization's founding in 1987. He previously served as the prime minister of the Palestinian Authority and as Hamas Chief in the Gaza Strip. In 2017, he was elected head of the Hamas Political Bureau. Haniyeh was the highest-ranking Hamas political leader killed since the start of the Gaza war.

== Background ==
=== Ismail Haniyeh ===
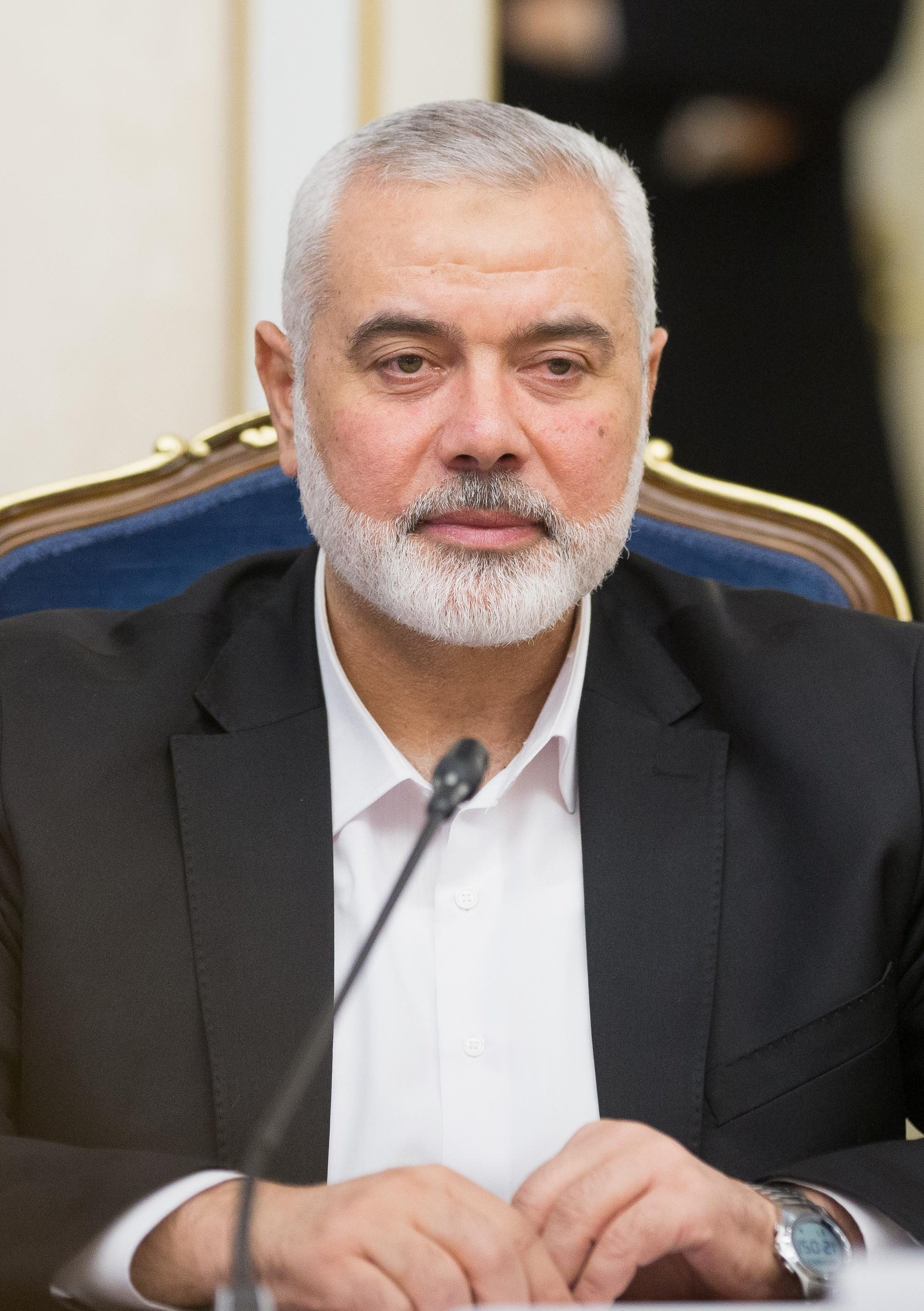
Haniyeh in 2020

Haniyeh was the political leader of Hamas, of which he had been a prominent member since its creation in the wake of the First Intifada against the Israeli occupation in 1987, and was elected head of Hamas's political bureau in 2017. He had been living in Qatar since leaving the Gaza Strip in 2019.

Footage from his office in the Qatari capital of Doha showed Haniyeh celebrating the October 7 attacks with other Hamas officials, before they prayed and praised God. According to The Telegraph, Haniyeh became the "public face" of the attack, publicly describing it as the start of a new era in the Israeli–Palestinian conflict. He justified the attack by the plight of the Palestinians under the Israeli occupation. In April 2024, three of his sons and four of his grandchildren were killed by Israel in the Gaza Strip.

The last known image of Haniyeh, reported by Iranian media, was taken on 30 July, a day before his death, at a theme park exhibition in Tehran featuring "axis of resistance" landmarks. In the photograph, he is accompanied by Ziyad al-Nakhalah, leader of Palestinian Islamic Jihad, and a group of men posing with a model of the Dome of the Rock.

=== Killings of Hamas officials ===
In response to the October 7 attack, Israel stated it would target Hamas leaders. On 2 January 2024, Hamas deputy Saleh al-Arouri was assassinated in an airstrike in Beirut. On 13 July 2024, Israel attempted to assassinate Hamas military chief Mohammed Deif, with the Israel Defense Forces announcing his death on 1 August. Hours before Haniyeh's death, Israel announced the assassination of Fuad Shukr, a senior Hezbollah leader in Beirut.

== Assassination ==
The initial report of Ismail Haniyeh's killing emerged from Iran's Islamic Revolutionary Guard Corps (IRGC), who provided limited specifics regarding the circumstances of his death, which it said occurred early on 31 July and indicated that the incident was under investigation. Haniyeh was in Iran to attend the inauguration of President Masoud Pezeshkian the previous day. Haniyeh's aide and bodyguard, Wassim Abu Shaaban, was also killed in the attack. According to Hamas, Haniyeh was killed by a "Zionist raid" on their residence. Israel declined to give any immediate comment.

After Haniyeh's death, Iranian security agents raided the IRGC-run guesthouse, placing all staff members under quarantine, and confiscating electronic devices. More than two dozen individuals, including senior intelligence and military officials, as well as staff members, were arrested. A separate team interrogated senior military and intelligence officials responsible for safeguarding the capital, placing several under arrest until the investigations were complete. The agents also combed through surveillance footage and guest lists at the guesthouse and monitored activities at Tehran's airports.

=== Location ===
Fars News said the strike targeted "the special residences for war veterans in north Tehran", but this was disputed by Tasnim News. According to Amwaj.media, Haniyeh was assassinated in the Sa'dabad Complex, where he had unexpectedly decided to stay the night. According to The New York Times, Haniyeh was staying at an IRGC guesthouse in the Neshat compound, slightly northwest of Sa'dabad. A Hamas official told BBC News that Haniyeh was accompanied by three other leaders of the group in the building. Ziyad al-Nakhalah was staying next door, but his room was not badly damaged. Medical personnel stationed in the compound immediately rushed to the site, but found both Haniyeh and Abu Shaaban dead.

=== Method ===
Differing reports have emerged as to how Haniyeh was killed.

A member of Iran's Supreme National Security Council told Amwaj.media that a quadcopter was used to target Haniyeh after his location was revealed by his bodyguards.

Al Mayadeen, a Lebanese outlet with close ties to Hezbollah, reported that Haniyeh was hit by a missile fired from outside Iran. Israel's Channel 12 and Sky News Arabia reported that the assassination was a missile strike but was launched from within Iran.

The New York Times, based on information provided by several Middle Eastern officials, including two Iranians and an American official, reported that Haniyeh was assassinated by a remotely detonated explosive device hidden in his room. Axios reported that the bomb was detonated by Mossad agents on Iranian soil. The device had been smuggled into the heavily guarded complex approximately two months earlier and was detonated once Haniyeh was confirmed to be in his room. This report was independently confirmed by the Jerusalem Post. According to The Telegraph, the IRGC believes that three explosives were planted in three separate rooms of the guesthouse by agents of its Ansar al-Mahdi Protection Corps who were recruited by the Mossad. The unit is responsible for protecting leaders of the Islamic Republic except the Supreme Leader and his family. The report also said that the two agents involved in planting the bombs had left Iran beforehand.

In a press conference on 31 July, Hamas official Khalil al-Hayya said "Haniyeh was visible in public so his assassination is not an intelligence achievement ... we are waiting for the full investigation by the Iranian authorities". Three Iranian officials described the breach as a catastrophic intelligence and security failure for Iran and an immense embarrassment for the IRGC, who use the compound for retreats, secret meetings, and accommodating prominent guests like Haniyeh.

On 3 August, the IRGC said that Haniyeh was killed with "a short-range projectile carrying about 7 kilograms (15 lb) of explosive materials" that was launched from outside the building he was staying in and accused Israel of responsibility in the killing and the United States of providing support. It called The New York Times story a completely fabricated "tribute to Goebbels".

=== Wasim Abu Shaaban ===
Wasim "Abu Anas" Abu Shaaban, Haniyeh's personal aide and bodyguard, was also killed. Abu Shaaban was born in Gaza City in 1988 and graduated with a BA from the Islamic University of Gaza. Early in his career, he was an aide to Said Seyam, Minister of Interior in the First Haniyeh Government. A member of the Nukhba force in the Al-Qassam Brigades, he participated in the 2014 Nahal Oz attack in which five Israeli soldiers were killed. In 2019, he began traveling with Haniyeh outside the Gaza Strip.

== Funeral ==
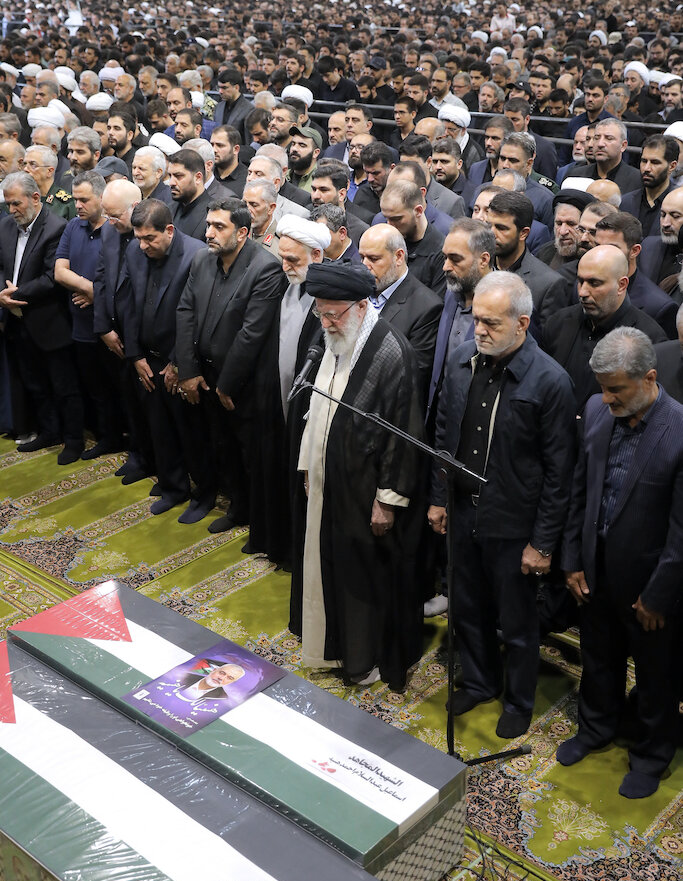
The funeral for Haniyeh at Tehran University with Ali Khamenei leading prayer

A funeral was held for Haniyeh at Tehran University on 1 August, with Iran's Supreme Leader Ali Khamenei leading prayers. From there, the bodies of Haniyeh and his bodyguard were taken on a five-kilometer procession to Azadi Square. Haniyeh's remains were then taken to Qatar for a ceremony at the Imam Muhammad ibn Abd al-Wahhab Mosque followed by burial in Lusail on 2 August. Among those who attended the ceremony in Qatar were the Qatari Emir Sheikh Tamim bin Hamad Al Thani, Turkish Vice-president Cevdet Yilmaz and Foreign Minister Hakan Fidan, and Hamas political bureau member Khalil al-Hayya. Diplomatic delegations from Pakistan and Malaysia were also present, as well as representatives from Fatah and the Palestinian Islamic Jihad.

== Aftermath ==
On 6 August, Hamas named Yahya Sinwar as the new political leader of Hamas replacing Haniyeh.

Iran's Supreme Leader Ali Khamenei ordered a direct attack on Israel in response to the assassination. Israeli Prime Minister Benjamin Netanyahu threatened that Israel will exact a heavy price for any aggression, and warned they would launch a preemptive strike on Iran. The editor of Kayhan newspaper, Hossein Shariatmadari argued the retaliation should include American interests as well. Hezbollah leader Hassan Nasrallah promised retaliation regardless of the consequences. Newly inaugurated President Masoud Pezeshkian reportedly urged Khamenei to refrain from attacking Israel, warning of possible severe consequences for Iran's economy and infrastructure. The U.S. warned Iran that a significant attack on Israel could pose a "serious risk" to its newly elected government and economy.

On 6 August it was reported that Russia had begun delivering air defense systems to Iran.

A few hours after Haniyeh's death was announced, the Al-Qassam Brigades claimed responsibility for a shooting and stabbing attack near Beit Einun, north of Hebron in the West Bank, which seriously wounded an Israeli man. They stated the attack was in retaliation for the assassination of Haniyeh and indicated more assaults would occur in the Hebron area. On August 4, two elderly Israeli civilians were killed in a stabbing attack in Holon by a Palestinian from Salfit. Hamas described the attack as a "natural response" to Haniyeh's assassination, among other reasons.

The secretary of the Security Council of Russia, Sergei Shoigu and the Jordanian foreign minister Ayman Safadi traveled to Iran to negotiate over the retaliation. The United States Central Command commander met with the head of the IDF to prepare against the retaliation. The United States military announced the deployment of an additional squadron of F-22 Raptors from the 1st Operations Group of the 1st Fighter Wing; 4,000 marines and 12 ships were deployed to the region (Note: Including the USS Theodore Roosevelt (CVN-71), Carrier Air Wing Eleven and six destroyers of the Destroyer Squadron 23 (the USS John S. McCain (DDG-56), USS Russell (DDG-59), USS Chafee (DDG-90), USS Pinckney (DDG-91), USS Halsey (DDG-97), and USS Daniel Inouye (DDG-118))) as a part of Carrier Strike Group 9 in the Persian Gulf and three Wasp-class amphibious assault ships, (Note: Including the USS Wasp (LHD-1), USS New York (LPD-21) and a third ship) two destroyers (Note: The USS Bulkeley (DDG-84) and USS Roosevelt (DDG-80)) and the 26th Marine Expeditionary Unit as a part of the USS Wasp amphibious ready group in the eastern Mediterranean Sea. The Carrier Strike Group 3 including USS Abraham Lincoln (CVN-72) and an unspecified number of cruisers and destroyers along with Carrier Air Wing Nine was also deployed, sent from the Pacific Ocean.

Airlines such as FlyDubai, Delta, Air India, Air Baltic, Lufthansa (including their Austrian Airlines brand), ITA Airways, and United Airlines suspended their flights to Israel. French citizens were ordered to leave Iran and avoid traveling there. Japan, New Zealand, Australia, the US, and the UK began evacuating their citizens from Lebanon.

On 3 August, Iranian stock markets reported a 1.1 trillion toman loss in investment, equivalent to around 3% in market value. An Israeli hacker group claimed to have attacked Iranian ISPs and government websites, while Iran claimed it conducted a cyberattack on Ben Gurion Airport.

Iran started jamming GPS signals over its airspace. The IDF started jamming GPS signals in Tel Aviv. The Shin Bet prepared a bunker for Prime Minister Benjamin Netanyahu, and the IDF was ordered to be ready to counterattack in case of an Iranian attack. United States Secretary of State Antony Blinken spoke with foreign ministers of the G7 to discuss the deescalation effort on 4 August, and sources said that he predicted an Iranian strike "within the next 24 to 48 hours". Germany's CDU party urged the German government to deploy the Bundeswehr as part of the coalition defending Israel from an Iranian attack. On 5 August, Israeli foreign minister Israel Katz said that his Iranian counterpart had messaged the Hungarian foreign minister Péter Szijjártó that they intend to attack Israel.

On 8 August NOTAMs were broadcast in Iranian and Lebanese airspaces. Iran continued to build up for an attack on Israel although the situation is complex, and a week later an attack had not occurred.

On 19 August, the Al-Qassam Brigades announced a return to the strategy of suicide attacks in Israeli cities, which they had previously abandoned in 2006, while Haniyeh was Prime Minister of Palestine and leader in exile of Hamas' political bureau.

On 1 October, Iran launched approximately 200 ballistic missiles toward Israel, marking the second direct attack since the April 2024 strikes. Iran cited the assassinations of Haniyeh, alongside Hezbollah leader Hassan Nasrallah, and IRGC General Abbas Nilforoushan as reasons for the retaliation.

== Reactions ==
=== Palestine ===
President Mahmoud Abbas condemned the killing, calling it "a cowardly act and a serious escalation". He also called for the Palestinian people to unite. Palestine's deputy permanent observer to the United Nations, Feda Abdelhady Nasser, called on the international community to stop Israel from dragging the Middle East into the "abyss". Former PLO member Hanan Ashrawi said that Israel's "gangster style" assassination of Haniyeh was made to "inflame the whole region".

Hamas said that it mourned the death of Haniyeh, who it said was killed in "a treacherous Zionist raid on his residence". Senior Hamas official Mousa Abu Marzook said that Haniyeh's assassination was "a cowardly act that will not pass in vain". Another senior official, Sami Abu Zuhri, accused Israel of killing Haniyeh, stating that it aims to break the will of Hamas and the Palestinians. Hamas's military wing, the Al-Qassam Brigades, called the assassination a "dangerous event" that will have "major repercussions across the entire region".

Palestinian Islamic Jihad released a statement saying that it "mourns with the Palestinian people and the Arab and Islamic nation" for the death of Haniyeh.

On 2 August, former Grand Mufti of Jerusalem Sheikh Ekrima Sa'id Sabri was arrested by Israeli police on suspicion of inciting "terrorism" after calling Haniyeh a "martyr" during a sermon in East Jerusalem.

=== Iran ===
Supreme Leader Ali Khamenei held an emergency Supreme National Security Council meeting with top Iranian officials following the assassination. Khamenei later stated that "With this action, the criminal and terrorist Zionist regime prepared the ground for harsh punishment for itself, and we consider it our duty to seek revenge for his blood as he was martyred in the territory of the Islamic Republic of Iran". The New York Times, citing Iranian officials, reported that he ordered direct strikes against Israel in response to the assassination. Foreign Ministry spokesman Nasser Kanaani condemned the assassination, stating that Haniyeh's "blood will never be wasted". President Masoud Pezeshkian condemned the assassination and said Iran will defend its territorial integrity and make those responsible regret their actions. The government announced three days of public mourning for Haniyeh. At the United Nations, Iran's ambassador Amir Saeid Iravani, called on the UN Security Council to condemn Israel and said that Iran had a right to respond in self-defence to the killing, which he described as part of "Israel's decades-long pattern of terrorism and sabotage targeting Palestinians and other supporters of the Palestinian cause across the region and beyond." He also accused the United States of responsibility over the assassination. The chief of staff of the Iranian armed forces, Mohammad Bagheri, suggested that the response could come as part of a coordinated effort with the Axis of Resistance.

The Tehran Stock Exchange fell 1.9%. Iran's chief prosecutor warned journalists against "spreading rumours".

A red flag was hoisted above the Jamkaran Mosque in Qom and the Milad Tower in Tehran was lit up in red overnight. A large banner was placed in Tehran's Palestine Square, featuring a portrait of Haniyeh alongside the Dome of the Rock, with a message in Farsi and Hebrew reading: 'Wait for severe punishment.'"

Opposition figures Masih Alinejad, Hamed Esmaeilion and Reza Pahlavi called the killing of Haniyeh the sign of iniquity of the Iranian regime.

=== Israel ===
The Israel Defense Forces told CNN they "don't respond to reports in the foreign media". The IDF did not release new security guidelines for civilians. Heritage Minister Amihai Eliyahu praised the assassination, saying that it "makes the world a little better", and that killing him was "the right way to cleanse the world from this filth." Israel increased security measures at its diplomatic missions and Jewish sites worldwide. The security of Israel's delegation in the 2024 Summer Olympics was increased due to fears of potential attacks. Then-Defense Minister Yoav Gallant addressed troops at an Arrow missile air-defense battery, stating, "We don't want war, but we are preparing for all possibilities." In December 2024, Defense Minister Israel Katz confirmed Israel's responsibility in the assassination of Haniyeh while delivering a threat to the Yemeni Houthi movement, stating, "We will strike [the Houthis'] strategic infrastructure and decapitate its leaders. Just as we did to Haniyeh, Sinwar, and Nasrallah, in Tehran, Gaza, and Lebanon—we will do in Hodeidah and Sanaa."

=== International ===
The United Nations Security Council held an emergency session on 31 July following the assassination, during which China, Russia and Algeria condemned the killing. The United States, United Kingdom and France discussed Iranian support for "destabilizing" actors in the Middle East, while Japan expressed concern over an all-out war in the region. UN Secretary-General António Guterres called the Israeli attacks on Tehran and in Beirut against Fuad Shukr a "dangerous escalation". A spokesman for the EU foreign policy chief, Josep Borrell, said that the bloc rejected "extrajudicial executions", adding that "No country, nor any nation stands to gain from further escalation in the Middle East". Following an extraordinary meeting in Jeddah, Saudi Arabia on 7 August, the Organisation of Islamic Cooperation issued a statement attributing "full responsibility" over the assassination to Israel, adding that it was a "serious infringement" of Iranian sovereignty.

==== State actors ====
- Afghanistan: The Afghan government's chief spokesman Zabihullah Mujahid praised Haniyeh as an "intelligent and resourceful Muslim leader" who made significant sacrifices. He stated that the Taliban-run administration considers it both an Islamic and humanitarian duty to defend Hamas.
- China: China's foreign ministry spokesperson Lin Jian condemned the assassination and said the government was "deeply concerned that this incident may lead to further instability in the regional situation". Chinese foreign minister Wang Yi addressed the implications of the assassination occurring on Iranian soil, stating, "China supports Iran in defending its sovereignty, security and national dignity in accordance with the law".
- Egypt: Egypt's foreign ministry said that the assassination of Haniyeh indicates that Israel has no political will for a ceasefire.
- France: French President Emmanuel Macron called on both sides to show restraint.
- Germany: The German government called for "maximum restraint" and de-escalation.
- Indonesia: Indonesian President Joko Widodo condemned the assassination as political violence and requested many people to condemn it. In a video statement, the Indonesian Ministry of Foreign Affairs also condemned the assassination, and stated that the assassination will lead into further destabilization of the region, provoke escalation of tension into full war, and damage any attempts for peace. Muslims prayed for Haniyeh at the Istiqlal mosque in Jakarta.
- Iraq: The Iraqi government strongly condemned the "aggressive" operation, calling it a violation of international law and a threat.
- Jordan: The Jordanian foreign ministry condemned the killing and expressed condolences to the Palestinian nation and the relatives of those killed in the attack.
- Malaysia: The Malaysian government condemned the assassination and called for dialogue. Former prime minister Mahathir Mohamad said that "They may kill Mr Haniyeh but not his ideas and what he stood for".
- Maldives: The Maldivian government condemned the assassination and called on all nations to "work together towards finding an urgent and lasting solution to the Gaza crisis".
- Mauritania: In Mauritania, two mass protests were held in front of the US embassy and the Grand Mosque in Nouakchott, with protestors condemning the attack and demanding the expulsion of the US ambassador in response to United States support for Israel in the Gaza war.
- Morocco: In Morocco, thousands of people protested in Rabat holding portraits of Haniyeh and flying Palestinian flags while burning Israeli flags.
- Netherlands: The Dutch far-right politician Geert Wilders praised the assassination, writing: "Good riddance!"
- Oman: Oman also described the assassination as a "blatant violation of international law".
- Pakistan: Pakistani Prime Minister Shehbaz Sharif called the assassination a "barbaric act" that violated international law, he later said that 2 August would be a day of mourning for Haniyeh, Shehbaz and other government officials offered funeral prayers in absentia for Haniyeh at Parliament House in Islamabad, separately, Jamaat-e-Islami chief Hafiz Naeem ur Rehman announced funeral prayers in absentia for Haniyeh. The government condemned the assassination and warned against Israeli "adventurism in the region".
- Qatar: Qatar, where Haniyeh regularly resided, strongly condemned the assassination describing it as a "heinous crime, a dangerous escalation, and a blatant violation of international and humanitarian law." Its prime minister, Sheikh Mohammed bin Abdulrahman Al Thani asked "how can mediation succeed when one party assassinates the negotiator on the other side?"
- Russia: Russian deputy foreign minister Mikhail Bogdanov condemned the assassination, calling it an "unacceptable political murder". Presidential spokesperson Dmitry Peskov said that the Kremlin "strongly condemned" the killing that would hinder peace across the region.
- Sri Lanka: The President of Sri Lanka, Ranil Wickremesinghe, condemned the assassination.
- Syria: Syria described the assassination as a "crime" and "a terrorist attack".
- Turkey: Turkish President Recep Tayyip Erdoğan condemned the killing of his ally and "brother" Haniyeh, stating that the attack was to disrupt the Palestinian cause, and that "Zionist barbarism will not reach its goals". The Turkish foreign ministry condemned the "heinous" assassination, stating that the government of Prime Minister Benjamin Netanyahu "has no intention of achieving peace". A day of mourning for Haniyeh was declared in Turkey for 2 August. Turkey's deputy ambassador to Israel was summoned by the Israeli foreign ministry after the Turkish flag at its embassy in Tel Aviv was lowered to half-mast for Haniyeh. People attended funeral prayers in absentia for Haniyeh in the Hagia Sophia Grand Mosque in Istanbul.
- United Arab Emirates: The UAE expressed "deep concern over the continued escalation" and said it was "closely monitoring the rapid regional developments".
- United States: President Joe Biden said Haniyeh's assassination "doesn't help" talks towards a ceasefire in the Gaza Strip. Defense Secretary Lloyd Austin said he did not think a wider war in the Middle East was inevitable and further added that this will resolve in a diplomatic fashion, adding that the United States would assist Israel if it were attacked, and reiterated "unwavering commitment" to the security of Israel.

==== Non-state actors ====
- Hezbollah: Hezbollah in Lebanon offered condolences without directly attributing blame to Israel, suggesting that the incident would bolster the determination of Iran-aligned groups to confront Israel.
- Houthi movement: Mohammed al-Houthi, president of the Supreme Revolutionary Committee in Yemen, condemned the attack, calling it "a heinous terrorist crime and a flagrant violation of laws and ideal values". Muslims performed the funeral prayer in absentia for Haniyeh in Sanaa.
- Sahrawi Arab Democratic Republic: The Polisario Front, which controls the Sahrawi Arab Democratic Republic in Western Sahara, condemned the attack.

==== Media and analysts ====
Peter Ricketts, UK's former National Security Advisor, was quoted by the BBC as saying that the assassination was "a very powerful demonstration of Israel's ability to reach out right across the region."

Writing for Foreign Policy, retired U.S. State Department official Hala Rharrit interpreted the assassination as an attempt by Israel to draw the United States into a war with Iran and destroy peace negotiations.

CNN noted that Haniyeh's killing was "a significant blow" to Hamas, occurring "at a fraught time for the Middle East," and added that it "also throws into question the future of Israel–Hamas negotiations." Nick Paton Walsh, writing for CNN, described the killing as humiliating for Iran and possibly for the IRGC, who might have been responsible for protecting Haniyeh. He noted that the assassination of two senior figures in Iranian-backed groups, Hezbollah and Hamas, within hours, challenges Iran's sovereignty and its image as a regional power capable of protecting its allies and raises questions about its potential response.

Trita Parsi, executive vice-president of the Quincy Institute for Responsible Statecraft, citing also the interpretation of Eran Etzion, former head of policy planning at Israel's Ministry of Foreign Affairs, argued that the assassination was related to Benjamin Netanyahu's desire to 'spark a larger war and drag the U.S. into it'.

The New York Times described the assassination as a shocking humiliation for the Iranian leadership, stating it was not "only an earth-shattering collapse of intelligence and security; nor only a failure to protect a key ally; nor evidence of the inability to curb the infiltration of Mossad; nor a humiliating reputational blow. It was all of those, and more. Perhaps most important, it delivered a jarring realization that if Israel could target such an important guest, on a day when the capital was under heightened security, and carry out the attack at a highly secure compound equipped with bulletproof windows, air defense and radar, then no one was really safe." Ali Vaez, the Iran director for the International Crisis Group, a non-profit think tank for conflict research and prevention, said that "the perception that Iran can neither protect its homeland nor its key allies could be fatal for the Iranian regime, because it basically signals to its foes that if they can't topple the Islamic Republic, they can decapitate it."

El País noted that Israel blames Iran as responsible for the instability in the Middle East. As Tehran supports the economic, military, and strategy of Hamas, Hezbollah and the Houthis, the assassination is sending the double message of acting against Hamas and, furthermore, doing it in Iran.

The Jerusalem Post described Haniyeh's death as a "major setback" for "Iranian-backed terrorism", adding that "while some are already viewing the killing of the Hamas terror leader as an escalation, the reality is that his death is a small amount of justice for the crimes of October 7." Avi Issacharoff, writing for Yedioth Ahronoth, wrote that Haniyeh's assassination is expected to prompt a response from Iran, which may carefully consider its actions given potential repercussions on its nuclear program. Issacharoff considers that Hamas continues to suffer significant setbacks.

The Associated Press speculated that Hezbollah might get involved in Iran's retaliation against Israel. They noted that Hezbollah could seek revenge for an Israeli strike that killed senior Hezbollah commander Fuad Shukr, which occurred a few hours prior to Haniyeh's assassination.

James Franklin Jeffrey considers that Israel aims to escalate the situation in order to restore respect for Israel's deterrence capabilities, undermine Iranian influence in the Middle East and obtain negotiations over a Gaza ceasefire that would bee more advantageous to their interests.

==== Censorship by social media ====
A Facebook post by Prime Minister of Malaysia Anwar Ibrahim regarding the assassination was taken down by Facebook's owner Meta Platforms, prompting him to accuse the social media firm of "cowardice". On 6 August, Meta issued an apology for the incident and restored the deleted content, blaming it on an operational error.

Turkey blocked access to Instagram after presidential communications director Fahrettin Altun accused it of "censoring" posts mourning the death of Haniyeh and other Hamas-related posts without proper reason. The blockage was lifted on 10 August.

== See also ==
- 2024 Lebanon electronic device attacks, another incident that exposed security flaws
- April 2024 Israeli strikes on Iran
- Assassination of Abdel Aziz al-Rantisi
- Assassination of Hassan Nasrallah
- Assassination of Mahmoud Al-Mabhouh
- Assassination of Qasem Soleimani
- Killing of Ahmed Yassin
- Killing of Yahya Sinwar
- Israeli strike on Hamas headquarters in Qatar
