= Yamas (Israel Border Police unit) =

Israeli elite anti-terror unit

Undercover Counter-Terrorism Unit
- YAMAS
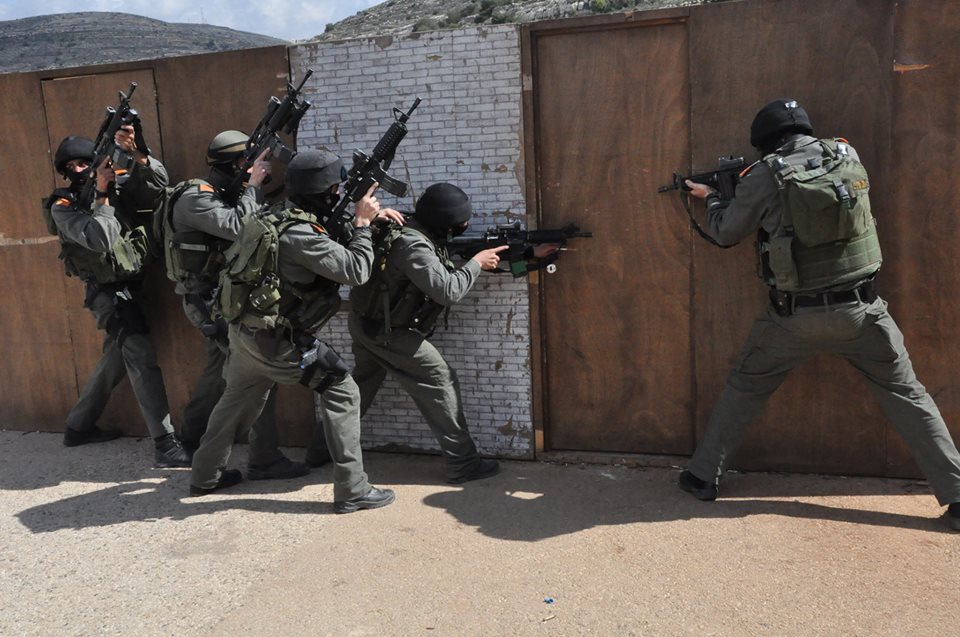
- Members conducting a training exercise
- Active: 1991–present
- Country: Israel
- Agency: Israel Border Police
- Type: Police tactical unit
- Role: Undercover counter-terrorism and law enforcement
- Part of: Israel Border Police

Notables
- Significant operation(s): Israeli–Palestinian conflict; First Intifada; Second Intifada; Gaza war

Yamas (Hebrew: יחידת המסתערבים, romanized: Yehidat HaMista'arvim, lit. 'the Mista’arvim Unit') is a tactical special unit of the Israeli Border Police. It conducts covert and special operations, counter-terrorism, irregular warfare, and high-risk arrest and search warrants.

It specializes in counterterrorism and provides operational assistance to the Israeli Security Agency (Shin Bet). The unit works in coordination with the Shin Bet and Israel Defense Forces. Members of this unit are primarily drawn from the Israeli police, but its operational command falls under the Israeli army.

It uses Arab disguises to infiltrate and conduct missions in Arab territories. It is considered a covert unit, known for its clandestine operations involving infiltration of Palestinian territory through disguises and civilian infiltration within occupied Arab areas. Its personnel do not wear uniforms and are not permitted to disclose their affiliation with the organization. Its primary mission is dealing with unrest and Arab demonstrations, and it also assists in special and complex arrest operations inside the Green Line.

The unit's sniper teams have won numerous awards and are considered among the best in Israel.

== Recruitment ==
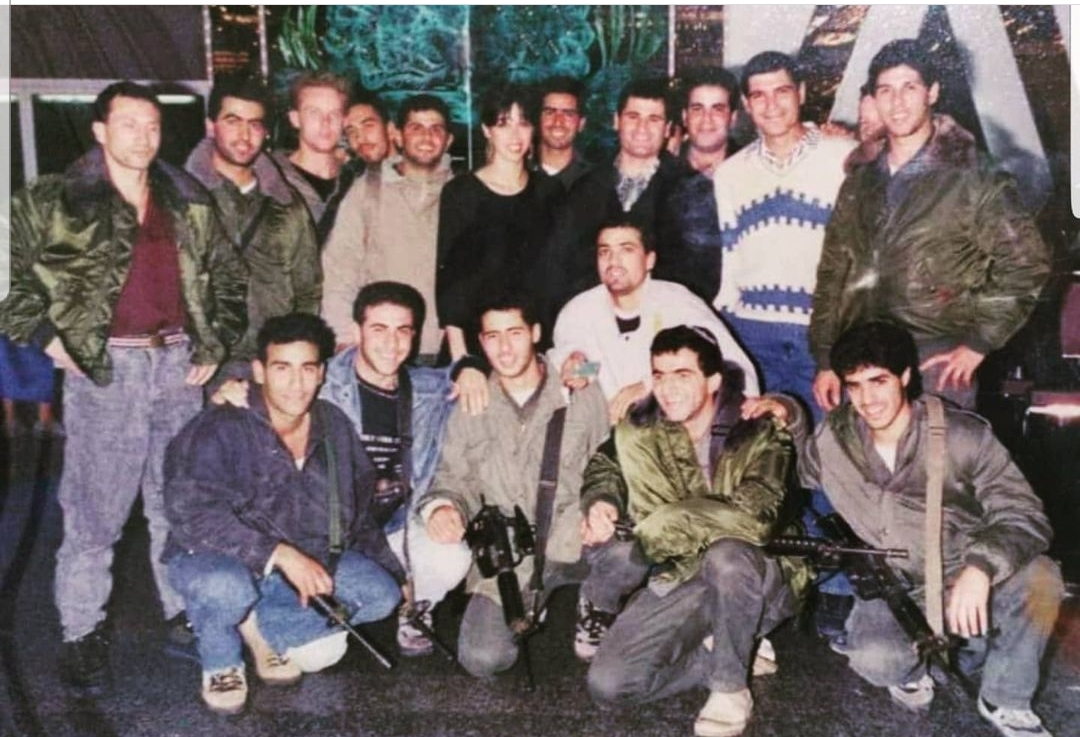
Group picture of Yamas members, 1991

Most YAMAS members do not have Jewish ethnic roots; rather, they belong to Arab minorities within Israel, especially the Druze. They possess knowledge of Arab and Islamic culture. Recruitment into YAMAS is highly selective, and most of its members are male and usually unmarried.

== Units ==
=== West Bank Unit ===
The second most important Mista’arvim unit. It belongs to the Border Guard forces and operates under the supervision of the Israeli army and the Israeli Security Agency (Shin Bet). It has been active since 1991.

=== Jerusalem Unit ===
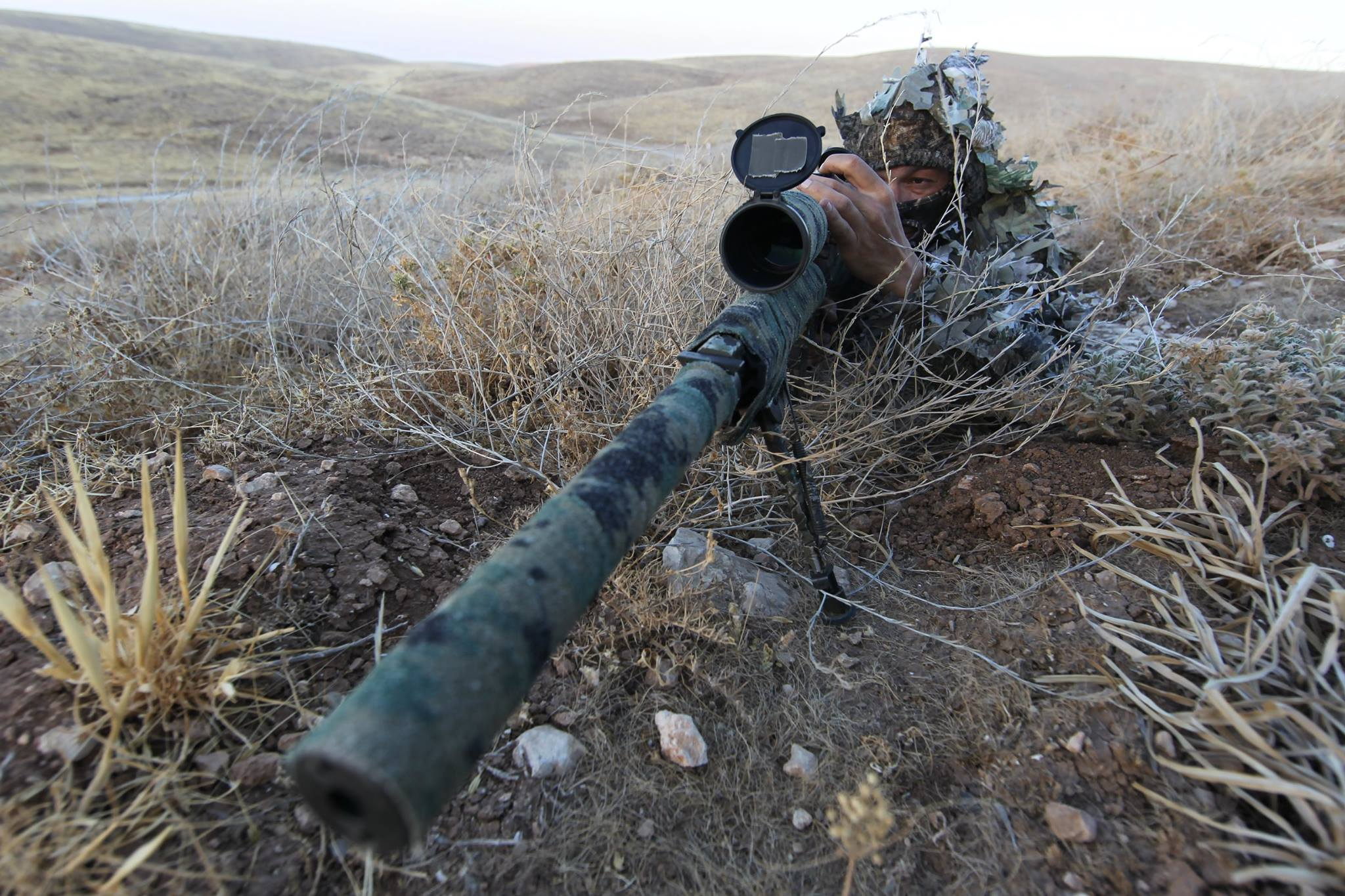
A sniper of the Israel Border Police's YAMAS Jerusalem unit

Focuses its activities in Jerusalem, particularly in East Jerusalem, carrying out missions similar to the previous units. An increase in the pace of operations by this unit has been expected in the recent period due to unrest in Jerusalem resulting from confrontations between Palestinians and Israeli settlers, followed by intervention from Israeli military units with various reinforcements.

=== Southern Unit ===
Operates to thwart attacks along the Egyptian border and the Gaza Strip. It functions under the Southern Command and specializes in shooting, sniping, and pursuit operations. The unit was formerly known as the Gaza Border Police, when it was part of the Border Police of the Gaza Strip. This unit received a Medal of Distinction last December after foiling dozens of operations over a six-month period in the southern region, along the Egyptian border and the fence facing the Gaza Strip.

== See also ==
- Shin Bet
- Israel Border Police
- Special forces of Israel
- Yamam
- Yasam
- Mista'arvim
- Israel Defense Forces
