= Free Hasakah Forces =

Militant organization in Hasakah

- سرية قوات الحسكة الحرة
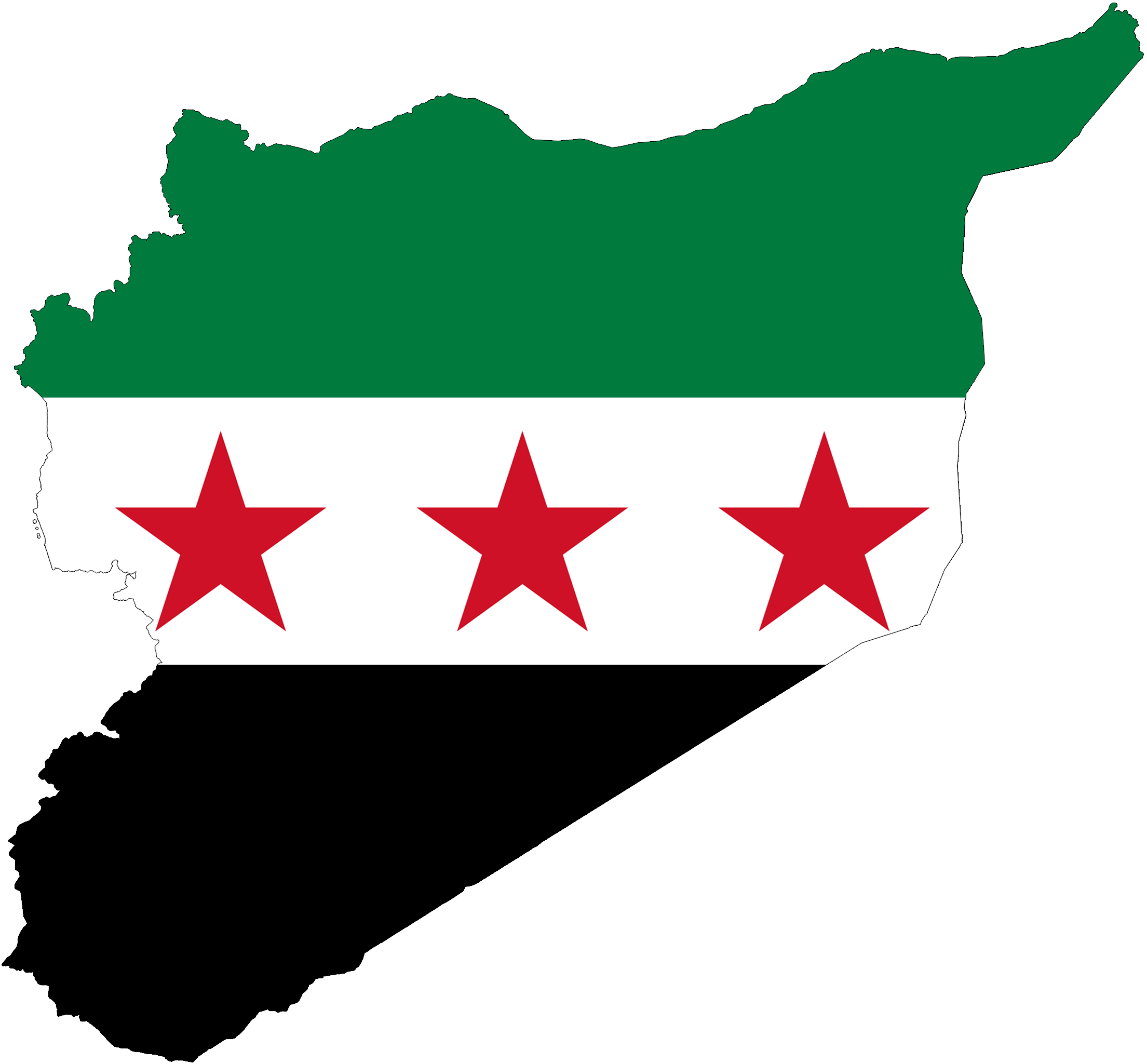
- Founder: Obaida al-Haskawi
- Dates active: 14 April 2025 – present (1 year, 2 months, 1 week and 1 day)
- Country: Syria
- Headquarters: Hasakah Governorate
- Ideology: Anti-Syrian Democratic Forces
- Wars: Syrian civil war; Turkish offensive in northern Syria (2024–present)

The Free Hasakah Forces (Arabic: سرية قوات الحسكة الحرة, romanized: sariat quaat alhasakat alhura) is a militant organization active in the Hasakah Governorate, Syria.

== History ==
As of 2025, the organization is led by Obaida al-Haskawi, supposedly its founder. Following a similar statement by the Ahrar al-Jazeera Brigade, on 14 April 2025 he threatened tribal chiefs who collaborated with the Syrian Democratic Forces, giving them 10 days to desert from the SDF Umbrella Organization.
