= Ansar al-Mahdi Protection Corps =

Military unit in Iran

- Active: 1979 — present
- Country: Iran
- Allegiance: Islamic Republic of Iran Armed Forces
- Role: Protection Corps
- Part of: Islamic Revolutionary Guard Corps
- Garrison/HQ: Tehran
- Engagements: Iran–Israel conflict; Twelve-Day War; 2026 Iran war

Commanders
- Current commander: Fathollah Jamiri

Ansar al-Mahdi Protection Corps are a military unit of Islamic Revolutionary Guard Corps, was established in 1979, during the Iranian Revolution to provide close physical protection for high-ranking political and military officials, excluding the Supreme Leader. The military unit was founded in the early days of the Islamic Republic of Iran, by Ruhollah Khomeini, under the name of "Revolutionary Guard", following the attempted assassination of Akbar Hashemi Rafsanjani, Khomeini tasked the Revolutionary Guard with the responsibility of protecting the lives of the officials.

Brigadier General Fathollah Jamiri has served as the commander of the Ansar al-Mahdi since April 2020, having begun his military career during the Iran-Iraq War in 1988. Prior to Jamiri, Brigadier General Ali Nasiri led the unit, facing errors in protection, including the 2020 assassination of nuclear scientist Mohsen Fakhrizadeh, where Nasiri noted the deployment of protective teams but acknowledged operational shortcomings.

According to the IRGC, the Mossad allegedly hired members of the military unit to carry out the assassination of Ismail Haniyeh, placing explosives through the building, demonstrating that Ansar al-Mahdi has serious deficiencies in its function of protecting; it is understood that the unit is not prepared to face threats.
