= Yasam =

Israeli special police unit

Coordinates: 27.37°N 86.28°E

Special Patrol Unit
- יחידת סיור מיוחדת; Yeḥidat Siyur Meyuḥedet
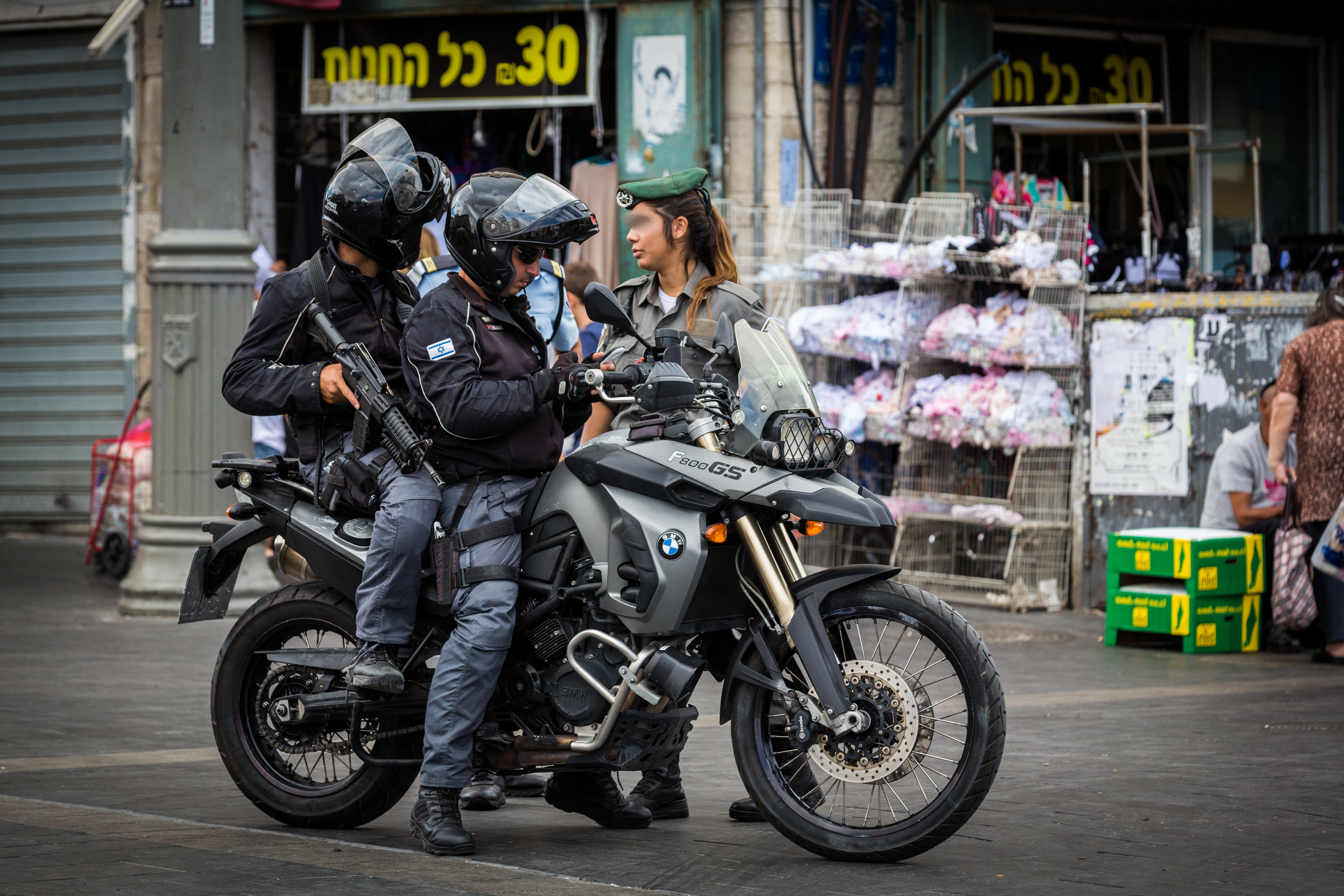
- Yasam patrol on a BMW F800GS in Jerusalem, July 2014.
- Active: 1990–present
- Country: Israel
- Type: Police tactical unit, riot police
- Role: counter-terrorism, riot control, crowd control
- Part of: Israel Police

Notables
- Significant operation(s): First Intifada; Second Intifada; Israeli disengagement from the Gaza Strip

The Yasam (Hebrew: יס"מ) is the Israel Police's Special Patrol Unit (Hebrew: יחידת סיור מיוחדת, romanized: Yeḥidat Siyur Meyuḥedet), specializing as a riot and police tactical unit dedicated to counter-terrorism, riot and crowd control, and other special operations.

The Yasam were heavily involved in the Israeli disengagement of August 2005 and Amona evacuation, and have been under widespread criticism for these and other operations.

Officers are often recruited from IDF and Border Police special forces, having all served in combat units of one kind or another.

Yasam officers wear dark trousers and jackets with a black cap embossed with their unit's insignia.

In Jerusalem, Yasam officers are often seen patrolling Jaffa Road (the city's main thoroughfare) on motorbikes which acts as a deterrent against terrorist attacks. They are involved in breaking up late-night fights outside bars. They have also guarded the Women of the Wall from protestors at the Kotel, and performed counter-terror and riot duties against Palestinians in East Jerusalem.

== Weapons and equipment ==
=== Motorcycle ===
- BMW F800GS

=== Weapons ===
- Glock pistol
- M4 Carbine
- M5 Carbine

== See also ==
- Yamam
