= 124 Squadron (Israel) =

Helicopter unit of the Israeli Air Force

124th Squadron IAF
- טייסת 124
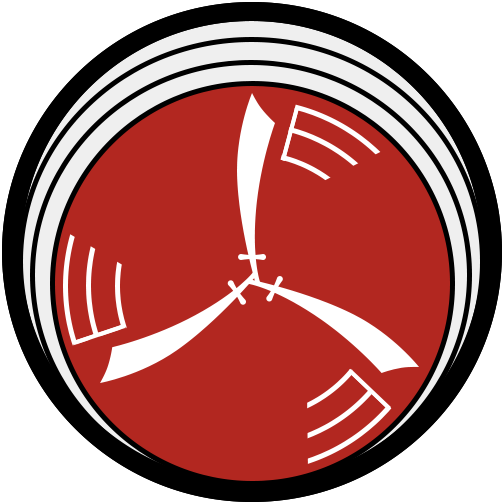
- Logo of the Squadron
- Active: January 1, 1958 – present
- Country: Israel
- Allegiance: Israel Defense Forces
- Branch: Israeli Air Force
- Type: Helicopter Squadron
- Role: Multipurpose
- Garrison/HQ: Palmachim Airbase
- Nickname: Rolling Swords Squadron

Aircraft flown
- Helicopter: S-70A and UH-60

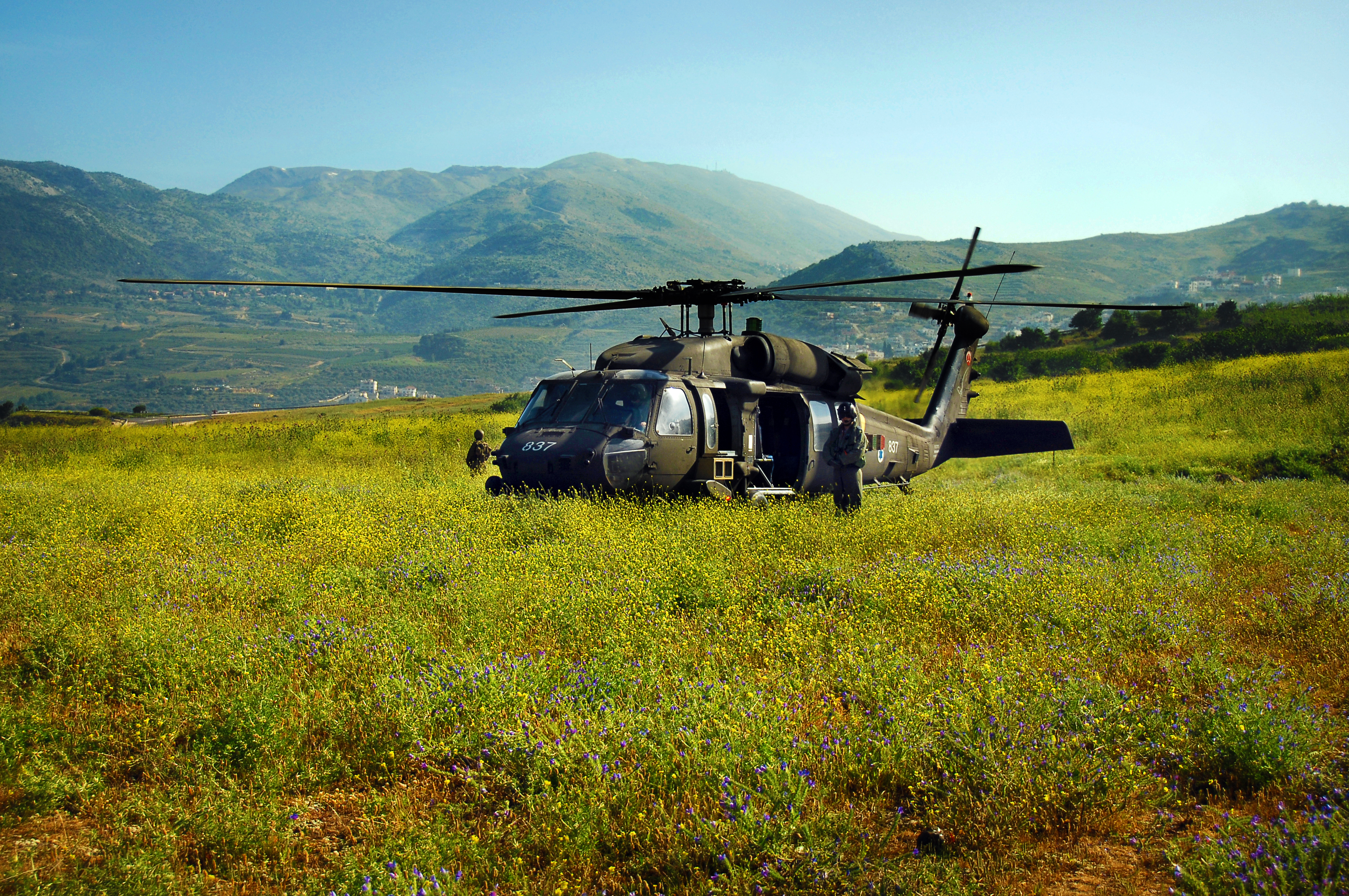
A 124 Squadron Blackhawk on the Golan Heights

124 Squadron, established January 1, 1958, is a squadron of the Israeli Air Force, also known as Rolling Sword Squadron.

124 Squadron is a helicopter squadron of S-70A and UH-60 Black Hawks based at Palmachim Airbase.

== History ==
The first helicopters arrived at the squadron in May 1951, which was then a wing. These were prototypes of the three-seater "Hiller 360" helicopters that arrived for examination and trial, but were outdated and in a poor state of maintenance.

In January 1953, the Air Force's first helicopter rescue was carried out by the "Flipping Sword" gef, when a police ship overturned off the coast of Nahariya in a stormy sea. The two officers managed to reach a small rocky island off the coast and were rescued by a Hiller 360 helicopter.

On November 3, 1956, three days before the end of Operation Kadesh, the first two Sikorsky S-55 attack helicopters.

On November 10, 1956, the wing was transferred to the 103rd Squadron in Tel Nof . On July 25, 1957, the branch also received a single Aérospatiale Alouette II helicopter.

On January 1, 1958, the branch became an independent squadron called Squadron 124 under the command of Captain Uri Yarom at the Tel Nof Airbase. In the same year, the squadron received more Sikorsky S-58 helicopters as well as three more Aérospatiale Alouette II helicopters.

In 1962, as a tribute from the German Minister of Defense Franz Josef Strauss, 24 modern Sikorsky 58-S helicopters arrived.

Operation Pioneer was carried out by the squadron on the night between August 10 and 11, 1963. A force of a patrol of the General Staff was assigned to an intelligence mission.

Operation Shrekrak was carried out by the squadron on the night between March 4 and 5, 1964. A force of a general patrol was assigned to an intelligence mission.

Operation Sheldag was carried out on the night between November 13 and 14, 1964. A force of a general patrol was assigned to an intelligence mission.

Operation Kahl was carried out on the night of December 1–2, 1965. A force of a patrol of the General Staff was assigned to an intelligence mission.

On February 4, 1966, a huge fire broke out in Beit Zim in Tel Aviv. The squadron's S-58 helicopter was launched and rescued 30 survivors from the roof of the building.

On July 1, 1969, two helicopters from the squadron participated in the "Bostan 25A" operation in the area of Ras Zafarna in Egypt.

On January 22, 1970, two helicopters from the squadron participated in the "Rhodes" operation to occupy the island of Shedoan at the entrance to the Gulf of Suez.

During the Yom Kippur War, the squadron evacuated 890 personnel and rescued 25 aircrew, as well as four enemy pilots.

Operation Fallout was an IDF raid operation conducted on the night between June 8 and 9, 1978, in which fighters from the Parachute Brigade and the 13th Fleet, who were transported to their destination in the cruise ships of the missile ships, raided a base of terrorists in Lebanon. Evacuating the wounded from the Lebanese coast to the navy ship on which they received first aid And from there to Israel it was done by a heron helicopter of Squadron 124.

During the first intifada, Squadron 124 took an active part in the ongoing operational activities of the IDF, including operations to disperse demonstrations, using new means developed especially for this purpose, including: a system for throwing small gravel stones (the Segrir-Aba system), a system for throwing smoke and tear gas grenades. The helicopters were also used to hunt for wanted persons and rescue and evacuate the injured.

The squadron was briefly assigned two ex-United States Coast Guard Eurocopter HH-65 Dolphin. They were reassigned to the then new 193 Squadron (Israel) in June 1987.

In the morning of January 3, 2002, the ship Karin A loaded with weapons sailed between Saudi Arabia and Sudan. Helicopters of squadron 124 arrived above the ship and from them fighters of Sheitat 13 and a bomb disposal force from the Yalam unit dangled onto the ship's deck. The fighters took control of the ship and its crew members in about 7 minutes.

In the first days of the Gaza war, the squadron was involved in rescuing casualties and flying troops to various missions. On June 8, 2024, during the Arnon operation to rescue four abductees, a helicopter from the squadron flew the abductee Noa Argamani from the Gaza coast to Sheba Hospital.
