= 210 Squadron (Israel) =

Israeli unmanned reconnaissance aircraft squadron

210th Squadron IAF
- טייסת 210
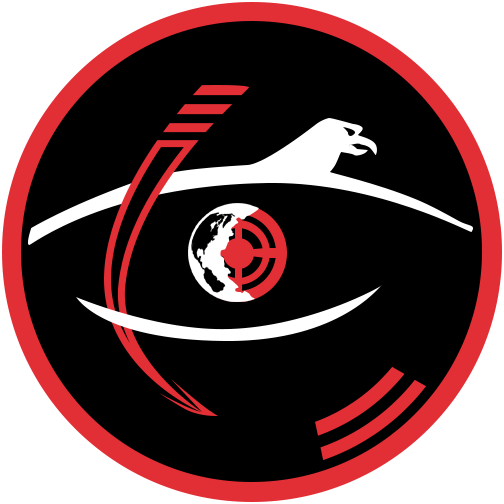
- Logo of the Squadron
- Active: 2010 – present
- Country: Israel
- Allegiance: Israel Defense Forces
- Branch: Israeli Air Force
- Type: Unmanned Aerial Vehicle Squadron
- Garrison/HQ: Tel Nof Airbase
- Nickname: White Eagle Squadron

Insignia
- Patch

Aircraft flown
- IAI Eitan

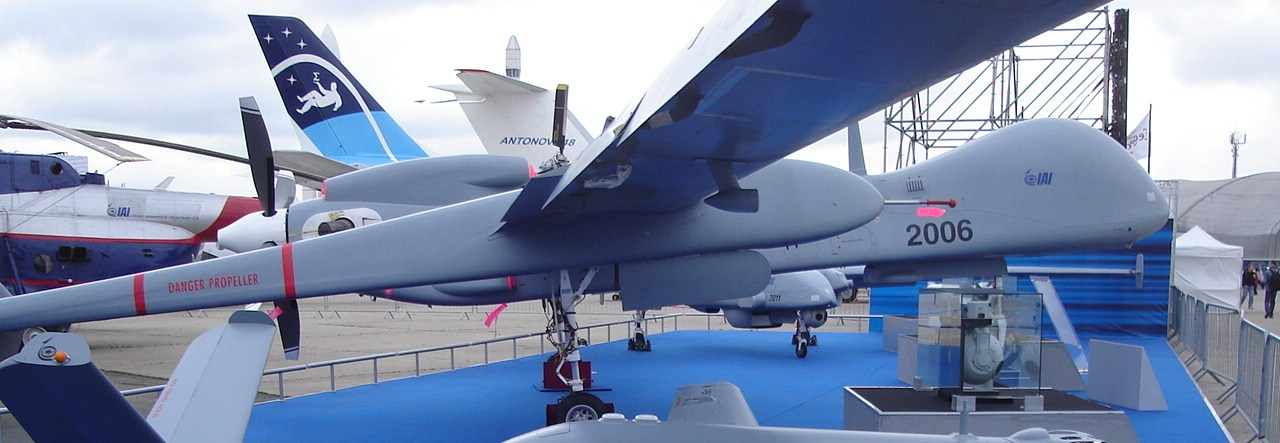
IAn AI Eitan at the 2007 Paris Air Show

210 "White Eagle" Squadron of the Israeli Air Force is an IAI Eitan squadron based at Tel Nof Airbase.

== History ==
The squadron was inaugurated on December 20, 2010, at a ceremony at Tel Nof, and accepted its first UAV in February 2011. Its first commander was Lt. Colonel S. It is currently led by Lt. Colonel A.

210 Squadron is the IAF's first UAV unit to operate away from the IAF's traditional UAV hub at Palmachim. Tel Nof offers a longer runway and the more extensive infrastructure required by the two-ton class Eitan, and will help the integration of UAV operations into the IAF's core operational thinking. The squadron's aircraft wear a Light Compass Grey scheme, and feature tail art in the shape of a white eagle against a black background on their vertical stabilizers.

On January 29, 2012, one of the squadron's UAVs crashed shortly after takeoff from Tel Nof. falling near Kibbutz Hafetz Haim. The aircraft suffered damages estimated at several million dollars. The Eitan fleet was grounded for several months until two investigative teams, one by the air force and another by Israel Aircraft Industries, submitted their findings. The aircraft was found to have gone down during flight testing of a navigational component fitted on one of its wings, which broke. After additional tests by IAI, the air force permitted the Eitan back into the air in September 2012.

Two months later the squadron took part in Operation Cast Lead. 210 Squadron and the Eitan have been mentioned amid the talk of a possible Israeli strike against Iran's nuclear program. The UAV's high service ceiling, its ability to stay a loft for a considerable amount of time, and large payload and range, have made it especially suited for long-range and advanced reconnaissance and intelligence missions. The aircraft have been linked to possible Israeli strikes against Iranian arms convoy in Sudan.

In 2017, the squadron received "Ethan" aircraft of an improved model with increased carrying capacity and new capabilities. which increased the SDA of the squadron by 50%.

During the Gaza war, it also played a key role in targeting Hamas militants while flying from Tel Nof Airbase.
