= LOTAR Eilat =

Israeli special forces mainly consisting of reserved personnel and volunteers

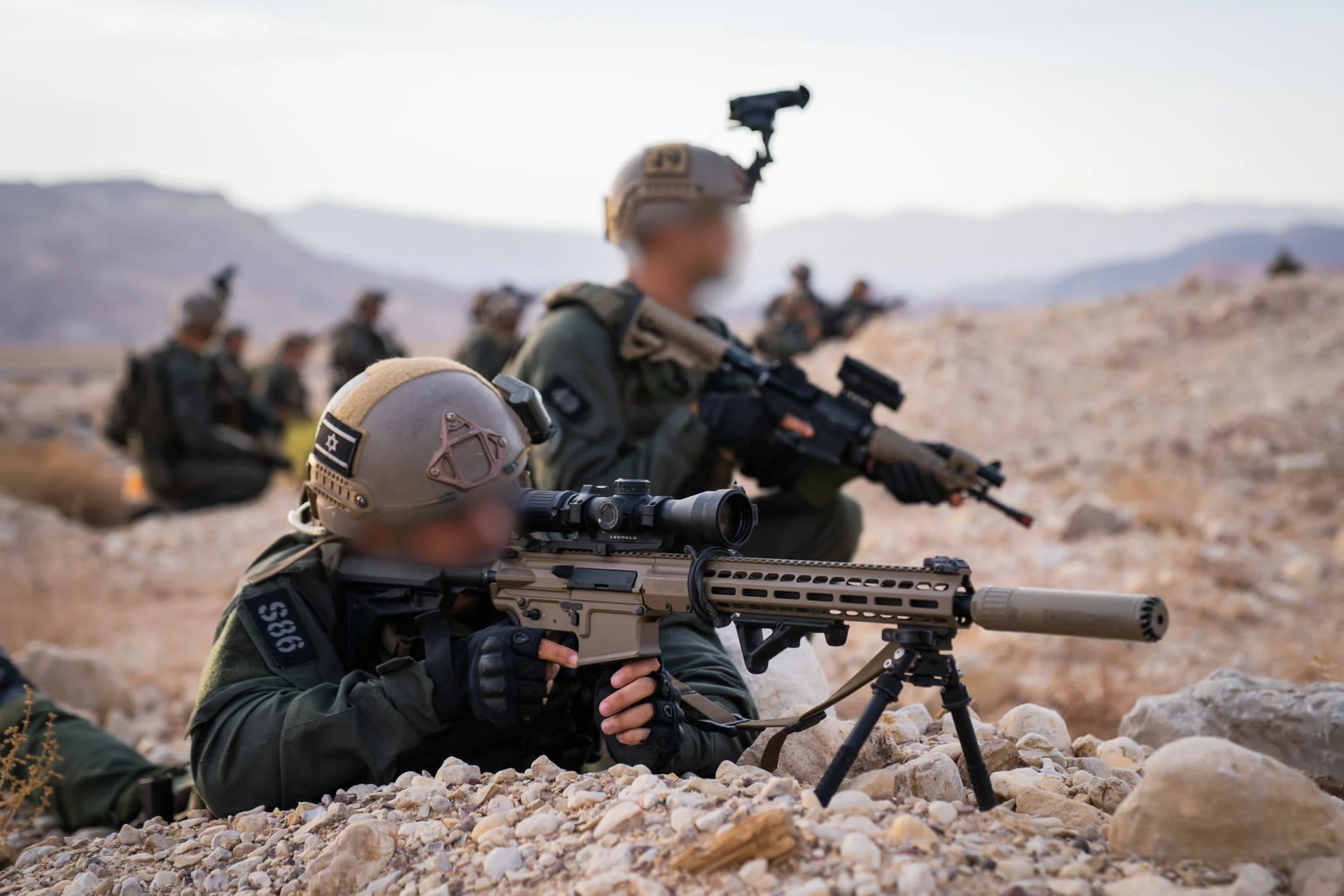

LOTAR Eilat (in hebrew: לוט״ר אילת) is an IDF sayeret (special operations forces) unit whose mission is to protect the safety of the residents and tourists of Eilat against urban terrorism and is also specialized in air assault operations, anti-irregular military in urban areas, casualty evacuation, commando style raids, counter-sniper tactics, CQB/CQC, desert warfare, executive protection, force protection, hostage rescue, maneuver warfare, and reconnaissance.

Unlike the other units within the Israeli army, Lotar Eilat is made up of reservists between the ages of 20 and 60 who live in Southern District and volunteer to protect their city. In their regular service in the army, they were part of different elite units. Afterwards, they took advantage of their training and experience to be part of this special operations teams.

== City ==
Eilat is one of the most visited cities in Israel. Every day, a large number of buses loaded with tourists from other countries of the world come to visit the beaches and the hotels of this southern Israeli city. Due to its remoteness to the country's major urban centers and its proximity to the borders between Israel-Egypt and Israel-Jordan, the city is a very prone and vulnerable place to terrorist attacks that may alter the tranquillity of the zone. This is the reason why the LOTAR Eilat Unit was created.

Because the city is far from the country's center, an immediate urban counterterrorism force is needed, and the unit members must always be ready for action. When required, they must leave everything they are doing and join the unit.

The time they have to arrive is very short, so they must respond to the calls quickly. Once the alarm goes off, they only have seven minutes to get to the location and another seven additional minutes to put on their uniforms and equipment. That makes a total of 14 minutes. They can proceed fast since these men meet to perform drills and train for an eventual situation several times a year.

== History ==
The unit first operated in 1989, when a Jordanian soldier entered Kibbutz Lotan, kidnapping a hostage. The LOTAR Eilat team responded to the incident and successfully raided the house, neutralizing the Jordanian soldier and releasing the hostage.

An Iranian passenger plane was hijacked in September 1995 by an emotionally disturbed individual. The unit handled the incident successfully, and after the negotiations, the hijacker was delivered without causing significant damage.

Five years later, a hijacker took control of a plane in Dagestan, heading to Moscow along with fifty of its passengers, with a fake bomb. The plane landed, and the kidnapper surrendered. The Yamam unit also participated in this operations.

In October 2000, the Lotar unit was needed in several operations due to constant clashes during the Second Intifada conflict.

== Recent times ==
In recent times, the Lotar unit has taken part in a famous episode in a hotel in the city of Eilat, where a US citizen who was employed at the same hotel opened fire against the people, causing the death of a person and he afterwards took refuge in one of the hotel rooms. Though the agents attempted to negotiate to make him surrender, because of the attacker's resistance and his continuous shots, the forces were forced to open fire on him because he had aroused panic among a large number of hotel guests who were resting there during the holiday of Succot.

Due to how they perform in training and the success of their operations, LOTAR Eilat is among the special operations forces units of the Israel Defense Forces, together with others like Sayeret Matkal or Shayetet 13.
