= Yamam =

Israeli police counterterrorism unit

National Counter-Terrorism Unit (Yamam)
- ימ״מ
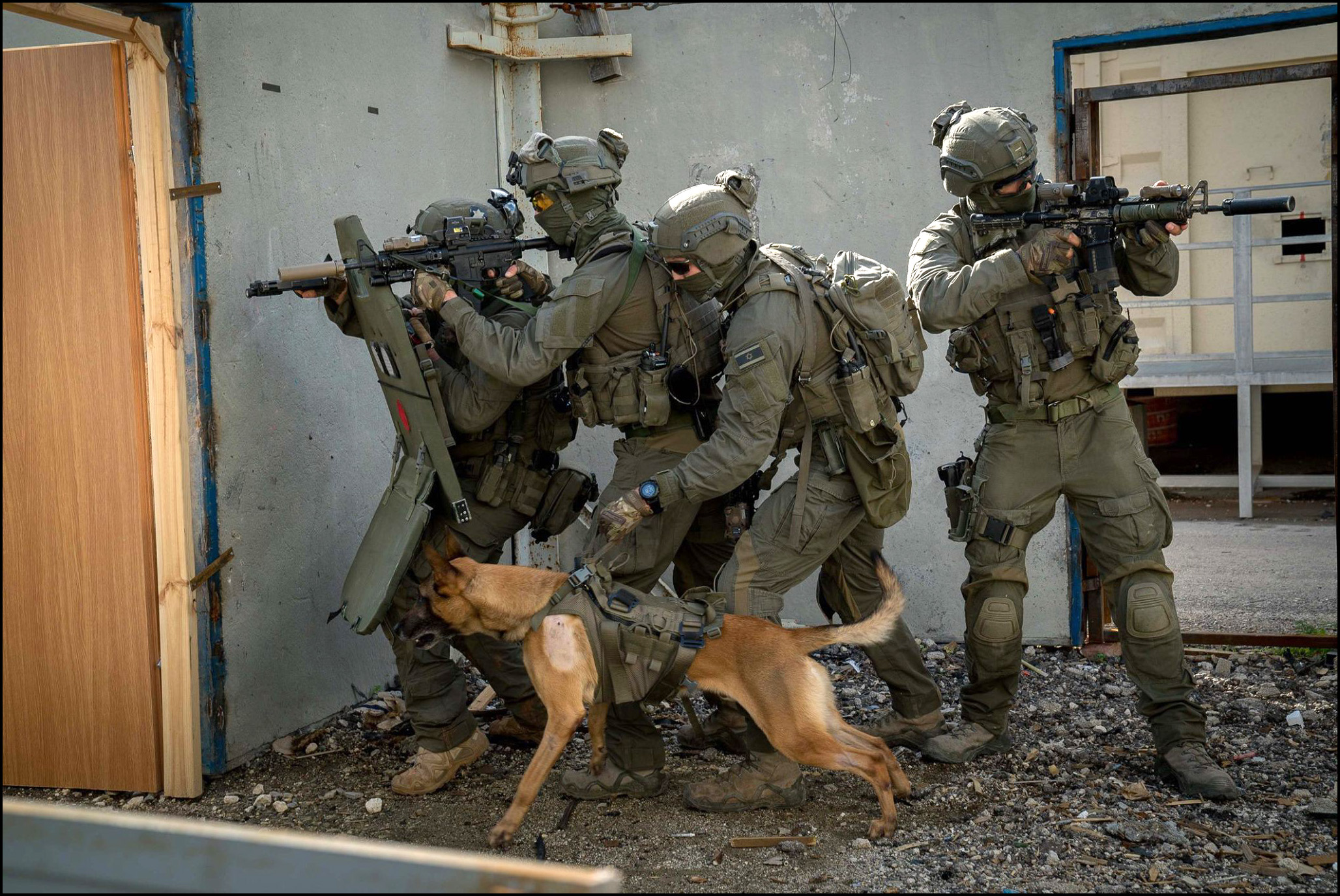
- Yamam officers in full gear during raid training, armed with M4A1 carbines and operating police dog (K9)
- Active: 1974–present
- Country: Israel
- Agency: Israel Police
- Type: Police tactical unit
- Role: Domestic counter-terrorism, hostage rescue and law enforcement
- Part of: Israel Border Police
- Motto: אֶרְדּוֹף אוֹיְבַי וְאַשִּׂיגֵם, וְלֹא אָשׁוּב עַד כַּלּוֹתָם (I will pursue my enemies and I will overtake them, and I will not return until they are destroyed) (Psalm 18:37)

Structure
- Operators: ≈200 officers

Notables
- Significant operation(s): Israeli–Palestinian conflict; First Intifada; Second Intifada; Gaza war

Yamam (Hebrew: היחידה הלאומית המיוחדת ללוחמה בטרור, lit. 'National Counter-Terrorism Unit') is Israel Police's counter-terrorism unit, one of four special units of the Israel Border Police. The Yamam is capable of both hostage-rescue operations and offensive take-over raids against terrorist targets in civilian areas. Besides military and counter-terrorism duties, it also performs tactical unit duties and undercover police work.

== History ==
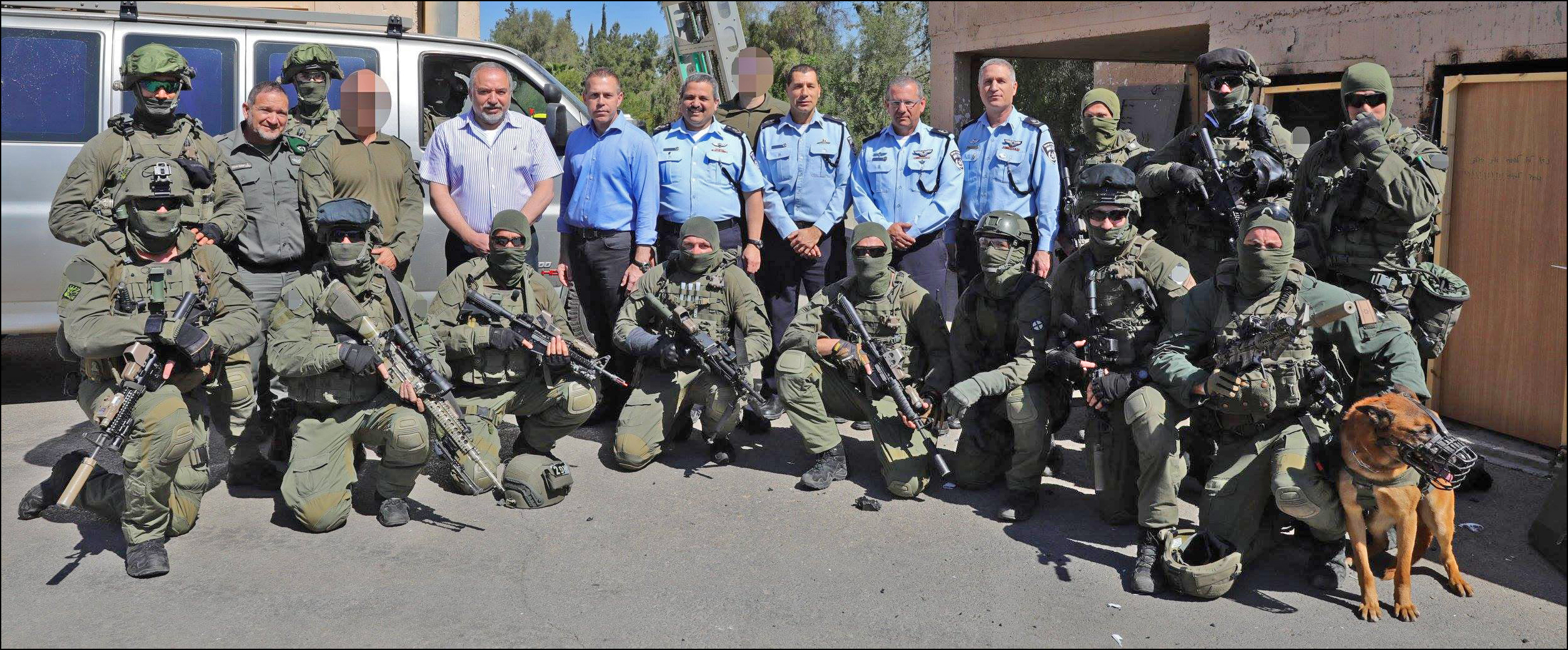
YAMAM operators in a special visit by Israeli officials, 2017

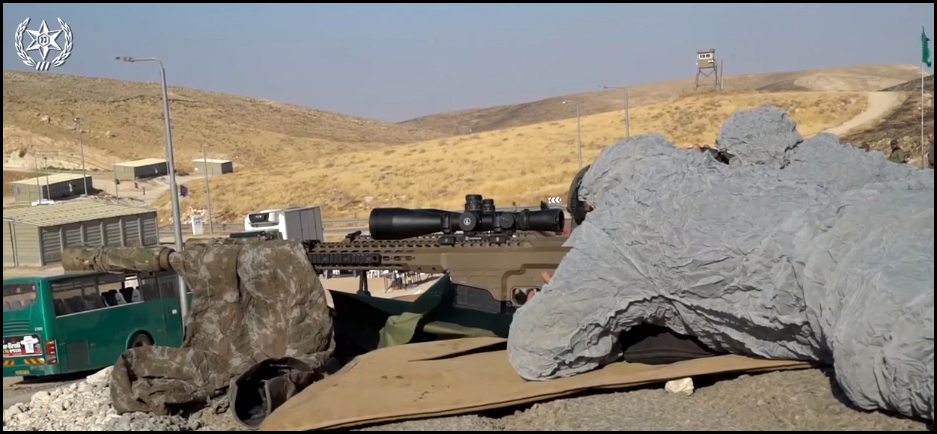
YAMAM snipers with Barrett MRAD and ghillie suits during a counter-terror/hostage-rescue demonstration in the Israel Border Police's training base.

The Yamam was established in late 1974 after the Ma'alot massacre, where a failed rescue operation by the Sayeret Matkal commando unit of the Israel Defense Forces resulted in the murder of 21 schoolchildren before the hostage takers were killed.

=== Operational record after the Second Intifada ===
On May 23, 2006, a Yamam force, using intelligence provided by the Shin-Bet, arrested Ibrahim Hamed after an IDF Caterpillar D9 armored bulldozer started ramming the house in which he was hiding. On September 23, 2014, a Yamam force, together with Israel Defense Forces Combat Engineering Corps bulldozers, killed the two Hamas members accused of killing three Israeli teens in June 2014.

=== Operational record during Operation Breakwater (2022–2023) ===
Video from the helmet camera of YAMAM operator.

On April 2, 2022, YAMAM operators killed three Palestinian Islamic Jihad militants, reportedly on their way to an attack. On August 19, 2022, YAMAM operators killed Ibrahim al-Nabulsi, a commander of the Lions' Den militant group. On October 25, 2022, YAMAM led a combined raid (with the Israel Defense Forces and the Shin Bet) on what the IDF said was the Lions' Den headquarters and bomb lab in Nablus. On January 26, 2023, YAMAM led a combined raid (with the Israel Defense Forces and the Shin Bet) on Jenin refugee camp, which the IDF said was targeted against members of Palestinian Islamic Jihad who were planning an attack. Nine Palestinians were killed in the attack, including an unarmed civilian.

=== Operational record during the Hamas led-attack on October 7, 2023, and afterwards ===
On October 7, 2023, YAMAM forces were the first to respond to the October 7 attacks and the numerous massacres conducted by Palestinians in Israeli communities and towns. YAMAM operators killed in combat 200 armed Hamas gunmen and conducted several hostage rescue operations. YAMAM lost nine operators and officers who were killed in action.

On February 12, 2024, YAMAM rescued two Israeli hostages in Rafah, together with the Shin Bet and the Israel Defense Forces, in a military covert raid code-named Operation Golden Hand.

On June 8, 2024, YAMAM rescued four hostages in the Nuseirat Refugee Camp, together with the Shin Bet and the Israeli Defense Forces, in Operation Arnon. During the operation, Squad Commander Arnon Zamora, 36, was killed in combat. Noa Argamani, an Israeli citizen kidnapped in the Re'im Music festival massacre, was rescued in the operation. During the operation, according to the IDF, under 100 Palestinians were killed. According to Hamas, 210 were killed.

Body camera footage from a Yamam soldier during rescue operation on June 8, 2024.

== Selection and training ==
Yamam recruits veterans of Israel Defense Forces and Israel Border Police combat units who completed their compulsory service. Applicants must have served in a regular IDF combat unit and completed a commander's course (Rifleman 08), served in an IDF special forces unit, or served in a Border Police Mista'arvim unit. The unit's training course lasts seven months, divided into three months of basic counter-terrorism training, during which recruits go through basic combat training as well as training in hand-to-hand combat, urban combat, and use of specialized weapons, followed by four months of advanced training.

The YAMAM trains and operates entry and breaching teams, rappelling team, snipers, K9 operator, paratroopers, EOD operators and undercover operators. This allows the unit to be independent of other units and respond rapidly to terror attacks and emergency cases.

== Honors ==
The unit received number of honor citations (TZALASH, ציון לשבח) from the Commissioner of the Israeli Police: 2011, 2014, 2016, 2020, and 2022.

In 2022 the unit received an honor citation from the Israel Defense Forces Chief of the General Staff (צל"ש הרמטכ"ל) for their fighting during Operation Breakwater.

== See also ==
- Israeli take-over and hostage rescue units:
  - Sayeret Matkal
  - Shayetet 13 (naval take-over)
  - LOTAR Eilat (reserves)
  - Metzada Unit (Israeli Prison Service)
- Israeli Special Forces:
  - Sayeret
- Israeli security forces:
  - Israel Border Police
    - Yamas (another Border Police special forces unit)
  - Israeli police
  - Israeli Defence Forces
  - Shin Bet
- Similar foreign counter terrorism units:
  - List of police tactical units
  - National Security Guard
