= 120 Squadron (Israel) =

Israeli Air Force squadron

120 Squadron IAF
- טייסת 120
- Logo of the Squadron
- Active: 1962 – present
- Country: Israel
- Allegiance: Israel Defense Forces
- Branch: Israeli Air Force
- Type: Heavy Aircraft Squadron
- Role: Multipurpose
- Garrison/HQ: Nevatim Airbase
- Nickname: Desert Giants
- Engagements: Six Day War; War of Attrition; 2026 Iran war

Aircraft flown
- Transport: Boeing 707 and IAI 1124N Westwind SeaScan

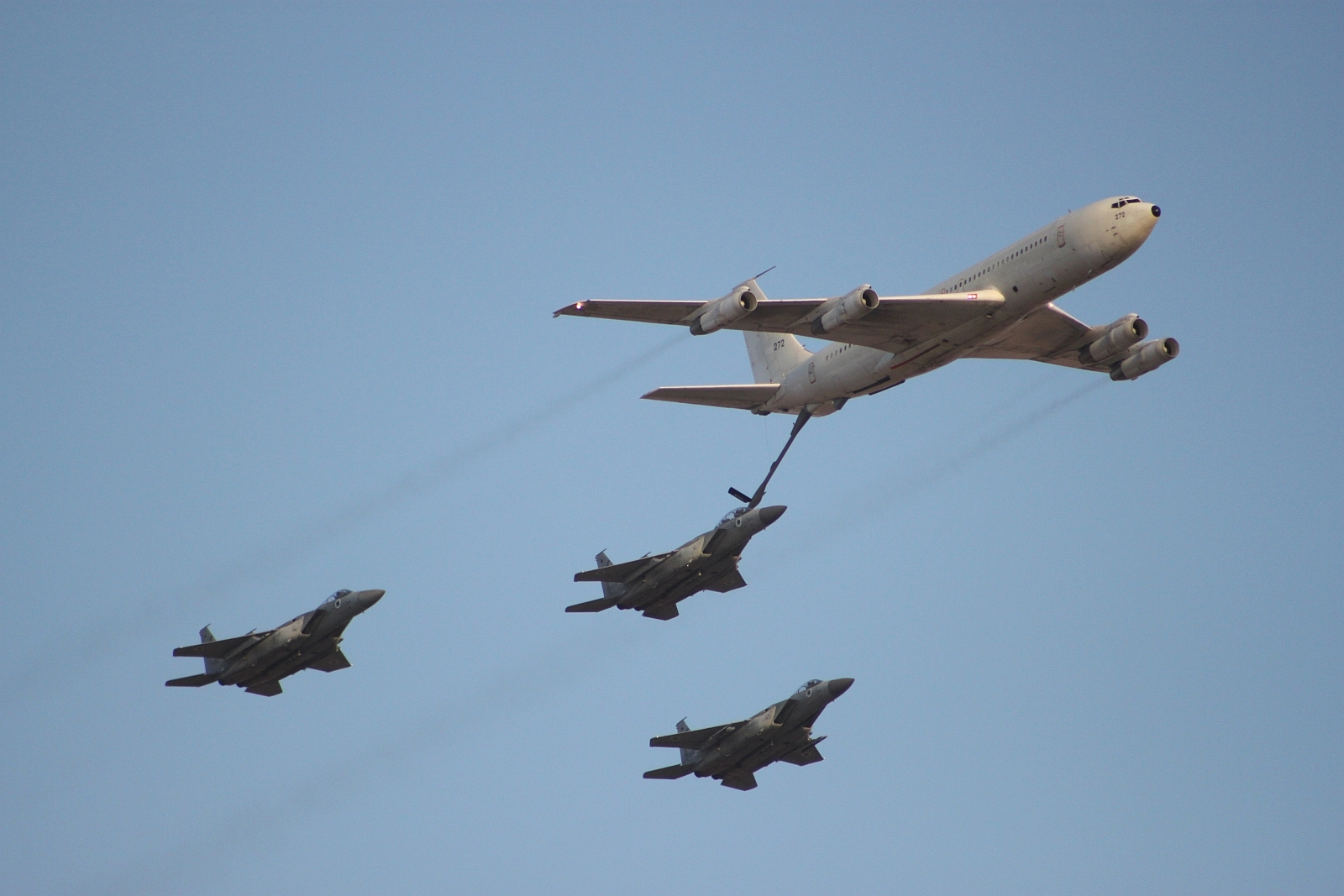
120 Squadron 707 refueling F-15s

120 Squadron is a squadron of the Israeli Air Force, also known as the Desert Giants (formerly International Squadron).

The squadron was originally formed in 1962 flying Douglas C-47 Dakotas. It now flies Boeing 707 and IAI 1124N Westwind SeaScan aircraft from Nevatim Airbase.

An undisclosed number (sources suggest seven) of converted Boeing 707 (the 707 Re’em) aircraft with flying booms operate as part of the squadron. Israel's fleet are former civilian aircraft adapted for military uses such as aerial refueling of combat aircraft and transport. Able to carry 20 extra fuel tanks while modified for aerial refueling, the Re’ems can be adapted to carry passengers as well as cargo such as military equipment and ammunition. Following the outbreak of the COVID-19 pandemic in 2020, the planes have also been used to carry medical equipment.

The Jerusalem Post wrote in September 2020 that the squadron will receive Boeing KC-46 Pegasus aerial refueling aircraft. Six months earlier, on 3 March 2020, The State Department had approved the Foreign Military Sale to Israel of eight KC-46s and related equipment for a cost of $2.4 billion.

== History ==
The squadron participated in the Six Day War in transport missions, parachuting (including dropping supplies) and communication relay. The squadron engaged in these missions and other missions such as electronic warfare also during the War of Attrition. On September 17, 1971, a Stratocruiser plane that was on an aerial photography mission over the Sinai Peninsula was shot down by an SA-2 surface-to-air missile. Seven of the eight crew members were killed.

In 1971, the squadron received the first two Lockheed C-130 Hercules aircraft to arrive in Israel. A year later, on September 14, 1972, the planes participated in the transfer of 12 wild asses from Ethiopia to Israel. The mission was initiated by Major General (reservists) Avraham Yaffe, then director of the Nature Reserves Authority. The planes landed in a makeshift field in Ethiopia to pick up the asses, which were transferred to the Chai Bar Yotbata wildlife reserve.

On May 24 and 25, 1991, the squadron's planes participated in Operation Solomon, during which approximately 14,500 Jews were brought to Israel. Six Ram planes of the squadron participated in the operation, and each of them made two rounds, in which the planes brought about 5,600 immigrants to Israel. In April and May 1994, Ram planes flew to Rwanda, in six sorties, medical aid and food for refugees who survived the Rwandan genocide committed by members of the Hutu tribe against the Tutsi tribe. Following the attack on the Jewish Community House in Argentina on July 18, 1994, a Ram plane flew a large load of aid equipment, with an evacuation and rescue team. On July 25, 1995, a Ram plane flew a lot of medical equipment to help the Muslim refugees in Bosnia following the Bosnian war. This expedition was in collaboration with the Royal Jordanian Air Force.

Following the outbreak of the COVID-19 pandemic in 2020, the planes have also been used to carry medical equipment.
