= Special forces of Israel =

Units of the Israel Defense Forces

Special forces units in the Israel Defense Forces (IDF) encompass a broad definition of specialist units. Such units are usually a regiment or a battalion in strength.

Sayeret (Hebrew: סיירת, pl.: sayarot), or reconnaissance units in the IDF nomenclature, specialize in intelligence gathering and surveillance. In practice, these units specialize in commando and other special forces roles, in addition to reconnaissance (the degree of specialization varies by units and current needs).

Mista'arvim (Hebrew: מסתערבים, lit. Arabized; Arabic: مستعربين, Musta'arabin), also spelled as mistaravim, are counter-terrorism units whose members are specifically trained to operate undercover, in enemy territory, in order to assassinate or capture wanted targets.

== History ==
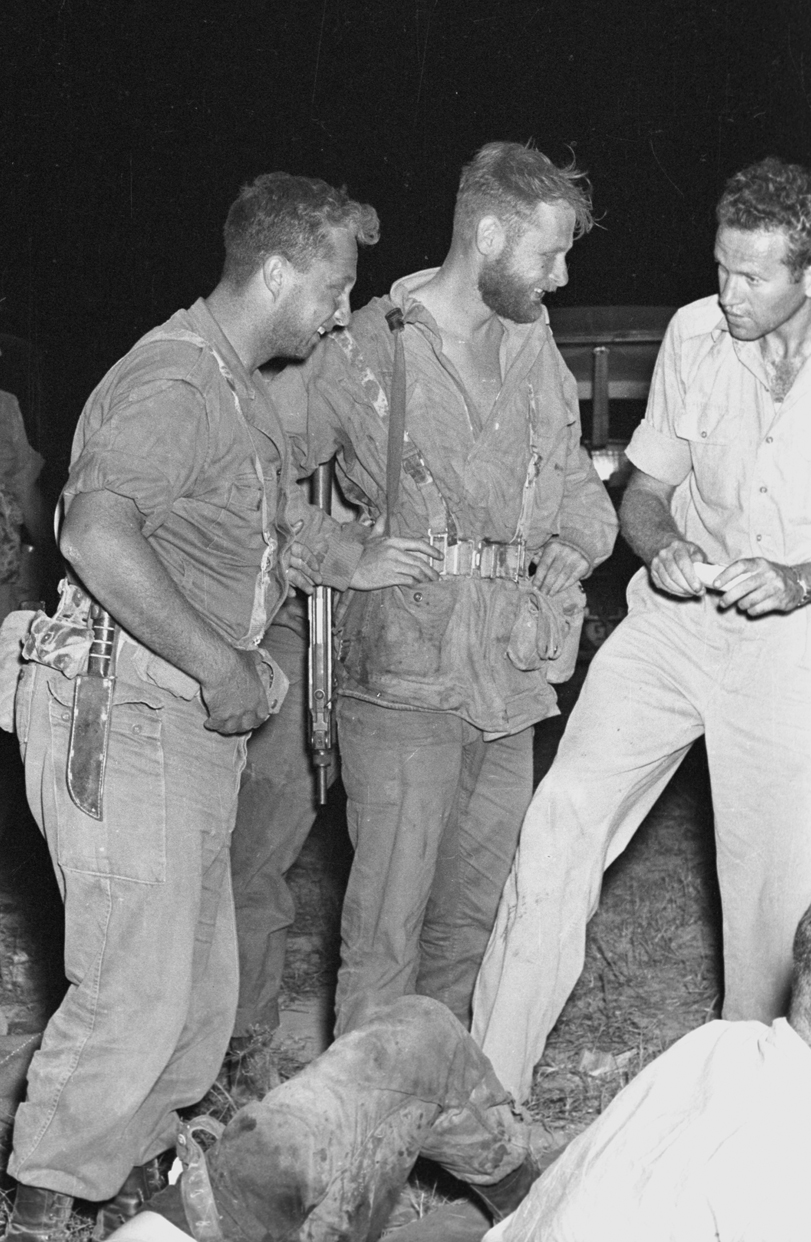
Ariel Sharon (left), and Aharon Davidi (center), before a reprisal operation, 1955.

=== Pre-state ===
Prior to the establishment of the State of Israel, some Jews of the Yishuv, or Jewish community of Mandatory Palestine, obtained experience as commandos during World War II. In 1941, the Haganah, the main Jewish militia and ancestor of the Israel Defense Forces, established the Palmach as an elite strike force with British assistance due to the Axis advance threatening Palestine. After the threat subsided, the British attempted to disarm the Palmach, which subsequently went underground. It subsequently engaged in sabotage operations against the British authorities to enable Jewish immigration and fought for Israeli independence against the Arabs. The Palmach formed a naval commando arm, the Palyam. In addition, some Jews of the Yishuv who enlisted in the British military during World War II served in commando units. Jews from Palestine served as commandos in the Special Interrogation Group and No. 51 Commando in addition to other units during the war.

=== Unit 101 ===
Commando Unit 101, the founding Israeli special forces unit, was established and commanded by Ariel Sharon on orders from Prime Minister David Ben-Gurion in August 1953. They were armed with non-standard weapons and tasked with carrying out retribution operations across the state's borders – in particular, establishing small unit maneuvers, activation and tactical insertion and exit tactics.

Members of the unit were recruited only from agricultural Kibbutzim and Moshavim. Membership in the unit was by invitation only, and any new member had to be voted on by all existing members before they were accepted.

The unit was merged into the 890th Paratroopers Battalion during January 1954, on orders of General Dayan, Chief of Staff, because he wanted their experience and spirit to be spread among all infantry units of IDF starting with the paratroopers. They are considered to have had a significant influence on the development of subsequent Israeli special forces units.

=== Sayeret units today ===
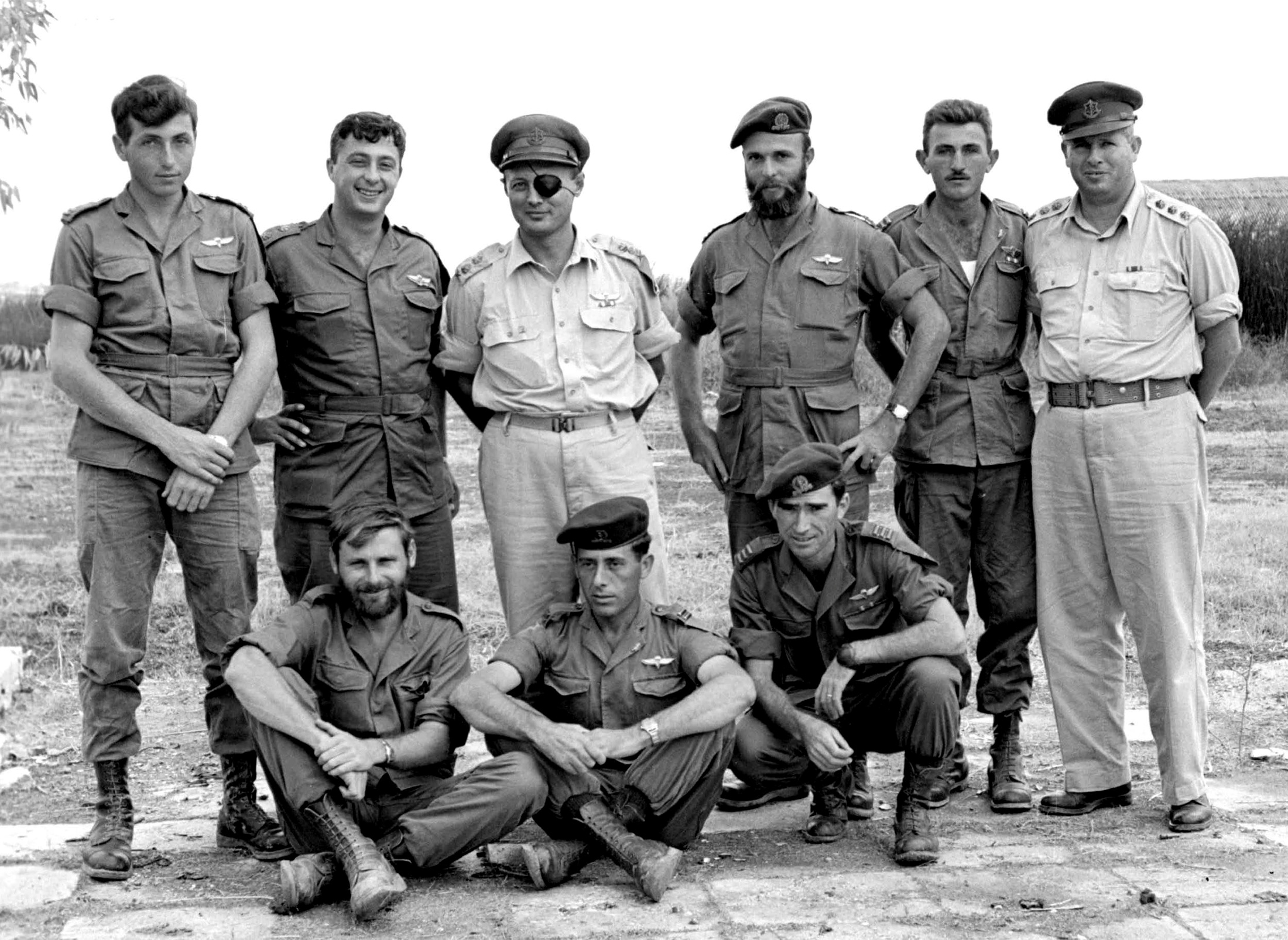
Israeli officers of the Paratrooper Battalion 890 in 1955 with Moshe Dayan (standing, third from the left). Ariel Sharon is standing, second from the left and commando Meir Har Zion is standing furthest left.

All combat brigades in the IDF include a unit with improved weaponry and training used for reconnaissance and special forces missions, trained to use advanced weapons and reconnaissance technology, as well as hand-to-hand combat. Historically the brigades used to only have one company-sized unit outfitted to do this job, known as Palsar (Hebrew contraction of: פלוגת-סיור, Plugat Siyur (singular) / Plugot Siyur (plural), "Reconnaissance Company"). Although the Palsar are mostly oriented at battlefield support (which is their raison d'être), many have participated in special operations over the years.

While in the past there were differences between the Siyur units, learning from past events and in order to improve and develop their forces, the IDF has consolidating them into larger units with many different capabilities: battalion-sized units called Gadsar (contraction of Gdud Siyur, "Reconnaissance battalion"). Each Gadsar is made up of three specialized Plugot (companies): demolitions and combat engineering (Plugat Habalah Handasit, or Palhan), reconnaissance (Plugat Siyur, Palsar) and anti-tank (Pluga Neged Tankim, or Palnat).

In late December 2015, several IDF special forces units were transferred to the Oz Brigade.

Other SF units or Sayaret are larger units, operating directly under the General Staff. They are tasked with the most sensitive missions but they also support other conventional and SF units, if needed. Those units are Sayeret Matkal, Shayetet 13 and Shaldag.

== IDF units ==
=== Reconnaissance units ===
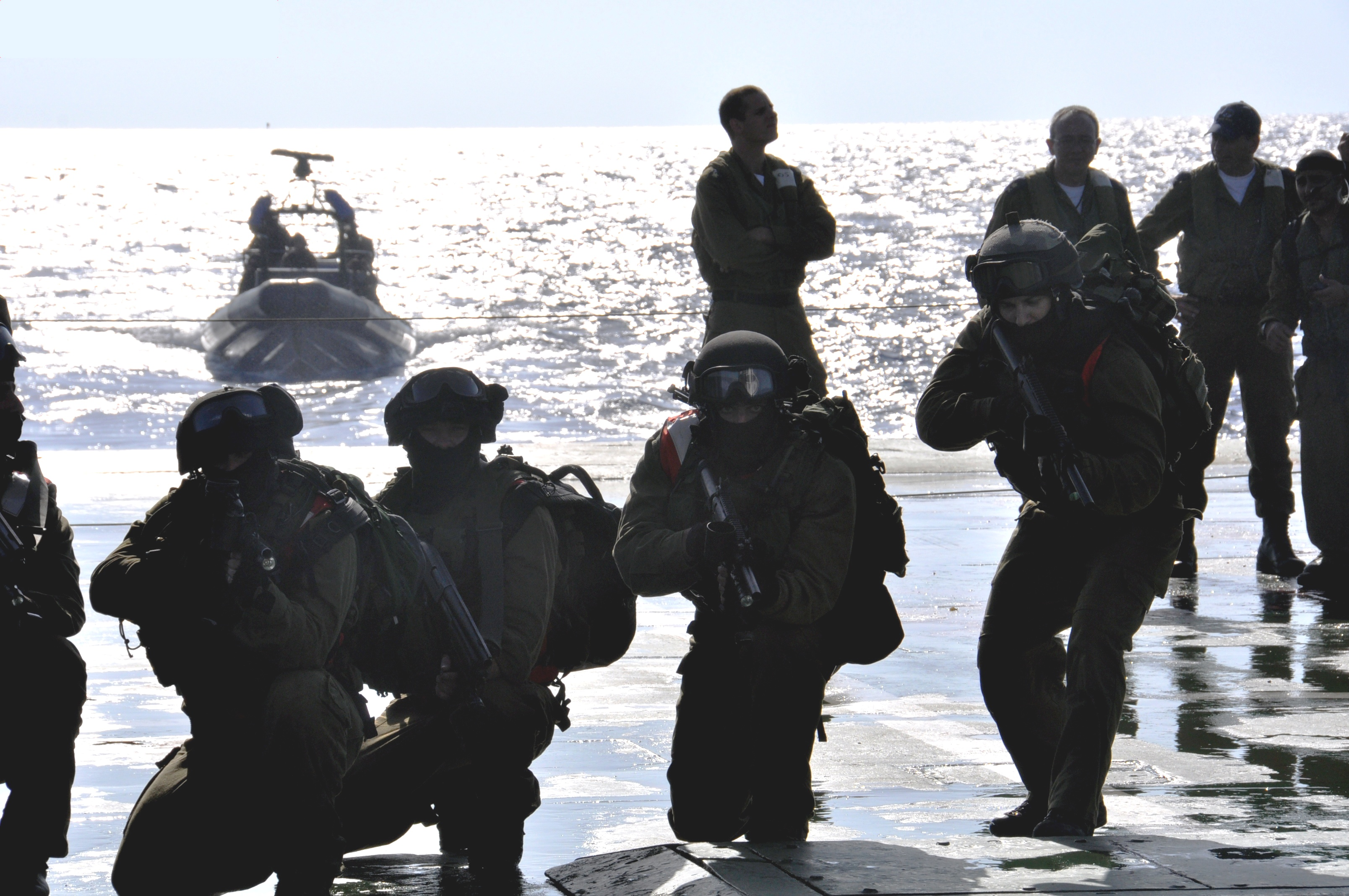
Shayetet 13 commandos prepare for an exercise aboard a warship

These are the most well-known reconnaissance units. Their operators are proficient in long range solo navigation, as opposed to other special forces units in the IDF where long range navigation is done with a minimum of 2 operators.

- General Staff Reconnaissance Unit 269 – Sayeret Matkal – the IDF's principal Sayeret unit, is used mainly to obtain strategic intelligence behind enemy lines and to perform hostage-rescue missions on foreign soil. It is directly subordinate to the Israeli Military Intelligence Directorate (AMAN).
- 13th Flotilla – Shayetet 13 – the naval commando unit. It is part of the Israeli Navy and tasked with maritime hostage-rescue missions. Founded in 1948 by former members of the Palyam, the naval branch of the Haganah.
- Unit 5101 – Shaldag – founded in 1974 by several former Sayeret Matkal veterans, it is the Israeli Air Force's commando unit, specializing in forward air control, aerial & special reconnaissance, and target designation outside of Israel's borders.

=== Infantry Corps ===
==== 89th "Oz" Brigade ====
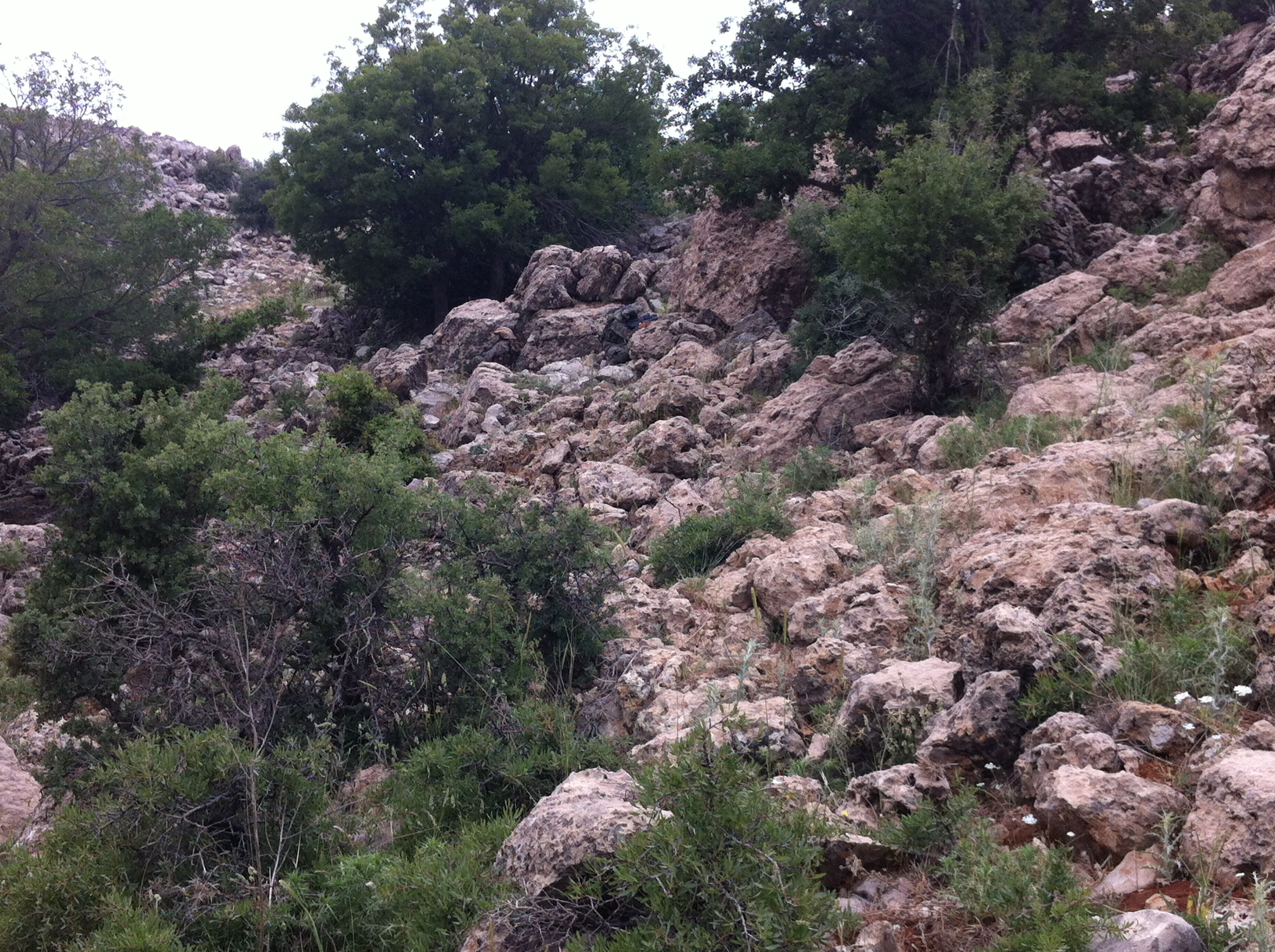
Egoz operators blend into the landscape of the Golan Heights.

- Unit 212 – Maglan – a commando unit which specializes in operating behind enemy lines.
- Unit 217 – Duvdevan – mistaravim unit.
- Unit 621 – Egoz – counter-guerrilla unit.

==== Infantry brigades ====
The regular five infantry brigades (Golani, Givati, Nahal, Kfir and the Paratroopers) operate their own Palsars, today joint with Pal'nat and Pal'han to form a "Gad'sar/G'dud Siur", or Reconnaissance Battalion. Each unit is subordinate to a specific brigade command, though they are not restricted to it.

- 93rd Reconnaissance Battalion – Kfir Brigade
- 631st Reconnaissance Battalion – Golani Brigade
- 846th Reconnaissance Battalion – Givati Brigade
- 934th Reconnaissance Battalion – Nahal Brigade
- 5135th Reconnaissance Battalion – Paratroopers Brigade

=== Armored Corps ===
- Palsar 7 – the 7th Armored Brigade reconnaissance unit.
- Palsar 188 – the 188th Armored Brigade reconnaissance unit.
- Palsar 401 – the 401st Brigade reconnaissance unit.

=== Artillery Corps ===
- 214th "Kela David" Special Brigade:
  - Unit 427 – Mietar – classified special reconnaissance unit.
  - Moran – a unit operating classified long range missiles.
- 215th "Fire" Brigade:
  - Unit 5353 "Sky Rider" (Rohev Shama'im) – a combat unit operating the Elbit Skylark drone.

=== Combat Engineering Corps ===
- Sayeret Yahalom – the engineering special forces unit, its missions range from EOD and bomb disposal to counter-mining warfare.

=== Combat Intelligence Collection Corps ===
- Combat Intelligence Collection Special Forces – tasked with intelligence-gathering, they operate either alone or in conjunction with other IDF units. They also provide target designation in wartime.

=== Air Force ===
- 7th Wing (Israel)
  - Unit 669 – combat search and rescue unit
  - Unit 5700 – Forward Air Field Tactical Unit
  - Shaldag Unit - air force special operations unit

=== Navy ===
- Shayetet 7 - the unit which operates Israel's submarines.
- Unit Snapir – force protection and harbor security unit.
- YALTAM – defensive divers unit tasked with mine countermeasures, explosive ordnance disposal and salvage and recovery. Not to be confused with Shayetet 13's own underwater unit.

=== Other units ===
- Refaim - A highly versatile commando unit that combines various fields of warfare, including infantry, engineering, anti-tank warfare, aerial warfare and intelligence collection.

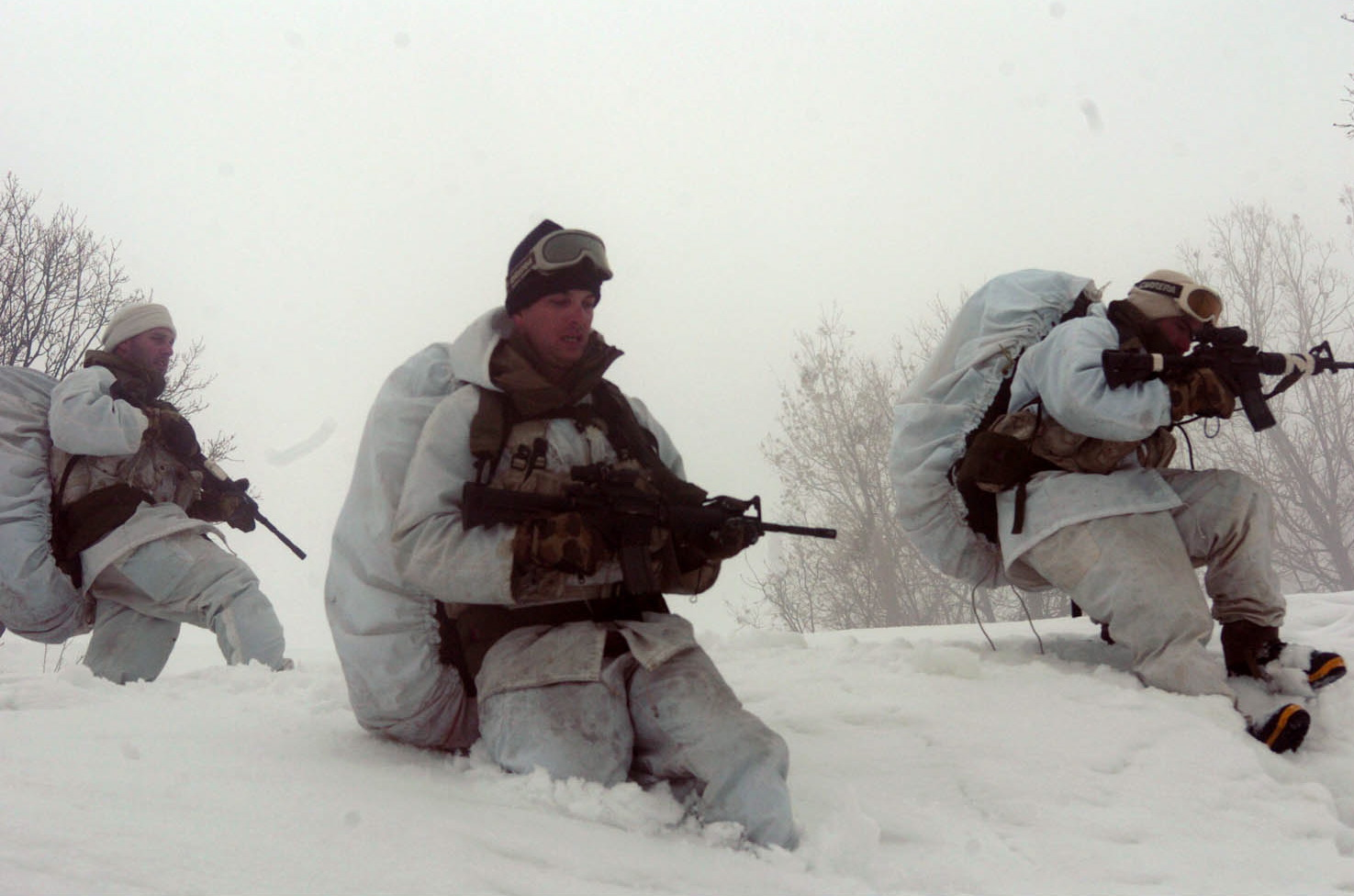
IDF Alpinist Unit dispatched to Mount Hermon

- Alpinist – IDF mountain-warfare unit operating in the Golan Heights; provides protection for IDF electronic listening posts on Mount Hermon and Mount Avital. This unit also provides alpine rescue services. (Northern Command).
- General Staff Security Unit – bodyguard unit of the Chief of General Staff and other top dignitaries.
- LOTAR – the IDF counter-terrorism school. Most IDF special forces units mentioned go through weeks of training led by LOTAR at the Mitkan Adam base, and as such the school includes an operational unit made up by the school's instructors.
- LOTAR Eilat – reserve force counter-terrorism/hostage-rescue unit based at the southern Israeli port city of Eilat. (Southern Command).
- Oketz – the IDF's special K-9 unit.
- School Of Operational Mobility (BALNAM) – Training of special forces and units from the entire IDF as tactical mobile personnel.

=== Disbanded units ===
- Unit 101 – the first Israeli special forces unit, commanded by Ariel Sharon. (Disbanded in 1954)
- Sayeret Shaked – IDF Southern Command special forces unit. (Disbanded in 1979)
- Sayeret Duchifat – Armored Corps anti-tank unit. (Disbanded in 1968)
- Samson Unit – Gaza Strip mista'arvim unit. (Disbanded in 1996)
- Sayeret Rimon – Desert warfare, Gaza Strip infiltration of terrorists and border infiltration. (Disbanded in 2018)

== Law enforcement ==
=== Border Police ===
- Yamam – a counter-terrorist unit specializing in hostage-rescue operations and offensive take-over raids against targets in civilian areas
- Yamas – special operations and mista'arvim unit directly subordinate to the Shin Bet.

=== Police ===
- Yasam – quick response and riot police unit.
- Gideonim – undercover and mistaravim unit.
- YAGAL – counter-smuggling unit.

=== Prison Service ===
- Metzada unit – quick response and intervention force and specializes in suppression of prisoner uprisings.
- Nahshon – intervention and conveyance unit; deals with searches, silencing disturbances, guarding IPS staff, etc.
- Dror – counter-narcotics unit

== See also ==
- Mista'arvim – Undercover counter-terrorism personnel/units specifically trained to assimilate among the local Arab population. They are commonly tasked with performing intelligence gathering, law enforcement, hostage rescue and counter-terrorism, and to use disguise and surprise as their main weapons.
- Mossad – Israel's covert intelligence and special operations agency abroad.
  - Kidon – a department within Mossad that is allegedly responsible for selective high-profile assassination.
- Aman – Israel's military intelligence agency.
- Shin Bet – Israel's internal security agency.
- Oz Brigade – the Ground Forces formation grouping some of the Israeli special forces units.
- Israel's Arab Warriors – a documentary on the Arab soldiers of the IDF.
