= 7th Wing (Israel) =

- כנף 7
- Logo of the Wing
- Active: 2022 – present
- Country: Israel
- Allegiance: Israel Defense Forces
- Branch: Israeli Air Force
- Type: Special Forces Wing
- Garrison/HQ: Palmachim Airbase
- Nickname: Special Forces Wing

Commanders
- Current commander: Lt. Col J
- Notable commanders: Omri Gonen

The 7th Wing is the special forces wing of the Israeli Air Force. It is composed of three combat units: Unit 669, Shaldag Unit, and Unit 5700. The wing's headquarters is based at the Palmachim Airbase.

== Roles ==
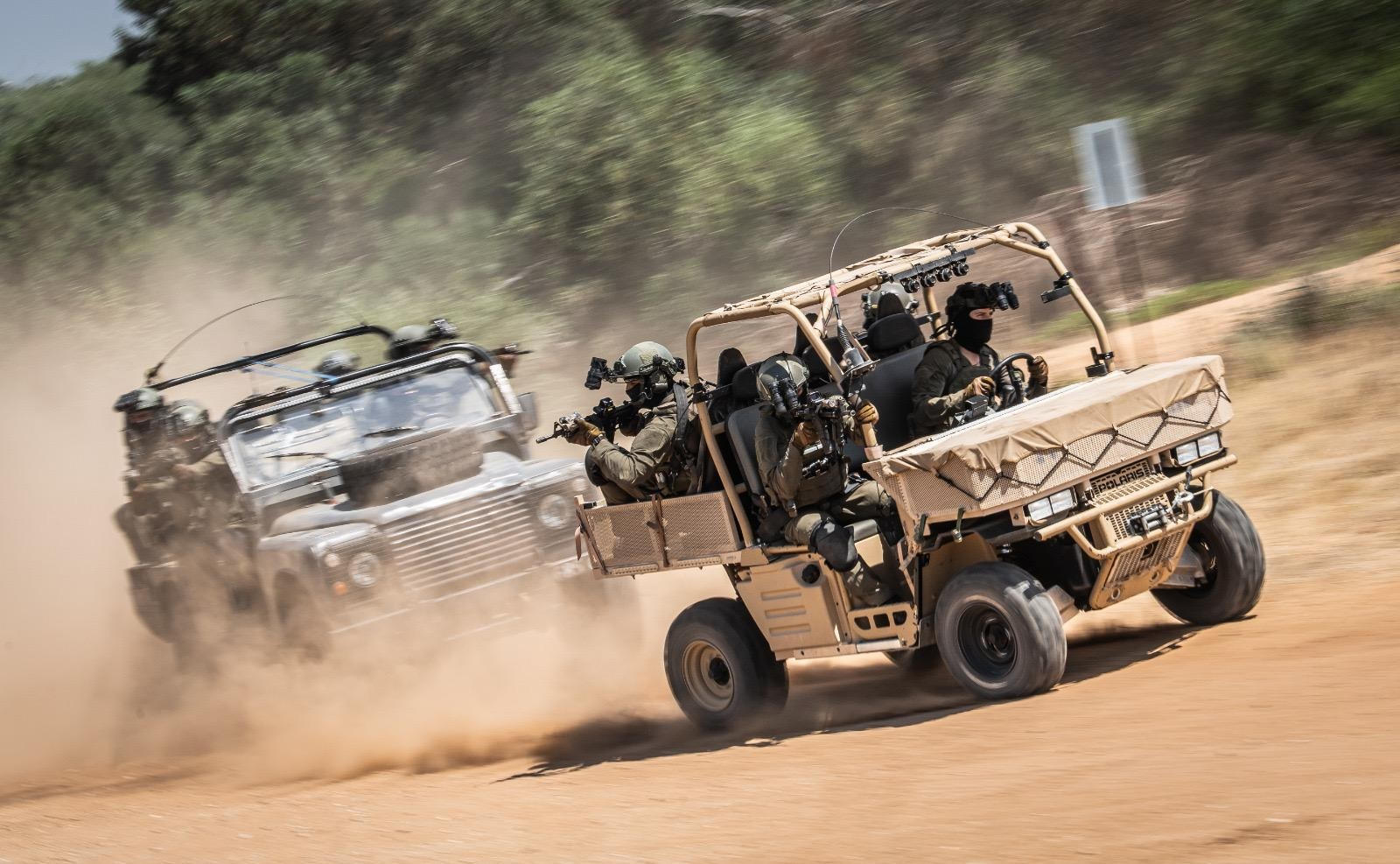
Wing fighters during training

The wing was established out of an operational need to deal with the Air Force's core challenge of having a special operative force for designated operations. The wing is a complementary component to the Air Force's activities through special operations in routine and emergency. The wing's main missions include:

- Special reconnaissance
- Tactical air control
- Airfield Assault Zone establishment
- Combat search and rescue
- Operation of forward airstrips and airfields

== Units ==
The wing currently has three operational units on three different bases:

- Unit 669 - Combat Search and Rescue Unit (on Tel Nof and Palmachim)
- Shaldag Unit - Air Commando Unit (on Palmachim)
- Unit 5700 - Forward Air Field Tactical Unit (on Nevatim)

== History ==
=== Establishment ===
Until the establishment of the Wing, the wing's units were subordinated to the various air force bases and the professional direction was the responsibility of the Special Air Forces Command. With the establishment of the wing in July 2020, the command of the Special Air Forces that operated at the Air Force Headquarters was abolished, and a SAF branch in the attack department and a SAF training section in an integrated training branch was established at the corps headquarters.

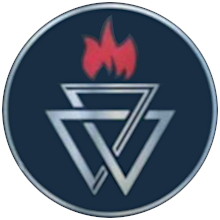
Logo of the Wing's joint training branch

=== October 7 Surprise Attack ===
Following the surprise attack on Israel on 7 October 2023, the Shaldag Unit was deployed to fight Hamas militants in the communities they had infiltrated. The unit's fighters were flown by helicopters to the rear of the terrorist units and fought in the Battle of Re'im Camp, the Battle of Kibbutz Be'eri, the Battle of Kibbutz Alumim, the Battle of Holit, and the Battle of Kfar Aza. During the battles, five of the Shaldag Unit fighters were killed. Similarly, the Unit 669 was the first to reach certain combat centers, the unit evacuated hundreds of wounded in operational cooperation with the circle of elite units in the IDF, especially the mobility unit.

=== Gaza war ===
The Shaldag Unit participated in the raid on Shifa Hospital and the exposure of Hamas's tunnel network beneath it, together with Yahalom fighters from the Combat Engineering Corps and Oketz Unit.

On 20 December 2023, Shaldag Unit along with Sayeret Matkal, Shayetet 13, the 401st Brigade, and Oketz fighters, completed the takeover of the "Senior Officials' Quarter" of Hamas in Palestine Square in the Rimal neighborhood in central Gaza City. The quarter served as the main governmental and security hub of Hamas. The complex includes an extensive tunnel network connecting the offices of senior officials, safe houses, offices, and residences of the military wing and the military leadership of Hamas in the Gaza Strip. On February, together with other special forces, the Unit 669 took a major part in Operation Golden Hand to free two hostages, Fernando Marman and Luis Har, who were held in Rafah. The force and the abductees from the scene of the operation were taken by Unit 669 to the evacuation helicopter, which evacuated the abductees to the Sheba Medical Center.

== Sources & References ==
- "A video on the YouTube channel of the Israeli Air Force".
- "סערה על הקרקע". Israeli Air Force website.
