= Unit 5700 =

Israeli Air Force Special Unit

- יחידת ההנחתה הקדמית
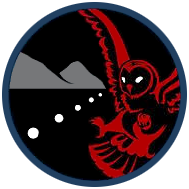
- Unit logo
- Active: December 10, 1973 – present
- Country: Israel
- Branch: Israeli Air Force
- Type: Special Operations Force
- Role: Airfield Assault Zone establishment, special reconnaissance, Air traffic control, fire support
- Part of: Israeli Air Force
- Garrison/HQ: Nevatim Airbase
- Nickname: YAHAK
- Engagements: Yom Kippur War; Operation Litani; 1982 Lebanon War; Operation Moshe; Gaza war

Insignia
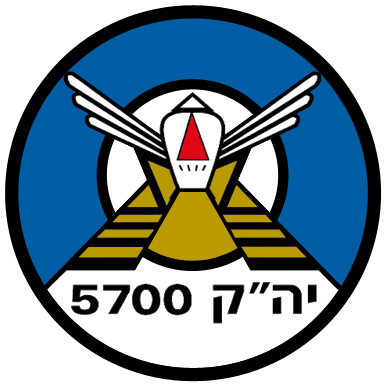
- Former Insignia

Unit 5700 also known as Forward Air Field Tactical Unit (Hebrew acronym YAHAK) is a special unit of the Israeli Air Force concerned with establishing and operating temporary forward landing bases for transport, reinforcement, logistics, and other purposes. Along with Shaldag Unit and Unit 669, it constitutes the special forces wing of Israeli Air Force.

== Roles ==
The mission of the unit is to locate and operate forward airfields and airstrips usable for aircraft, which are not permanent airfields of the Israeli Air Force.

The role is carried out by a "frontal assault lander and includes paratroopers, examining the suitability of the region for the task, marking them and establishing temporary airstrip. The inspection of the intended runways is carried out by a "soil examiner" who is also the professional authority that approves the landing on the spot.The work is carried out with the transport planes and various aircraft and it requires knowledge of communication and flight control and infantry, navigation and mobility skills.

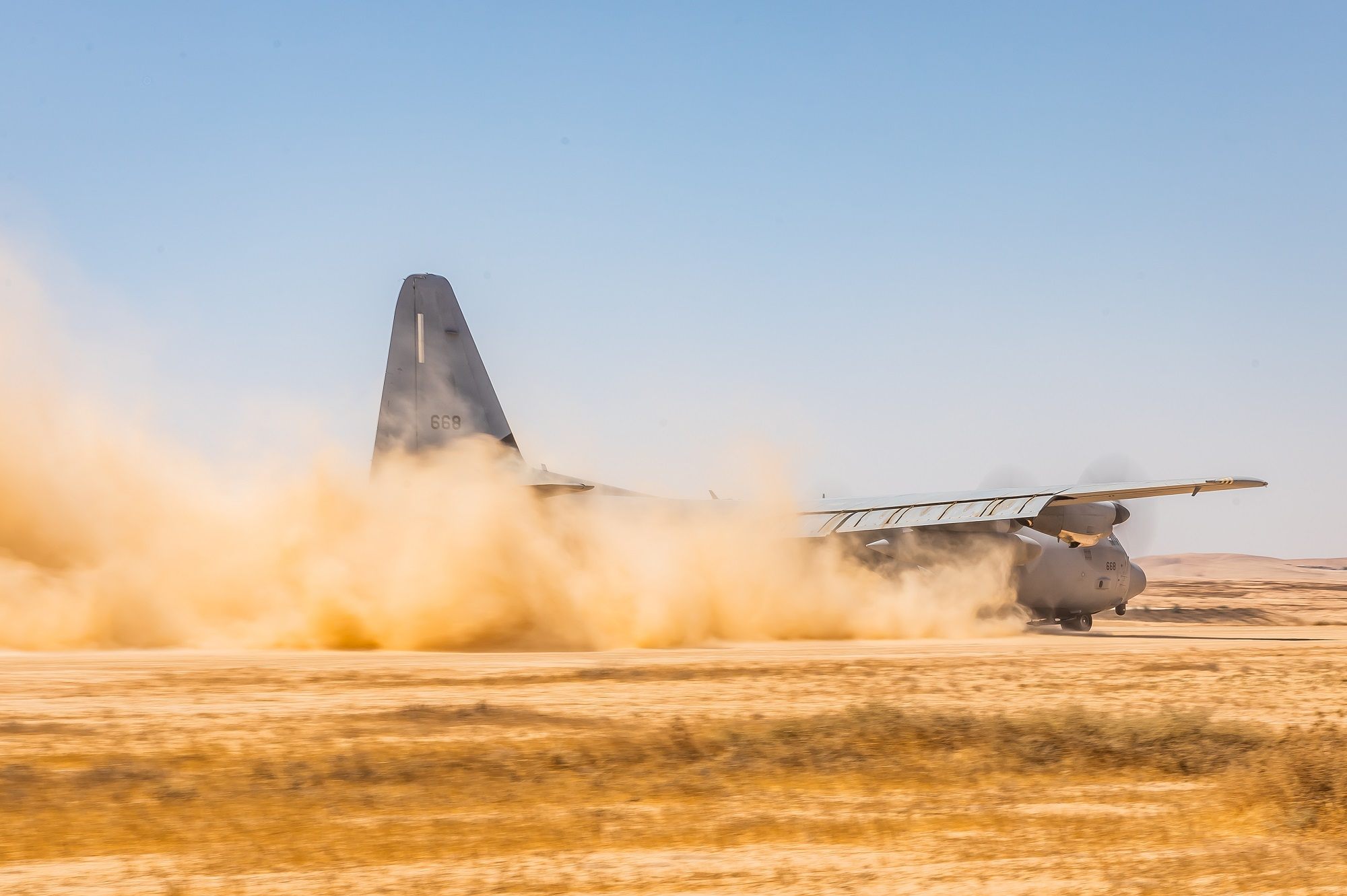
A transport plane lands at an airstrip constructed by unit 5700 in April 2021

It also plays to role in the security of Airforce installations. The role of the unit is similar to that of United States Air Force Combat Control Team.

== History ==
The unit was established on December 10, 1973, at the Lod Airbase . Avraham Shavit was the first to establish the unit then called as the "route branch". In the Yom Kippur War, the unit participated under the command of Amos Jordan. In 1978 she participated in Operation Litani. In the 1982 Lebanon War, the unit was deployed at the Beirut International Airport for Air Force operations, and at Ansar, Marjayoun and Damour. In Operation Moshe, the unit's soldiers helped in the evacuation of Ethiopian Jews. The unit also transported humanitarian aid to Rwanda and took part in military exercises in Mexico. In 2009, the unit was deployed at the Nevatim Airbase. In 2009, the unit joined the Special Air Forces Command of Israeli Air Force. In 2022, it was transferred to Special Air Forces Wing. The unit also participated in the Gaza war. In 2024, female personnel were integrated into the unit for the first time.

== Selection & Training ==
- Prerequisites : medical profile 82 or higher, KBA 53 or higher, DPR 50 or higher. The screening includes computerized tests, medical examinations, a security investigation and an interview.
- Military training - Same training as that given to Unit 669 and Shaldag Unit special operatives.
- Recruitment - a limited, one-year recruitment cycle, held at the end of November.

== Sources & References ==
- Eran Belcher. "נחיתה רכה". Israeli Air Force website.
- "YHK (יחידת נחיתה קדימה)". Israeli Air Force website.
- "בעיר חיל האוויר, על קרקע בטוחה". Israeli Air Force website.
- "At every point on the globe: the air fighters who extend the Israeli arm". Walla (in Hebrew). November 30, 2017.
- Maya Polak (December 3, 2019). "היחיד שבנה רצועת נחיתה באיראן לפני תקיפה ישראלית". Makor Rishon (in Hebrew).
- Hanan Greenwood (October 29, 2018). "מסווג: היחידה שמנחת מטוסים בשטח האויב". Israel Hayom.
- Zohar Neiger (December 1, 2021). "שדה תעופה נייד,". Israeli Air Force website.
- "היחידה שמנחיתה לוחמים בלב הקרב". IDF website. December 18, 2023.
- Love Turgeman (April 11, 2023). "איך נוחתים בעפר". Israeli Air Force website.
