= Combat search and rescue =

Military personnel recovery from battlefield and enemy occupied areas

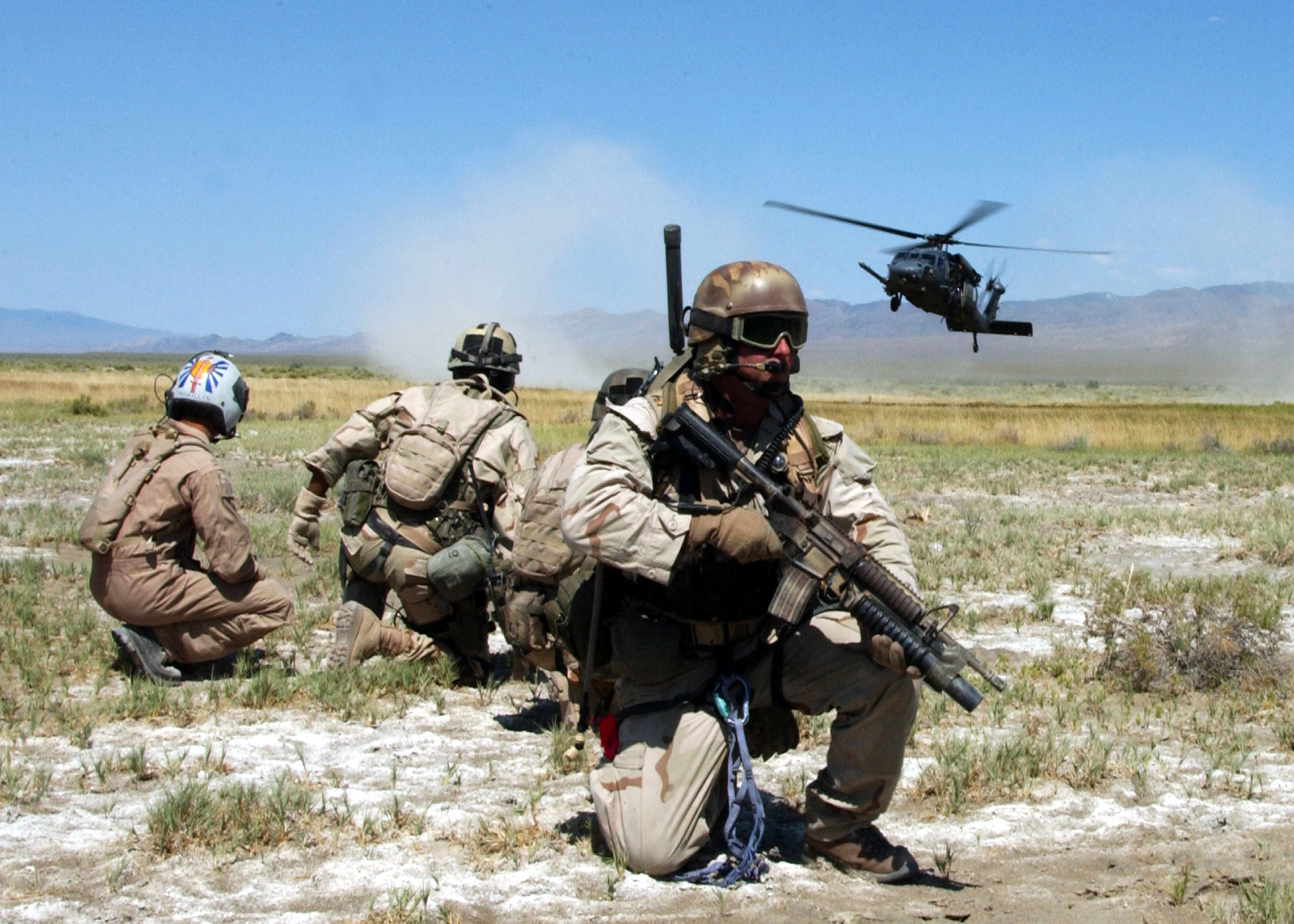
An HH-60G Pave Hawk helicopter comes in for a landing during a combat rescue training exercise. - 13 July 2005

Combat search and rescue (CSAR) are search and rescue operations that are carried out during war, within or near combat zones.

A CSAR mission may be carried out by a task force of helicopters, ground-attack aircraft, aerial refueling tankers and an airborne command post. The USAF HC-130, introduced in 1965, has served in the latter two roles.

== History ==
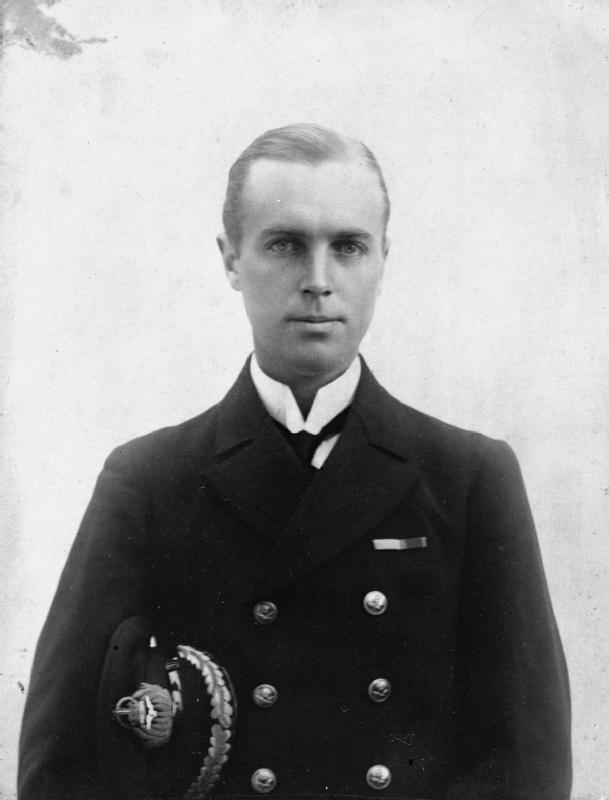
Richard Bell-Davies conducted the first combat S&R mission in his aircraft during the First World War.

The First World War was the background for the development of early combat search and rescue doctrine, especially in the more fluid theaters of war in the Balkans and the Middle East.

In the opening fluid stages of the First World War the Royal Navy Air Service Armoured Car Section was formed with armed and armoured touring cars to find and pick up aircrew who had been forced down. When trench warfare made this impossible, the cars were transferred to other theatres, most notably the Middle East.

In 1915, during the First World War, Squadron Commander Richard Bell-Davies of the British Royal Naval Air Service performed the first combat search and rescue by aircraft in history. He used his single-seat aeroplane to rescue his wingman who had been shot down in Bulgaria. His Victoria Cross citation included "Squadron-Commander Davies descended at a safe distance from the burning machine, took up Sub-Lieutenant Smylie, in spite of the near approach of a party of the enemy, and returned to the aerodrome, a feat of airmanship that can seldom have been equalled for skill and gallantry." Like the search and rescue efforts of the future, Davies' action sprang from the fervent desire to keep a compatriot from capture or death at the hands of the enemy.

During the Mesopotamian campaign, British and other Commonwealth forces began to use similar tactics on a larger scale. Shot down aviators in hostile Bedouin territory were often located by search parties in the air and rescued.

Other nations also contributed to the development of modern-day CSAR. During World War II, the Luftwaffe (Seenotdienst organization) operated armed camouflaged air-sea rescue aircraft.

In the First Indochina War, French physician, pilot and parachutist Valérie André pioneered MEDEVAC tactics, a precursor to what we know as CSAR today, by flying helicopters into combat zones to retrieve or sometimes treat, injured soldiers.

In August 1943, a US wing flight surgeon, Lt. Col. Don Flickinger, and two combat surgical technicians, Sgt. Richard S. Passey and Cpl. William G. MacKenzie, parachuted from search planes in the Naga area of Burma to assist and care for the injured. At the same time, a ground team was sent to their location and all twenty walked to safety.

Although parachute rescues were not officially authorized at the time, this is considered by PJs to be the birth of United States Air Force Pararescue. Eric Sevareid said of his rescuers: "Gallant is a precious word: they deserve it". A few short months later, Capt. Porter was killed on a rescue mission when his B-25 was shot down.

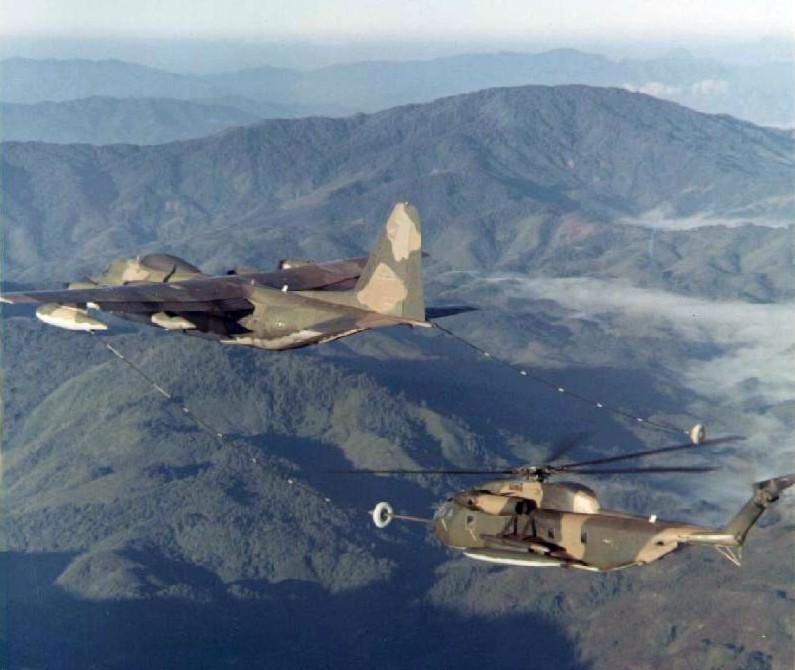
A Sikorsky HH-53B refueling during the Vietnam War.

During the Vietnam War the costly rescue of Bat 21 led the US military to find a new approach to high-threat search and rescue. They recognized that if a SAR mission was predestined to fail, it should not be attempted and other options such as special operations, diversionary tactics and other creative approaches tailored to the situation had to be considered. Recognizing the need for an aircraft that could deliver better close air support, the US Air Force introduced the A-7 Corsair, originally a carrier-based Navy light attack aircraft, to replace the Air Force's A-1 Skyraiders, an aircraft that also was originally a carrier-based naval attack bomber.

As a result of the Vietnam CSAR experience, the US military also improved the night capability of helicopters and area denial munitions.

During the Vietnam War, U.S. SAR forces saved 3,883 lives at the cost of 71 rescuers and 45 aircraft.

== Notable missions ==
=== World War I ===
On 21 April 1917, Captain Richard Williams of the Australian Flying Corps landed behind enemy lines to rescue a downed comrade during World War I.

=== Vietnam War ===
In 1972, Lieutenant Colonel Iceal Hambleton, a navigator/electronic warfare officer with a background in ballistic missile technology and missile countermeasures in the US Air Force, was the sole survivor of an EB-66 shot down during the Easter Offensive. He eluded capture by North Vietnamese forces until his rescue, eleven-and-a-half days later. During the rescue operation, five US military aircraft supporting the CSAR effort were shot down, eleven US servicemen were killed, and two men were captured. The rescue operation was the "largest, longest, and most complex search-and-rescue" operation during the entire Vietnam War. It has been the subject of two books and the largely fictionalized film Bat*21.

=== Iran war (2026) ===
On 3 April 2026, a USAF F-15E was shot down by Iranian forces. Both Pilot and Combat Systems Operator (CSO) ejected inside Iranian territory and a large-scale search operation was undertaken, utilizing MC-130J, Black Hawk, Pave Hawk and Apache aircraft. The pilot was located & rescued within a few hours. It took roughly two days to locate & rescue the Combat Systems Officer. Hundreds of US special operations forces personnel were involved and a makeshift airstrip was established inside Iranian territory to support CSAR operations. Upon extraction, two MC-130J multi-engine transport aircraft and four MH-6 light helicopters were destroyed by US forces to prevent them being seized by the IRGC. No casualties occurred in the rescue for U.S. troops.

=== Others ===
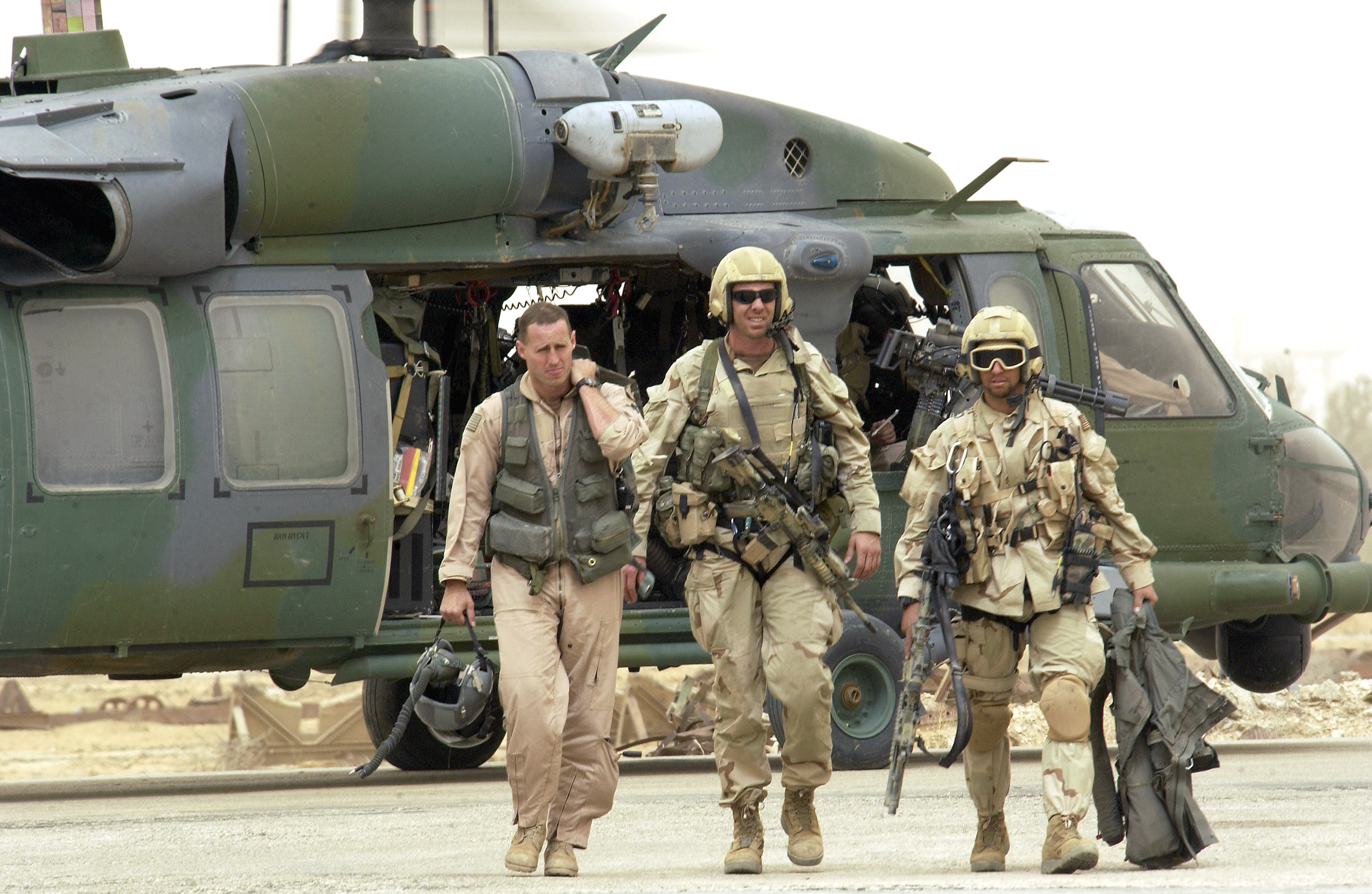
Pararescuemen return with a downed pilot from a successful rescue mission in southern Iraq, 2003

The United States Air Force (USAF) 24th Special Tactics Squadron was involved in the 1993 Battle of Mogadishu. Timothy Wilkinson, a Pararescueman, was awarded the Air Force Cross for his heroic actions during the battle.

Air Force pararescue personnel (PJs) have been awarded one United States Air Force Medal of Honor and 12 Air Force Crosses since the Southeast Asia conflict.

During the opening moments of Operation Desert Storm, an MH-53 Pave Low crew from the 20th Special Operations Squadron recovered an F-14 Tomcat pilot who was shot down over Iraq.

On June 2, 1995, a USAF F-16C was shot down by a Bosnian Serb Army SA-6 surface-to-air missile near Mrkonjić Grad, Bosnia and Herzegovina. The American pilot, Scott O'Grady, ejected safely and was rescued six days later.

In 1999, members of United States Air Force Pararescue along with Air Force Special Operations recovery aircraft successfully rescued the pilot of an F-117 stealth attack aircraft (see 1999 F-117A shootdown) and the pilot (David L. Goldfein) of an F-16 fighter aircraft. Both of the aircraft were shot down over Yugoslavia while on a NATO-led mission.

== See also ==
- Joint Personnel Recovery Agency
- United States Air Force Pararescue
- Special warfare combatant-craft crewmen

International:

- Air Parachute Commando No. 10, France
- Kommando Spezialkräfte, German army
- Kampfretter, German airforce
- 17th Raiders Wing, Italy
- Israel Air Force Unit 669 and Unit 5101
- Nigerian Air Force#Special Operations
- Combat Search and Rescue (Turkish Armed Forces)
- Combat Search and Rescue Detachment (Romania)
- Garud Commando Force, India
- Kopasgat, Indonesia
- Para-SAR, Brazil
- Special Task Force (Sri Lanka)
- 7 Medical Battalion Group, South Africa
- Central Readiness Regiment, Japan, sent to Afghanistan to evacuate Japanese civilians during the fall of Kabul
- 2026 U.S. pilot rescue operation in Iran
