= Muki Betser =

Israel Defense Forces colonel (born 1945)

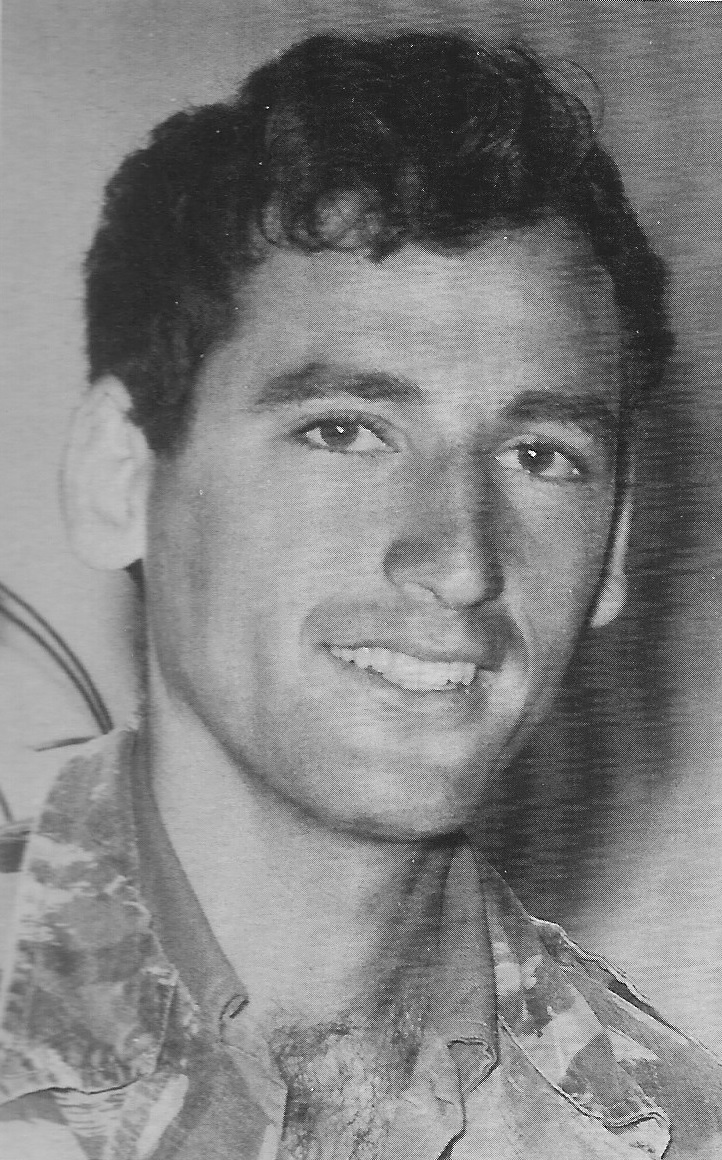
Betser in 1968

Moshe "Muki" Betser (Hebrew: משה "מוקי" בצר; born 14 October 1945) is a retired Israel Defense Forces colonel who served from 1964 to 1986. Considered "one of Israel’s legendary commandoes", while Betser was deputy commander of Sayeret Matkal he helped plan and was the commander of the break-in teams during Israel's Operation Entebbe. He was also involved in the 1973 Israeli raid on Lebanon and the failed hostage rescue operation during the Ma'alot massacre.

The Shaldag Unit was founded in 1974, in the aftermath of the Yom Kippur War, by Betser, who brought several Matkal veterans with him. Initially operating as a Sayeret Matkal reserve company, it was eventually transferred to the IAF.

== Early life ==
Muki Betser was born in 1945 in his grandparents' house in moshav Nahalal. They were among the seven people (along with Moshe Dayan's father) who established Israel's first kibbutz, Degania. His mother, Sarah Hurvitz, was born and raised in Tel Aviv; her family lived in the area for five generations. His father, Nahman Betser, was born in the second kibbutz in Israel, Merhavia, that his grandparents also helped establish. Betser lived in Nahalal until he was four, then moved with his family to Haifa, where his father worked as a major construction contractor. His family's return to the Jezreel Valley to live in Beit She'arim when he was eight, was one of the "happiest days" of his life.

== Private life ==
Betser married in February 1967. They lived in the house that his wife Nurit inherited in Nahalal, the childhood home of Moshe Dayan, only a few houses away from where Betser was born. They had one son, Saul, who followed Betser into "The Unit". Nurit died when she was 29. Betser remarried in 1982, and had two daughters, Tamar and Shani.

Betser established a pre-military program in the kibbutz Maagan Michael, considered one of the best in Israel.
