= Shaldag Unit =

Unit 5101 "Shaldag"
- יחידת שלדג
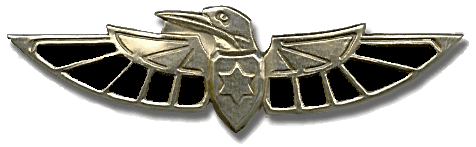
- The Shaldag insignia
- Active: 1974–present
- Country: Israel
- Branch: Israeli Air Force
- Type: Sayeret
- Part of: 7th Special Air Forces Wing
- Garrison/HQ: Palmachim Airbase
- Mottos: זן נדיר, ציפור משונה (Rare kind, strange bird.)
- Engagements: Operation Litani; 1982 Lebanon War; South Lebanon conflict First Intifada; Second Intifada; Operation Orchard; 2014 Gaza War; Gaza war 2024 Israeli invasion of Syria

Insignia
- Emblem Unit

Unit 5101, also known as Shaldag (Hebrew: שלדג, Kingfisher), is one of the sayeret units of Israeli Air Force. It is a part of the 7th Wing and is based in the Palmachim Airbase. The unit is led by an officer with the rank of lieutenant colonel.

It specializes in clandestine operation, combat search and rescue, commando style raids, hostage rescue, irregular warfare, long-range penetration, military intelligence operations, special operations, and special reconnaissance within enemy territory.

== History ==
Shaldag was founded in 1974, in the aftermath of the Yom Kippur War, by Muki Betser, a Sayeret Matkal veteran who brought several Matkal veterans with him. Initially operating as a Sayeret Matkal reserve company, it was eventually transferred to the IAF.

Shaldag's mission is to deploy undetected into combat and hostile environments to conduct special reconnaissance, establish assault zones or airfields, while simultaneously conducting air traffic control and commando actions. Shaldag operates from Palmachim Airbase. Its soldiers carry M16 or M4A1 assault rifles fitted with the M203 grenade launcher. For special missions, they carry Glock 17 and 19 9×19mm series pistols and Mauser SR 82/66 sniper rifles.

== Recruitment and training ==
To be considered for service in the unit, a candidate must have a medical profile between 82-97. Candidates who pass the initial commando units day selection, undergo a five-day commando selection trial (which also tests candidates for Sayeret Matkal and Unit 669). Candidates who are accepted are enlisted in the November draft. Medics in the unit are drafted in August.

Shaldag Unit operators undergo the longest training phase of any unit in the IDF, lasting 22 months, and training has a heavy emphasis on navigation. Training consists of phases, with navigation exercises between each phase, designed to provide extensive navigation experience while alleviating intense physical tension from long forced marches with heavy weights. The phases are:

- Six months of basic and advanced infantry training.
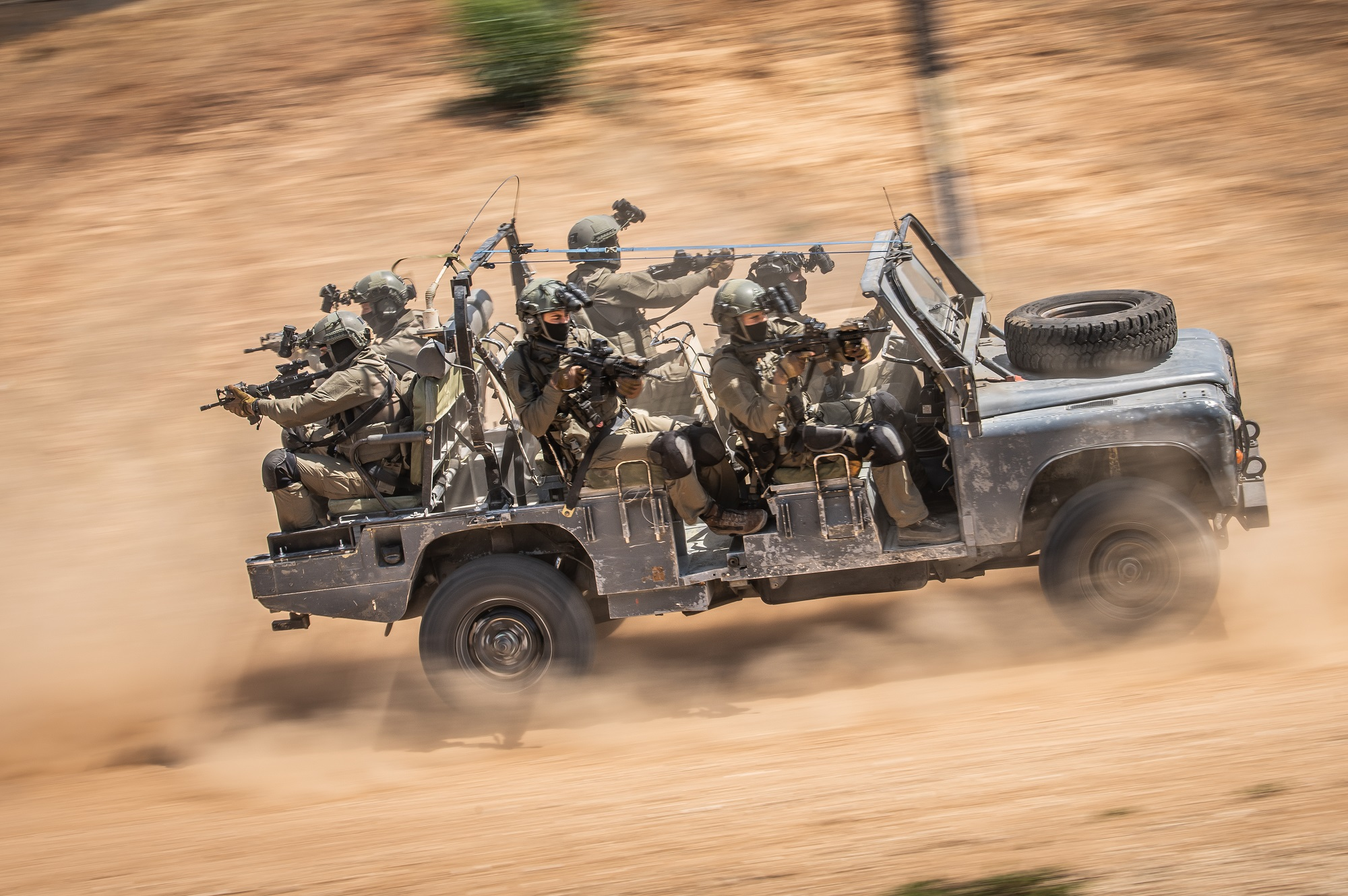
- Shaldag Unit exercise
  Parachuting course at the IDF's parachuting school.
- Counter-terrorism course at the IDF's counter-terrorism school.
- All-weather and all-terrain navigation exercises.
- Air-to-ground cooperation and airborne operations.
- Intelligence gathering, communication, and reconnaissance training.
- Specialized training for those with designated roles such as medics and snipers.
- Two-week course in enduring enemy captivity, including being subjected to a surprise mock kidnapping, held in prison-like conditions, and subjected to threats, interrogation, physical violence, and humiliation.

At the end of training, Shaldag operators receive a book about David Stirling, founder of the British Special Air Service, and the SAS's actions in North Africa during World War II. Unit members who finish their training are required to sign on for 24 months of career services, in addition to their mandatory service of 2 years and 8 months.

== Unit pin and emblem ==
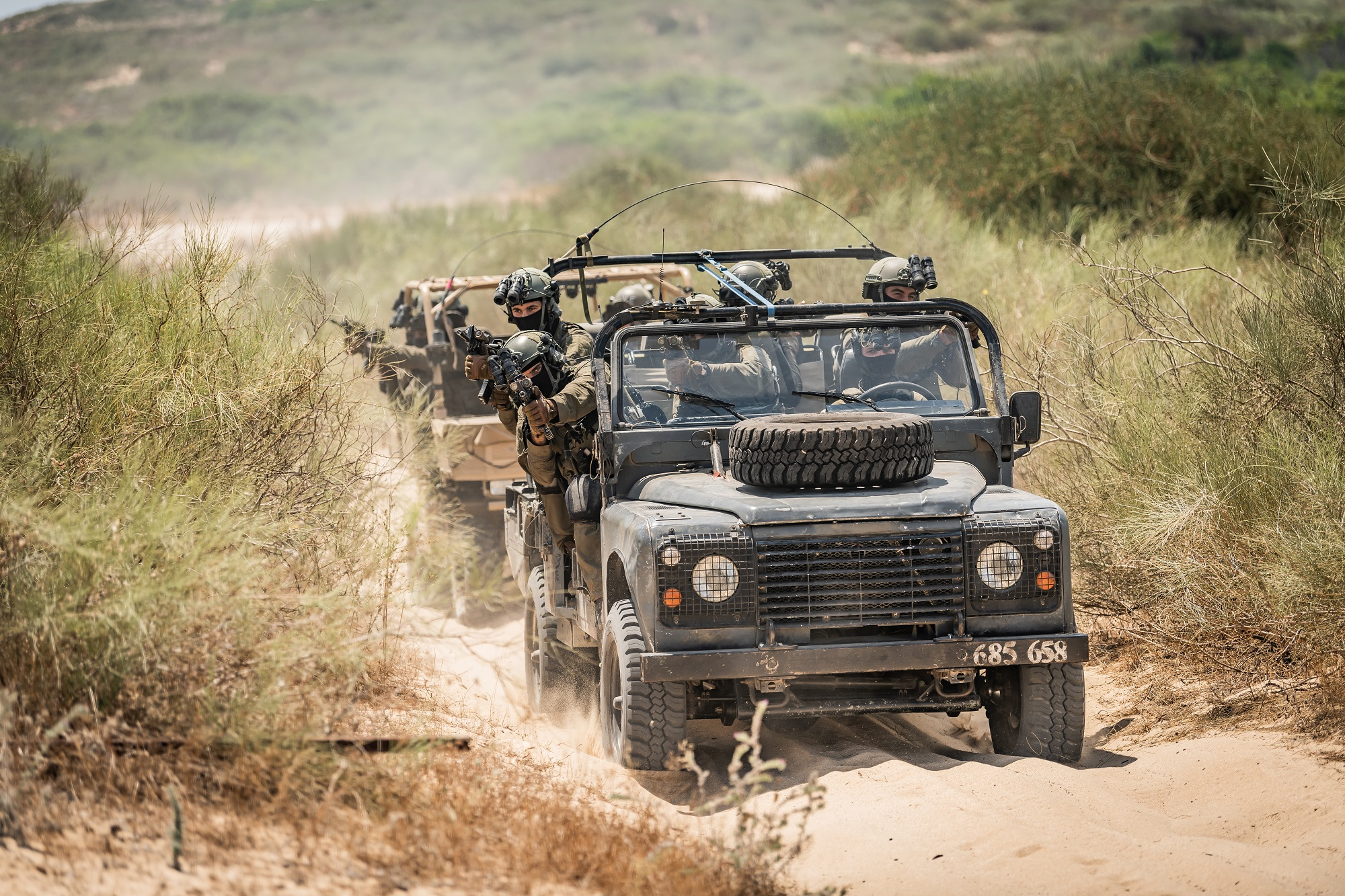
Shaldag Unit

The unit's warrior pin and the unit's insignia were created in 1987 while Avihu Ben-Nun was the IAF commander. The warrior pin includes a kingfisher, wings, and a star of David. The unit's name apparently originates from a saying of David Stirling: that his unit would come down on an enemy like a kingfisher comes down on its prey.

== Known operations ==
Shaldag carried out several missions during Operation Litani of 1978. One of its last missions was reconnaissance near Hasbaya. The unit crossed into enemy territory, came under fire, and a team commander lost his leg to a landmine. The company commander managed to retreat without further casualties or the loss of equipment. It took part in the 1982 Lebanon War, and assisted in Operation Mole Cricket 19.

In 1984 Shaldag took part in Operation Moses in Sudan. In 1991 it took part in Operation Solomon: On May 24–25, under the command of Benny Gantz, Shaldag unit secured the airlift of 14,000 Ethiopian Jews from Addis Ababa to Israel. During the First Intifada, its operatives were the first to mount undercover operations in civilian disguises in the Palestinian territories, prior to the formation of the Samson Unit and Duvdevan Unit.

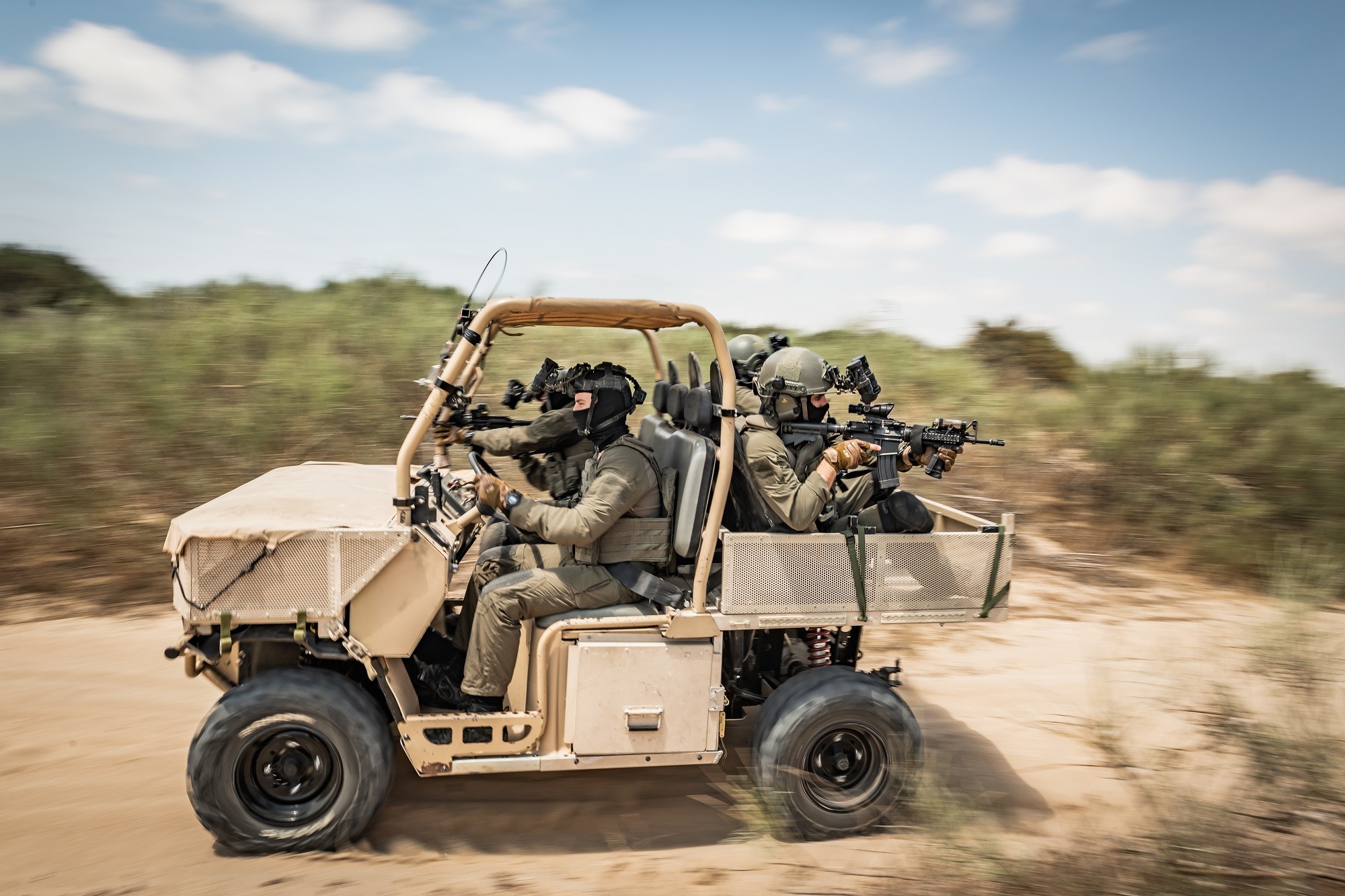
Shaldag soldiers

During the 1982–2000 South Lebanon conflict, Shaldag took part in operations Accountability and Grapes of Wrath. It proved particularly valuable during the latter, when it helped quickly pinpoint Hezbollah rocket squads in time for the Israeli Air Force to take them out. It received the Chief of Staff Citation for its conduct in that operation. It also participated in the Second Intifada, and is known to have been responsible for the assassination of Yussef Abu Sway, a Palestinian militant who had taken part in shooting attacks against Israelis. During the 2006 Lebanon War, Shaldag took part in Operation Sharp and Smooth, the August 1 raid on Baalbek. Delivered by helicopters near Baalbek at 01:00, its troops proceeded north to the Sheik Habib neighborhood in order to arrest suspected Hezbollah operatives. En route, they encountered four Hezbollah fighters and killed them. A total of 19 Hezbollah fighters were killed, with no Israeli fatalities.

In 2007 Shaldag was also reportedly involved in Operation Orchard, the destruction of a Syrian nuclear reactor. The unit is reported to have infiltrated an underground depot near the Syrian site suspected of being a nuclear reactor, in order to designate the target for the incoming Israeli fighters that destroyed it.

During the 2014 Gaza War, Shaldag operatives assisted in uncovering Hamas tunnels, and provided support for IDF units operating during fighting in Gaza. Notably, a Shaldag sniper team supported Nahal Brigade infantry forces in the northern Gaza Strip.

According to the Israeli Air Force's official twitter, Shaldag is actively involved in the Gaza war.

=== October 7 surprise attack ===
Following the surprise attack on Israel on October 7, 2023, the unit was deployed to fight Hamas terrorists in the communities they had infiltrated. The unit's fighters were flown by helicopters to the rear of the terrorist units and fought in the Battle of Re'im Camp, the Battle of Kibbutz Be'eri, the Battle of Kibbutz Alumim, the Battle of Holit, and the Battle of Kfar Aza. Sayeret Matkal fighters fought for long hours to clear the communities of terrorists and rescue the residents. In the following days, they engaged in face-to-face combat with terrorists in several hotspots, killing dozens of terrorists and rescuing dozens of residents. During the battles to liberate the communities, five of the unit's fighters were killed.

=== 2023 Israeli invasion of the Gaza Strip ===
The unit participated in the raid on Shifa Hospital and the exposure of Hamas's tunnel network beneath it, together with Yahalom fighters from the Combat Engineering Corps and Oketz Unit. During the operation at Shifa Hospital, Sayeret Matkal fighters arrested five Hamas fighters and uncovered about 30 vehicles belonging to the terrorists, some equipped with military gear and communication devices.

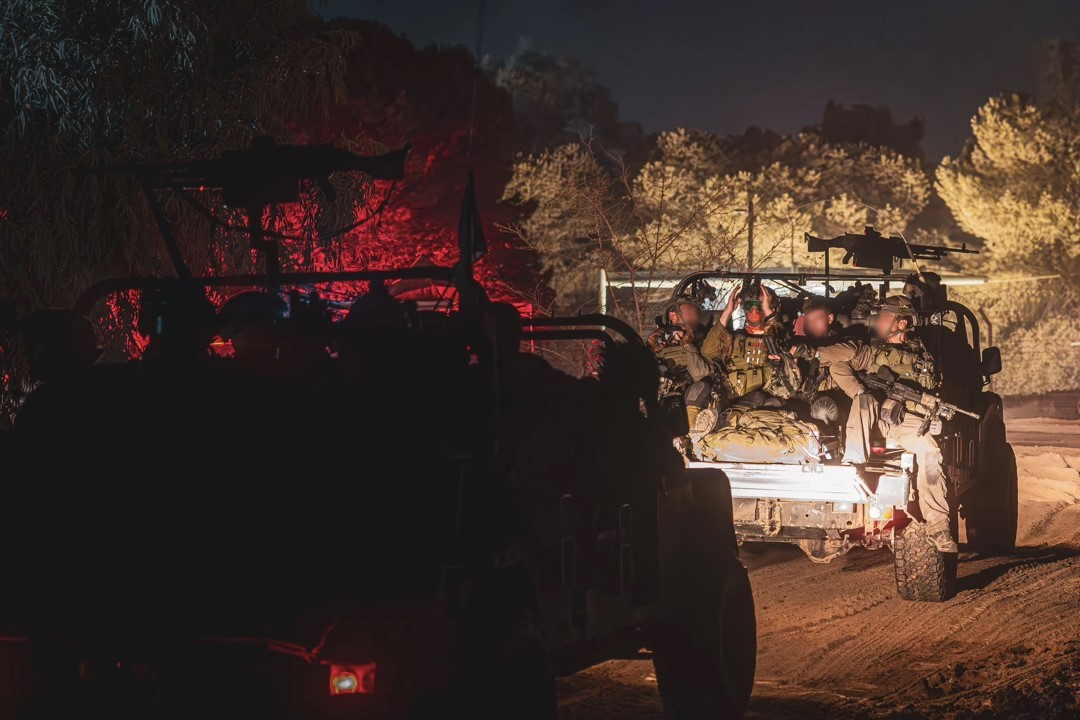
Shaldag soldiers

On December 20, Sayeret Matkal, along with Shayetet 13, the 401st Brigade, and Oketz fighters, completed the takeover of the "Senior Officials' Quarter" of Hamas in Palestine Square in the Rimal neighborhood in central Gaza City. The quarter served as the main governmental and security hub of Hamas. The complex includes an extensive tunnel network connecting the offices of senior officials, safe houses, offices, and residences of the military wing and the military leadership of Hamas in the Gaza Strip.

=== Raid in Masyaf ===
On September 8, 2024, the journalist Barak Ravid reported on the Axios website that the Shaldag unit conducted a raid in Syria near the city of Masyaf and destroyed an underground precision missile factory that built by Iran. The Shaldag soldiers surprised the Syrian guards at the facility and killed several of them during the raid. The forces used explosives they brought with them in order to blow up the underground facility. At the same time as the raid, fighter jets of the Israeli Air Force carried out the airstrikes designed to prevent the Syrian army from sending reinforcements to the area. This was confirmed by the Israeli Air Force in January 2025.

=== 2024 Israeli invasion of Syria ===
The Shaldag unit partook in military operations during the Israeli invasion of Syria in December 2024. During the invasion, the unit conducted a raid into the Mount Hermon area located within the United Nations Disengagement Observer Force (UNDOF) buffer zone in the Golan Heights. The raid was confirmed by a Twitter post by the Israeli Air Force, with photos depicting the unit's troops on Mount Hermon during the raid.

== Notable members ==
- Muki Betser
- Benny Gantz
- Doron Almog
- Tal Russo
- Gal Hirsch

== See also ==
- United States Air Force Combat Control Team
- Israeli special forces units
