= Para-SAR =

Brazilian Air Force special operations search and rescue unit

Airborne Rescue Squadron
- Esquadrão Aeroterrestre de Salvamento
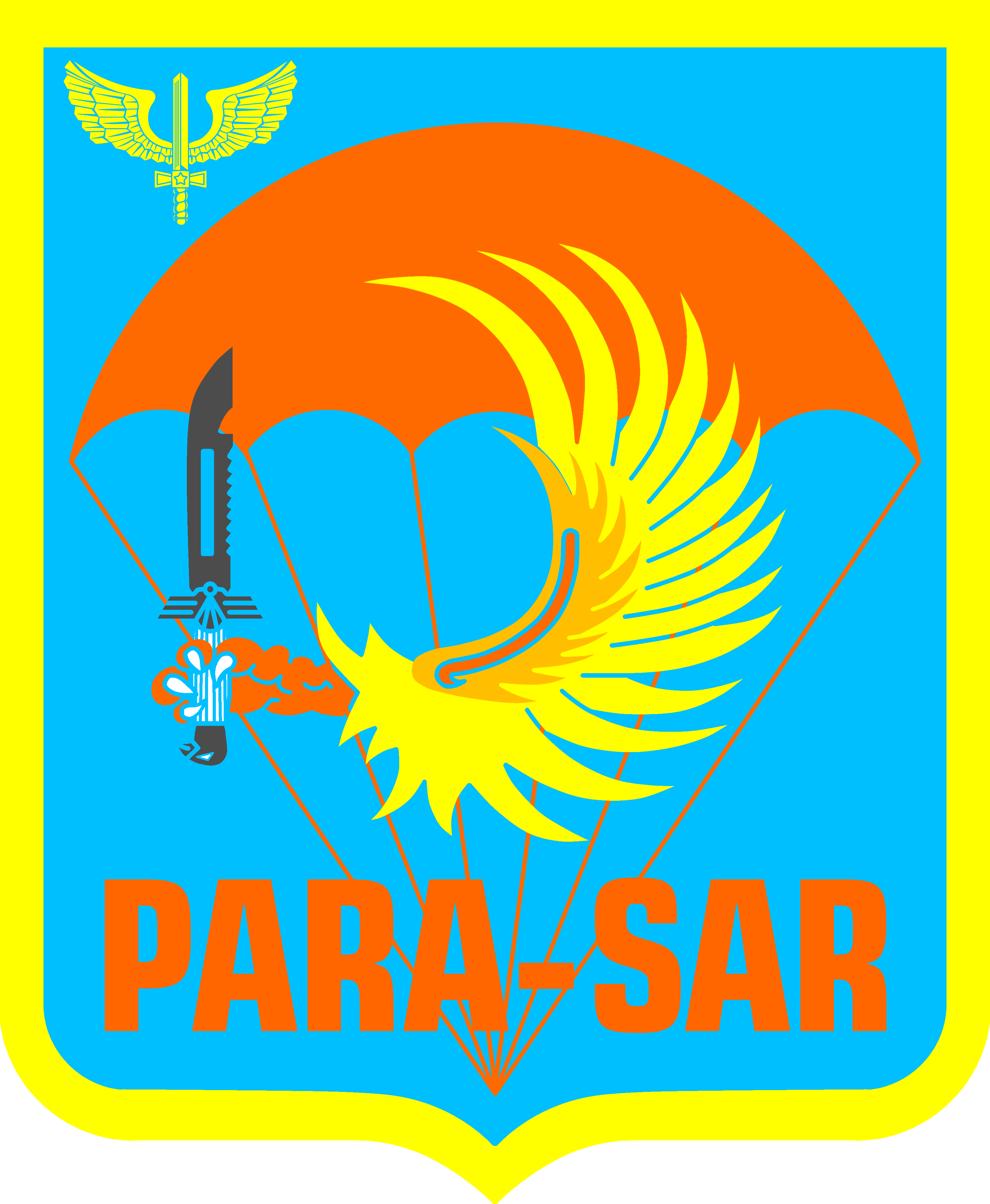
- Coat of Arms
- Active: 2 September 1963; 63 years ago
- Country: Brazil
- Branch: Brazilian Air Force
- Type: Special forces
- Role: Search and Rescue
- Garrison/HQ: Campo Grande
- Nickname: Para-SAR

The Esquadrão Aeroterrestre de Salvamento (EAS) (English: Airborne Rescue Squadron), known by its nickname Para-SAR,is a special forces unit of the Brazilian Air Force (Força Aérea Brasileira), based in the city of Campo Grande.

The unit has no aircraft of its own and its airborne personnel conduct special operations by being dropped from other units' aircraft. The unit has seven SAR teams located in seven states.

Each Para-SAR detachment is made up of SAR qualified military parachutists. Members of this unit can be distinguished by their maroon berets and orange baseball caps.

== History ==
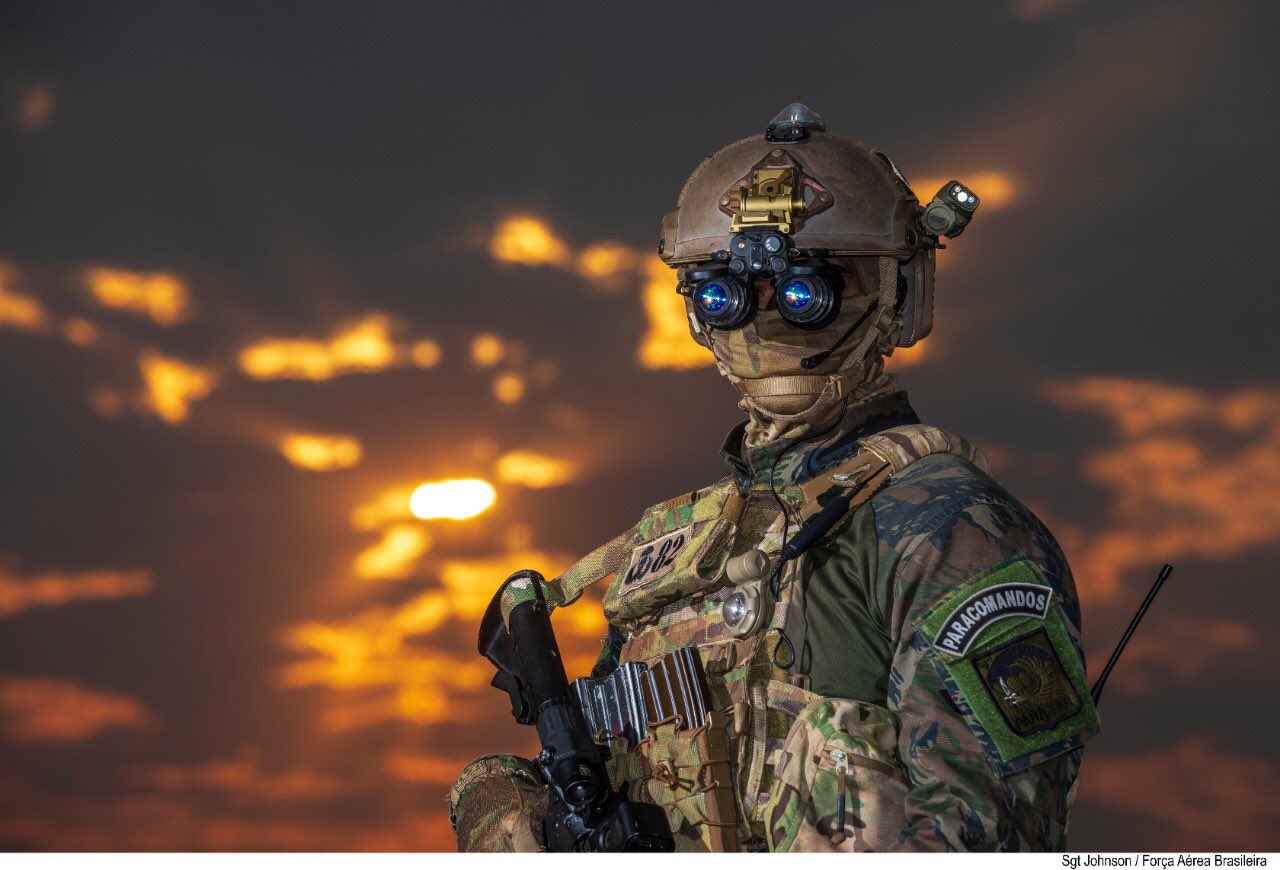
A Para-SAR commando.

The Brazilian Air Force has a long history of parachute training. In 1943, at the former Afonsos Field School of Aeronautics and with the support of the Air Force, cadet academy instructor Achile Garcia Charles Astor first introduced civil parachute training in Brazil.

Seeing the usefulness of having a parachuting unit, the Electronics and Flight Protection Administration conducted studies to see how such a unit could be created under the auspices of the air force. The results of that study gave rise to the Para-SAR.

In 1946, the Brazilian Army (Exército Brasileiro) formed its parachute school, the now-named General Penha Brazil Parachutist's Instruction Center. It graduated its first class of Brazilian Air Force students in 1959.

The group initially consisted of a division of three officers and five sergeants whose mandate was to provide instruction to the cadets of the School of Aeronautics and to provide combat search and rescue, by means of the DEPV. The unit also consisted of a group of volunteers who trained at the old military aviation school and went on to provide help in accidents and under special circumstances.

Eventually, on 2 September 1963, the Airborne Rescue unit was formed. Para-SAR is the traditional name given to the search and rescue arm of the air force and is housed in the old School of Aeronautics.

By November 20, 1973, the flotilla no longer existed, becoming the Airborne Rescue Squadron, or EAS. Its mandate was to continue training of the BAF parachutists, the instruction and the administration of the combat search and rescue teams and helicopter squadrons among other tasks.

== Mission ==
The Para-SAR mandate includes specialized instruction for crewmembers and rescue teams of the Brazilian Air Force, SAR and special warfare operations.

== Training ==
New members of the squadron start with the Brazilian Army parachute course and then complete courses such as aerial resupply, air assault, basic defusing and disposal of land mines, basic hand-to-hand combat, demolition, frontline military intelligence gathering, jungle warfare and mountain warfare with small unit tactics, maneuver warfare, marksmanship, military communications, parachute packing and maintenance, using a map and compass, and using small arms and light weapons (SALW) techniques. They then move onto advanced training.

The following training programs are offered by the squadron:

=== Search and rescue ===
This course includes: aircraft access; firefighting; machines, engines and radio equipment; free diving; helilift operations; orientation and ground searches; jungle and sea survival; pre-hospital care; combat search and rescue tactics; mountain search and rescue; search and rescue theory and tactical first aid.

=== Scuba diving ===
Graduates become qualified in scuba diving which is typically used to recover charges and pieces of submerged aircraft and recovery including underwater infiltration to expand the scope of special warfare operations.

=== Airborne techniques ===
Graduates are qualified to parachute out of a military aircraft as well as air drop supplies, precision landing, calculate the effects of wind and carry out the pathfinder role.

They also learn packing, inspecting and repairing parachutes. Also taught are techniques for aircraft operations using the Lockheed C-130 Hercules and C-95.

=== Skydiving ===
The course teaches parachutists operational skydiving, the use of instruments and equipment; skydiving from both low and high altitudes and jumping with weapons and equipment for military operations.

=== Master skydiver ===
Graduates of this course become qualified in all aspects of skydiving, from organizing the jump team to coordinating the aircraft to be used. Students are also given a knowledge of meteorology and reading weather reports as well as precision targeting, advanced navigation skills and techniques of free fall Basic Body Fly.

=== Commando ===
The Brazilian Air Force commando course teaches advance combat search and rescue (CSAR), including locating downed crews in a hostile environment, planning the evacuation of the wounded from behind enemy lines, and survival, evasion, resistance, and escape (SERE).

The course also covers advance hand-to-hand combat, air traffic control, assault and airfield seizure, close-quarters battle (CQB), counterterrorism involving airplanes and hostage rescue, defusing and disposal of bombs and land mines, executive protection, fast tactical shooting, forward air control, infiltrating the area using various types of aircraft or vehicles, military special operations against guerrilla warfare, NBCR on operations in contaminated environments, providing security in international airport or air force bases areas at risk of terrorism, special reconnaissance, and urban warfare subjects.

== Badges ==
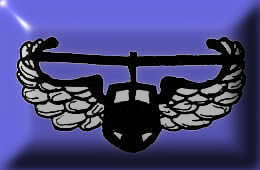
SAR badge

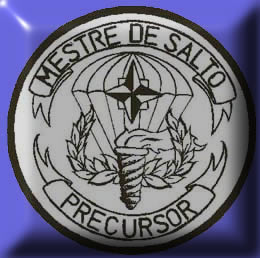
Pathfinder badge

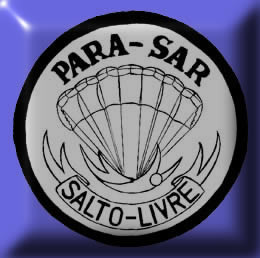
HAHO/HALO badge

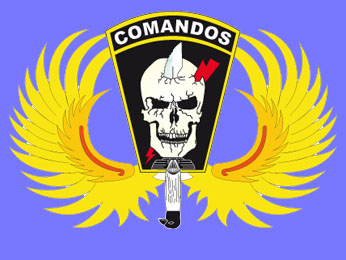
Commando badge

== See also ==
- List of special forces units
- United States Air Force Pararescue
- Unit 669
