= Unit 669 =

Israeli Air Force Combat Search and Rescue Unit

Special Tactics Rescue Unit 669
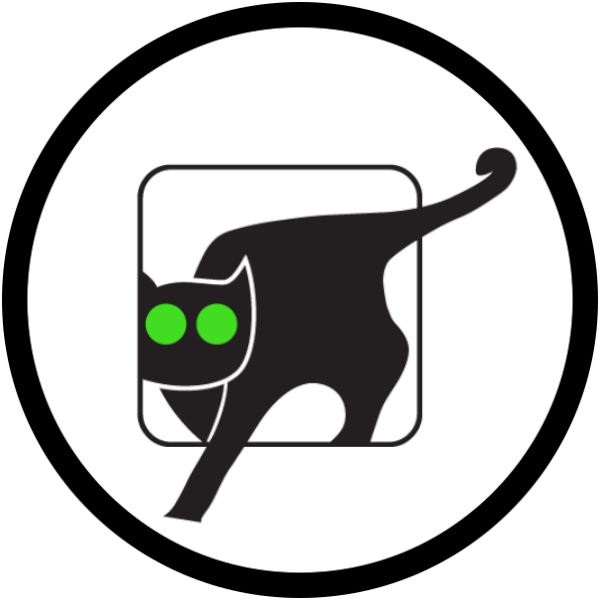
- Unit 669 badge
- Active: 1974-Present
- Country: Israel
- Branch: Israeli Air Force
- Type: Special forces
- Role: Combat Search and Rescue; MEDEVAC; Direct action Counter-terrorism
- Part of: 7th Special Forces of Air Forces Wing
- Mottos: בצרה קראת ואחלצך; You called upon me in times of trouble, and I rescued you Psalm 81:7
- Engagements: 1982 Lebanon War; 2006 Lebanon War; Operation Cast Lead; Operation Protective Edge; Gaza war 2024 Israeli invasion of Lebanon

The Unit 669 (Hebrew: יחידה טקטית לחילוץ מיוחד 669, romanized: Yechida Taktit LeChilu'tz Meyuchad 669, lit. 'Tactical unit for special rescue') is a heliborne combat search and rescue extraction unit, subordinate to the 7th Wing of the Israeli Air Force.

It is based at Tel Nof Airbase with CH-53D Sea Stallion Yas'ur helicopters and Palmachim Airbase with UH-60 Black Hawk Yanshuf helicopters.

== History ==
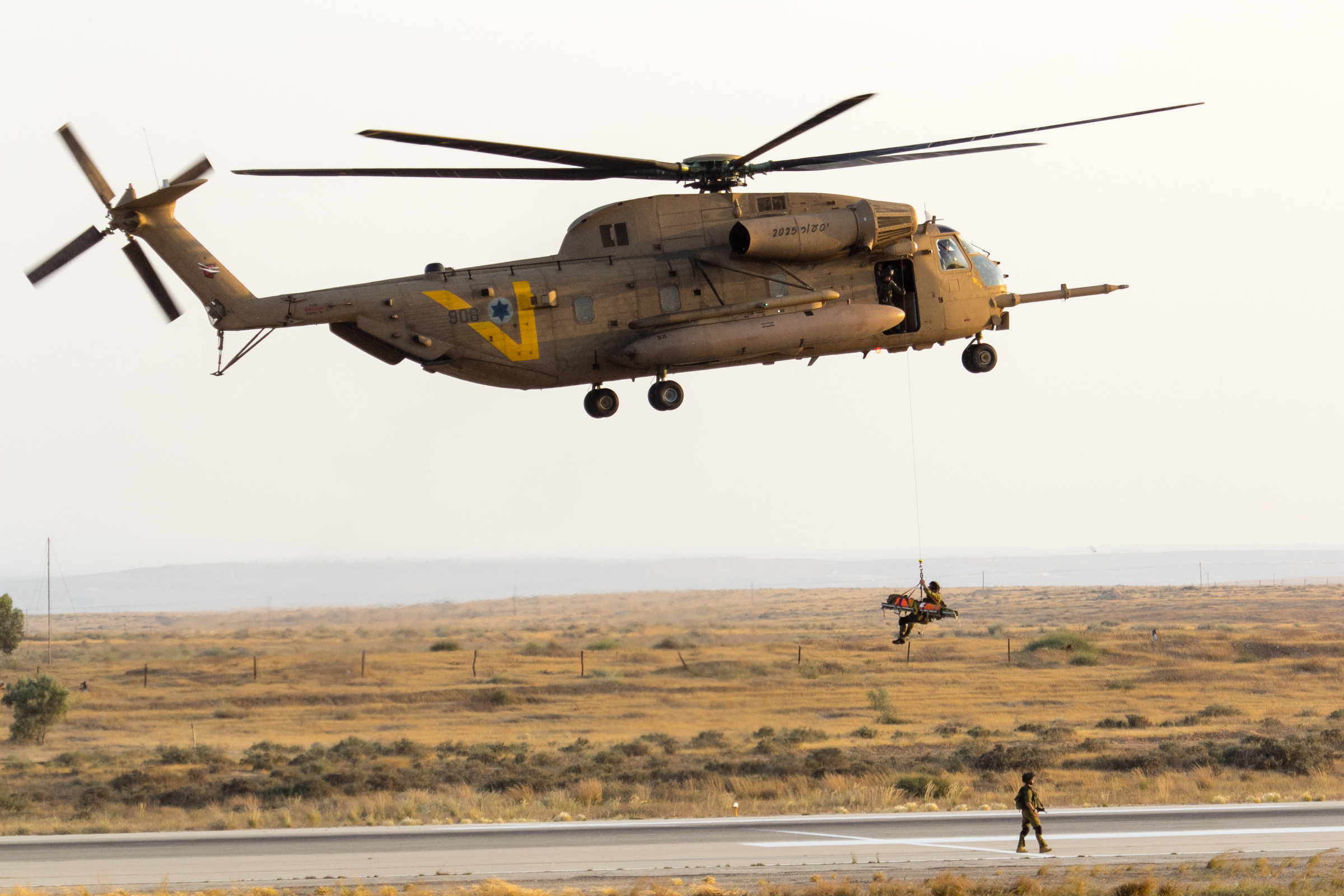
Unit 669 heliborne MEDEVAC display during IAF cadet graduation ceremony.

Unit 669 was founded in 1974 by Yoram Shachar and Avner Ilnai, in the aftermath of the 1973 Yom Kippur War, when an ad hoc medevac unit made some 5000 extractions. Its initial mandate was to extract and provide initial medical treatment to downed (and possibly injured) pilots beyond lines. However, in later years the unit also participated in extraction of soldiers of other arms of the Israel Defense Forces, especially Sayeret (Special Forces) fighters in operations beyond enemy lines and seamen in distress.

Unit 669 operated in the Gaza war, according to the Israeli Air Force. During the war, the unit has carried out medical evacuations for wounded soldiers, and carried out 200 other operations since the beginning of the war.

On 6 December 2023, two female soldiers passed the selection process for the elite Unit 669. They will be the first women to start their journey in the unit.

== Symbol ==
Unit 669 emblem

The Unit's logo is a slinking and green-eyed black cat. The emblem also has wings. The Unit's warriors are subsequently sometimes referred to as "Cats" or "Flying Cats".

The unit's number, 669, is a reference to the 669 children saved from Czechoslovakia by Nicholas Winton during World War II.

== Recruitment and training ==
In order to be considered for service in the unit, candidates must have a medical profile between 82-97. Candidates who pass the initial commando units day selection, undergo a five-day commando selection trial for Sayeret Matkal / Shaldag / Unit 669. Candidates who are accepted are enlisted in the November draft.

Due to the possibility of having to fight their way to casualties beyond enemy lines, unit soldiers are highly trained in special forces tactics and become highly efficient ground soldiers in addition to their high level of medical training. Their training and selection lasts 18 months and is considered to be among the most physically and psychologically demanding of the IDF. Courses that candidates must pass include:

- Basic training with the IDF Paratroopers
- Special operations combat training
- Special operations combat medics' course (select soldiers continue on to paramedics' course)
- Advanced land warfare including jungle warfare, desert warfare, and urban warfare
- Counter-terrorism course in the IDF Counter-Terror Warfare School
- Scuba Diving course and Rescue Diver course
- Rappelling and high angle rescue course
- Advanced helicopter infiltration and exfiltration tactics
- Rescue under harsh conditions
- Parachuting course in the IDF Parachuting School
- Advanced solo navigation
- Commanders' course

Upon completion of their training, unit soldiers are expected to sign on for an extra 18 months of service in addition to the standard three-year mandatory service. Cost of training is estimated to be 1 million Israeli new shekel per individual.

== Component ==
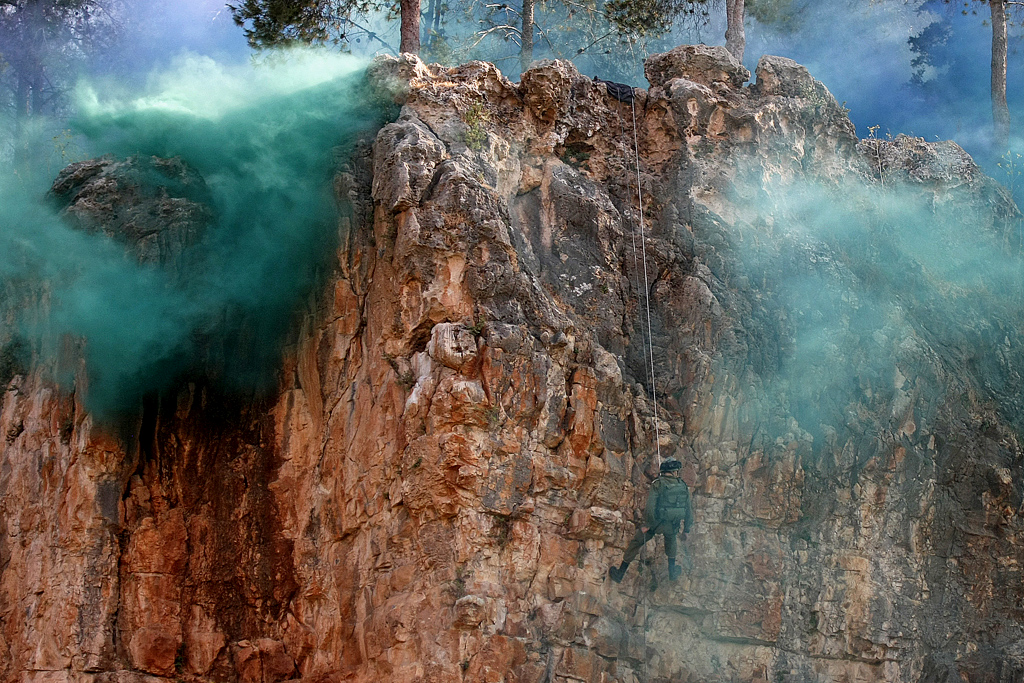
669 operative in cliff rescue display

A typical rescue team from 669 consists of a mix of 669 specialized warfighters and doctors. The unit itself is composed of five branches:

"Extraction". The "extraction" branch (Hebrew: חילוץ, Hiluz) has a company of advanced and specialized infantrymen. These soldiers have passed the 18 month 669 training regimen, and have a fundamental medical background as well as the tools to execute complicated rescues on land or at sea, in peacetime or under fire.

"Evacuation". The "evacuation" branch (Hebrew: פינוי, Pinu'i) has a company of airborne doctors, paramedics, and nurses. These medical personnel are critical to the mission by bringing advanced and specialized medical knowledge and experience to the injured, both in the field and in the air on the way to the hospital.

"Training School". Combat Search and Rescue and Air Crew Survival School

"MIA". Locating Missing In Action Combatants. Includes skilled field personnel.

Technical support group. The largest branch, the technical support group is composed of non-combat soldiers who assist in logistics for the unit.

== Operational activity ==
669 is the IDF's primary rescue unit. The mandate of the unit is to rescue downed pilots and execute airborne medical evacuation of critical casualties. Due to the unique specialties and high proficiency of 669, the unit may also accept various other special operations missions depending on the needs of the Air Force and IDF.

=== Selected engagements ===
Unit 669 has been credited with hundreds of rescues. Some of the more high-profile missions are listed below.

On September 15, 1997, the Shayetet 13 Naval Commandos sent an assault team to conduct a raid in Lebanon. The team encountered an improvised explosive device (IED) and was ambushed by Hezbollah in what has subsequently been called the Ansariya Ambush. 13 of the naval commandos were killed and 3 were injured. Unit 669 responded by sending a team to evacuate the injured commando team, while taking heavy enemy fire. For bravery and performance under fire the 669 team received a formal citation.

In 2003, 669 rescued ten Turkish seamen when they were caught in a heavy storm in the Mediterranean Sea. Under these severe weather and sea conditions, the 669 soldiers rescued and evacuated the sailors from their ship at sea.

During the Second Lebanon War (2006) and Operation Cast Lead (2008), Unit 669 made dozens of high-profile rescues of injured soldiers under enemy fire.

During the 2014 military campaign Protective Edge, 669 evacuated hundreds of casualties. These rescues, often under fire, earned the unit a formal citation award from the Chief of Staff of the IDF.

=== 669 Special Operators ===
The defining factor for an operator in Unit 669 is the ability to make difficult decisions under pressure. Due to the small-team nature of the unit, every soldier is expected to be a leader. All unit combat soldiers must pass a commander's course during their training. This is unlike typical IDF infantry units, where only a minority of the soldiers are recommended for the commander's course. After the 18-month training pipeline in 669 and once the soldier has collected combat experience, an additional advanced commander's course is required. This intensive course is entirely mission-based, and instructs advanced command and control methods and leadership. The advanced commander's course also functions as a selection process: the soldiers with the highest scores are chosen to be the next generation of small-team rescue commanders of the unit.

The demands on these small-team commanders are great, including the ability to manage radio communications and issue orders simultaneously to pilots, ground forces, doctors, and their subordinate rescue soldiers. This must be done from inside the helicopter on the way to the target and on the ground after landing. Difficult decisions that can mean the difference between life and death must be made under fire and under severe time pressure, with imperfect information and no pre-mission preparation. Due to the emergency responder nature of the unit, the type of mission, time of day, and location cannot be anticipated. Therefore, these commanders and their soldiers must know all specialties from their training perfectly (diving, rappelling, etc.), because there is no time to review them when the mission siren goes off.

== Non-military activity ==
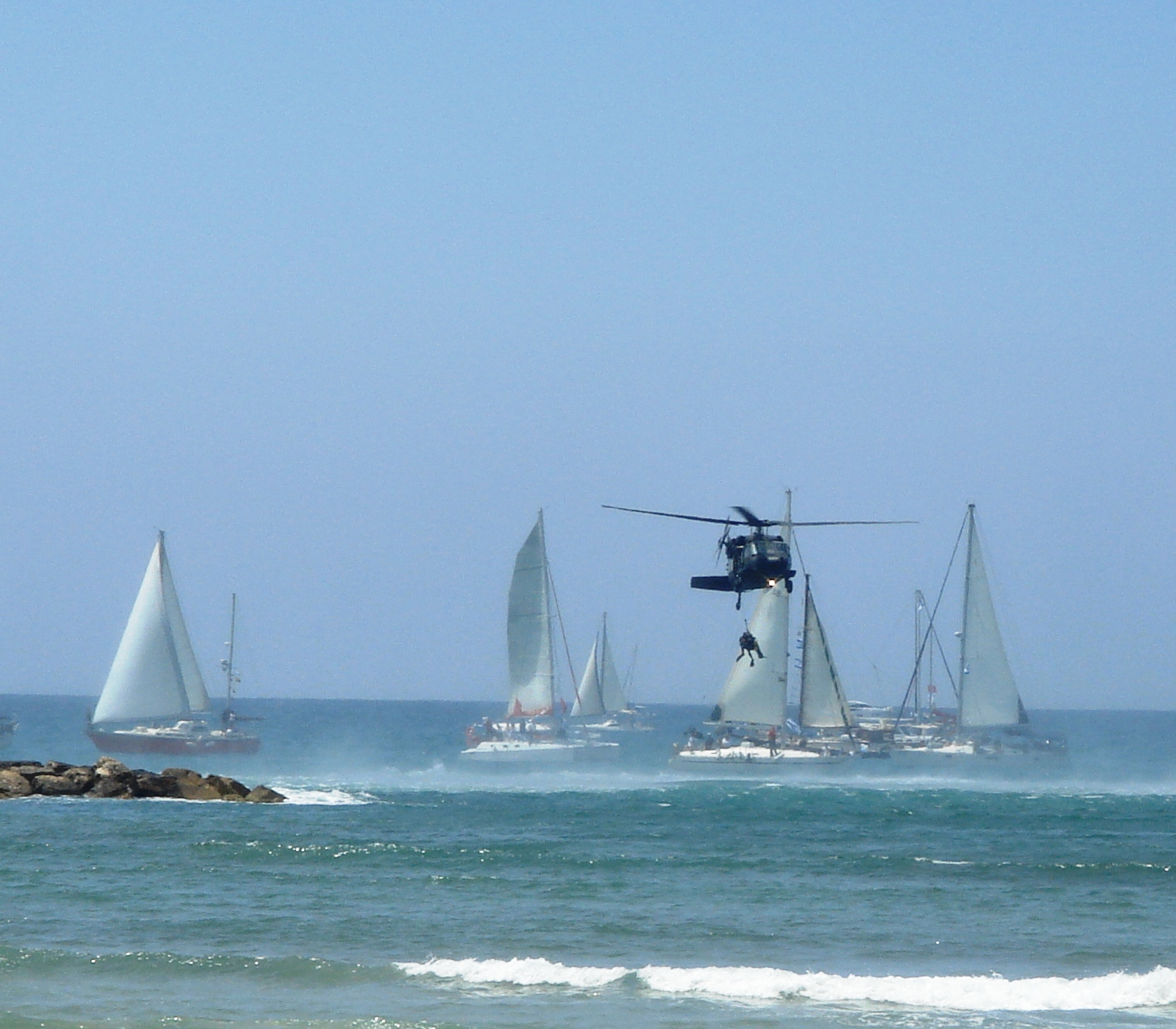
Unit 669 rescue divers training in the Mediterranean.

=== Domestic ===
During peacetime, the unit often helps rescue civilians injured during various catastrophic incidents. The unit has also served as a civilian medevac for hikers who have gotten lost or stuck and need extraction from Israel's deserts or canyons. These civilian operations, while expensive, help train the unit fighters for their wartime roles. There is an ongoing debate whether extracted hikers should be forced to pay at least part of the extraction cost, especially in cases of hiker negligence or improper call for extraction. In the past, the unit's recruits had also patrolled agricultural areas for illegal animal traps.

=== Foreign ===
Unit 669 soldiers, including reservists, were among the IDF personnel sent to Nepal in late April 2015 to take part in search and rescue efforts in the aftermath of the earthquake and subsequent avalanches.

In 2012, 669 sent soldiers to Bulgaria following the Burgas bus bombing which targeted Israeli tourists. In a matter of hours after the attack, the 669 soldiers were already en route to Israel with 32 of the wounded for treatment in Israel.

== Notable figures ==
- Former unit commander (1978-1980) Dr. Efraim Sneh, rose to become a Brigadier General, a Knesset member and government minister (Health; Transportation; deputy Defense Minister).

== See also ==
- Shaldag
- Bahad 16 – IDF Home Front Search & Rescue Unit
- United States Air Force Combat Rescue Officer
- Para-SAR – Brazilian equivalent

== Books ==
- Itay Ilnai, 669 – A Tale of a Special Unit (in Hebrew), Kinneret, Zmora-Bitan, Dvir Publishing, 2014
