= Oketz Unit =

Israel Defense Forces unit

Oketz
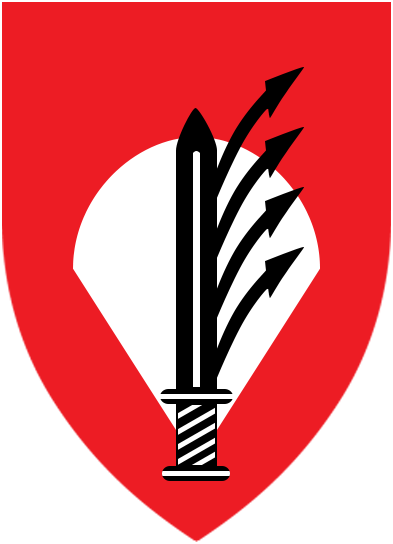
- Oketz unit insignia
- Active: 1939–1954; 1975–present
- Country: Israel
- Allegiance: Israel Defense Forces
- Branch: Israeli Ground Forces
- Role: Canine Unit, Search and Rescue, Bomb Detection
- Part of: Special and Aviation Training Center
- Motto: ההולכים בראש

Insignia
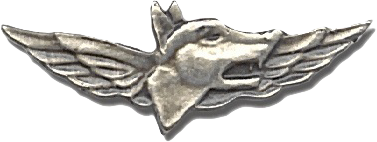
- Identification symbol

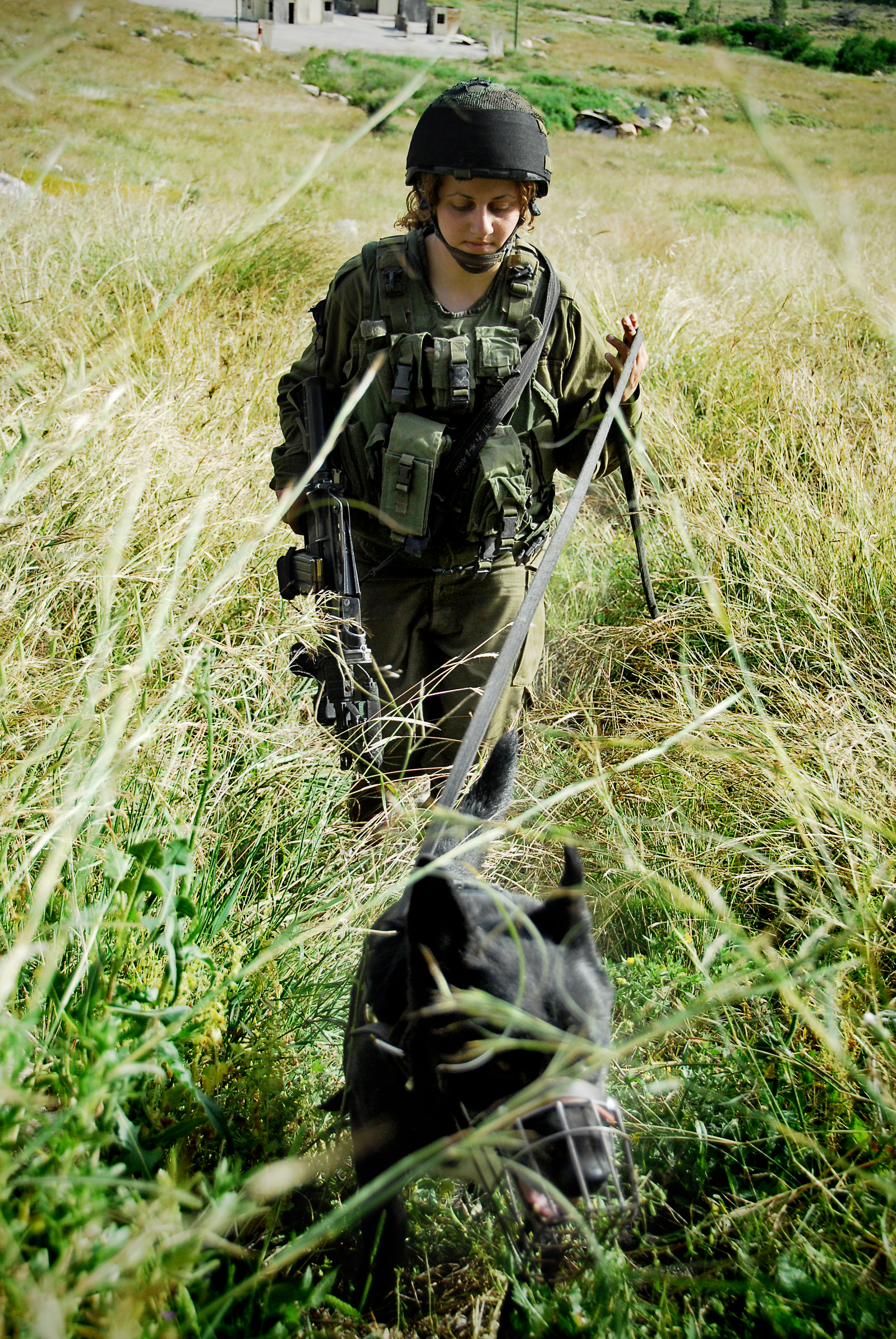
A soldier of Oketz and her dog

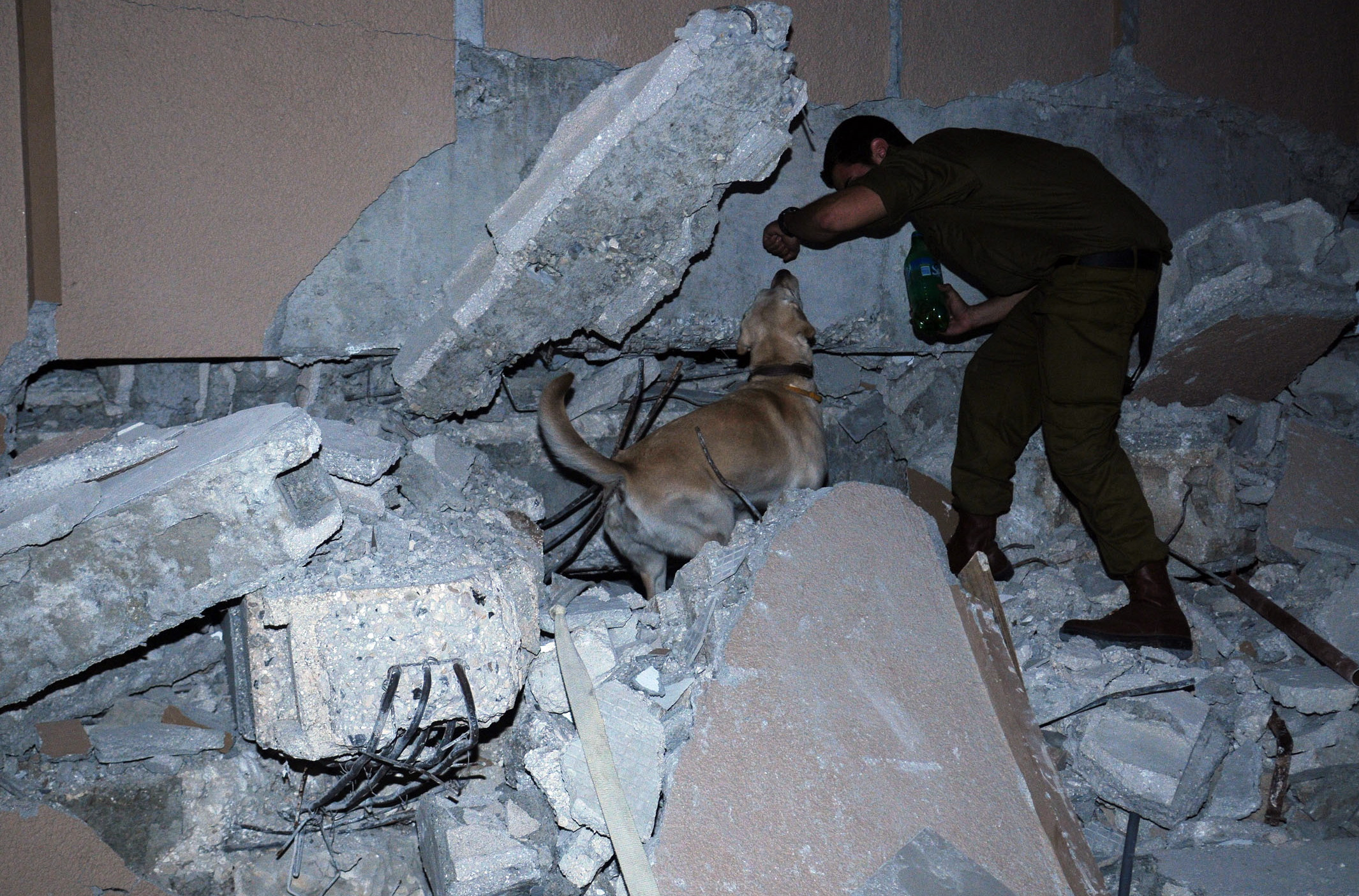
A canine handler from the IDF Oketz Canine Unit and his dog in the ruins of the Haiti UN headquarters, trying to locate survivors under the rubble. January 16, 2010.

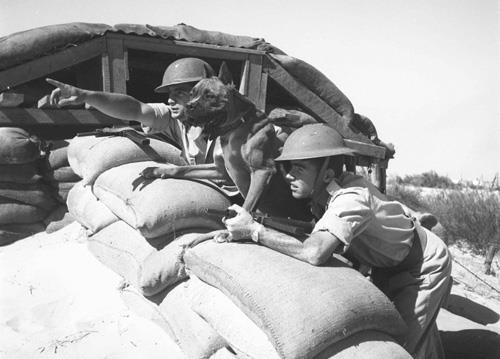
Dog training in the IDF, c. November 1948.

The Oketz Unit (Note: (Hebrew: יחידת עוקץ, lit. sting)), also designated as Unit 7142, is the independent canine special forces (sayeret) unit of the Israel Defense Forces.

== History ==
A dog-handling unit was founded in 1939 as part of Haganah, subsequently becoming part of the IDF after independence in 1948. It was dissolved in 1954. In 1974, a new unit was established by Yossi Labock, who was its first commander. The unit specializes in training and handling dogs for military applications. Originally, Oketz trained dogs to attack kidnappers, but training has since become more specialized, and now each dog is trained in a particular specialty. Attack dogs are trained to operate in both urban and rural areas (they were used extensively in Lebanon). Some dogs are trained to track and pursue selected targets for manhunts and to detect breaches at the Israeli border. Others are trained to search for guns and munitions, to sniff out hidden explosives, and to find people in collapsed buildings.

Oketz operators are often assigned to other units when said units are in need of their specialist skills, for instance, the extraction of terrorists from fortified buildings. Though not affiliated with the IDF Paratroopers Brigade, Oketz operators wear the same distinctive red berets and the unit's graduation ceremony is held at the Paratroopers headquarters. However, in order to join Oketz, the recruit must choose the Kfir Infantry Brigade as their preferred choice in the request form and then pass the unit's trials.

Another use for dogs were to strap explosives to them, and then blow them up (by remote control) when they reached their target. In Operation Blue and Brown (Kachol Ve’hum) in Lebanon, 1986 such a dog was used in the failed attempt to assassinate Ahmed Jibril. The operation, which Bergman calls "an embarrassing flop", ended with one Israeli killed, and the dog was "frightened by the shooting and ran away". The dog was later recovered by Hezbollah.

The Oketz Unit took part in the response to 7 October 2023 against Hamas militants: "Ran praised one of the dogs for saving lives in the battle."

According to Euro-Med Human Rights Monitor in June 2024—after video appeared of a 60-year-old woman in her home in the Jabalia refugee camp being mauled by dogs—the Israeli military was using dogs systematically to attack Palestinian civilians.

In July 2024, Mohammad Bhar, a 24-year-old Palestinian man with down syndrome and autism was mauled by a dog in his family home and left to die by Israeli soldiers.

In April 2026, the IDF said that a canine from the Oketz Unit was killed after revealing the location of a Hezbollah cell in Bint Jbeil, adding that all six militants were killed within an hour and a half of their identification and accused the group of violating the Israel- Lebanon truce.

== Dogs ==
Oketz prefers the Belgian Shepherd (Malinois), over the German Shepherd and Rottweiler, which were formerly employed by the unit. The reasons for this preference are twofold: one, the Malinois is large enough to effectively attack an enemy while still being small enough to be picked up by its handler, and two, their coats are short and typically of a neutral to fair color, making them less prone to heatstroke.

Previously, Canaan dogs were used by the unit, but had to be retired since they were too stubborn.

== See also ==
- Police dog
- War dog
