= 2023 Israeli female tank crew fight =

Engagement during Gaza War

- Part of the Battle of Sufa, the October 7 attacks, and the Gaza war
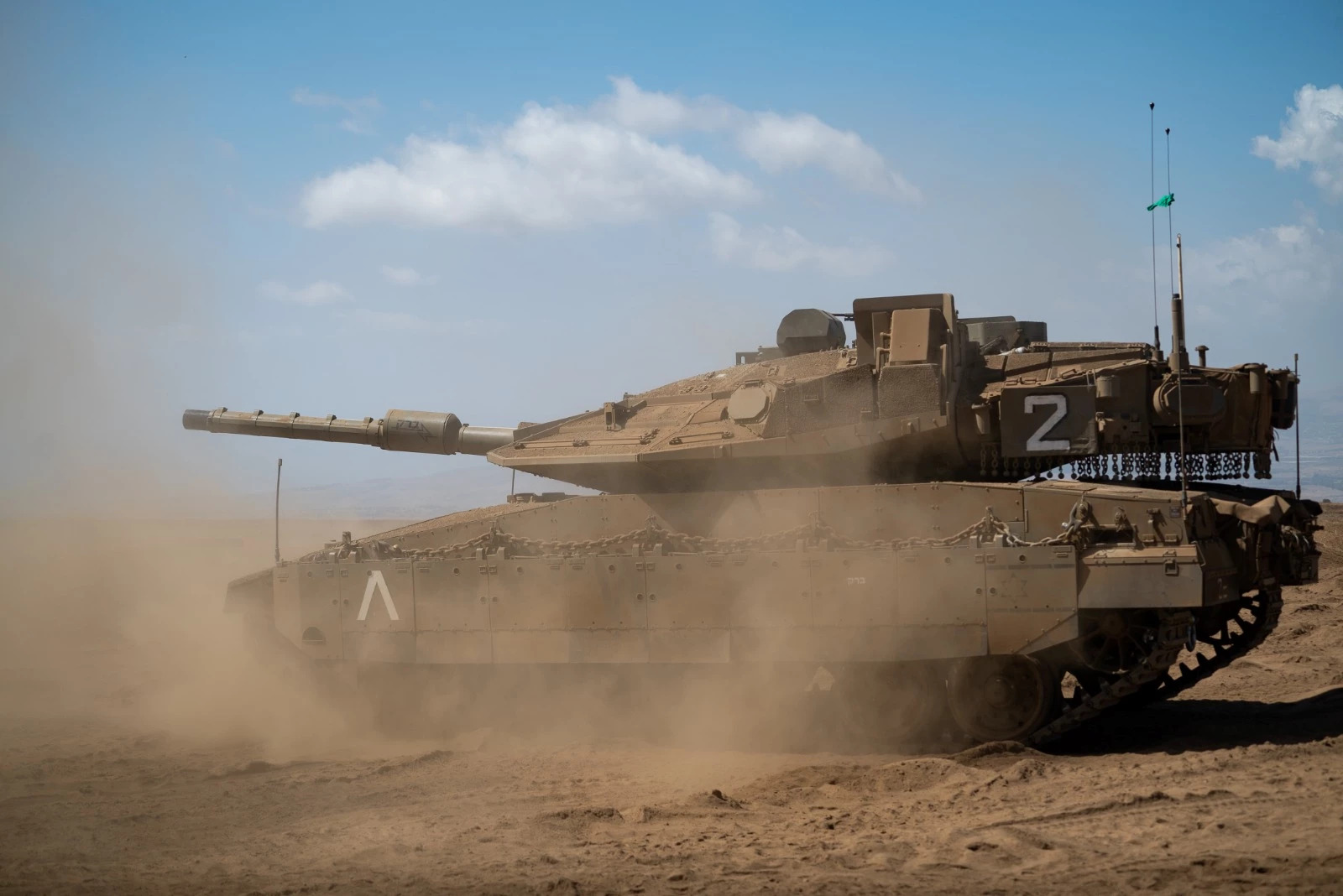
- Merkava Mk 4 Barak
Date	7 October 2023
Location	Holit and Sufa, Israel
Result	50 dead Hamas operatives

Belligerents
Hamas	Israel

Units involved
(Hamas) Al-Qassam Brigades	Caracal Battalion: 4 Merkava tanks; Tankers: Hagar, Hila, Tal, Michal, Karni, Ophir and Tamar; 1 Namer APC

On 7 October 2023, seven female Israeli tank crew members from the Caracal Battalion fought against Hamas militants continuously for 17 hours. The battle was the first instance in modern military history of an all-female armored unit taking part in combat. According to Israel, they killed 50 militants.

The performance of the unit and other acts by Israeli female soldiers on 7 October impacted the way women were viewed in the IDF and in the integration of women in the army.

Director Ayelet Menahemi and writer-actress Eleanor Sela announced in December 2023 that they were working on a featured film about the all-female tank unit's activities during the 7 October attacks.

Israel has promoted its female tank crews as part of its public relations war within the conflict.

== Background ==
The recruitment of women into combat positions in the Israel Defense Forces was slow until 1995, when a young soldier, Alice Miller, asked the Supreme Court of Israel to allow her to enroll in pilot training. As a result of the landmark decision, although Miller personally did not make it into the 3% of those who qualified, more combat positions in the army became available to female soldiers. In 2000, the first Israeli mixed-gender battalion, the Caracal Battalion, was created.

On 27 October 2022, the Israel Defense Forces announced that they had formed all-female tank crews, who had successfully completed two years of testing. The company is armed with Merkava IV tanks and is defending the Egyptian border. Chief of Staff Aviv Kochavi noted: "I believe that women tank crews will carry out the border protection mission professionally and with great success and will form a significant part of the IDF's operational efforts."

The all-female tank company was assigned to border defense missions and generally operated along the Israel-Egypt border. On the morning of October 7, crews from the company were at their home base in Nitzana, on the Egyptian border, before being deployed northward toward the Gaza Strip border.

== Course of events ==
On 7 October 2023, on the holiday of Simchat Torah, militants presumed to be from the militant group Hamas attacked Kibbutz Holit near the southern Gaza Strip in a surprise attack on Israel and killed at least 13 people.

The tank crew of the Caracal battalion, under the command of Captain Karni, was on the border with Egypt at the Nitsana base on the morning of 7 October, approximately 40 km south of the Gaza Strip, when they were alerted to the attack.

According to the recollections of senior sergeant Tal-Sarah, after arriving at Kibbutz Sufa and seeing a damaged IDF armored personnel carrier with wounded soldiers around it, her tank came under heavy fire from three directions, and she began to realize that they were under attack. She and the other 20-year-old female soldiers had not received training in firing the 50-caliber Katlanit remote weapons and had to improvise. They fought dozens of Hamas members, who were armed with AK-47s and RPGs.

They were joined by two more Merkava tanks. One was left near the gap in the border fence to block the movement of Hamas. The second tank and armored vehicle were among dozens of Hamas members with RPGs and other weapons. At the height of the battle, Karni called a third tank from the Nitzana base under the command of Sergeant Ophir, which arrived two hours later. Some Hamas members were killed and remaining members retreated back behind the border fence.

One of the Merkava tanks, under the command of Lieutenant Michal, began to help liberate Kibbutz Sufa from hundreds of Hamas members. After more than six hours of battle, her team killed dozens of Hamas members.

At the same time, the company commander, Captain Karni, moved from an armored personnel carrier to a tank and fought with the team in and around Kibbutz Holit, eliminating dozens of Hamas members. Then a tank under the command of Karmi drove through the closed main gate of the kibbutz and, seeing two members of Hamas in ambush on the side of the road, drove over them. They were able to repel the attack on the kibbutz. In total, the battle with the participation of Karni's company lasted about 17 hours. Seven 20-year-old Israeli tank crew members took part in the battle: Hagar, Hila, Tal-Sara, Michal, Karni, Ophir and Tamar, who allegedly killed 50 members of Hamas. Their last names have not been disclosed for security reasons.

== Legacy ==
The battle was the first known instance in modern military history of an all-female armored unit taking part in combat.

The performance of the unit, and other acts by Israeli female soldiers, on 7 October received praise from IDF leadership and impacted the way women were viewed in the IDF.

In an analysis for the Australian Financial Review, Aaron Patrick described the publicity surrounding at the female tank crews as part of a public relations campaign aimed to gaining Western support. Patrick argued that emphasizing women's participation in the military could also undermine left wing support for the Palestinian cause by contrasting gender equality in Israel with conditions under Hamas in the Gaza Strip. Military analyst Neil James similarly told the newspaper that female soldiers were used as a propaganda tool.

Director Ayelet Menahemi and writer-actress Eleanor Sela, whose feature Seven Blessings won the Ophir Prize and was submitted to the Academy Awards, announced in December 2023 that they were working on a movie about the all-female tank unit's activities during the October 7 attacks. According to the filmmakers, the film will depict the battle, the founding of the unit, and the struggles of female combatants in the IDF. The film is the first narrative feature to be announced on the attacks.

== See also ==
- Women in the Israel Defense Forces
- Women in the Gaza war
