= Sufa =

Sufa or SUFA may refer to:

- Sufa, Israel, a kibbutz in Israel and a border crossing between Israel and the Gaza Strip
- Sufa, Sinai, a former Israeli settlement in Sinai
- AIL Storm, also known as Sufa, an Israel Defense Forces vehicle
- INS Sufa, an Israeli Sea Corps Saar 4.5 class missile boat
- Social Union Framework Agreement, a Canadian labour agreement
- F-16I, also known as Sufa, a two seat Block 52 variant of the F-16 Fighting Falcon, heavily modified by the Israeli Defense Forces.
