= Or Ben-Yehuda =

Israeli military officer

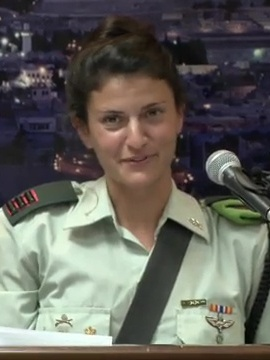
- Native name: אור ליבני-בן יהודה
- Born: 1989 (age 36–37); Mevaseret Zion
- Allegiance: Israel
- Service years: 2007-present
- Rank: Lieutenant Colonel
- Commands: Caracal Battalion

Or Livni Ben-Yehuda (Hebrew: אור ליבני-בן יהודה; born 1989) is an IDF officer who was in command of Caracal Battalion from July 2023 to July 2025, one of the mixed-gender IDF units. She is the first woman to command a border defense battalion in the IDF.

== Career ==
She enlisted in 2007 and after completing basic training attended the squad commanders’ course, then trained at Bahad 1 officer training school before being assigned as a platoon commander. She left for the reserve in 2012, but was soon recalled to reserve duty. She was wounded in 2014 after coming under fire by smugglers with machine guns and anti-tank weapons on the Sinai border.

In October 2023, she led Caracal Battalion in an hours-long battle in the Gaza envelope, halting the advance of Hamas, killing an estimated 100 of them.

She was interviewed by the New York Times about the experience of being a woman combat soldier in Gaza.

== See also ==
- Avraham Hovelashvili - deputy commander of Caracal battalion
