= 190 Squadron =

190 Squadron may refer to:

- 190 Squadron (Israel)
- No. 190 Squadron RAF, United Kingdom
- 190th Fighter Squadron, United States
