= Yevgen Korniychuk =

Ukrainian politician and diplomat (born 1966)

Yevgen Korniychuk (also transliterated as Yevhen Korniichuk or Evgeny Korniychuk; born in 1966) is a Ukrainian lawyer, politician, and diplomat who has served as Ukraine's ambassador to Israel since 2021.

== Education ==
Korniychuk was born in 1966 in Vinnytsia, Ukraine. He graduated from the Minsk Higher Military-Political School in 1987, then completed his law degree at the Faculty of Law of Taras Shevchenko National University of Kyiv in 1996. In 1998, he pursued further studies in international law at a school of Southern Methodist University in Texas.

== Political career ==
=== Verkhovna Rada ===
Korniychuk served as a member of the Verkhovna Rada (Ukrainian Parliament) for multiple terms, representing the Yulia Tymoshenko Bloc. He was elected to:

- The 4th Verkhovna Rada
- The 5th Verkhovna Rada (2006–2007), where he was listed as number 146 on the BYuT electoral list
- The 6th Verkhovna Rada (2007–2008), where he was listed as number 10 on the BYuT electoral list

According to the European Court of Human Rights case file, Korniychuk served as a Member of Parliament from May 25, 2006, to June 15, 2007, and from November 23, 2007, to May 23, 2008.

=== Ministry of Justice ===
From December 2007 to March 2010, Korniychuk served as First Deputy Minister of Justice in the Second Tymoshenko Government.

== Diplomatic career ==
=== Ambassador to Israel ===
Korniychuk was appointed as Ukraine's ambassador to Israel in 2021. He presented his credentials to Israeli President Reuven Rivlin in 2021.

Following Russia's full-scale invasion of Ukraine in February 2022, Korniychuk advocated for increased Israeli support for Ukraine. He has repeatedly called on Israel to provide military assistance, including the Iron Dome missile defense system, and to impose sanctions on Russia.

In March 2022, Korniychuk expressed his country's appreciation for Israeli Prime Minister Naftali Bennett's mediation efforts with Russia, while also calling for more active and urgent engagement in seeking a ceasefire.

In May 2023, an Israeli-made missile alert system began operating in Kyiv, which Korniychuk credited to Prime Minister Benjamin Netanyahu's personal involvement.

Korniychuk has emphasized connections between Russia's support for Iran and its backing of groups such as Hamas and Hezbollah, arguing that Israel and Ukraine face a common "axis of evil".

=== Diplomatic incidents ===
In November 2022, Israel summoned Korniychuk to the Foreign Ministry to express dissatisfaction after Ukraine supported a UN resolution calling on the International Court of Justice to investigate Israel's occupation of Palestinian territories.

In December 2025, Korniychuk was again summoned by the Israeli Foreign Ministry after he publicly criticized Prime Minister Netanyahu's statements about maintaining personal ties with Russian president Vladimir Putin. Korniychuk stated that Russia was "waging a brutal war against Ukraine" and expressed surprise at Netanyahu's position, particularly given Israel's experience with the October 7, 2023, Hamas attacks. Israeli Deputy Foreign Ministry Director General Yuval Fuchs told Korniychuk that his comments were "completely unacceptable and violated diplomatic protocol".

== Legal troubles ==
In December 2010, Korniychuk was arrested on charges of exceeding his powers as First Deputy Justice Minister. The charges related to his signing of a letter that allegedly enabled the extension of a contract with the law firm Magisters, which prosecutors claimed violated procurement procedures and caused losses to the state budget. He was detained on December 22, 2010, the day his wife gave birth to their child.

Korniychuk was held in detention for 54 days before being released on February 15, 2011, under an obligation not to abscond. He was amnestied in December 2011. His arrest was widely viewed as part of a political campaign by President Viktor Yanukovych's government against supporters of Yulia Tymoshenko.

In 2018, the European Court of Human Rights ruled on Korniychuk's case (Korniychuk v. Ukraine, application no. 10042/11), examining his complaints about his arrest and detention under Article 5 of the European Convention on Human Rights.

== Personal life ==
He is the son-in-law of Vasyl Onopenko, who served as Chief Justice of Ukraine's Supreme Court.
