= Battle of Sufa =

2023 military engagement in Israel

- Part of the October 7 attacks
Date	7–10 October 2023 (3 days)
Location	Sufa, Israel 31°14′14″N 34°20′29″E
Result	Attack on the kibbutz blunted Military outpost recaptured by Israel

Belligerents
Hamas	Israel

Units involved
Izz ad-Din al-Qassam Brigades	Israel Defense Forces; (Israel) Shayetet 13; 933rd "Nahal" Brigade; LOTAR Eilat; 77th Armored Battalion; Caracal Battalion; 190 Squadron; Kibbutz Sufa security team

Strength
Dozens	30 soldiers plus reinforcements 6 armed kibbutz residents

Casualties and losses
Military outpost: 50 killed Kibbutz: 20 killed 10 captured	Military outpost: 14 soldiers killed 50 soldiers wounded Kibbutz: 2 security team members killed 1 civilian killed
- Location of Kibbutz Sufa Kibbutz Sufa (Israel)

The Battle of Sufa took place on 7 October 2023, as part of the Hamas-initiated October 7 attacks on Israel, a series of coordinated armed incursions into the Gaza envelope which marked the beginning of the Gaza war. Militants from Hamas' military wing, the Al-Qassam Brigades, attacked kibbutz Sufa and a nearby military outpost.

== Attack ==
On 7 October, 2023, Hamas launched a surprise attack on Israel at approximately 6:29 AM, firing rockets and conducting a major ground and air assault against Israeli targets around the Gaza Strip, engaging civilians and military personnel alike. Within minutes of the assault beginning, Israeli intelligence and surveillance units detected large-scale infiltrations, including in the vicinity of the kibbutz and nearby military outpost.

=== Attack on the kibbutz ===
At 6:45 AM, the security chief of kibbutz Sufa instructed the kibbutz security team to gear up and prepare to mount a defense, though he ordered its members to remain indoors for the time being. At the same time, Hamas fighters were already en route to the kibbutz in two trucks and several motorcycles. Seven minutes later, four militants arrived at the kibbut's western entrance. They killed a member of the kibbutz security team who arrived to confront them and entered the kibbutz, splitting into two squads.

According to footage captured by Hamas militants wearing GoPro cameras, militants on motorbikes indiscriminately fired guns and rocket launchers at people on the streets before arriving at the gates of Sufa. According to CNN, a militant fired shots into the town from a moving motorcycle, displaying the indiscriminate nature of the attack. Militants then climbed over the yellow front gates in what The Daily Telegraph called a coordinated maneuver, walking past an unoccupied guard post. The kibbutz had extensive defenses like barbed wire and mechanized gates. Once inside Hamas militants exchanged fire with people inside the kibbutz. In one instance, militants found an open loft hatch and shot inside. Some civilians and security personnel inside homes returned fire. Hamas gunmen then shot the tires of an ambulance found nearby. After hearing an apparent phone ring, militants shout the Hebrew word for "mother" to lure residents out of hiding. A pet dog that approached the militants was shot dead. At 7:29 AM, as the militants moved through the kibbutz, they reached the home of resident Bernard Cowan and fired into it, killing him. Five minutes later, the kibbutz security chief spotted two militants near his home and shot both of them dead. A few minutes later, he encountered and killed the remaining two militants, ending the initial attack on the kibbutz.

From 7:50 to 10:30 AM, the kibbutz security team reorganized to mount a defense of the kibbutz. At 10:30 AM, a second wave of Hamas militants arrived. Around 30 militants positioned themselves in the orchards north of the kibbutz and began firing into it. The security team and several other armed residents returned fire. During the exchange a member of the security team was critically wounded and later died. Under the cover of fire several militants managed to enter the kibbutz and hide in improvised positions, but did not reach any homes.

The first IDF reinforcements arrived at 11:53 AM, consisting of a team of six soldiers led by the deputy commander of the 80th Division and including commandos from the LOTAR Eilat special forces unit. Joined by three of the kibbutz's local defenders, they began sweeping Sufa. They were subsequently joined by the kibbutz security chief. At around 12:20 AM, they stormed a position where six Hamas militants were located and killed them all in close combat. Firing from the orchards continued until an Israeli Air Force helicopter of 190 Squadron called in by the deputy commander of the 80th Division conducted strikes, killing many of the militants and stopping the shooting at the kibbutz.

At around 2:00 PM, additional reinforcements arrived. The area was declared clear by 6:30 PM, and on the following morning Sufa's residents were evacuated. Throughout the next few days the IDF continued to sweep the area, and several militants found hiding in the orchards were killed or captured.

One Israeli civilian and two kibbutz security team members were killed in the attack on Sufa. About twenty Hamas militants were killed, and 10 were captured in the fighting. According to Israel Hayom, Israeli authorities recovered an Islamic State (IS) flag on the body of a dead militant at the kibbutz. Israel Hayom stated that, Israeli authorities stated that the militants planned to raise the flag but were killed by Israeli security forces.

=== Attack on military outpost ===
The IDF's Sufa outpost, several hundred meters from the kibbutz, was simultaneously attacked. At 6:41 AM, an IDF tank positioned near Sufa from the Vulcan Company of the 77th Armored Battalion identified infiltrating Hamas militants, many on pickup trucks and motorcycles, and opened fire. The tank held its position for three hours and killed dozens of militants, slowing the attack. The outpost was manned by soldiers of the Nahal Brigade. By 7:00 AM, the outpost, which had 30 soldiers, was under heavy fire. Around 70 Hamas fighters attacked the base. Soldiers spread out to cover the entrances while the mortar team provided cover fire. As the militants stormed the base, the outpost's defenders were pushed into the dining hall, where they continued to fight for hours. Hamas released a video of its militants storming the Sufa outpost, showing the bodies of Israeli soldiers they had killed. An armored personnel carrier carrying Nahal Brigade soldiers in the vicinity of the outpost was hit by an anti-tank missile and damaged, injuring some of the soldiers inside. Several soldiers positioned themselves to provide covering fire. At the same time, fierce fighting took place at the Dangur memorial, near the kibbutz's western gate, as a force of Nahal Brigade soldiers fought to block Hamas reinforcements. The 77th Battalion tank, which had remained in the area, patrolled around the outpost, destroying Hamas trucks and a convoy of militants on motorcycles heading for Holit. During the fighting, reinforcements from the Caracal Battalion arrived at the position of the stricken armored personnel carrier in jeeps. After providing medical aid and giving them an ammunition crate, the Caracal force split into three teams. One set off to reinforce the troops at the Dangur memorial, another took a position in orchards outside the post, and a third stayed with the armored personnel carrier. The third team attempted to break into the outpost and rescue the soldiers inside with two jeeps but failed after they came under heavy fire and retreated with one soldier wounded. After withdrawing the team subsequently engaged militants en route to Bnei Netzarim and Naveh, using machine guns and two M72 LAW rocket launchers as well as their personal weapons, managing to halt their advance.

Shayetet 13 naval commandos were sent to retake the outpost and work in conjunction with other units in the area to rescue hostages and regain control. The commandos were inserted by helicopter and linked up with the tank. The commandos, with support from the tank, then cleared the outpost of militants and took care of the wounded. During the fighting at the outpost and Dangur memorial, 14 Israeli soldiers were killed and 50 wounded. Around 50 Hamas militants were killed.

== Aftermath ==
The 227 surviving residents of the kibbutz were evacuated to hotels in Eilat. On 18 January 2024, 50 families were moved into temporary homes in Ramat Gan and 30 families were moved to Ofakim, which was also the site of a Hamas attack on 7 October.

The engagement at the military outpost in Sufa became a symbol of the Gaza war in Israel, after IDF soldiers fought and stopped the advance of Hamas militants. By mid-January 2024, the Sufa military outpost was one of 13 out of 14 outposts rehabilitated by the Technological and Logistics Directorate of the IDF.

== See also ==
- List of military engagements during the Gaza war
- Timeline of the Israeli–Palestinian conflict in 2023
- Timeline of the Gaza war (7 October 2023 – 27 October 2023)
- Outline of the Gaza war
