= Georgian Jews in Israel =

Demographic group in Israel

Total population
- 75,000–80,000

Regions with significant populations
- Lod, Bat Yam, Ashdod, Holon, Rehovot, Jerusalem and many other places.

Languages
- Hebrew (Main language for all generations); Older generation: Georgian language and Judaeo-Georgian

Religion
- Judaism

Georgian Jews in Israel, also known as Gruzinim (From Hebrew גרוזינים Gruzínim, meaning Georgians), are immigrants and descendants of the immigrants of the Georgian Jewish communities, who now reside within the state of Israel. They number around 75,000 to 80,000. The Georgian community is considered to be aligned with the Mizrahi community in Israel.

== History ==
=== Ottoman period ===
The Georgian Jews are from the times of First Temple 2600 years ago in Tbilisi.

Beginning in 1863, groups of Jews began making aliyah, mostly for religious reasons. By 1916, 439 Georgian Jews lived in Mutasarrifate of Jerusalem, mostly in Jerusalem city near the Damascus Gate. Most Georgian Jews who made aliyah were poor and worked as freight-handlers in Jerusalem.

In the course of the 1929 riots, a group of muslim Arabs stormed the Jewish neighborhood of Eshel Avraham in Jerusalem on 23 August. Many Jewish residents of the neighborhood were killed and countless buildings were set on fire. Georgian Jews accounted for around a third of the death toll in the entire city. The local Georgian synagogue burned down.

=== Israeli period ===
After the Six-Day War, huge numbers of Soviet Jews began protesting for the right to immigrate to Israel, and many applied for exit visas. Georgian Jews made up a large percentage of this number. They were among the first to begin protesting, and were among the most militant of campaigners. In August 1969, eighteen families wrote to the Human Rights Commission of the United Nations demanding permission to make aliyah. This was the first public insistence by Soviet Jews for immigration to Israel. The Israeli government and the Jewish world campaigned heavily on behalf of the plight of the Soviet Jewry. In July 1971, a group of Georgian Jews went on a hunger strike outside a Moscow post office. The determination of Soviet Jewish activists and international pressure led the Soviets to lessen their harsh anti-Jewish policies. During the 1970s, the Soviets permitted limited Jewish emigration to Israel, and about 30,000 Georgian Jews made aliyah, with thousands of others leaving for other countries. Approximately 17% of the Soviet Jewish population emigrated at this time. In 1979, the Jewish population in Georgia was 28,300 and, by 1989, it had decreased to 24,800. Thus, the community, which had numbered about 80,000 as recently as the 1970s, largely emigrated to Israel.

While most Soviet Jewish emigration was individual, Georgian Jewish emigration was communal. Due to Georgian Jewish traditions of strong, extended families and the strict, patriarchal nature of Georgian Jewish families, Georgian Jews immigrated as whole communities, with emigration of individuals causing a chain reaction leading to more emigration, and brought their community structures with them. For example, nearly the entire Jewish population of at least two Georgian towns made aliyah. At the time the emigration started, Israel had a policy of scattering the population around the country, and was experiencing a housing shortage, with the result that Georgian Jews were assigned housing in different parts of the country. The Georgian Jews began demanding that they be concentrated together, and the crisis reached a fever pitch when several families threatened to return to Georgia, and new immigrants, forewarned by predecessors, began demanding to be placed in specific areas upon arrival. Although Prime Minister Golda Meir criticized the Georgian Jews' desire to "isolate themselves into ghettos", the Israeli Immigrant Absorption Ministry eventually bowed to their demands, and began to create concentrations of around 200 families in twelve areas of the country.

In Israel, Georgian Jewish immigrants successfully integrated into society, but faced certain problems. Georgian Jewish immigrants were usually able to find jobs with ease, and often worked in light industry jobs, such as dock workers, porters, and construction workers, but faced certain issues. One major issue was religion; the Georgian Jews were often devout and had fiercely clung to their traditions in the Soviet Union, and were stunned to discover that Israeli Jews were mostly secular. As a result, Georgian Jewish immigrants demanded their own separate synagogues to continue their unique religious traditions, which the government agreed to, and enrolled their children in religious schools rather than regular schools.

In Israel, most Georgian Jews settled near the coast in cities such as Lod, Bat Yam, Ashdod, Holon and Rehovot. There are Georgian Jews in Jerusalem as well, with several prominent synagogues.

== Notable people ==
- Michael Ben David
- Yitzhak Gagula
- Efraim Gur
- Haim Megrelashvili
- Moran Mazor
- Avraham Michaeli
- Tzipi Hotovely
- Avraham Hovelashvili

== See also ==
- History of the Jews in Georgia
- Mountain Jews
- Iranian Jews in Israel
- Iraqi Jews in Israel
- Turkish Jews in Israel
- Jewish ethnic divisions
- Georgia–Israel relations
