= List of ambassadors of Israel to Georgia =

== List of ambassadors ==
- Ehud Eitam 1998 - 2001
- Rivka Cohen-Litant 2001 - 2004
- Shabtai Tsur 2005 - 2008
- Itzhak Gerberg 2008 - 2012
- Yuval Fuchs 2012 - 2016
- Shabtai Tsur 2016 -

== See also ==
- Georgia–Israel relations
