= Meir Bardugo =

- מאיר ברדוגו
- Born: 1975 (age 50–51); Jerusalem, Israel
- Occupation: Chief executive officer of the Israel Sports Betting Board

Meir Bardugo (born 1975) is an Israeli executive and media professional who has served as chief executive officer of the Israel Sports Betting Board (Toto) since April 2022. He previously held management positions at the board, served as chief of staff to Minister of Culture and Sport Limor Livnat, and worked as a journalist, including as a police correspondent for Channel 10.

== Biography ==
Bardugo was born in 1975 in Jerusalem. He began his career as a crime reporter for the Jerusalem local newspaper Kol Ha'ir, while also working as a commentator on legal and police affairs for Radio Jerusalem.

He later served as deputy editor of Yerushalayim, a local newspaper belonging to the Yedioth Tikshoret chain. In November 2005, he was appointed associate editor of Kol Ha'ir, returning to the newspaper where he had previously worked. He subsequently headed the news department of Yedioth Yerushalayim.

In 2008, Bardugo joined Channel 10's news division as its police correspondent. He held the position until August 2010, when he left the channel.

=== Ministry of Culture and Sport ===
After leaving Channel 10, Bardugo joined the office of Minister of Culture and Sport Limor Livnat. He served as the minister's spokesperson and head of her media and public information operation, and later as director of her office.

His responsibilities at the ministry also included matters relating to state ceremonies. Between 2012 and 2015, he coordinated the work of the government's interministerial committee on symbols and ceremonies and served on the public committee responsible for selecting torch-lighters for the Independence Day ceremony.

=== Positions at the Israel Sports Betting Board ===
In July 2015, Bardugo was selected through a competitive recruitment process to head the Toto board's Racer division, which was responsible for horse race betting. At the time of his appointment, Racer was one of the betting products the board sought to develop. In 2016, the board's revenue from horse race betting reached approximately NIS 504 million. Horse race betting operations were discontinued at the end of 2017 following a change in government policy and an agreement with the British operator.

He subsequently moved into regulatory affairs and business development at the board. In 2018, as Toto's director of regulatory affairs, he participated in discussions of the Knesset Finance Committee concerning the board's budget. He later served as acting vice president for regulatory affairs and business development and was involved in the board's business and strategic initiatives.

=== Chief executive officer of Toto ===
In April 2022, Bardugo was appointed chief executive officer of the Israel Sports Betting Board.

During Bardugo's tenure, the board's revenue increased, exceeding NIS 4 billion in 2025. The board estimated that it would transfer approximately NIS 900 million to the state treasury for that year, an increase of around 5% over the previous year. The board also worked to expand its online betting operations. The share of revenue generated online rose from approximately 20% in 2022 to approximately 28% in 2026.

During this period, Toto also expanded its sponsorship agreements with sports organizations. In August 2024, a sponsorship agreement with the Israeli Professional Football Leagues was approved, worth approximately NIS 40 million for the 2024–25 season. Under the agreement, the Israeli Premier League was branded "Ligat Winner".

==== Gambling regulation and policy ====
Bardugo participated in public discussions and Knesset committee hearings concerning the regulation of the gambling market, the prevention of gambling addiction, and efforts to address illegal gambling.

In January 2025, during a hearing of the Special Committee on Combating Drug and Alcohol Abuse, Bardugo discussed Toto's oversight of its retail outlets. According to Bardugo, during the three years preceding the hearing, the board had suspended 57 outlets after finding that they had sold betting slips to minors. He said that the board conducted inspections using mystery shoppers, but clarified that it did not report every violation to the police because the inspections were not designed to collect evidence for criminal proceedings. At the same hearing, he also discussed the differences between the board's regulated betting operations and the illegal gambling market.

During 2026, Bardugo called for changes to the regulation of sports betting in Israel, particularly to allow the board to offer live betting, meaning bets placed while a sporting event is in progress. He argued that restrictions on the types of bets Toto was permitted to offer made it difficult to compete with illegal betting websites. In an interview with Israel Hayom, he argued that expanding online operations would also enable the identification and monitoring of problematic gambling patterns. In the same interview, Bardugo also addressed the tension between increasing the board's revenue and its responsibility to reduce gambling-related harm. He described measures that he said the board was taking, including informing customers of their losses, identifying unusual gambling patterns, and restricting the accounts of customers at risk of addiction.

=== International recognition and certification ===
During Bardugo's tenure, the Israel Sports Betting Board continued to receive international recognition for its responsible gambling activities. In September 2022, the board received Responsible Gaming certification from European Lotteries for the fifth time. In 2025, it received the certification for the sixth consecutive time at the organization's conference in Bern, Switzerland. According to the report, Toto was one of only ten organizations in Europe to have achieved six consecutive certifications. The certification is awarded every three years following an audit that examines, among other things, customer protection mechanisms, the prevention of problem gambling, and transparency.
