= Georgia–Palestine relations =

- Georgia: Palestine

Georgia–Palestine relations refers to relations between Georgia and the State of Palestine.

== History ==
Since 25 April 1992, Georgia has recognized the state of Palestine, which was proclaimed in 1988, and the two nations enjoy diplomatic ties since then.

The Georgian government did not participate in the UNESCO vote on Palestine's admission. Georgia voted in support of giving Palestine UN non-member observer status. "Georgia is geographically adjacent to the Middle East and supports the creation of the State of Palestine", Tbilisi stated when explaining the nation's position in the General Assembly.

== See also ==
- Foreign relations of Georgia
- Foreign relations of Palestine
- Monastery of the Cross
- Georgia–Israel relations
