= Georgian Jews =

Jewish ethnic group

Georgian Jews ქართველი ებრაელები
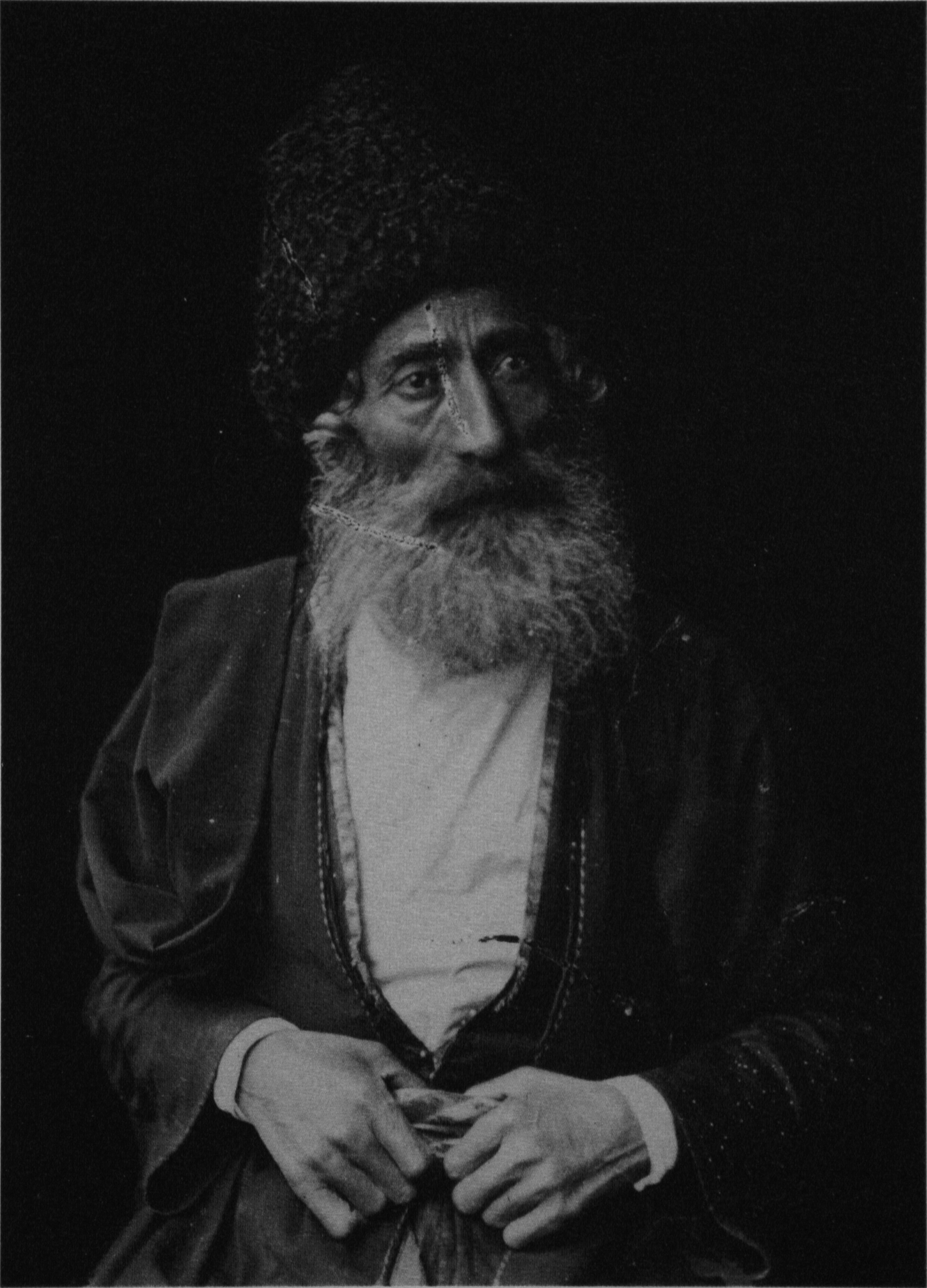
- A Jew from Akhaltsikhe, photo by Dmitri Yermakov, ca 1860s-1890s

Total population
- 78,000

Regions with significant populations
- Israel: 65,000
- United States: 10,000
- Georgia: 1,405 (not including Abkhazia or South Ossetia)
- Belgium: 1,200
- Austria: 800
- Azerbaijan: 500
- Russia: 14

Languages
- Hebrew, Georgian (Judaeo-Georgian), English, Russian

Religion
- Judaism

Related ethnic groups
- Georgians, Iraqi Jews, Iranian Jews, Bukharian Jews, Kurdish Jews, Mountain Jews, Soviet Jews

Georgian Jews (Georgian: ქართველი ებრაელები, romanized: kartveli ebraelebi, Hebrew: יְהוּדִי גֵּאוֹרְגְּיָה, romanized: Yehudei Georgia) are a community of Jews who are thought to have migrated into Georgia during the Babylonian captivity in the 6th century BCE. It is one of the oldest communities in the region. As a result of a major emigration wave in the 1990s, the vast majority of Georgian Jews now live in Israel, with the world's largest community living in the city of Ashdod, although many also live in the United States.

Georgian Jews should be distinguished from the Ashkenazi Jews in Georgia, who arrived following the Russian annexation of Georgia, as well as from the neighboring Mountain Jews (მთის ებრაელები, mtis ebraelebi), who are considered ethnically and culturally distinct from the kartveli ebraelebi. Prior to Georgia's annexation by Russia in 1801, the 2300-year history of Georgian Jews was marked by few traces of antisemitism and by an assimilation in the Georgian language and culture.

== History ==
The Georgian Jews traditionally lived separately, not only from the surrounding Georgian people, but also from the Ashkenazi Jews in Tbilisi, who had different practices and language.

The community, which numbered almost 60,000 as recently as the 1970s, has largely emigrated to Israel, the United States, the Russian Federation and Belgium (in Antwerp). As of 2014, only about 1,500 Georgian Jews remained in Georgia. According to the 2002 First General National Census of Georgia, there are 3,541 Jewish believers in the country. For example, the Lezgishvili branch of Georgian Jews have families in Israel, Moscow, Baku, Düsseldorf, and Cleveland, Ohio (US). Several hundred Georgian Jewish families live in the New York tri-state area, particularly in New York City and Long Island.

=== Origins ===
Georgian-speaking Jewry is one of the oldest surviving Jewish communities in the world, although there are different accounts to how long they have lived in present-day Georgia, and what motivated their migration. By some accounts, Georgian Jews, also known as Gurjim or kartveli ebraelebi, have an approximately 2,600-year history in Colchis, but their origin is debated. The most widely held view is that the first Jews made their way to southern Georgia after Nebuchadnezzar's conquest of Jerusalem in 586 BCE and exile in Babylon.

The post-exile origin view is espoused by the medieval Georgian historian Leonti Mroveli, who wrote in the 11th Century:

Then King Nebuchadnezzar captured Jerusalem. The Jews who fled thence come to Kartli and requested from the mamasakhlisi [local ruler] of Mtskheta territory in return for tribute. He gave [a place] and settled them on the Aragvi, at spring which was called Zanavi, which was later renamed as Zanavi, the quarter of Jews."

According to Mroveli, a further settlement of the Jews in Georgia was during the Roman period of Emperor Vespasian. He wrote that Jews lived in Georgia long before 1st century AD. According to Mroveli:

During their [Bartom and Kartam's] reign, Vespasian, the emperor of the Romans, captured Jerusalem. From there refugee Jews come to Mtskheta and settled with the old Jews."

The ancient Georgian historic chronicle, The Conversion of Kartli, is the oldest and only Georgian source concerning the history of the Jewish community in Georgia. The chronicle describes a version similar to that offered centuries later by Leonti Mroveli, but the period of Jewish migration into Georgia is ascribed to Alexander the Great:

...the warlike seed, the Honni [Jews], exiled by the Chaldeans, [came to Kartli] and requested the land for tribute from the Lord of the Bun T'urks [suburb of Mtskheta]. And they [Jews] settled in Zanavi. And they possessed it...

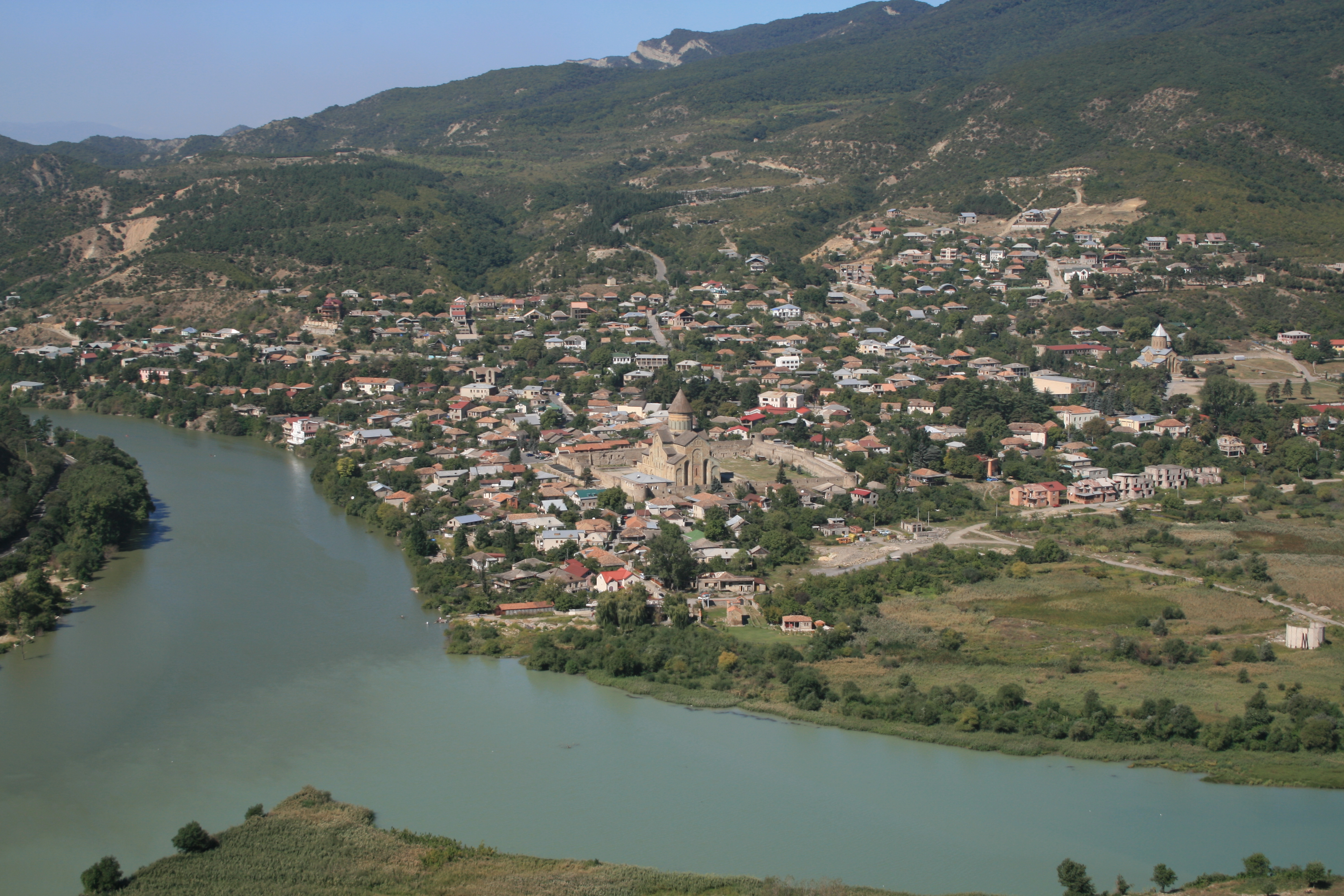
The ancient Georgian capital of Mtskheta, where Jews lived for thousands of years

Georgian sources also refer to the arrival of the first Jews in Western Georgia from the Byzantine Empire during the 6th century AD. Approximately 3,000 of the Jews fled to Eastern Georgia, which by that time was controlled by the Persians, to escape severe persecution by the Byzantines. The existence of the Jews in these regions during this period is supported by the archaeological evidence, which shows that Jews lived in Mtskheta, the ancient capital of the Eastern Georgian state of Iberia-Kartli.

According to the Georgian hagiography, Jewish communities existed in Georgia in the 1st century. A Georgian Jew called Elias was said to be in Jerusalem during the Crucifixion and brought Jesus' robe back with him to Georgia. He had acquired it from a Roman soldier at Golgotha.

The Jews spoke Georgian, and later Jewish traders developed a dialect called Kivruli, or Judaeo-Georgian, which included a number of Hebrew words.

In the second half of the 7th century, the Muslim Empire conquered extensive Georgian territory, which became a province of the Arab caliphate. Arab emirs ruled in the Georgian capital Tbilisi and surrounding territory for nearly 500 years, until 1122.

Genetic studies carried out on Georgian Jews as part of a wider survey showed close genetic links with other Jews, and in particular with Iraqi and Persian Jews. This seemed to prove the historical accounts of Jewish migration from Persia into Georgia.

=== Middle Ages ===
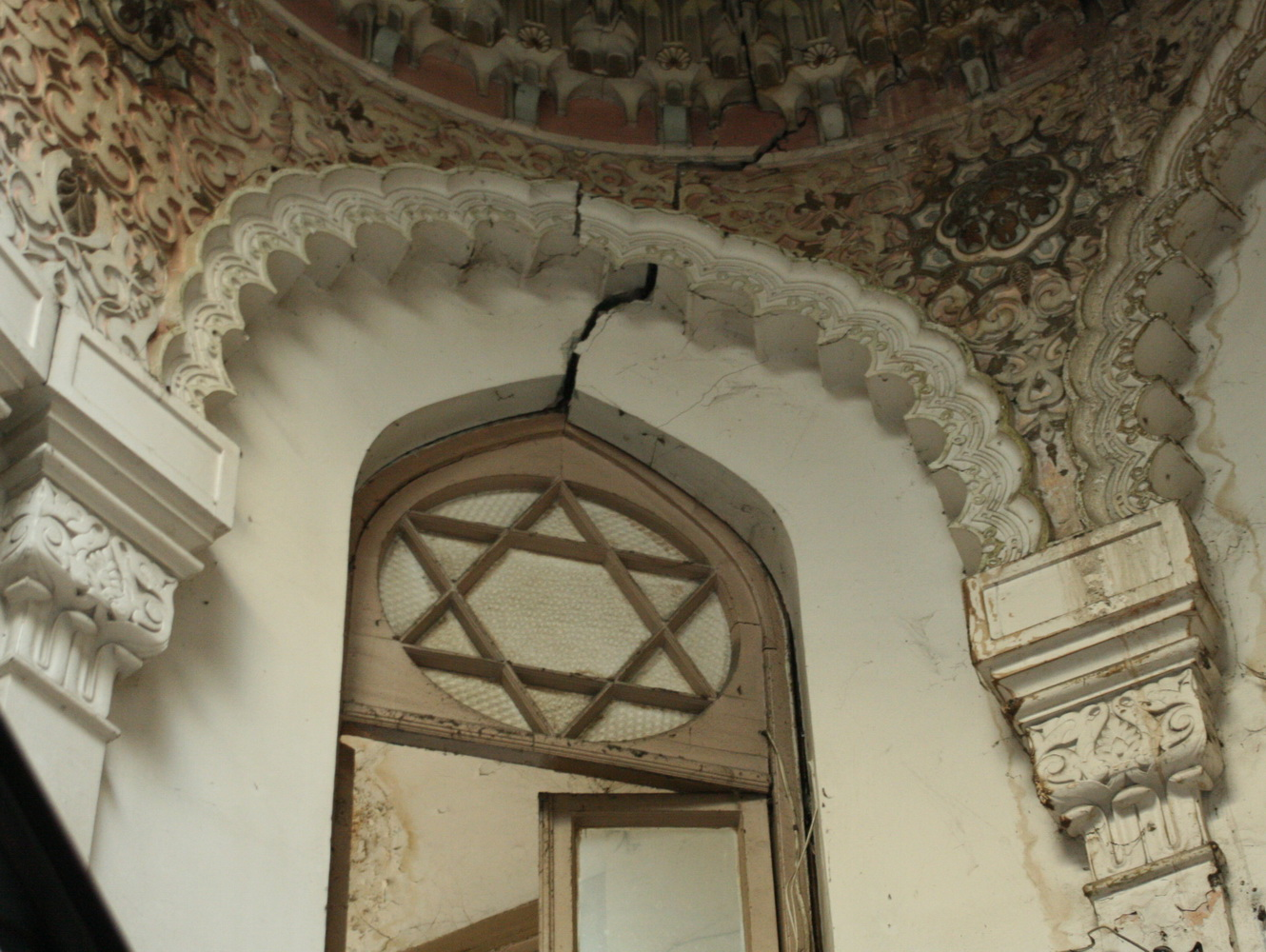
Interior of a Jewish house in Tbilisi

There is not much documentation about Georgian Jews under the Arab domination. In the late 9th century, Abu-Imran Musa al-Za'farani (later known as Abu-Imran al-Tiflisi) founded a Jewish Karai sect called the Tiflis Sect ("Tiflisites"), which lasted for more than 300 years. The sect deviated from Rabbinic halakhah in its marriage and kashrut customs. This sect did not represent the great majority of Georgian Jews, who adhered to traditional Rabbinic Judaism while maintaining strong religious ties with Baghdad and other Jews of Iraq. The nature of Georgian Jew's observance to rabbinic law was also noted by Benjamin of Tudela and Abraham ben David (also known as the RABAD or RAVAD).

=== Georgia under Russian Empire ===
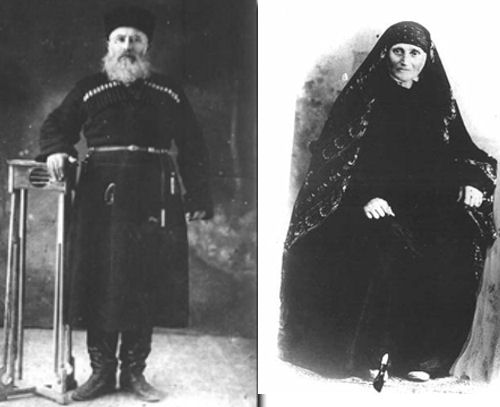
Georgian Jews of Tbilisi, c. 1900

The tradition of the relationship between Jews and other Georgians has no signs of antisemitism, excluding the Tsarist government. For many centuries, "the Church in Georgia" (Georgian Orthodox Church) did not incite against the Jews, and the Georgian Jews were visibly assimilated in the country's rural life and culture.

=== Soviet Georgia ===
After the Six-Day War, huge numbers of Soviet Jews began protesting for the right to immigrate to Israel, and many applied for exit visas. Georgian Jews experienced a surge in Jewish pride and wished to make Aliyah to Israel.

While most Soviet Jewish emigration was individual, Georgian-Jewish emigration was communal. Due to Georgian-Jewish traditions of strong, extended families and the strict, patriarchal nature of Georgian families, Georgians immigrated as whole communities, with emigration of individuals causing a chain reaction leading to more emigration, and brought their community structures with them. For example, nearly the entire population of at least two Georgian towns made aliyah. At the time the emigration started, Israel had a policy of scattering the population around the country, and was experiencing a housing shortage, with the result that Georgians were assigned housing in different parts of the country. The Georgians began demanding that they be concentrated together, and the crisis reached a fever pitch when several families threatened to return to Georgia, and new immigrants, forewarned by predecessors, began demanding to be placed in specific areas upon arrival. Although Prime Minister Golda Meir criticized the Georgians' desire to "isolate themselves into ghettos", the Israeli Immigrant Absorption Ministry eventually bowed to their demands, and began to create concentrations of around 200 families in twelve areas of the country.

In Israel, Georgian immigrants successfully integrated into society, but faced certain problems. Georgian immigrants were usually able to find jobs with ease, and often worked in light industry jobs, such as dock workers, porters, and construction workers, but faced certain issues. One major issue was religion; the Georgian Jews were often devout and had fiercely clung to their traditions in the Soviet Union, and were stunned to discover that Israeli Jews were mostly secular. As a result, Georgian immigrants demanded their own separate synagogues to continue their unique religious traditions, which the government agreed to, and enrolled their children in religious schools rather than regular schools.

Many Georgian Jews now live in Israel, estimated at 75,000 people. In Israel, most Georgian Jews settled near the coast in cities such as Lod, Bat Yam, Ashdod, and Holon. There are Georgian Jews in Jerusalem as well, with several prominent synagogues.

=== 21 century ===
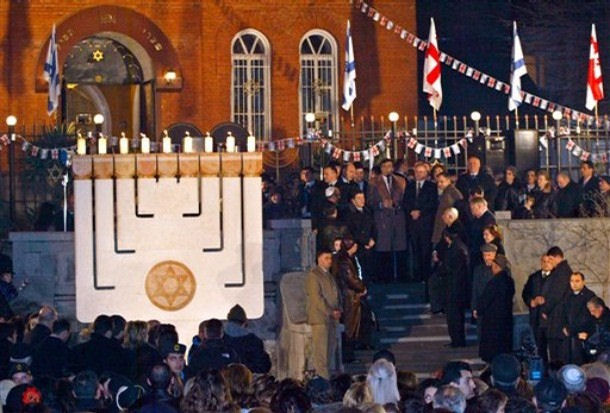
Israel's 60th independence day celebration in Tbilisi, Georgia, attended by Georgian President Mikheil Saakashvili

As a result of the 2008 South Ossetia War, some 200 Georgian Jews immigrated to Israel with assistance from the Jewish Agency.

== Demographics ==
According to the 1897 Russian Empire Census, there were 12,194 people whose native language was "Jewish" in the two provinces that largely covered today's Georgia: Tiflis Governorate (5,188) and Kutais Governorate (7,006). There were 3,419 Jews in Kutaisi city (10.5% of the population), 2,935 in Tiflis, 1,064 in Batumi.

Georgia's population almost doubled between 1926 and 1970, then began declining, with dramatic declines in the 1970s and 1990s, when many Georgian Jews left and moved to other countries, especially to Israel.

Historical Georgian Jewish population
Year	Pop.	±%
1897	12,747	—
1897	12,194	−4.3%
1926	30,534	+150.4%
1939	42,300	+38.5%
1959	51,589	+22.0%
1970	55,398	+7.4%
1979	28,315	−48.9%
1989	24,834	−12.3%
2014	1,405	−94.3%
Source: The Jewish population data includes Mountain Jews, Georgian Jews, Bukharan Jews (or Central Asian Jews), Krymchaks (all per the 1959 Soviet census), and Tats.

== Language ==
The traditional language of the Georgian Jews is Judaeo-Georgian, a variant of Georgian, characterized by a large number of Hebrew loanwords, and written using either the Georgian alphabet or Hebrew alphabet.

== Aliyah and diaspora outside of Georgia ==
=== Notable people in the US ===
In the United States, the principal Georgian Jewish synagogue is the Congregation of Georgian Jews in the Forest Hills neighborhood of Queens, New York City.

- Tamir Sapir, born Temur Sepiashvili, an immigrant New York taxi driver turned businessman and philanthropist
- Dr. Yuri Busi, born Yuri Busiashvili, who was known for being the physician for the actress Lucille Ball
- Temur Yakobashvili, Georgian-Jewish political scientist, ex diplomat, and politician, currently residing in the U.S.

=== Notable people in Israel ===
- Rivka Michaeli, actress
- Mikhael Mirilashvili (born 1960), businessman and philanthropist based in St Petersburg and Israel
- Elmira Nazirova (1928–2014), composer
- Tzipi Hotovely, diplomat and ambassador of Israel to the United Kingdom
- Yitzchak Mirilashvili (born 1984), son and business partner of Mikhael Mirilashvili
- Avraham Hovelashvili (1997–2023), deputy commander of Caracal Battalion
- Aharon Jacobashvili (born 1964), Olympic boxer

=== Notable people in Hungary ===
- Antal Yaakobishvili (born 2004), footballer at Girona FC
- Áron Yaakobishvili (born 2006), footballer at FC Barcelona

== See also ==
- Georgia–Israel relations
- Georgian Jews in Israel
