= Kol Ha'ir =

Israeli periodical

- Type: Weekly newspaper
- Owner: Schocken Group
- Founded: 1979
- Language: Hebrew
- Country: Israel
- Website: www.kolhair.co.il

Kol Ha'ir (Hebrew: כל העיר, lit The Whole City, also a homophone for Voice of the City) is a local Hebrew-language weekly published in Jerusalem.

== History ==
Kol Ha'ir has been published by the Schocken Group since 1978, setting the stage for the founding of local newspapers in other cities throughout Israel. Since its inception, the paper has maintained an independent editorial board despite its association with Haaretz. It was launched by Amos Schocken, whose father, Gershom Schocken, was then editor in chief of Haaretz.

In November 2005, Elad Lifshitz was appointed editor of the newspaper, with Meir Bardugo appointed associate editor.

== See also ==
- List of Israeli newspapers
