= Georgia–Israel relations =

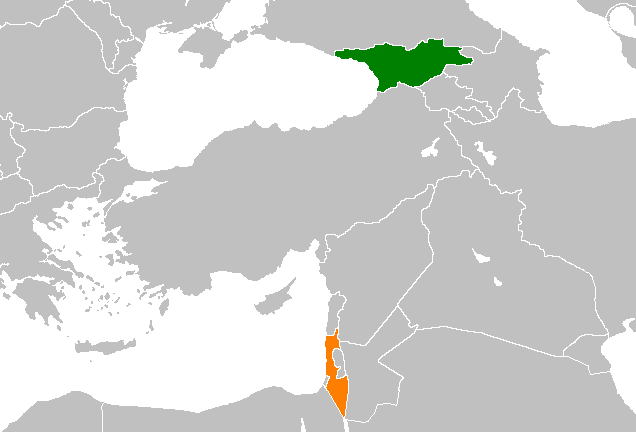
- Georgia: Israel

Georgia–Israel relations are diplomatic, commercial and cultural ties between Georgia and Israel. Diplomatic relations were formally established on June 1, 1992, alongside establishing diplomatic relations with the US. Georgia has an embassy in Tel Aviv and a consulate in Jerusalem. Israel has an embassy in Tbilisi.

== History ==
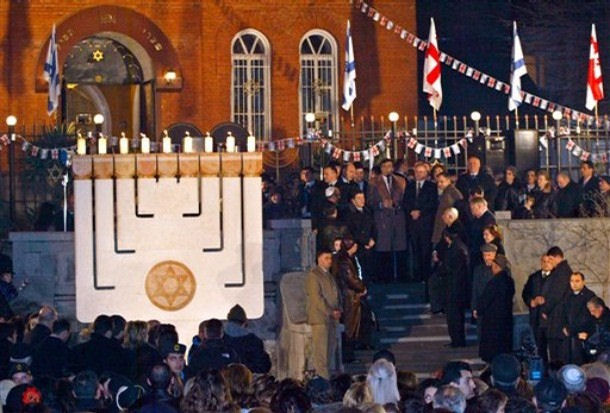
Marking Israel's 60th anniversary in Tbilisi

The 1922 census of Palestine lists 4 Georgian speakers in Mandatory Palestine (all in Jerusalem-Jaffa), but lists 6 Georgian speakers within municipal areas (4 in Jerusalem and 2 in Hebron). The reason for the discrepancy is unknown.

There are 120,000 Georgian Jews living in Israel, as well as 13,000 in Georgia.

During the 2008 Russo-Georgian war, the Israeli Ministry of Foreign Affairs stated that Israel "recognized the territorial integrity of Georgia and called for a peaceful solution." On 15 August 2008, Israelis demonstrated in Tel Aviv in support of Georgia by forming a human chain and demanding that the Israeli government increase its support for Georgia.

In the years leading up to the war, Israel had sold a significant amount of military equipment to Georgia, including Elbit drones (4 of which were shot down by Russia in the 2008 war), Rafael anti-tank missiles, Ta'as mortar and ammunition, and Soviet-made equipment captured from Arab armies. In the buildup to the war it was feared that this would anger Russia and cause it to retaliate by sending advanced systems to its allies in Iran and Syria, which could end in the hands of Hezbollah. In February 2008 the sale of weapons and offensive equipment to Georgia was banned by the Israeli government, freezing a sale of Merkava tanks to Georgia. On August 10, following the outbreak of the war, the Foreign Ministry even recommended to the Defense Ministry to ban all sales of any military equipment to Georgia.

Following the war, Israeli entrepreneurs represented the biggest share of investors helping to rebuild destroyed infrastructure, receiving 35% of all Georgian government contracts as of January 2009.

In 2012, Archil (Abesalom) Kekelia was appointed Georgian ambassador to Israel. His two major missions are to regain a foothold in the Monastery of the Cross in Jerusalem, which was taken over by the Greek Orthodox church 300 years ago, and promote economic ties with Israel.

On 20 November 2012, during the IDF's Operation Pillar of Defense in the Gaza Strip, there was a large demonstration in support of Israel in the Georgian capital of Tbilisi.

=== Israeli Embassy Criticism of Tbilisi’s Iran Commemoration ===
On 11 February 2026, the Tbilisi TV Tower was illuminated in the colors of the Iranian flag to mark the anniversary of the 1979 Islamic Revolution, and a reception dedicated to the national day of the Islamic Republic of Iran was held at the Paragraph Hotel in Tbilisi, owned by Georgian oligarch Bidzina Ivanishvili.

The event was attended by Georgia’s Deputy Minister of Foreign Affairs, Lasha Darsalia, upon his return to Georgia from the United States. Darsalia congratulated Iran on behalf of the Georgian government and highlighted the historical ties and cooperation between the two countries. The Israeli Embassy in Georgia criticized the participation of Georgian authorities and the illumination of the tower, condemning Iran’s government as a repressive regime and questioning the message such actions send to the region, the international community, and Iranian citizens advocating for freedom and democracy. The text of Darsalia’s remarks was circulated by the Iranian ambassador to Georgia.

== Economic and tourism cooperation ==
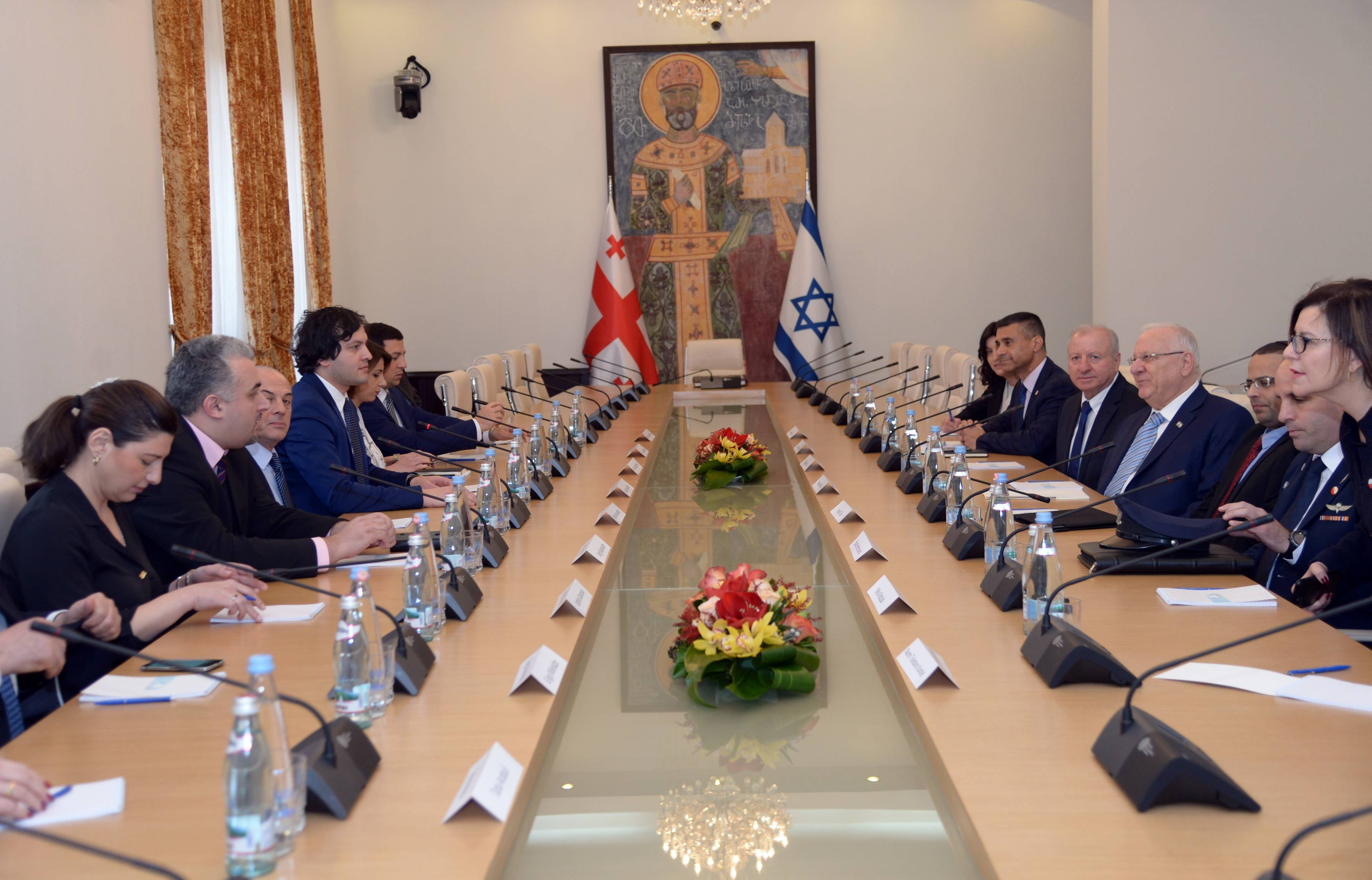
Reuven Rivlin and Irakli Kobakhidze work meeting, 2017

The non-governmental Israel-Georgia Chamber of Commerce was established in 1996 to support the growth of bilateral commercial, tourism and cultural relations.

In 2010, Israel and Georgia signed bilateral agreements in the sphere of tourism and air traffic. In October 2010, Georgian Economy and Sustainable Development Minister Vera Kobalia visited Israel.

Israeli backpackers began visiting Georgia in the 1990s and Georgia has become a popular destination for Israelis due to its proximity, cultural ties and relative inexpensiveness. In 2017, over 115,000 Israelis visited Georgia.

In 2023, relations between Jerusalem and Tbilisi were reportedly at their peak. Georgia supports important votes for Israel at the UN, and the two countries are planning to establish a free trade zone.

=== Trade statistics ===
Israel - Georgia trade in millions USD-$
| | Israel imports Georgia exports | Georgia imports Israel exports | Total trade value |
|---|---|---|---|
| 2023 | 23.6 | 35.8 | 59.4 |
| 2022 | 27.7 | 32.3 | 60 |
| 2021 | 24.8 | 17.7 | 42.5 |
| 2020 | 20.1 | 23.3 | 43.4 |
| 2019 | 14.7 | 27.6 | 42.3 |
| 2018 | 9.6 | 19.2 | 28.8 |
| 2017 | 7.1 | 30.4 | 37.5 |
| 2016 | 6.1 | 19.8 | 25.9 |
| 2015 | 5.8 | 26.9 | 32.7 |
| 2014 | 4.2 | 113.4 | 117.6 |
| 2013 | 2.2 | 65.7 | 67.9 |
| 2012 | 34.1 | 95.5 | 129.6 |
| 2011 | 36.4 | 45.5 | 81.9 |
| 2010 | 1.5 | 43.9 | 45.4 |
| 2009 | 1.9 | 35 | 36.9 |
| 2008 | 2 | 132 | 134 |
| 2007 | 2.3 | 54.1 | 56.4 |
| 2006 | 0.8 | 16.3 | 17.1 |
| 2005 | 1 | 7.6 | 8.6 |
| 2004 | 1 | 5.5 | 6.5 |
| 2003 | 0.7 | 2.4 | 3.1 |
| 2002 | 0.8 | 1.3 | 2.1 |

=== Tourism statistics ===
Georgia is a popular travel destination for Israeli tourists. Israeli tourists are one of the largest contributors to Georgia's tourism sector, constistently ranking among the top 10 countries for visitor arrivals. In 2023, 217,000 Israeli tourist visited Georgia, making them the fourth largest foreign visitor group, after tourists from Russia (1,418,464), Turkey (1,396,660), and Armenia (962,540). This makes Israeli tourists the largest Georgian tourist group from a non-border sharing nation.

Tourism of Georgians in Israel and Israelis in Georgia
| | 2023 | 2022 | 2021 | 2020 | 2019 | 2018 |
|---|---|---|---|---|---|---|
| Tourists form Israel Arriving to Georgia | 217,065 | 210,178 | 100,686 | 25,731 | 205,051 | 156,922 |
| Tourists from Georgia Arriving to Israel | 9,000 | 6,700 | 1,100 | 1,900 | 8,300 | 9,300 |

== Military cooperation ==
Israel has engaged in extensive military cooperation with Georgia. Israel sold Georgia armored vehicles and small arms, and Israeli special forces and private contractors have trained Georgian troops. Israel sold Georgia its fleet of UAVs, LAR-160 rocket launchers, anti-tank mines, and cluster bombs. On 5 August 2008, it was reported by Stratfor and Russia Today that Israel planned to halt all arms sales to Georgia due to Russian "barely hidden threats", as worded by Russia Today. This was denied at the time by Georgian State Minister for Reintegration Temur Iakobashvili. Israel continued to train Georgian security forces, though on a more limited scale.

A Georgian delegation including Georgian Prime Minister Bidzina Ivanishvili and Defense Minister Irakli Alasania visited Israel in June 2013 with an apparent intention to renew military cooperation and acquire defensive weapons such as drones and anti-tank and anti-aircraft missiles.

In 2018, the two countries signed counterterrorism and cybersecurity cooperation agreements.

== Resident diplomatic missions ==
- Georgia has an embassy in Tel Aviv.
- Israel has an embassy in Tbilisi.

== See also ==
- Foreign relations of Georgia
- Foreign relations of Israel
- International recognition of Israel
- History of the Jews in Georgia
- Georgian Jews in Israel
- List of ambassadors of Israel to Georgia (country)
- Georgia–Palestine relations
