= Israel Sports Betting Board =

- המועצה להסדר ההימורים בספורט

Agency overview
- Formed: Betting operation: 1957; Statutory board: 1 January 1968
- Jurisdiction: Israel
- Annual budget: 2024: Revenue: NIS 3.87 billion Prizes: NIS 2.6 billion Profit transferred to the state: over NIS 850 million
- Agency executives: Meir Bardugo, Chief executive officer; Shabtai Tsur, Chair
- Parent department: Ministry of Culture and Sport and Ministry of Finance
- Website: www.winner.co.il

A blank Sportoto betting slip for the fifth round of Israel's top football divisions in the 1969–70 season

The Israel Sports Betting Board, commonly known as Toto, is a statutory corporation operating under the Sports Betting Regulation Law, 5727–1967, and authorized to organize and conduct betting on the results of sporting matches and competitions in Israel. The board operates betting schemes under the Winner brand.

Its origins lie in the football betting operations established in Israel during the 1950s. The board was established under legislation enacted in 1967 and began operating in January 1968. Until the end of 2018, its profits were used to support sports organizations and the construction of sports facilities; since 2019, its profits have been transferred to the state treasury.

== History ==
In German, "Toto" is a term for sports betting and an abbreviation of "Totalisator". The name was also used for the Intertoto Cup, a summer tournament sponsored by European football pools organizations.

Football betting in Israel was first operated by the newspaper Sport Israel, which published a prediction form covering 12 matches on 14 August 1951 under the name "Nachshon". The form was published on Mondays, and readers were asked to cut it out and send it to the newspaper's offices in Tel Aviv by Thursday. Hundreds of bettors participated in the first week. In June 1955, a committee headed by Yitzhak Ben-Aharon and Shalom Zisman, established to examine ways of improving young people's physical fitness, recommended that the government establish "Sportoto" along the lines of European football pools, with the proceeds used to fund sports development. Initially, however, Mifal HaPayis and the Ministry of Finance opposed the establishment of a competing lottery operation, arguing that the Israeli market was too small.

Sportoto, as it was then known, was established in December 1957, at the beginning of the 1957–58 football season. Betting slips were sent by post together with the entry fee, which was then 250 prutot for every two entries. In the first week, 5,198 people participated, and the first prize was 1,000 Israeli pounds. Two sports betting ventures subsequently merged: a commercial operation whose partners included the Mozes family, and an operation run by the Maccabi and Hapoel sports associations to raise funds through sports betting. Gesher, a company owned by the Mozes family, remained involved in Toto's operations until 1986.

The Sports Betting Regulation Law was enacted in August 1967, and the board began operating under it on 1 January 1968. The law authorized the board to organize and conduct betting on the results of sporting matches and competitions, and stipulated that revenue remaining after the payment of prizes and the board's expenses would be used to promote physical education and sport in Israel.

In 1971, the Etzioni Commission, a state commission of inquiry, was established to investigate suspected football match-fixing. Its recommendations also addressed the board's operations: the commission recommended severing the board's organizational ties with sports organizations and changing its composition, and identified shortcomings in the oversight of funds transferred to the central sports organizations. A report published by the State Comptroller in 1988 noted that the recommendation to change the board's composition had not yet been implemented at the time of the audit.

Initially, bettors were required to predict the results of only 12 matches correctly, but the number increased over the years. In January 1999, it rose to 16 matches. In August 2010, Toto decided to reduce the requirement to 15 matches, but the number returned to 16 after one season.

In October 2000, the Knesset Finance Committee approved new regulations allowing the board to process bets in real time through terminals at betting outlets connected to a central computer, replacing paper forms. Shortly afterwards, in March 2001, the committee also approved daily betting and new games using betting methods similar to those employed by British bookmakers. The regulations permitted daily betting on football and basketball matches and competitions, as well as on other sports. They covered betting at fixed or variable odds, with participants choosing their stakes and, consequently, the size of their potential prizes.

On 20 March 2002, the board launched "Winner", later known as "Winner Line", as a daily sports betting scheme. Winner initially offered relatively small stakes, ranging from NIS 10 to NIS 1,210 per slip, and potential winnings of up to NIS 250,000. It covered 60 football and basketball matches in Israeli leagues, European leagues and European cup competitions. At the time, the board stated that its aim was to provide an alternative to illegal online sports betting in Israel, which was then estimated to total NIS 1 billion annually.

== Organization ==
The Israel Sports Betting Board is a public body operating under the Sports Betting Regulation Law, 5727–1967. It is subject to scrutiny by the State Comptroller. Its budget requires approval from the Minister of Culture and Sport, the Minister of Finance and the Knesset Finance Committee. The board operates as a statutory government monopoly in sports betting.

The board of directors consists of 13 members: seven public representatives, three representatives of the Ministry of Culture and Sport, two representatives of the Ministry of Finance and one representative of the Ministry of Welfare and Social Affairs. Ministry representatives are appointed by their respective ministers, while public representatives are appointed by the Minister of Culture and Sport following consultation with the National Sports Council. The chair and deputy chair are appointed from among board members who are not civil servants. As a general rule, members serve three-year terms.

The board's chair is Shabtai Tsur, who was appointed in December 2020, and its chief executive officer is Meir Bardugo, who was appointed in April 2022.

=== Membership in international organizations ===
The board is a member of the World Lottery Association (WLA) and European Lotteries (EL).

=== Regulation and responsible gaming ===
In 2022, the board received European Lotteries' responsible gaming certification for the fifth time. According to the board, the certification was renewed for the sixth time in 2025. The board is also listed as holding Level 4 certification under the World Lottery Association's responsible gaming framework.

According to the board's report on its activities in 2025, measures to protect participants included personal account activity reports, questionnaires to identify the risk of gambling addiction, account closures following questionnaire findings, staff training and checks at betting outlets to prevent sales to minors.

=== Distribution network ===
- Toto outlets – The board distributes its betting products through outlets throughout Israel. Outlet owners are independent operators working under a franchising model. Franchisees receive training, professional support and continuing instruction from the board.
- Website – The board allows customers to submit Winner betting slips online. It launched its website in 2004. In 2021, website revenue accounted for approximately 21.5% of the board's total revenue. In 2025, online sales totaled approximately NIS 1.1 billion, accounting for approximately 28% of sales turnover.

== Betting schemes ==
=== Sports betting ===
The board offers sports betting under the Winner brand. Its products include bets with odds determined when the bet is placed, as well as prediction games in which prize amounts depend on the number of winners. The best-known prediction game is "Toto 16", in which participants must correctly predict the results of 16 matches to win the first prize. Betting covers sports including football, basketball, tennis and handball.

The betting schemes include daily sports betting, primarily on football and basketball matches, and a weekly prediction game. In 2020, daily Winner games accounted for approximately 98% of the board's revenue.

=== Horse racing betting ===
In 2013, the board began operating a betting scheme on horse racing in the United Kingdom under the name Racer. Revenue from horse racing betting reached NIS 387 million in 2015.

In August 2016, Finance Minister Moshe Kahlon announced his intention to abolish horse racing betting.

In December 2017, following the recommendations of a committee established to examine the issue, Kahlon announced that horse racing betting in Israel would cease on 1 January 2018.

== Scale of operations ==
In 2023, Toto's revenue totaled approximately NIS 3.5 billion, of which approximately NIS 2.3 billion was distributed to participants as prizes. Profits transferred to the state treasury totaled approximately NIS 800 million.

In 2024, the board's revenue totaled NIS 3.87 billion, prizes paid to the public amounted to approximately NIS 2.6 billion, and profits transferred to the state exceeded NIS 850 million.

According to figures released by the board in January 2026, its revenue in 2025 totaled NIS 4.009 billion, while prizes paid to the public totaled NIS 2.73 billion. The same publication estimated that profits to be transferred to the state would amount to approximately NIS 900 million.

Alongside the board's operations, Israel has an illegal gambling market. An article published in Calcalist in June 2026 cited an estimate that Israel's unregulated gambling market exceeded NIS 30 billion annually. This estimate covered the entire unregulated gambling market, rather than sports betting alone.

== Allocation of funds ==
The Sports Betting Regulation Law stipulates that payments to winners must amount to at least 60% of the board's turnover, and that payments to winners in any individual betting scheme must amount to at least 42% of that scheme's receipts.

Until the end of 2018, revenue remaining after the payment of prizes and the board's expenses was used to promote sport in Israel. The board funded organizations and teams, contributed to the financing of stadiums, arenas and sports facilities throughout the country, and supported Olympic sport. Allocations served, among others, the following purposes:

- Grants to sports unions, associations and teams, allocated according to established funding criteria.
- Grants for the construction of stadiums and sports facilities, and for infrastructure and sporting equipment, distributed through the facilities fund. Some allocations supported the purchase of equipment and training aids for Olympic sport.

In 1989, a review committee chaired by Aharon Yadlin recommended changing the distribution of Toto funds so that each club would receive funding directly according to the scale of its activities, rather than through the central sports organizations. In March 2014, the Knesset approved an amendment initiated by Culture and Sport Minister Limor Livnat, providing for support payments to be transferred directly to teams rather than through the central sports organizations, unions and associations. The amendment took effect on 1 January 2015.

In 2015, the board invested approximately NIS 284 million in the construction of sports facilities, including Turner Stadium and the basketball arena in Holon.

Since 2019, profits remaining after the payment of prizes and operating expenses have been transferred to the state treasury. Sports funding is provided through the state budget, rather than through the direct distribution of the board's profits to sports organizations. The board also enters into marketing and operational agreements with sports organizations, subject to statutory restrictions.

== Officeholders ==
=== Chairs ===
Name	Term	Notes and sources
Moshe Sanbar	1967–1968	First chair.
Yoram Roin	1968–1969	
Yosef Inbar	1969–1972	
Amiram Sivan	1972–1974	
Ben-Ami Zuckerman	1974–1982	
Azriel Waldman	1982–1985	
Aryeh Ze'ev	1985–1989	First term.
Adi Eldar	1989	
Boaz Appelbaum	1989–1990	
Aryeh Ze'ev	1990–1998	Subsequent term.
Roni Bar-On	1998–2001	
Yom-Tov Samia	2001–2004	
Gideon Brickman	2005–2009	
Tzachi Fishbein	2009–2015	
Itzik Larry	2015–2016	Acting chair following the death of Tzachi Fishbein.
Yossi Filus	2016–2019	
Ofra Sharon	2019–2020	Acting chair.
Shabtai Tsur	2020–present	

=== Chief executive officers ===
The following is a partial list of the board's chief executive officers and acting chief executive officers:

Name	Term or documented period in office	Notes and sources
Yitzhak Feinberg	1989–1990	
Elkana Efrati	1991–1993	
Shaul Swiri	1993–2002	
Yitzhak Shani	2002	Acting CEO.
Shaul Schneider	2003–2007	
Gideon Brickman	2007–2008	Acting CEO.
Ofer Peri	2008–2011	
Itzik Larry	2011–2019	Acting CEO from 2011; appointed permanent CEO in April 2012.
Yael Elmor-Leon	2019–2022	Acting CEO.
Meir Bardugo	2022–present	

== See also ==
- Toto Cup
- Taxation of gambling, lotteries and prize-winning activities
