= Shabtai Tsur =

Israeli politician, public official and diplomat

- שבתאי צור
- Tsur in 2019

Acting Mayor of Ashkelon
- In office 2003–2003
- Preceded by: Benny Vaknin
- Succeeded by: Roni Mahatzri

Leader of the Opposition in the Ashkelon City Council
- In office 2003–2004

Israeli Ambassador to Georgia
- In office 2004–2008

Chairman of the Israel Sports Betting Board
- Incumbent
- Assumed office December 2020

Israeli Ambassador to Georgia
- In office 2016–2020

Personal details
- Born: Shota Tsotsiashvili; 15 February 1951 (age 75) Vani, Georgian Soviet Socialist Republic, Soviet Union
- Party: Likud
- Spouse: Leah Tsur
- Children: 2

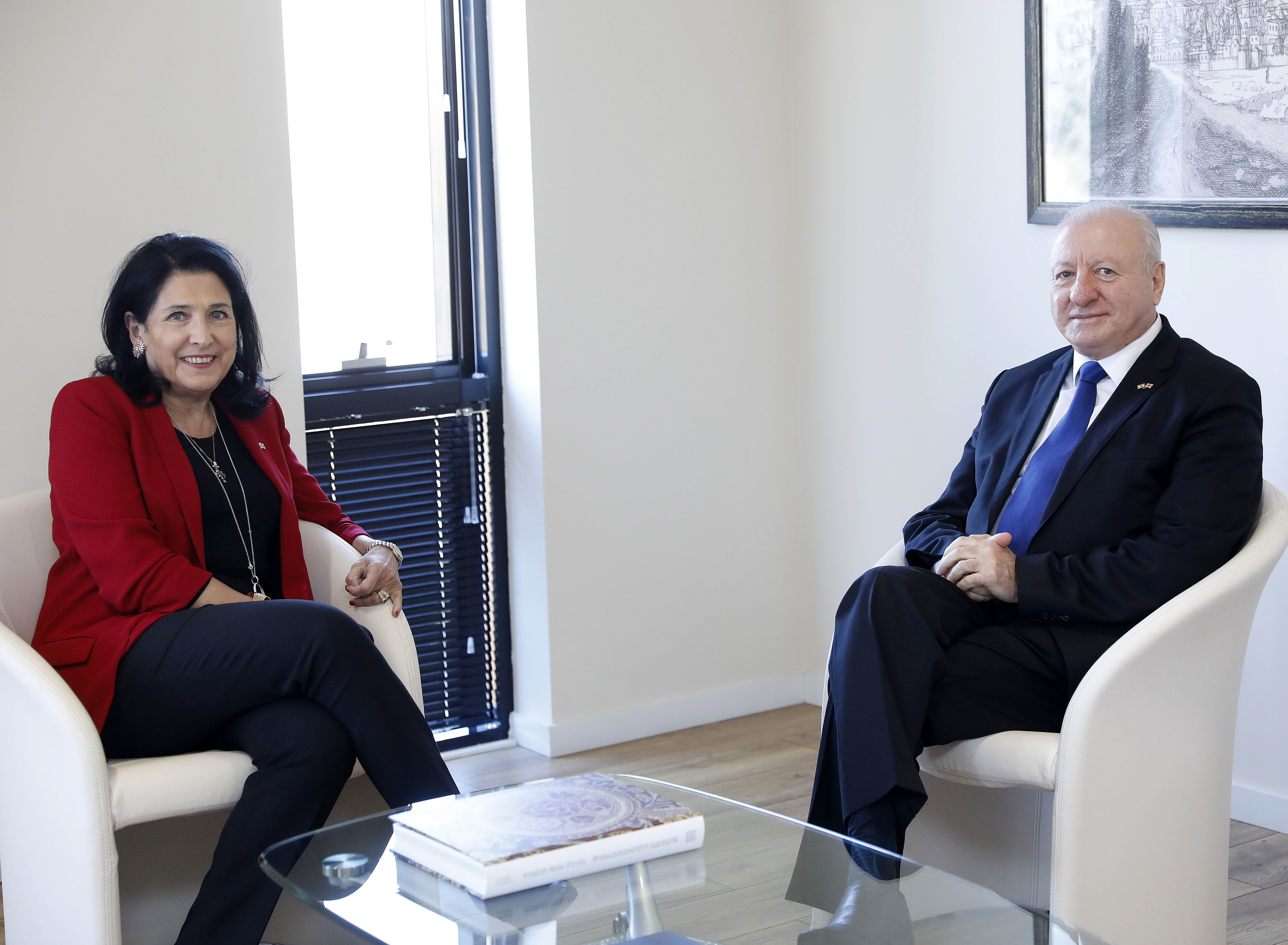
Tsur with President of Georgia Salome Zourabichvili, December 2019

Shabtai Tsur (Georgian: შოთა ცოციაშვილი; born 15 February 1951) is an Israeli politician, public official and diplomat. He serves as chairman of the Israel Sports Betting Board (Toto) and as a director of the Port of Ashdod. Tsur has served as Israel's ambassador to Georgia and was among the founders of the World Congress of Georgian Jews. In municipal politics, he served as acting mayor and deputy mayor of Ashkelon.

== Early life and career ==
Tsur was born Shota Tsotsiashvili (Georgian: შოთა ცოციაშვილი) in 1951 in Vani, in the Georgian Soviet Socialist Republic (now Georgia). He completed his secondary education in his hometown in 1967 and subsequently studied at Saint Petersburg State University until 1972. He later immigrated to Israel with his wife, Leah.

After settling in Ashkelon, Tsur worked at a local branch of Bank Leumi for two years beginning in 1979. During this period, he became acquainted with Eli Dayan and Benny Vaknin, members of the local political movement "Ashkelon Bitnufa" ("Ashkelon on the Rise"), and joined the Likud party. Following the movement's electoral victory, Tsur was elected to the Ashkelon City Council and was assigned several senior municipal portfolios.

== Political and diplomatic career ==
From 1985 to 1989, Tsur served as a member of the Ashkelon City Council. From 1989 to 2002, he served as deputy mayor under Benny Vaknin, later becoming acting deputy mayor.

In 2003, following Vaknin's departure from municipal office to become CEO of Pelephone, Tsur served as acting mayor of Ashkelon for three months. He received support from senior Likud figures, including then-Prime Minister Ariel Sharon, who frequently visited the city.

In the October 2003 municipal elections, Tsur was defeated by independent candidate Roni Mahatzri. He subsequently served as leader of the opposition in the city council until 2004.

In August 2004, Tsur was appointed Israel's ambassador to Georgia, a position he held for four years.

Previously, Tsur had served as Georgia's honorary consul in Israel from 1998 to 2004, and as an adviser to the Israeli prime minister on affairs relating to Georgia and the Caucasus from 1996 to 1998.

In 2014, Tsur submitted a request to Ashkelon's municipal naming committee to rename a street near his home, then known as Heil HaYam Street, after himself. The committee approved the request, but the decision was reversed following substantial public criticism. A street in his hometown of Vani, Georgia, was also named in his honor.

In September 2016, Tsur began a second term as Israel's ambassador to Georgia, having been appointed under the Ministry of Foreign Affairs' quota for political appointments. His term ended in 2020.

In December 2020, Tsur was appointed chairman of the Israel Sports Betting Board, commonly known as Toto. In 2024, he was appointed to an additional term by Minister of Culture and Sport Miki Zohar.

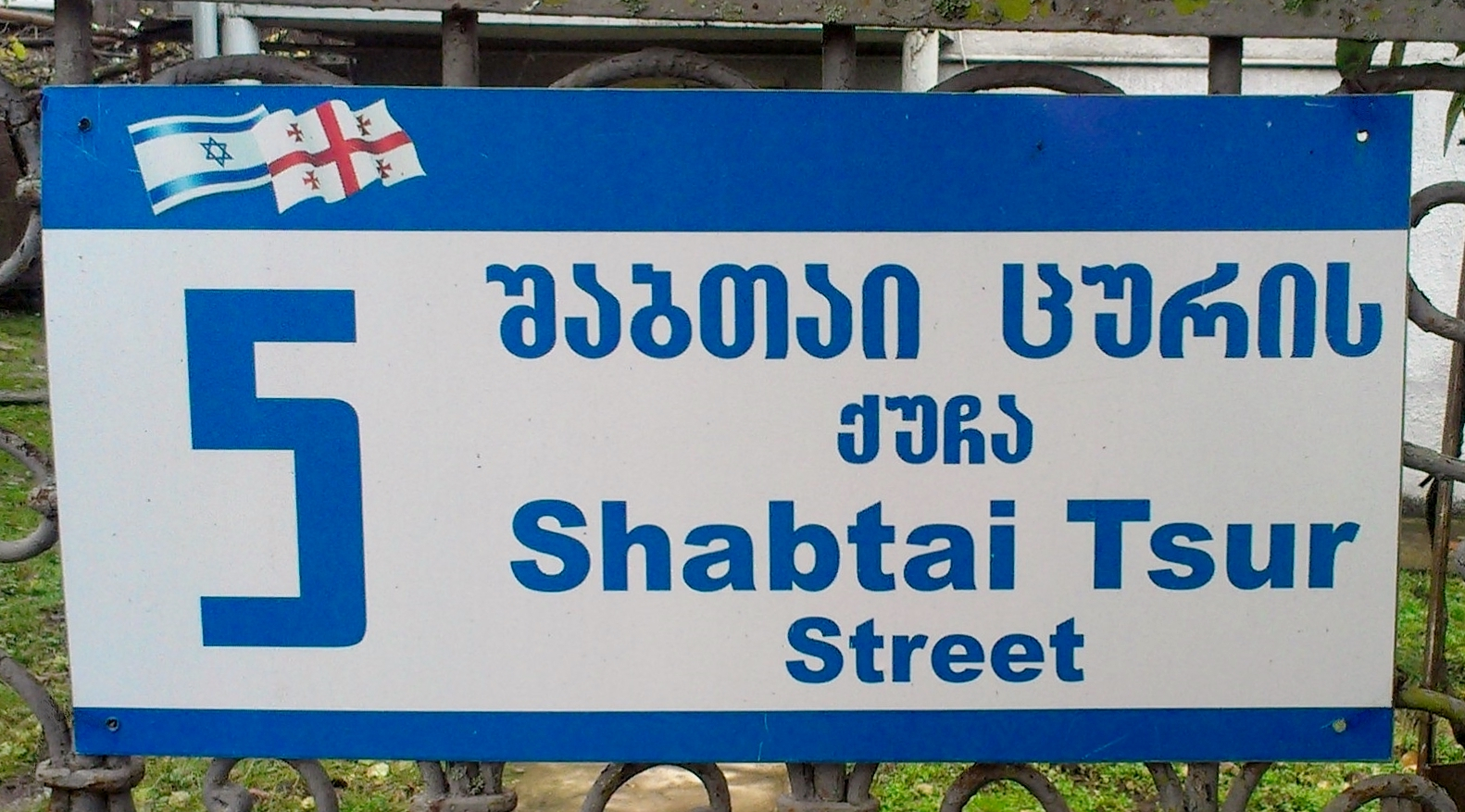
A street named after Shabtai Tsur in Vani, Georgia.
