= Sufa, Sinai =

Former Israeli settlement in Sinai, Egypt

Coordinates: 31°14′11″N 34°11′22″E

Sufa (Hebrew: סוּפָה, lit. Storm) was an Israeli settlement and kibbutz in Sinai. Located two kilometres east of Yamit, it was evacuated as part of the Egyptian-Israeli Peace Treaty in 1982. Its former residents established a new kibbutz by the same name in the north-western Negev desert near the border with the Gaza Strip.

Sufa was established in 1974 as a Nahal settlement, its name derived from the severe dust storms which occurred in the area. On 17 January 1977 it was recognised as a kibbutz.
