= Yuval Fuchs =

Israeli diplomat

- יובל פוקס

Israeli Ambassador to Georgia
- In office 2012–2016
- Preceded by: Itzhak Gerberg
- Succeeded by: Shabtai Tsur

Personal details
- Born: 1961 (age 64–65) Haifa, Israel
- Occupation: Ambassador

Yuval Fuchs (Hebrew: יובל פוקס; born 1961) is an Israeli diplomat. Since 2023 he is the Deputy Director General for Eurasia and Western Balkan at the Israeli Ministry of Foreign Affairs in Jerusalem. Until August 2016, he was the Ambassador of Israel to Georgia.

== Biography ==
Yuval Fuchs was born and raised in Haifa. His ancestors were deeply rooted in Safed and Rosh Pina, and were among the founders of Kfar Tavor. In 1979 he enlisted in the Israel Defense Forces for three years compulsory service, and served in the Nahal Brigade. He then spent a year on a kibbutz.

From 1985 to 1988 he attended the Hebrew University of Jerusalem and earned a BA in Philosophy and History. From 1989 to 1991, he studied at the University of Freiburg in Germany, graduating with a master's degree in Philosophy and History. During his studies in Germany, he worked as a research assistant and Hebrew teacher at the University of Frieburg and the University of Hamburg.

== Diplomatic career ==
In 1994 joined the Israeli Foreign Service and has served in various positions in the Israeli diplomatic missions in Prague, Berlin and Moscow. In August 2012 he was appointed Israel's ambassador to Georgia until August 2016.
