= Sufa, Israel =

Kibbutz in southern Israel

Sufa: סוּפָה (Hebrew); صوفا (Arabic)
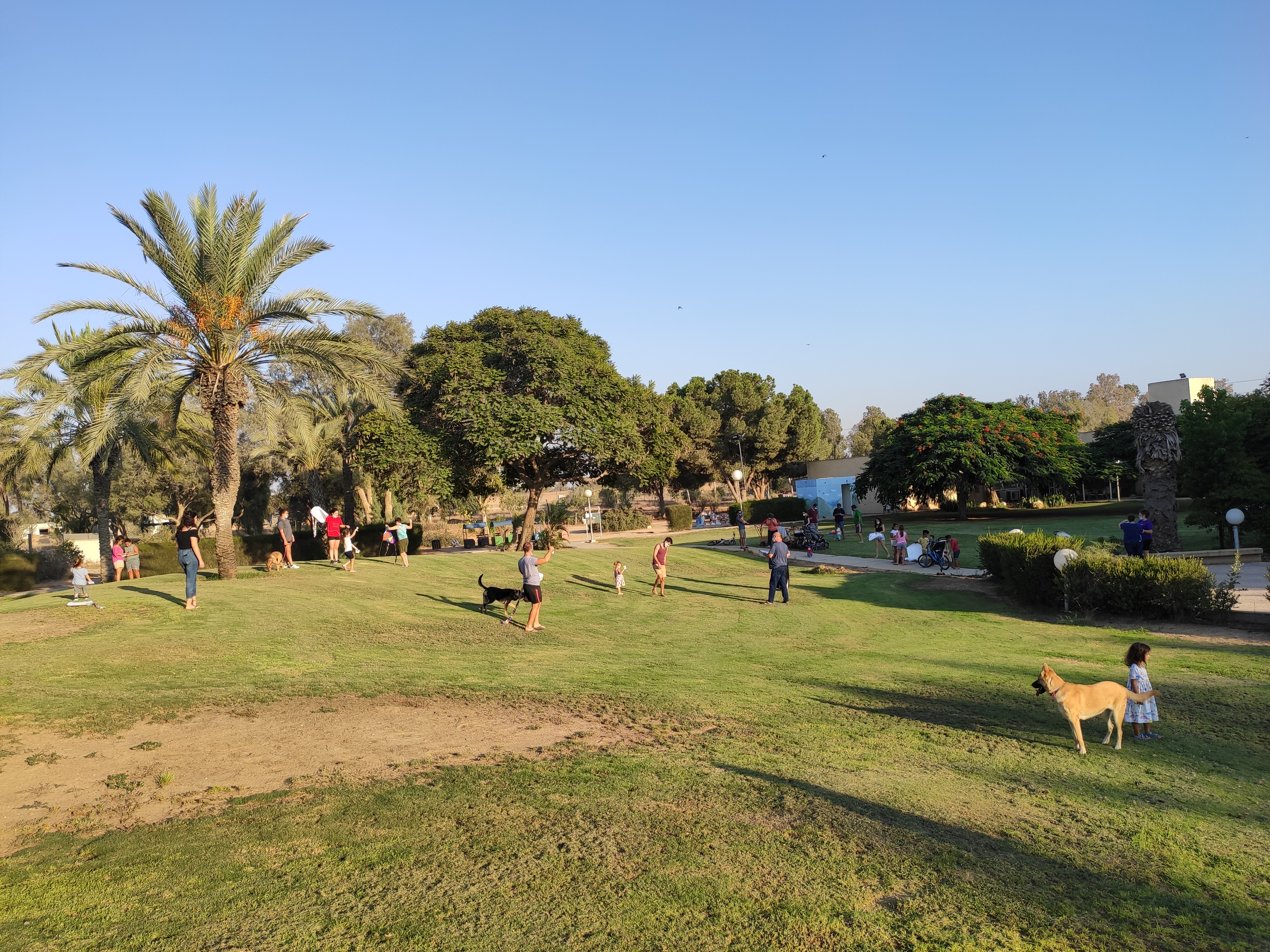

- Location within Northwest Negev region of Israel Location within Israel
- Coordinates: 31°14′14″N 34°20′29″E
- Country: Israel
- District: Southern
- Subdistrict: Beersheba
- Council: Eshkol
- Affiliation: Kibbutz Movement
- Founded: 1982
- Founder: Evacuated settlers
- Population (2024): 266
- Website: www.sufa.org

Sufa (Hebrew: סוּפָה, lit. 'Storm') is a kibbutz in southern Israel. Located in the Hevel Shalom area of the north-western Negev desert, it falls under the jurisdiction of Eshkol Regional Council. In 2024 it had a population of 266.

A border crossing between Israel and the Gaza Strip named after the kibbutz was located nearby, but was closed permanently by Israel in 2008.

== History ==
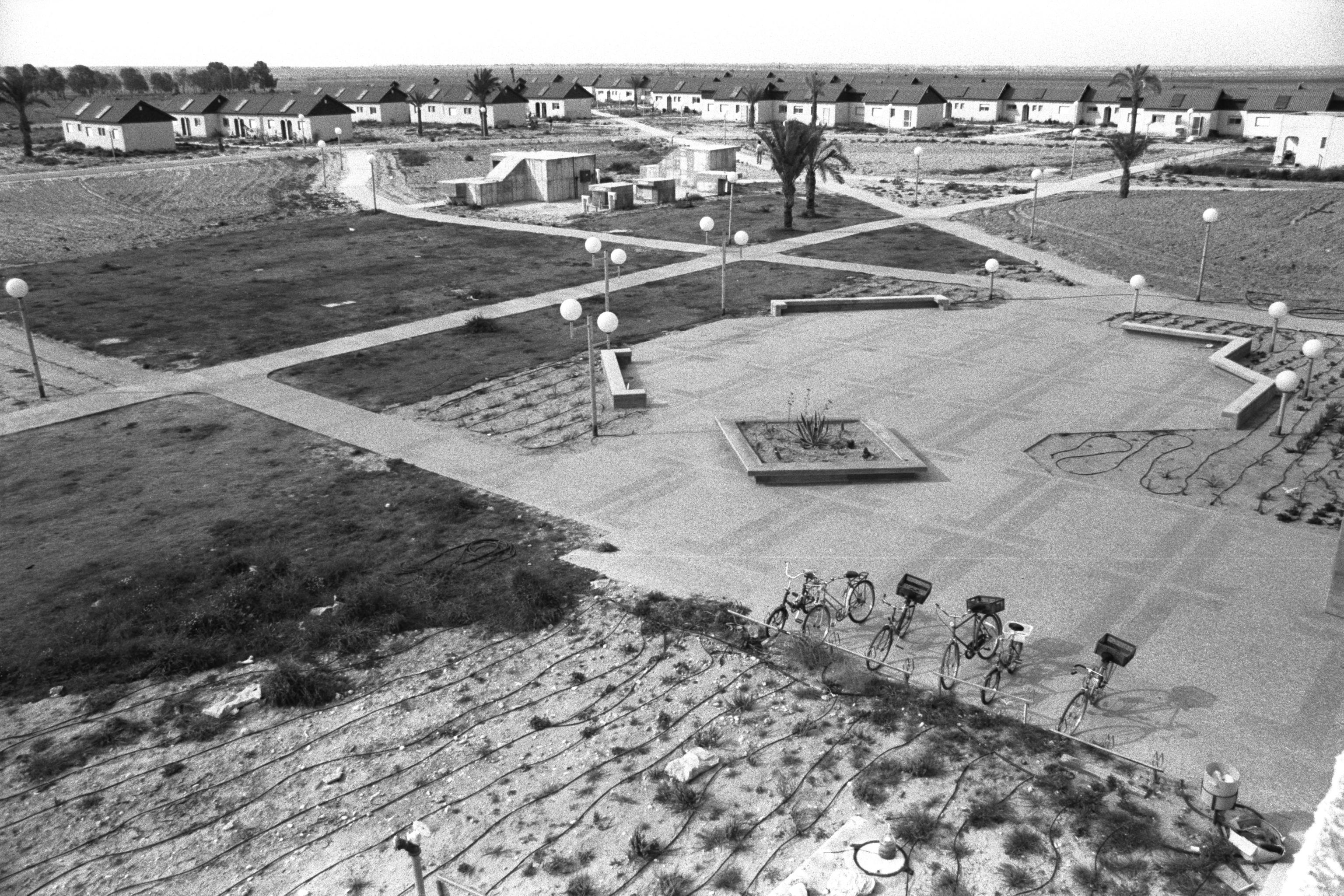
The kibbutz, in the center is a newly planted garden

The kibbutz was founded in 1982 by former residents of Sufa, an Israeli settlement in Sinai which was evacuated as part of the Egyptian-Israeli Peace Treaty. Its name is derived from the severe dust storms which occurred in the original settlement. To the north of the kibbutz, where Nirim was between the years 1946–1949, lies the memorial site "Dangur", commemorating the casualties of the Egyptian attack on Nirim and a memorial for the eight fallen soldiers.

As part of the October 7 attacks, about 50 Hamas terrorists stormed Sufa. The kibbutz's security team managed to prevent all but four from infiltrating. Sufa was one of the Israeli villages briefly under Hamas control at the start of the Gaza war, with three residents killed. A women's tank platoon of the Caracal Battalion was crucial for recapturing the kibbutz.

== Border crossing ==
The Sufa border crossing was used by Palestinians working on Israeli farms. During the Second Intifada (2000–2005), the border crossing and the military base next to it were subject to several Palestinian attacks, and the crossing was intermittently closed. In October 2007, the crossing was closed, leaving the Kerem Shalom crossing as the only point of entry. In November, despite IDF objections saying it was harder to guard than Kerem Shalom, Deputy Defense Minister Matan Vilnai decided to reopen the crossing. It was then used to transfer humanitarian assistance to the Strip.

In May 2008 the crossing was once again closed following a mortar attack which wounded an IDF soldier. A few days later, thousands of Palestinians protested the Israeli blockade. Six people were reported wounded by the IDF in that incident. On 1 June about forty Israeli farmers protested at the crossing, in a bid to stop the transportation of goods into the Strip despite the ongoing Qassam rocket barrages. As a result, the Sufa border crossing was permanently closed in 2008.
