= Avraham Hovelashvili =

Israeli military commander (1997–2023)

Avraham Hovelashvili (Hebrew: אברהם חובלאשוילי; Georgian: აბრაამ ჰოვლაშვილი; 8 July 1997 – 7 October 2023) was the deputy commander of the Caracal Battaltion until he was killed in action on October 7, 2023. He was the second Georgian Jew to be killed in the October 7 attack.

== See also ==
- Lasha Zhvania
