= Caracal Battalion =

Infantry battalion of the Israel Defense Forces

33rd "Caracal" Battalion
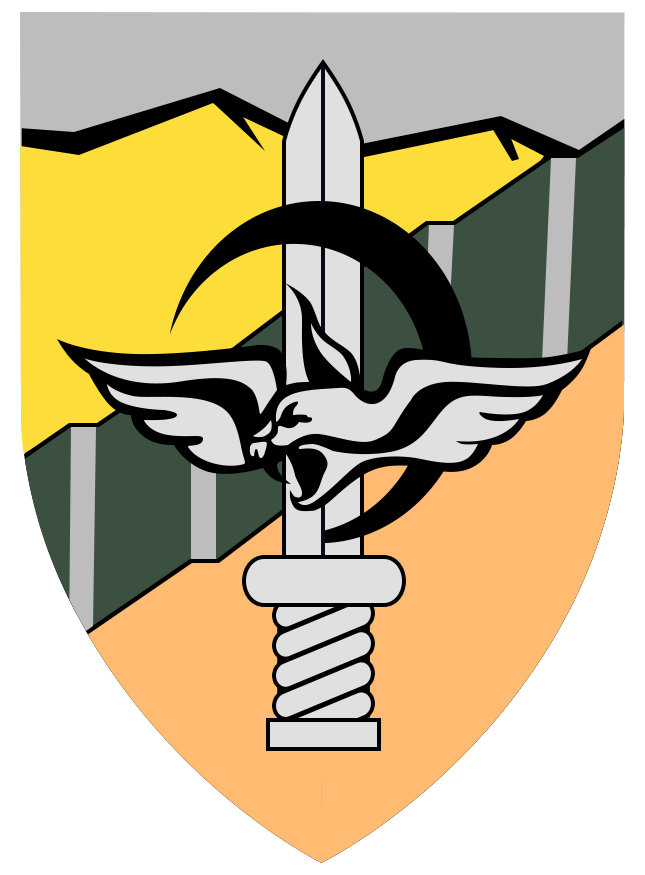
- Active: 2000–Current
- Country: Israel
- Branch: Ground Forces
- Type: Infantry
- Part of: Paran Brigade, Southern Command
- Motto: "The winning combination"
- Colors: Light yellow with brown camouflage beret, Orange & Bordeaux Flag
- Engagements: Al-Aqsa Intifadah; 2005 Gaza withdrawal; 2006 Israel-Lebanon War; Gaza war

Commanders
- Current commander: Lt. Col. Or Ben Yehuda

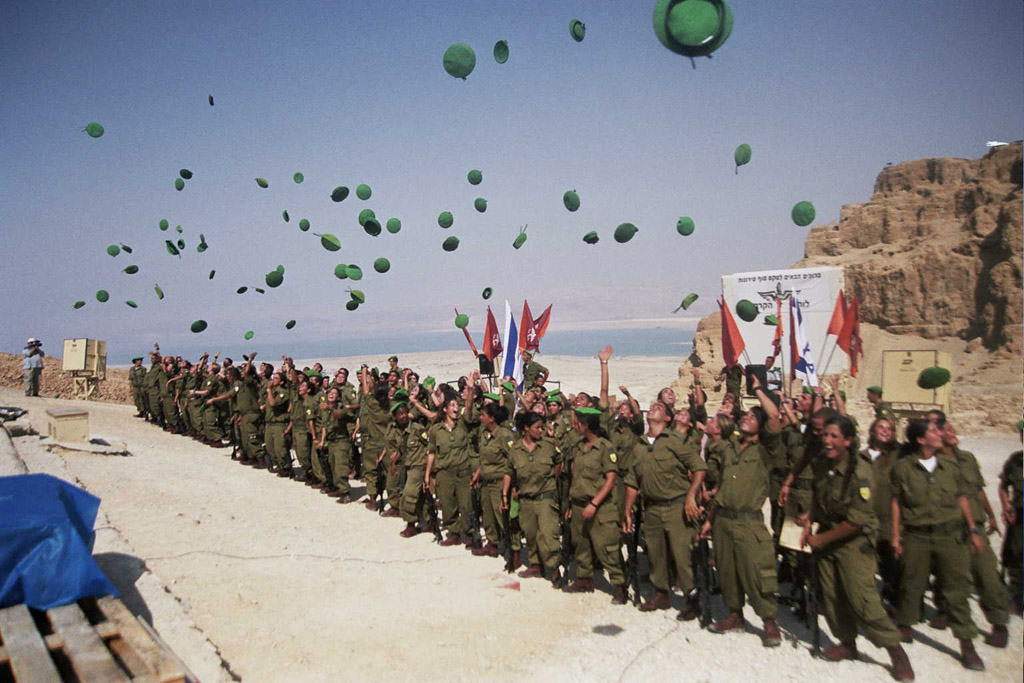
Beret doffing ceremony at Masada

The 33rd "Caracal" Battalion (Hebrew: גדוד קרקל) is an infantry combat battalion of the Israel Defense Forces, one of the three fully combat units (alongside the 'Lions of Jordan Battalion' and the 'Cheetah Battalion') in the Israeli military's Paran Brigade that are composed of both male and female soldiers. It is named after the caracal, a small cat whose sexes appear the same. As of 2009, approximately 70% of the battalion was female.

The Caracal Battalion is unique among the border patrol battalions as apart from its infantry units, it includes a tank unit made from female soldiers entirely. The squad (called Pere Squad) was formed after a multiple year long pilot which tested the ability to involve women in the Armored Corps.

== History ==
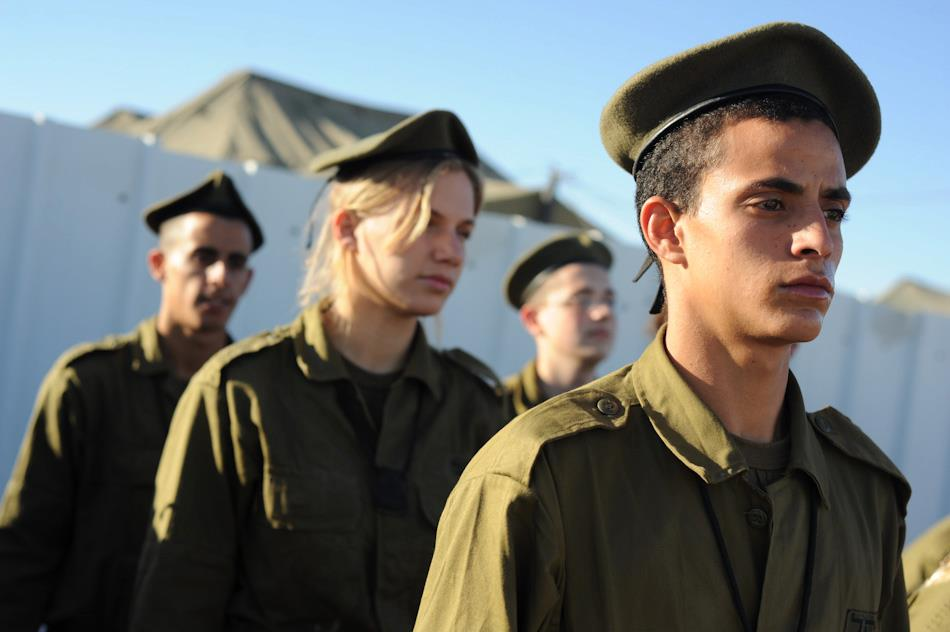
Cadets' first day in the Caracal Battalion

Prior to Caracal's formation in 2000, women were barred from serving in direct combat. The unit has since been tasked with patrolling the Israeli-Egyptian border. It took part in Israel's unilateral withdrawal from the Gaza Strip in the summer of 2005.

On 21 September 2012, three heavily armed Egyptian militants, who were dressed in civilian clothes, armed with two explosive belts, and carrying rifles and 3 RPG launchers, approached the Egypt-Israel border near Mount Harif, at an area where the Egypt–Israel barrier remained incomplete. At the time of the attack, Israel had completed the construction of about 200 kilometers from the fence, while only 40 kilometers were remaining — including the area of Mount Harif — a project which the IDF estimated to complete during 2013. The militants opened fire on a group of IDF soldiers from the Artillery Corps, who were safeguarding civilian workers who were constructing the border fence. The militants began the attack when they opened fire at a small group of IDF soldiers, shooting at them from approximately hundred meters, as they were giving water to a group of 10 illegal immigrants from Africa who were crossing the border as well. Members of the Caracal Battalion rushed to the scene of the attack and engaged in a firefight with the militants. During the exchange of fire, the explosive belt on one of the militants detonated. Eventually the IDF forces at the site managed to kill the remaining two militants. One of the militants was killed by a female combat soldier from the Caracal Battalion.

In October 2014, a jeep of the battalion was attacked by militants from the Egyptian border with gunfire and an anti-tank missile. Two soldiers were injured. One of the injured, a female officer, Captain Or Ben-Yehuda, nonetheless dismounted from the jeep and returned fire killing one militant in the fire-fight.

In November 2017, Caracal officially became part of the border array (alongside the 'Lions of Jordan Battalion' and the 'Cheetah Battalion') and replaced the green beret with a light yellow and brown camouflage.

While Caracal is a mixed gender battalion, it has been 70% female since 2009. Previously a part of the 512th Sagi Brigade of the Southern Command, the battalion currently operates under the command of the Paran Brigade after a reconfiguration of the southern Sagi Brigade.

At Sufa and Holit the Caracal Battalion, under the command of Lt. Col. Or Ben-Yehuda, claimed to have eliminated nearly 100 Hamas terrorists during the 2023 Hamas invasion of southern Israel. The deputy commander of the battalion, Lieutenant Colonel Avraham Hovelashvili, was killed in the fighting on October 7th while fighting terrorists he encountered en route to joining Caracal troops fighting near Sufa.

== Training ==
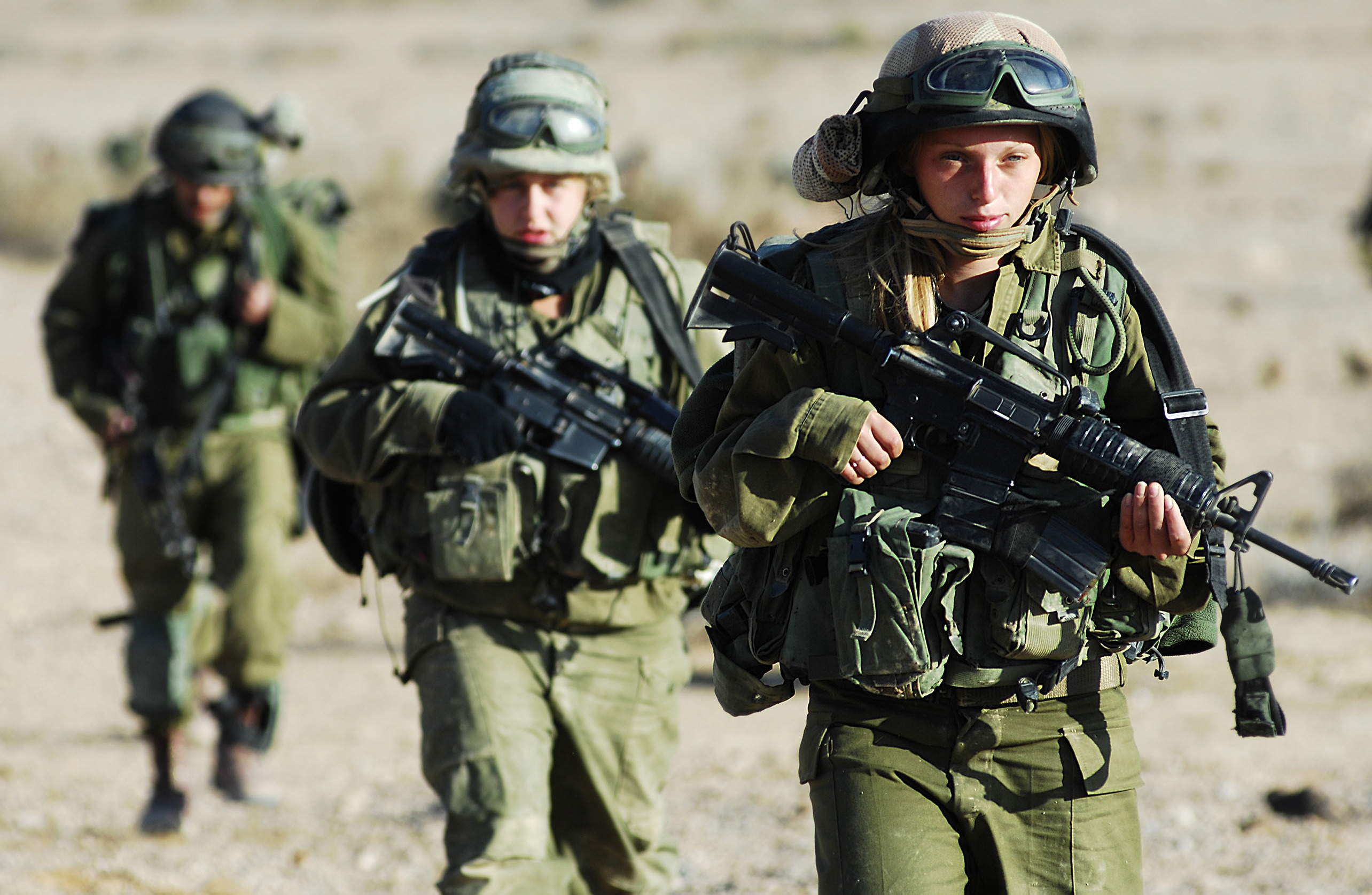
Female soldiers taking part in Caracal Winter Training

Members of the Caracal Battalion were formerly issued the Israeli-made Tavor assault rifle. but are now issued M4 carbines or M16 rifles.

Battalion members partake in a four-month basic training period that includes physical training and weapons training at the Givati Brigade training base.

== Notable recruits ==
Second Lieutenant Noy, who is serving in the Caracal Battalion, was the first female officer to command a sniper platoon.

Elinor Joseph, who has also served with the Caracal Battalion, is the first Arab woman ever to serve in a combat role in the Israeli Army.

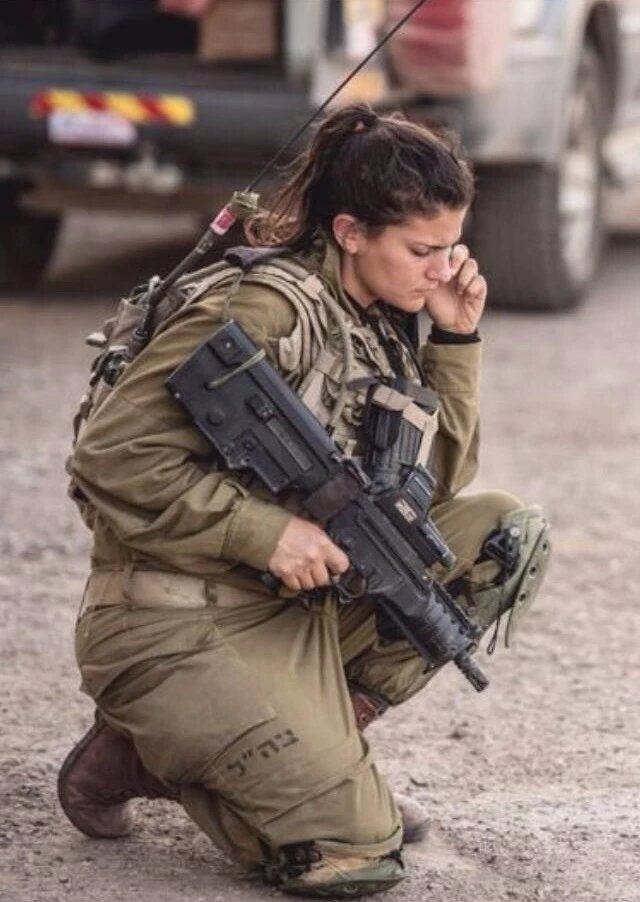
Or Ben Yehuda, commander of Caracal Battalion

Captain Or Ben-Yehuda was awarded a citation while serving in the Caracal Battalion. Ben-Yehuda was in charge of the Caracal Battalion, which was stationed near the Israeli-Egyptian border. Nearly two dozen armed men opened fire on their position in an ambush attack on October 22, 2014. Although wounded in the volley of gunfire, Ben-Yehuda managed to get on the radio and call for backup, administer first aid to her driver and return several magazines worth of gunfire back at her attackers while waiting for reinforcements.

Deputy commander Major Avraham "Avi" Hovelashvili was killed in action on October 7, 2023.

== See also ==
- Gender-blindness
- Gender equality
- Women in the Israel Defense Forces
- Lionesses for National Defence - Syrian female combat roles
