= 190 Squadron (Israel) =

- טייסת מגע הקסם
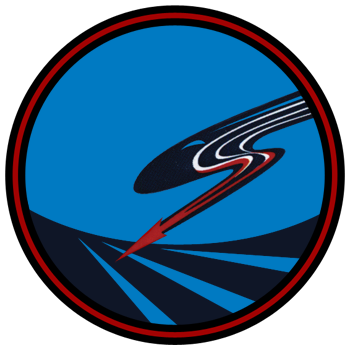
- Magic Touch Squadron
- Active: 1979–1995 -MD 500 Defender; 2005–present -AH-64A
- Country: Israel
- Branch: Israeli Air Force
- Role: Air Defence, Ground Support, Attacking targets, escorting missions, special operations
- Garrison/HQ: Ramat David Airbase
- Nickname: Tayeset maga hakesem
- Engagements: MD 500 Defender: 1982 Lebanon war Operation Accountability; AH-64A: Operation Grapes of Wrath; Second Intifada; Operation Defensive Shield; 2006 Lebanon War; Gaza War (2008–2009); 2012 Israeli operation in the Gaza Strip; 2014 Gaza War; 2021 Israel–Palestine crisis Gaza war

Aircraft flown
- Attack helicopter: AH-64A Apache

The 190 Squadron of the Israeli Air Force, also known as the tayeset maga hakesem (Magic Touch Squadron), is a helicopter squadron, which operates Boeing AH-64A Apache helicopters from Ramat David Airbase, to which it relocated in August 2026 from Ramon Airbase.

== History ==
The squadron was formed in 1980 in Palmachim Airbase, flying the McDonnell Douglas MD 500 Defender. In 1995, the squadron received AH-64As at Ramat David Airbase. It later moved to Ramon Airbase.

The squadron took part in the 1982 Lebanon-Israel war and the 2006 Lebanon-Israel war, mostly making precise strikes and supporting ground forces. It also took part in all the Israel-Gaza wars and the second intifada where it mostly supported ground troops and made airstrikes.

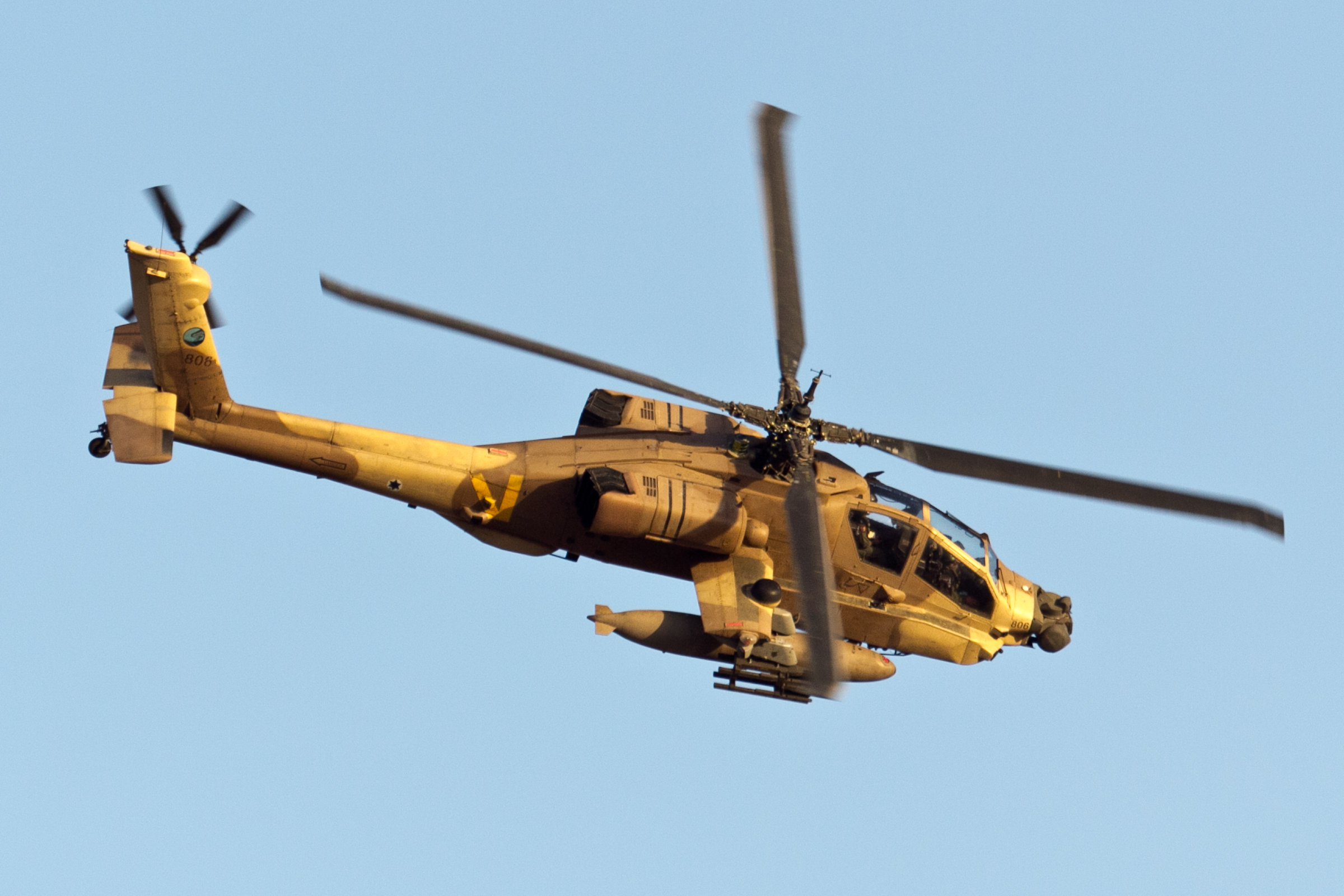
An AH-64A of the 190 squadron
