= Yossi Bachar =

Israeli Major general

- יוסי בכר
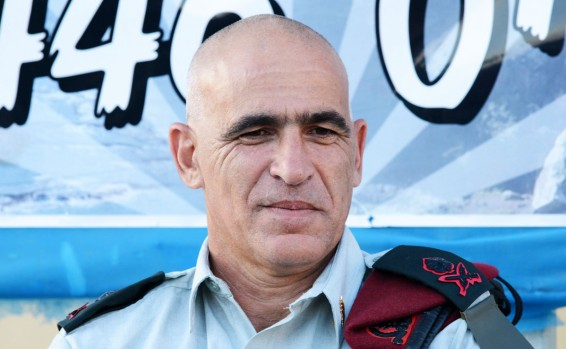
- Bachar in 2024
- Born: 9 April 1964 (age 62); Israel
- Military career
- Allegiance: Israel
- Branch: Israel Defense Forces
- Service years: 1983–
- Rank: Aluf (Major general)
- Unit: Paratroopers Brigade
- Commands: 101st "Peten" (Elapidae) paratroop battalion, Maglan Unit, 55th Paratroopers Brigade, Paratroopers Brigade, Gaza Division, IDF's General Staff Corps
- Conflicts: South Lebanon conflict (1985–2000); First Intifada; Second Intifada; 2006 Lebanon War; Operation Cast Lead; Operation Pillar of Defense; Operation Protective Edge; Gaza war

Yossi Bachar (Hebrew: יוסי בכר; born 9 April 1964) is an Israeli Major general (Aluf) who commands the IDF's General Staff Corps.

== Biography ==
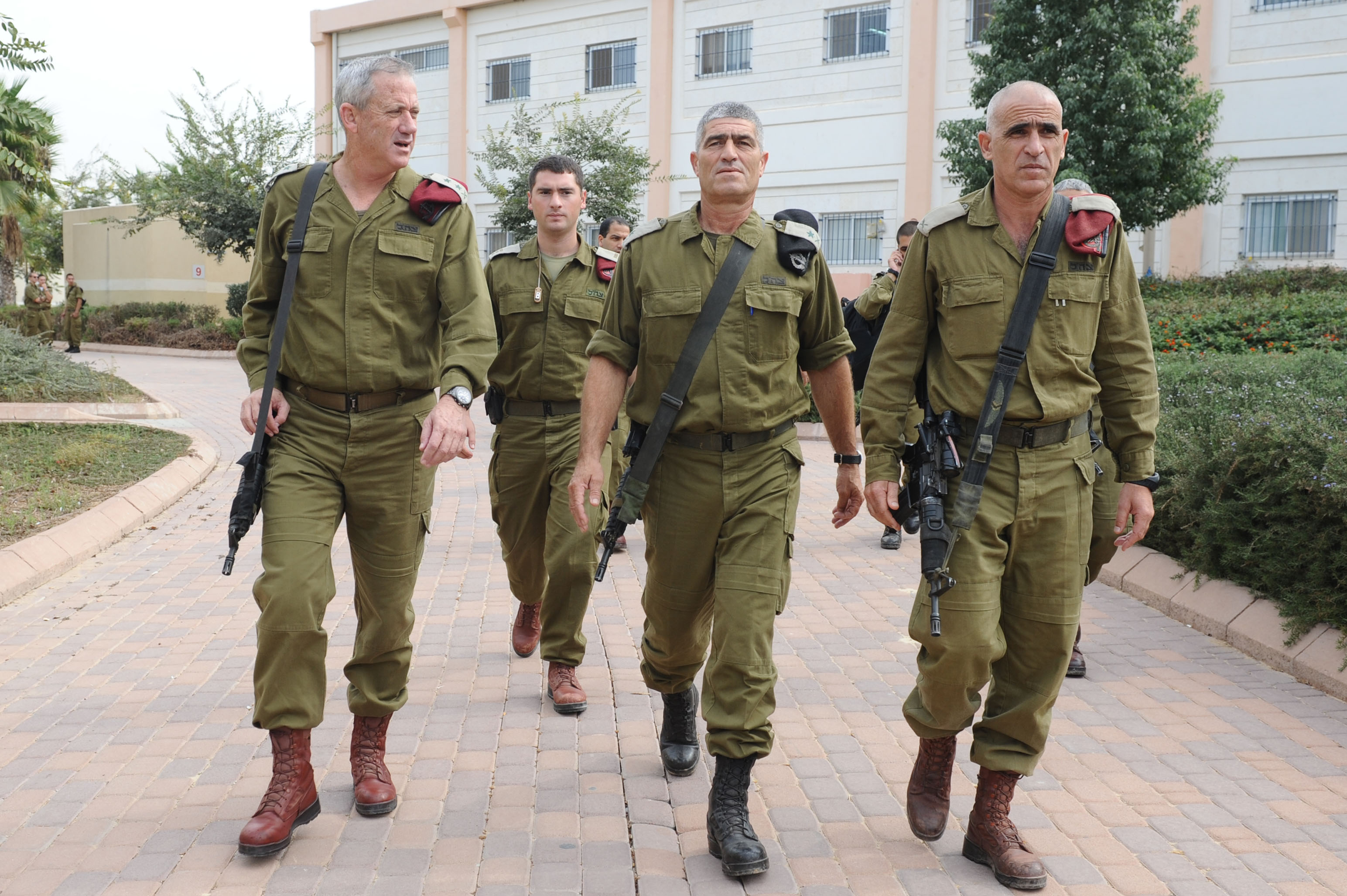
Yossi Bechar (right) with Tal Russo and Benny Gantz on a tour during Operation Pillar of Defense

Bachar was born in Rehovot, and grew up and was educated in Kibbutz Be'eri. In 1983, he enlisted in the IDF and volunteered for the Paratroopers Brigade, joining the Nahal Airborne Battalion. He underwent combat training, completed the Infantry Commanders Course, and the Infantry Officers Course. After completing the officers' course, he returned to the Paratroopers as a Platoon Commander in the Nahal Airborne Battalion and served in the battalion until the role of Company Commander. In 1988, he served as a company commander at Bahad 1 and from 1990 to 1992, he served as commander of the Paratroopers Reconnaissance Company (Palchan).

After a period of studies at the IDF Command and Staff College and earning a bachelor's degree in History from Tel Aviv University, in 1994 he was appointed commander of the Paratroopers Reconnaissance Unit (Sayeret). During his tenure, the unit carried out several successful operations in South Lebanon, most notably Operation Guf Himum, in which six terrorists were killed in an ambush without any casualties on the Israeli side. Due to the unit's success during his command, the Egoz Unit was re-established, drawing on combat methods he helped develop. Despite the intense operational activity, no soldiers were killed by enemy fire during his command. Under his leadership, the unit shifted its operational outlook and learned to operate in enemy territory for extended periods.

In 1996, he was appointed Battalion Commander of 101st Battalion, and later commanded the Paratroopers Brigade training base. From 1999 to 2001, he commanded the Maglan Unit. During this period, he participated in numerous operations in the Security Belt Campaign against Hezbollah. In 2001, he was promoted to Colonel and appointed commander of the reserve brigade 55th Brigade, while simultaneously studying Law at the Interdisciplinary Center Herzliya. Bachar led the brigade during Operation Defensive Shield, capturing Tulkarm and its surroundings, as well as Qabatiya, without casualties.

In 2003, following the death of Dror Weinberg, he was appointed commander of the Paratroopers Brigade, leading it in the fight against Palestinian terrorism during the Second Intifada, including in Operation Tight Embrace in Nablus, where his soldiers killed around 11 wanted terrorists and wounded many more. He concluded his command on 9 October 2005. On 20 August 2006, he was promoted to the rank of Brigadier General and appointed Chief Infantry and Paratroopers Officer. Following the Second Lebanon War, and the resignation of Gal Hirsch, he was appointed temporary commander of Galilee Division but returned to his previous position after several months. In November 2010, he was appointed commander of the Gaza Division. In July 2012, he commanded the division's forces in thwarting the infiltration of terrorists from Sinai who had taken control of armored personnel carriers from the Egyptian Army with the intention of carrying out an attack near Kerem Shalom Crossing. Bachar served in this role until November 2012. Following Operation Pillar of Defense, Bachar was appointed the IDF representative in talks with representatives of the Egyptian General Intelligence Directorate, who served as mediators in the indirect negotiations with Hamas regarding the terms of the ceasefire. In September 2013, he was appointed commander of the Company Commanders and Battalion Commanders Course.

On 2 September 2014, he was promoted to the rank of Major General and appointed commander of the IDF General Staff Corps. In this role, he coordinated the debriefings of IDF forces' actions during Operation Protective Edge. On 29 September 2016, he was additionally appointed commander of the School of Command, Control, and Operational Staff. In May 2018, he was simultaneously appointed deputy commander of Southern Command as part of the IDF's response to the Gaza–Israel border conflicts (2018–2021). In October 2018, he was succeeded by Major General Moti Baruch and retired from the IDF. In reserve duty, he serves as deputy commander of Southern Command.

In 2020, he joined "The Securityists" movement. In April 2020, Bachar was appointed to handle the COVID-19 crisis in the city of Beitar Illit, a role he held for a month, during which time the number of infected was reduced to zero.

During the Simchat Torah massacre on 7 October 2023, his 81-year-old mother Geula was murdered by Hamas terrorists participating in the Be'eri massacre. Bachar, who was at his home that morning, took a weapon from a security team member who was not at home and went out to try to rescue a kibbutz member who had been wounded by the terrorists. For several hours, he fought alongside another kibbutz member, Rami Gold, as they positioned themselves in a concealed location and sniped at the terrorists attacking the kibbutz. They estimated they killed around 15 Hamas terrorists who had infiltrated the kibbutz. His nephew Edan Baruch was also killed and another nephew, Sahar Baruch, was taken to Gaza as a hostage and was subsequently killed in captivity. During the subsequent Gaza war, Bachar served as deputy commander of Southern Command and participated in the planning and command of the ground maneuver carried out by Southern Command forces in the Gaza war.
