= 340th Division =

340th Division may refer to:

- 340th Volksgrenadier Division, Wehrmacht, Germany
- 340th Division (Israel)
- 340th Rifle Division, Soviet Union

== See also ==
- List of military divisions by number
