= 99th Infantry Division (Israel) =

- עוצבת הבזק
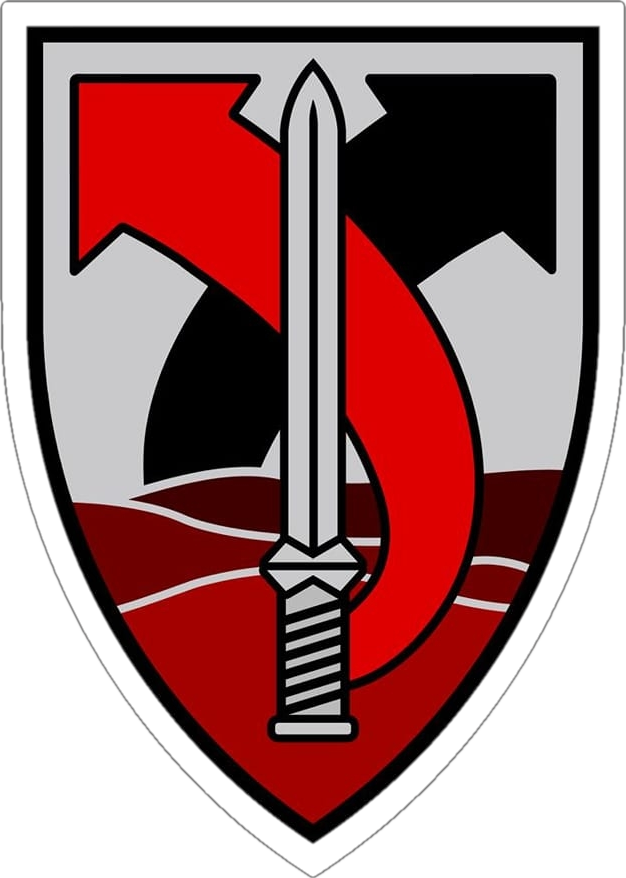
- 99th Division "Ha'Bazak" insignia
- Founded: 2020–present
- Country: Israel
- Branch: Israeli Ground Forces
- Size: Division
- Mottos: רָצוֹא וָשׁוֹב כְּמַרְאֵה הַבָּזָק (Desire and return like the appearance of lightning)
- Engagements: Gaza war

Commanders
- Current commander: Tat Aluf Barak Hiram

The Israeli 99th Infantry Division (Ha'Bazak) is a reserve division under the aegis of the Central Command.

On 15 September 2020, the division was established by Avi Rosenfeld and was based on the design of the Idan Division that was closed. It was the only division in the IDF not routinely subordinate to regional command, but instead under the command of the Maneuvering System in the Ground Forces.

In July 2023, the Chief of General Staff, Lt. Gen. Herzl Halevi, approved the subordination of the division to the Central Command. As part of this change, the multidimensional special operations Unit 888 (Wraith's Unit), left Division 99 and remained subordinate to the Maneuvering System.

Following a surprise attack on the Gaza envelope in October 2023, the division commander, Brig. Gen. Barak Hiram, operated with forces under his command from the division and other units to cleanse the area in the Gaza envelope, particularly in Kibbutz Be'eri.

As part of the ground manoeuvre in the Gaza Strip during the Gaza war, the division manoeuvred in southern Gaza and destroyed militant infrastructure, weaponry, and Hamas tunnels.

== Division organization ==
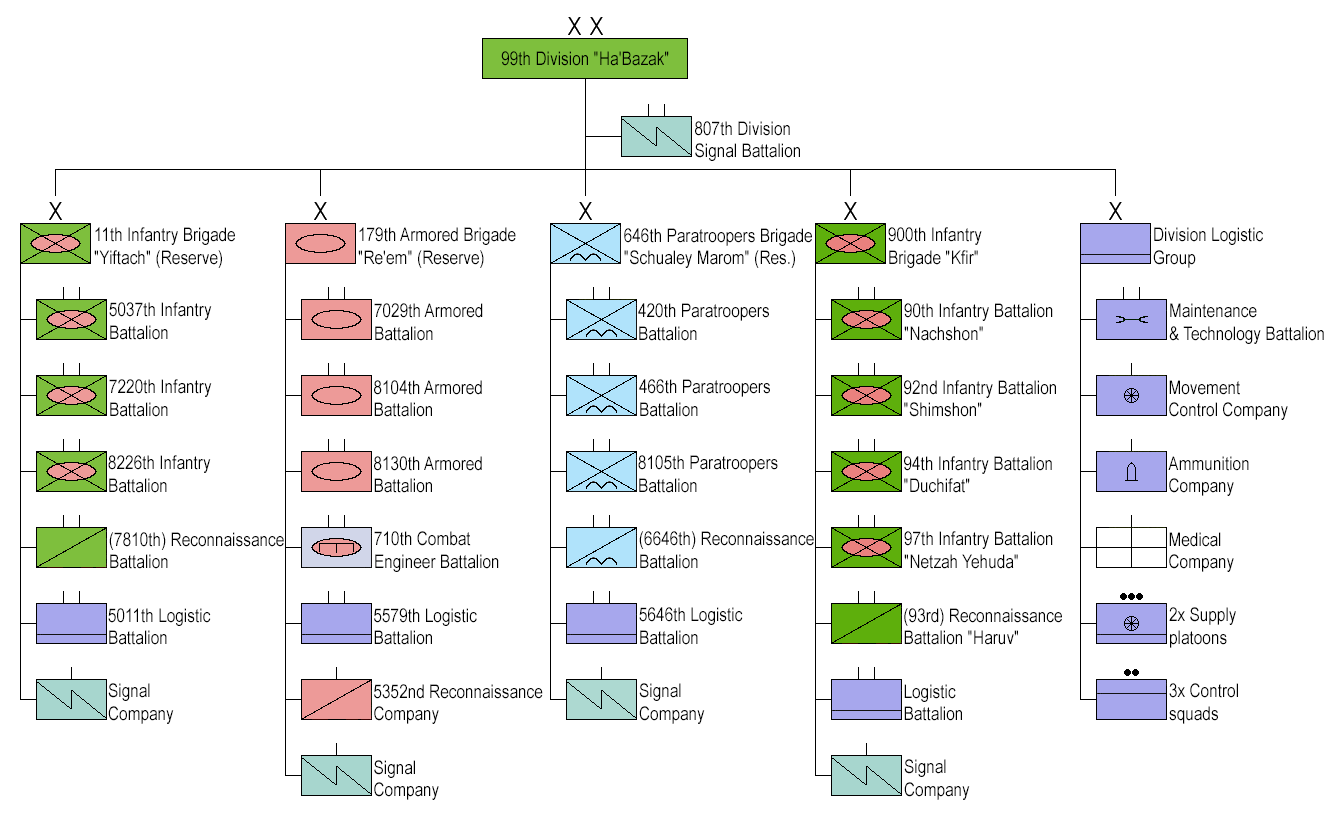
99th Division "Ha'Bazak" organization as of November 2026

- 99th Division "Ha'Bazak" (Reserve)
  - 11th Infantry Brigade "Yiftach" (Reserve)
    - 5037th Infantry Battalion
    - 7220th Infantry Battalion
    - 8226th Infantry Battalion
    - (7810th) Reconnaissance Battalion
    - 5011th Logistic Battalion
    - Signal Company
  - 179th Armored Brigade "Re'em" (Reserve)
    - 7029th Armored Battalion
    - 8104th Armored Battalion
    - 8130th Armored Battalion
    - 5352nd Reconnaissance Company
    - 710th Combat Engineer Battalion
    - 5579th Logistic Battalion
    - Signal Company
  - 646th Paratroopers Brigade "Schualey Marom" (Reserve)
    - 420th Paratroopers Battalion
    - 466th Paratroopers Battalion
    - 8105th Paratroopers Battalion
    - (6646th) Reconnaissance Battalion
    - 5646th Logistic Battalion
    - Signal Company
  - 900th Infantry Brigade "Kfir"
    - 90th Infantry Battalion "Nachshon"
    - 92nd Infantry Battalion "Shimshon"
    - 94th Infantry Battalion "Duchifat"
    - 97th Infantry Battalion "Netzah Yehuda"
    - (93rd) Reconnaissance Battalion "Haruv"
    - Logistic Battalion
    - Signal Company
  - 990th Artillery Brigade (Reserve artillery command without permanently attached battalions)
  - Division Logistic Group
  - 807th Division Signal Battalion
  - 8555th Reconnaissance-Strike Battalion "Magen Be'eri" (Reserve)
  - 5770th Mobility Unit "Tinshemet" (Reserve)

== See also ==
- Outline of the Gaza war
- Timeline of the 2023 Gaza Strip healthcare collapse
- Timeline of the Israeli–Palestinian conflict in 2023
- List of military engagements during the 2023 Israel–Hamas war
