= Be'eri massacre =

2023 massacre in Israel

- Part of the October 7 attacks
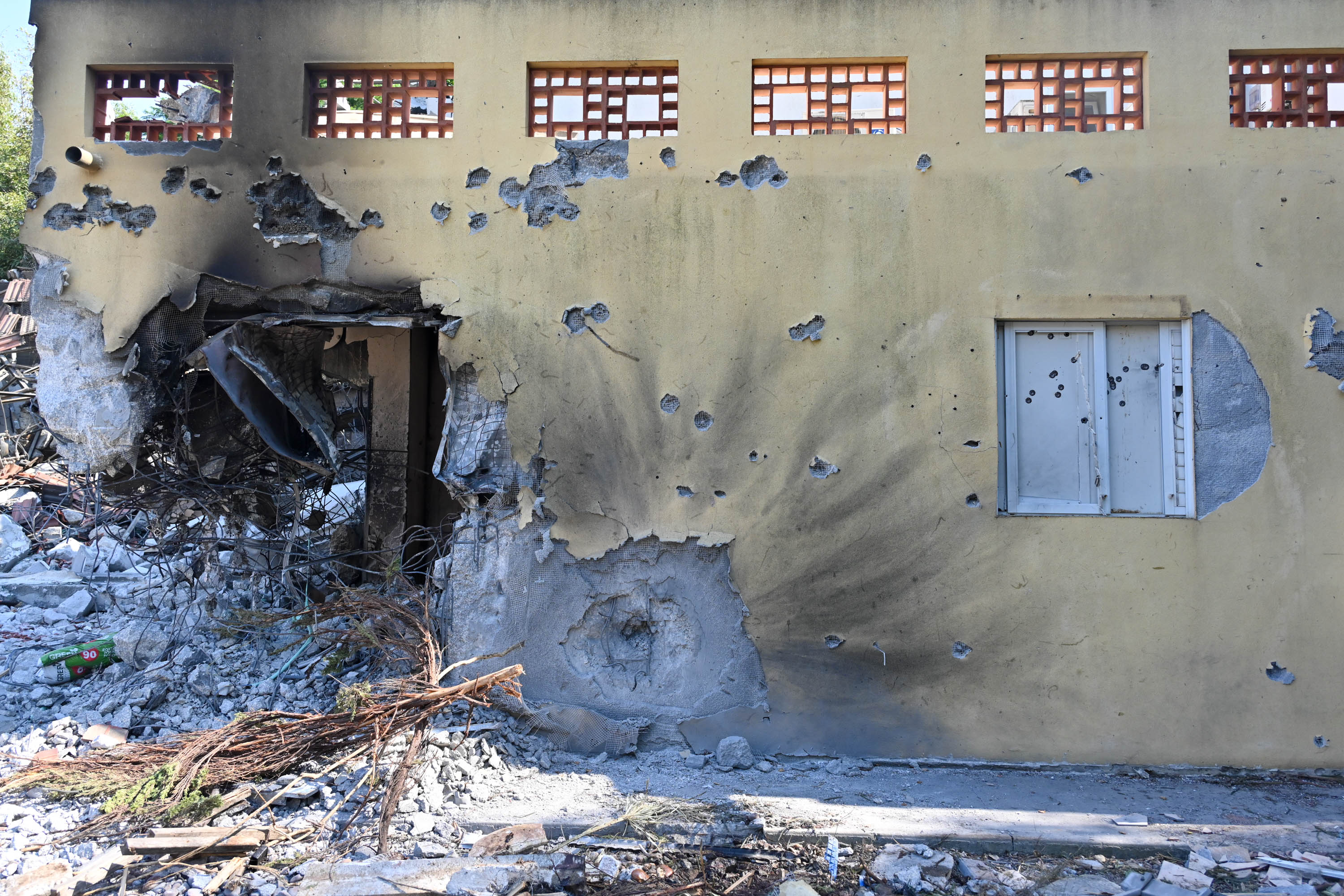
- One of the houses in Be'eri in the massacre's aftermath

- Site of the attack in Israel
- Native name: הטבח בבארי
- Location: 31°25′26″N 34°29′23″E; Be'eri, Southern District, Israel
- Date: 7 October 2023; 3 years ago
- Attack type: Mass shooting, mass murder, arson, war crimes
- Deaths: 132 Israelis; 101 Israeli civilians; 31 Israeli security personnel; 100+ Palestinian militants
- Victim: Hundreds missing
- Perpetrators: Palestinian Joint Operations Room: Hamas (Nuseirat Battalion) and other armed groups including PIJ; Democratic Front for the Liberation of Palestine (National Resistance Brigades)

During the October 7 attacks on Israel, Hamas militants carried out a massacre at Be'eri, a kibbutz near the Gaza Strip. Hundreds of Gazan militants and civilian looters attacked the kibbutz, killing and abducting civilians while facing resistance from armed residents. Israeli security forces regained control by the evening of 8 October. A total of 101 Israeli civilians and 31 security personnel were killed and 32 hostages were taken from the kibbutz. At least 100 Gazan militants were also killed and 18 were captured by the Israel Defense Forces (IDF) and the kibbutz security force.

Among the civilians killed were women (such as peace activist Vivian Silver), children, and one infant, claiming the lives of 10% of the farming community's residents. A total of 125 homes in the community were damaged or destroyed. Among the dead were twelve-year-old fraternal twins Liel and Yanai Hetzroni, whose father stated that the Hamas terrorists had come to the kibbutz only "to kill, murder, maim Jewish children, babies, parents and old people, all because they lived in the Jewish homeland."

This incident occurred concurrently with a series of other Palestinian attacks on Israel, including the Netiv HaAsara, Kfar Aza, and Nova music festival massacres. Several newspapers described the massacre as an act of terrorism, with CNN describing it as "the symbol of Hamas' brutality."

== Background ==
Be'eri is a kibbutz established in 1946 as one of the 11 points in the Negev of the Jewish Agency. Its members are generally on the secular left, and it includes many peace activists, some of whom assisted Palestinians in Gaza.

The kibbutz had around 1,200 residents before the attack and was the largest village of the Eshkol Regional Council.

== Attack ==
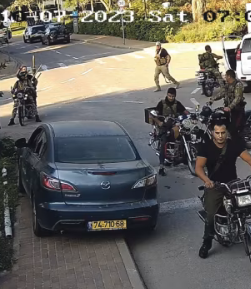
Hamas militants entering Be'eri, captured by a CCTV camera.

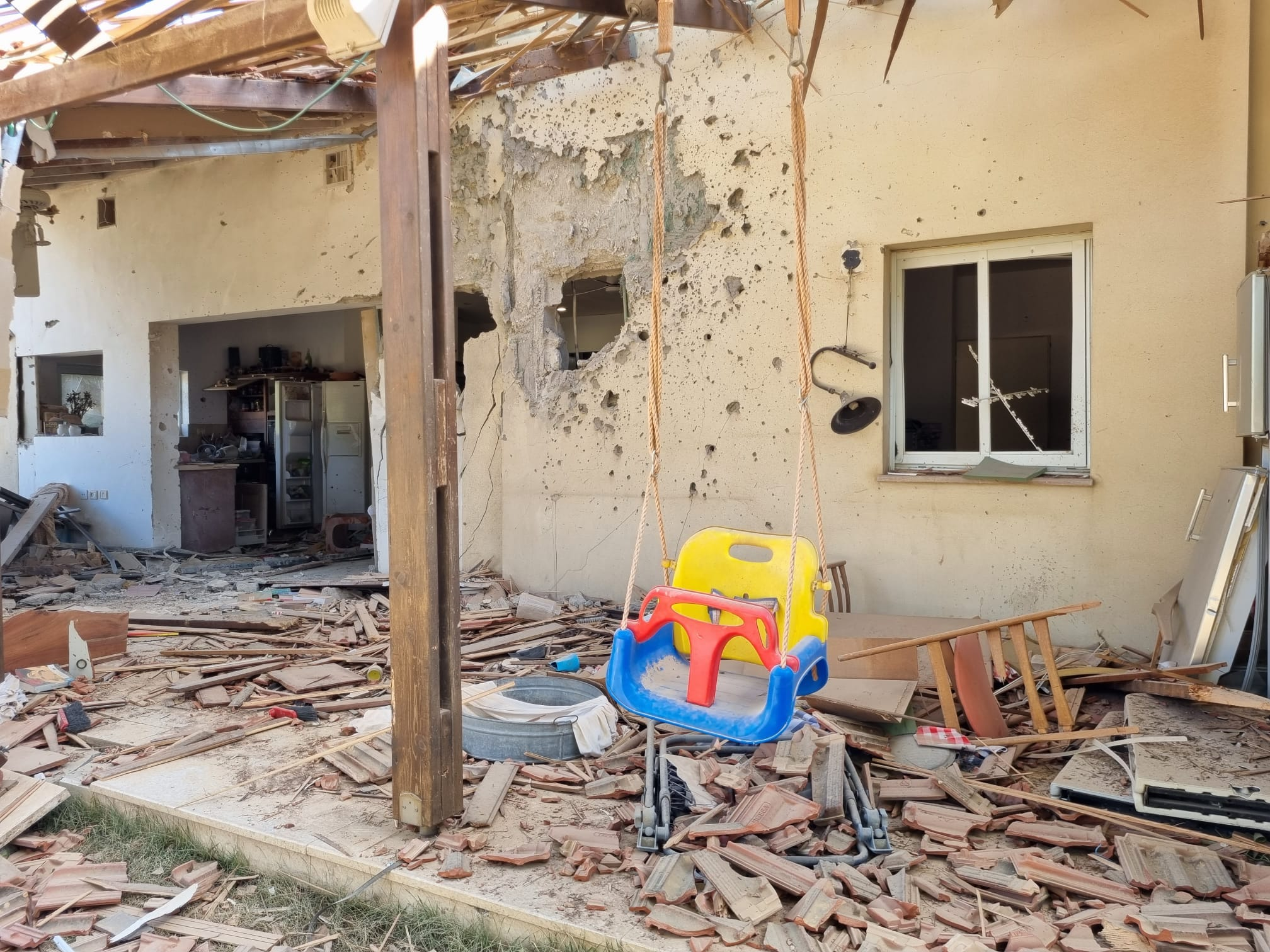
The courtyard of a destroyed home after the attack

The Hamas force targeting Be'eri consisted of militants belonging to the al-Qassam Brigades' Nuseirat Battalion led by Abed al-Rahman. The PIJ participated in the attack, as did other armed groups. The DFLP claimed that its troops (organized as National Resistance Brigades) fought the IDF in Be'eri. The IDF probe into the massacre estimated that at the height of the massacre there were 340 attackers in Be'eri, including 120 members of Hamas' Nukhba unit, 70 additional Hamas militants, and 150 members of the Islamic Jihad Movement, other armed factions, and Gazan civilian looters.

The Hamas attack on southern Israel began at 6:30 AM. Amid a heavy rocket barrage, Hamas militants broke through the border barrier into Israel, attacking civilian communities and military bases. The IDF's Paga outpost, located very close to the kibbutz and known internally in the IDF as the "Be'eri protector" outpost, was attacked. The soldiers there were forced to fight off the militants attacking their base and were unable to defend Be'eri. Other forces stationed in the area went to fight the attackers at kibbutz Nahal Oz, leaving Be'eri unprotected.

At 6:42 AM, Hamas militants from the 2nd company of the Nuseirat Battalion crossed the border and headed towards Be'eri on motorcycles. The first of them reached Be’eri at 06:56, with the last members reaching the kibbutz at 7:20 AM. In the meantime, the Nuseirat Battalion's 1st and 3rd companies perpetrated the Re'im music festival massacre and later headed towards Netivot, but turned back en route after spotting an Israeli tank and per instructions given by Hamas commanders, joined the 2nd company in the attack on Be'eri hours after the attack began. Hamas militants entered the kibbutz from two directions.

The kibbutz's 13-member security team responded to the infiltration. Arik Kraunik, the head of the security team, spotted the first Hamas militants as they approached the main entrance of the kibbutz on motorcycles. He notified the IDF and residents, and instructed the other members of the security team to meet at the kibbutz armory, which had most of their assault rifles. Kraunik approached the main entrance as two militants breached it and was killed in an exchange of fire. The two militants then moved through the kibbutz towards the northwestern side where additional militants were streaming in, killing civilians and members of the security team along the way. Meanwhile, Ilan Weiss, the deputy commander of the security team who lived on the western side of the kibbutz, was killed by militants as he headed towards the armory. His body was seized and taken to Gaza. As only Kraunik and Weiss had the keys to the armory, the surviving members of the security team had no access to the arsenal of assault rifles. They had between them six M16 assault rifles and some pistols.

The militants subsequently moved through the kibbutz, murdering civilians and setting homes on fire. The attackers shot and threw grenades, massacred the occupants of homes, and set some houses on fire with Molotov cocktails. They also abducted 32 people of whom 30 were kibbutz residents and two were civilians who had sought refuge there after fleeing the Re'im music festival massacre, taking them to the Gaza Strip. Videos emerged showing hostages being led barefoot across a street in town. The militants were accompanied by a camera team and journalist who documented the attack and extolled it as a Palestinian victory. The kibbutz security team and several other armed residents, including reserve IDF General Yossi Bachar, resisted the attack, preventing the militants from advancing to the center of the kibbutz. The IDF's investigation found that the resistance offered by the residents prevented a wider massacre from taking place.

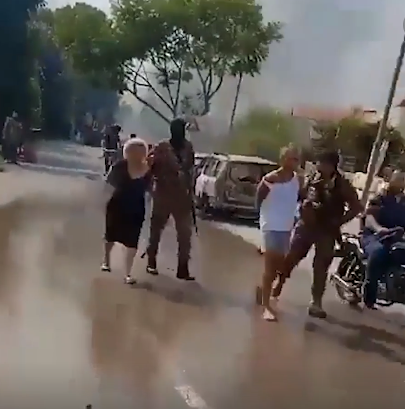
Hamas militants taking civilians hostage

As the attack unfolded, residents barricaded themselves in their safe rooms. Those who were members of a mothers' WhatsApp group in the kibbutz kept in touch throughout the attack, trying to piece together what was going on. Tutorials on locking doors were shared on the WhatsApp group, but concerns were expressed over the shelters' inability to stop attackers. In one instance, a resident built a makeshift locking device out of ropes and a baseball bat and gripped it throughout the time he and his family spent in the safe room. WhatsApp was used to advise occupants and share safehouses, but it also turned increasingly desperate as mentions of deaths of family members and a dead baby surfaced. One 10-month-old baby is confirmed to have been killed during the attack, shot through the door of a safe room while held in the arms of her mother. In numerous instances, militants blew up the safe room doors and killed those inside. In one case, after walking into a home and finding the 99 year old Anadad Eldan and his 88 year old wife Shari, they spared them. Eldan was the author of a noted poem on Gaza entitled 'Samson Tearing His Clothes.'

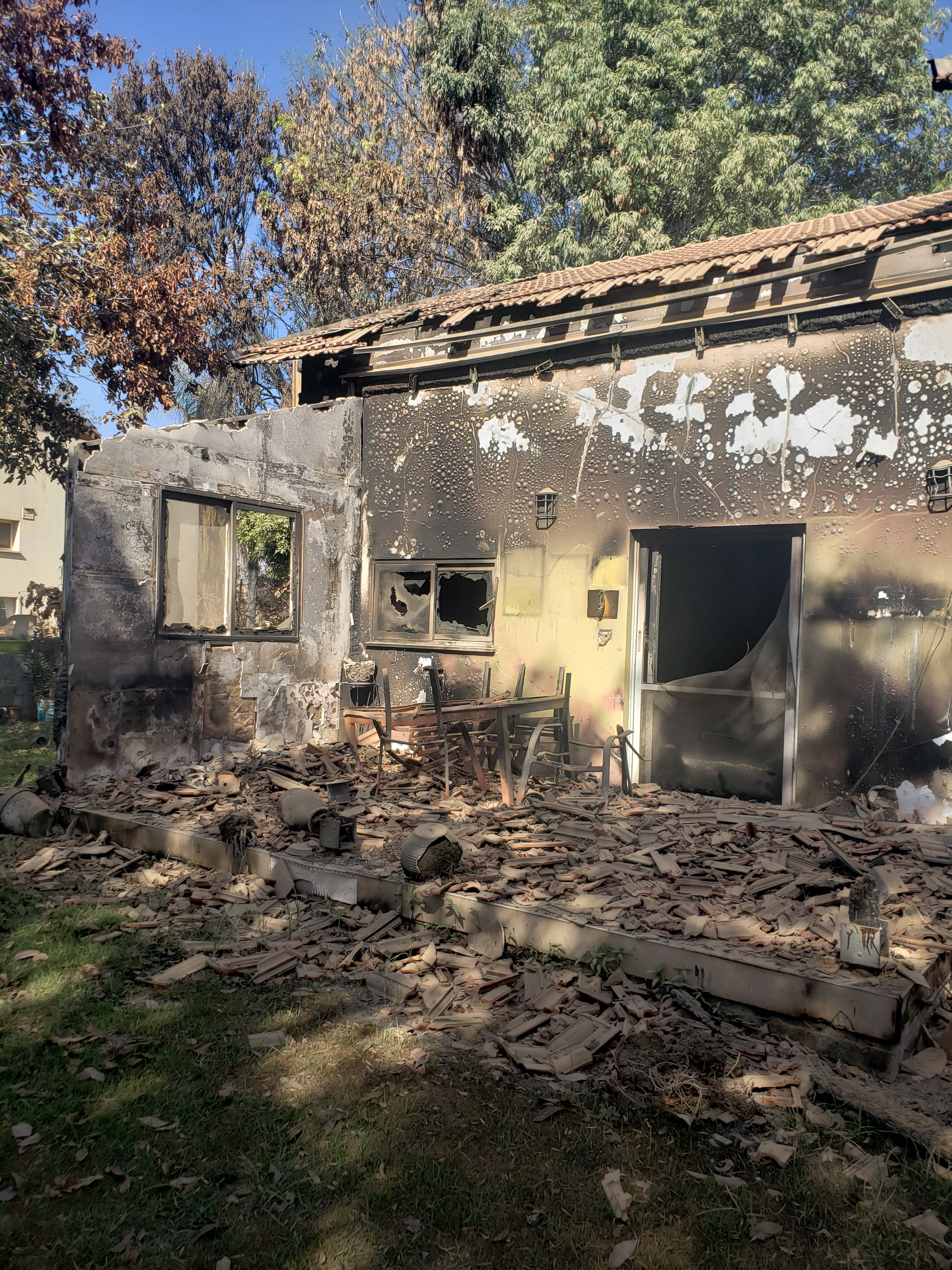
One of the many houses which was burned and destroyed during the attack

At 9:03 AM, 13 commandos from the elite Shaldag Unit of the Israeli Air Force arrived at Kibbutz Be'eri by helicopter. They would be the only IDF unit in Be'eri until about 1:30 PM. According to the IDF investigation, until that time there were 26 armed Israelis facing an estimated 340 attackers in the kibbutz. The Shaldag soldiers joined the fight alongside the residents. After one soldier was killed and another seriously wounded, the Shaldag team withdrew to the kibbutz entrance. The failure to continue fighting alongside the residents was later found by the IDF investigation to represent poor decision-making and a serious professional error. The Shaldag team repositioned itself at the entrance and killed several militants. They would later return to fight inside the kibbutz. Additional Shaldag forces later arrived. An Israeli CH-53D helicopter was destroyed on the ground by Hamas militants hours after the attack.

At 11:30 AM, civilians from the Gaza Strip began entering Be'eri to loot. The Nuseirat Battalion's 1st and 3rd companies arrived in the kibbutz at 12:15 PM. According to the IDF investigation, all of the hostages captured in Be'eri had been taken by 1 PM. Additional abductions were attempted after that time but were unsuccessful. At 1:30 PM, Sayeret Matkal commandos, who had been delayed after encountering militants on Route 232 as they approached the kibbutz, arrived in Be'eri. The Shaldag and Sayeret Matkal forces subsequently pushed into the kibbutz from opposite sides to clear out militants and rescue civilians. Meanwhile, the 890th Battalion of the 35th Paratroopers Brigade arrived in Be'eri and began to sweep the kibbutz.

More military and police forces arrived and joined the battle. At 4:15 PM, Brigadier General Barak Hiram, the commander of the 99th Infantry Division who had been appointed to command the forces in the Be'eri sector by IDF Chief of Staff Herzi Halevi hours earlier, arrived at the kibbutz. However, progress was hampered by a lack of coordination. The military investigation found that the lack of coordination led to large numbers of troops gathering outside the community and delaying their entry, with at times dozens of soldiers and police officers gathered in the parking lot awaiting instructions before joining the fight. Some troops were ordered to evacuate civilians instead of engage, others initially fought before withdrawing to evacuate wounded soldiers, and in some cases troops waited for their commanders to arrive before entering. Eight police officers were killed in an ambush by militants with RPGs as they drove around the kibbutz to reach its western side and join the fighting. In the evening, commanders briefed troops before sending them in to the kibbutz to avoid friendly fire incidents, causing a large buildup of forces outside the kibbutz. From 1:30 PM to 10:00 PM, Israeli forces advanced through the kibbutz and engaged in a series of gun battles with militants. According to the IDF investigation, the troops were careful not to open fire unless directly engaged in battle with militants, fearing the possibility of hitting civilians. Between 2:00 and 3:00 PM, the first civilians were evacuated, although most would be evacuated in the evening. At 5:00 PM, two tanks arrived in the kibbutz.

Between 10:00 PM and 5:00 AM on October 8, IDF troops continued to evacuate civilians and search for militants, although there were fewer engagements. The only suspected incident of friendly fire between troops during the fighting occurred overnight. Searches continued into the following day until the kibbutz was declared secured. The IDF reported that they had killed dozens of militants and freed all the hostages in Be'eri within 18 hours of the initial attack, but 48 hours later were still sweeping the kibbutz for Hamas holdouts. There were a number of clashes in the area with some militants still hiding out over the following days.

=== Hostage stand-off ===
A photo taken 6 weeks after the hostage standoff showing the remnants of the home which served as the location of the hostage standoff

A prominent incident during the fighting was a stand-off at the home of Pessi Cohen. According to a reconstruction of events by Independent International Commission of Inquiry on the Occupied Palestinian Territory, published in June 2024, at 12:56 PM, about 40 militants broke into the home of Pessi Cohen, killing a civilian and wounding another. The house was then used to concentrate some 15 abducted Israelis. Six were held in the yard and nine inside the house, although according to the IDF investigation one of them was already dead.

At around 3:00 PM, the Hamas commander, Hassan Hamduna, asked hostage Yasmin Porat, a survivor of the Re'im music festival massacre who had sought shelter in Be'eri after fleeing the site of the festival, to contact the police and negotiate a safe conduit for the militants and their hostages to Gaza. Hamduna instructed her to falsely tell the police that there were 50 hostages in the house. At 3:08 PM, the first call was made to police regarding hostages being held in Be'eri. Due to a miscommunication, the report was forwarded to troops on the scene as a hostage situation in the kibbutz dining hall. At 3:59 PM, one of the militants in the house called his superiors in Gaza and told them that the IDF had arrived. Meanwhile, militants in the house engaged forces from the Yamam police commando unit with RPG and machine gun fire. The Yamam commandos responded by firing a shoulder-launched missile at the house. Shortly afterward, Israeli commanders realized that the hostages were being held at Cohen's house and not in the dining hall. The house was then surrounded. Israeli forces on the scene were not able to see the hostages in the yard.

As the two tanks arrived at 5:00 PM, one of them headed for Cohen's house, crushing several Hamas pickup trucks that had apparently been intended to transport the hostages. Meanwhile, Hamduna, still in contact with the authorities by telephone, declared his desire to surrender. He eventually stripped and stepped outside, using Porat as a human shield. After being arrested, he agreed to hail the remaining militants on a loudspeaker and call on them to lay down their arms, but the standoff continued.

Brigadier General Barak Hiram, who by that time had arrived in Be'eri but was not present at Cohen's house, gave approval to fire light tank shells near and at the building to pressure the militants inside to surrender. He was subsequently accused of ordering tank shells fired at the house "even at the cost of civilian casualties" but the IDF investigation cleared him. Four tank shells were fired in total. Footage of two of the shells being fired was captured from a helicopter overhead.

At 5:33, Yamam and Shin Bet commanders ordered the first tank shell fired. It struck the pathway leading to the home. At 6:00 PM, Hiram arrived at the house and spoke to the Yamam commander on the site, ordering that the stand-off be finished within 40 minutes as the sun was setting. After about 20 minutes, Hiram left to handle other incidents in the ongoing battle. At 6:26 PM, Hamas commanders in Gaza called the militants holed up in the house, ordering them to run away. One minute later, the second tank shell was fired at the pathway. At 6:32 PM, the militants in the house told their superiors in Gaza that they would fight to the death. Two minutes later, the third shell was fired at the pathway. The shell bounced off the ground and hit the house just above the doorway, killing hostage Adi Dagan and injuring his wife Hadas Dagan. At 6:57 PM, the fourth shell was fired, hitting the roof of the house. The probe found that this too was aimed at applying pressure on the militants and not at harming anyone inside.

At 7:57 PM, a long burst of gunfire was heard, after which no sound was heard from the hostages. The commandos then entered the home, engaging in a gunbattle with the remaining militants. All but one of the hostages were killed, with Hadas Dagan being the only survivor.

A total of 13 hostages in the house were killed, among them two 12-year-old twins, Liel Hetzroni and Yanai Hetzroni, and their aunt, Ayala Hetzroni. Some of the hostages were slain by crossfire while in the garden. According to the investigations by the IDF Armored Corps and the Israel Antiquities Authority, most of the hostages were killed by shots from AK-47 rifles and not by the tank shelling. Hiram was absolved of any wrong-doing. The IDF probe did not definitively establish a cause of death for the 13 hostages, but found that most were likely murdered by the militants.

=== Elhanan Team ===
At around 6:00 PM, two Otniel residents, Captain (res.) Elhanan Meir Kalmanson and his brother Menachem Kalmanson, arrived independently at Be'eri and were joined a short time later by their nephew, Itiel Zohar. Dubbed the Elhanan Team, they evacuated over 100 residents of the kibbutz for 15 hours using an IDF armored vehicle they had found abandoned on a roadside. Elhanan was subsequently killed in an encounter with a militant during mopping up operations on the morning of October 8. In this engagement, Lt. Col. Eli Ginsberg, former commander of the LOTAR unit, was also killed. He had retired from the military two weeks prior but joined the fight in Be'eri. In parallel, Staff Sergeant Ofek Russo, a medic in the Shayetet 13 naval commando unit, was killed while treating a wounded soldier.

At a meeting between members of the kibbutz and the Kalmanson family after the Be'eri massacre, a letter from a kibbutz member was quoted about the Elchanan team's actions: "... Elchanan rescued us from the window of the shelter, while the house was burning ... after long hours of distress, he arrived like an angel and immediately instilled confidence in us. His face will remain etched in my heart forever ..."

== Casualties and unverified reports in the fog of war ==
A total of 101 Israeli civilians were killed in the attack. The victims included an 80-year-old man whose fingers had been cut off, multiple elderly people and a naked teenager found dead in the rubble. In addition, 31 Israeli security personnel were killed, of whom 18 were IDF soldiers, 8 were police officers, and 5 were members of the kibbutz security team. Many soldiers and civilians were also wounded. In addition, 32 Israeli civilians were abducted from Be'eri and taken to the Gaza Strip as hostages, of whom 30 were members of the kibbutz and two were civilians who had fled the Re'im music festival massacre and were taken captive in the area. A total of 125 houses in Be'eri were damaged or destroyed.

According to the IDF investigation, at least 100 Palestinian militants were killed in the fighting and 18 were captured alive.

The kibbutz suffered heavy losses of life and property. A resident later told The Times of Israel that the kibbutz was "completely destroyed". Some hostages were held captive for two days, until Israeli forces moved in on 9 October. A resident who was away at the time when the attack began said Israeli forces only gained control on Monday night, after commanders in the field made difficult decisions – including shelling houses with their occupants inside, without knowing whether the hostages inside them were dead or alive.^{a}

A UN report published in March 2024 said the UN team was unable to establish whether sexual violence occurred in Be’eri. It stated that at least two Be’eri cases reported in the press were determined to be "unfounded", including one where a crime scene had been altered and bodies moved, but added that the team also "received credible information" about bodies found naked, bound or gagged in Be’eri and that "circumstantial evidence – notably the pattern of female victims found undressed and bound – may be indicative of some forms of sexual violence."

=== Hetzroni family ===
Liel and Yanai Hetzroni were twins killed in the massacre and their deaths received significant media coverage due to their age and how they died. The twins were twelve years old and were burned alive inside their home along with their great-aunt Ayala Hetzroni. Forensic investigators identified Liel's remains after the massacre, initially thought to have been "burned beyond recognition." Before confirmation of her death, her relatives had a symbolic funeral, burying some of her personal belongings. After positive identification, she was laid to rest in Kibbutz Be'eri alongside other members of her family killed in the attack. Liel was eulogized at her funeral as "friendly and sensitive to all" and described as "a troublemaker with a pure heart, a girl with a huge laugh."

Yanai was remembered as "a lovely boy who was really coming into his own in terms of his character and personality" and a "very sporty child who loved tennis, football and basketball." Yanai's grandfather Avia was a volunteer with Magen David Adom and Yanai was remembered by MDA by accompanying his grandfather to help with various initiatives. On April 17, 2024, Rabbi Claire Magidovitch Green, Yanai's cousin dedicated that week's Torah portion to him as he would have been 13 that week and celebrated his Bar Mitzvah on that Saturday.

The Hetzronis' father believes they were murdered for being Jewish stating, "There was no other reason why these Hamas terrorists came in the kibbutz other than to kill, murder, maim Jewish children, babies, parents and old people all because they lived in the Jewish homeland."

=== Erroneous claims ===
Yossi Landau, regional head of the relief organisation ZAKA, stated to Sky News that around 80% of the bodies at Be'eri and Kfar Aza showed signs of torture, and that he found "two piles of ten children each were tied to the back, burnt to death" at Be'eri. Haaretz later found the claim regarding the tied children was erroneous, because the list of the dead at Be'eri only includes 9 children, and there are no cases known from Be'eri or any of the surrounding communities of children from several families having been murdered together. In January 2024, Kibbutz Be'eri also pushed back against a senior IDF commander's claim that eight babies were killed in the kibbutz's communal nursery and that an Auschwitz survivor called Genia was among those murdered during the attack. A kibbutz spokesperson said: "Nearly one hundred people were murdered on Kibbutz Be'eri, and the community suffered hundreds of heartbreaking incidents on that Black Saturday and over the past months, especially regarding the hostages. However, incidents such as eight murdered babies and a murdered Holocaust survivor named Genia – did not happen."

Survivors and first responders reported that some of the women from Be'eri suffered sexual violence during the attack. One highly publicized testimony, asserting that a pregnant woman had had her womb cut open and her fetus stabbed, was later shown to have been untrue; the kibbutz released a statement saying that "the story of the pregnant woman reported by Zaka is not relevant to Be'eri." Another case concerned teenage sisters murdered by Hamas and allegedly raped before being killed; a video taken by an Israeli soldier subsequently came to light contradicting an Israeli military paramedic's public testimony of what he found at the scene.

== Aftermath ==
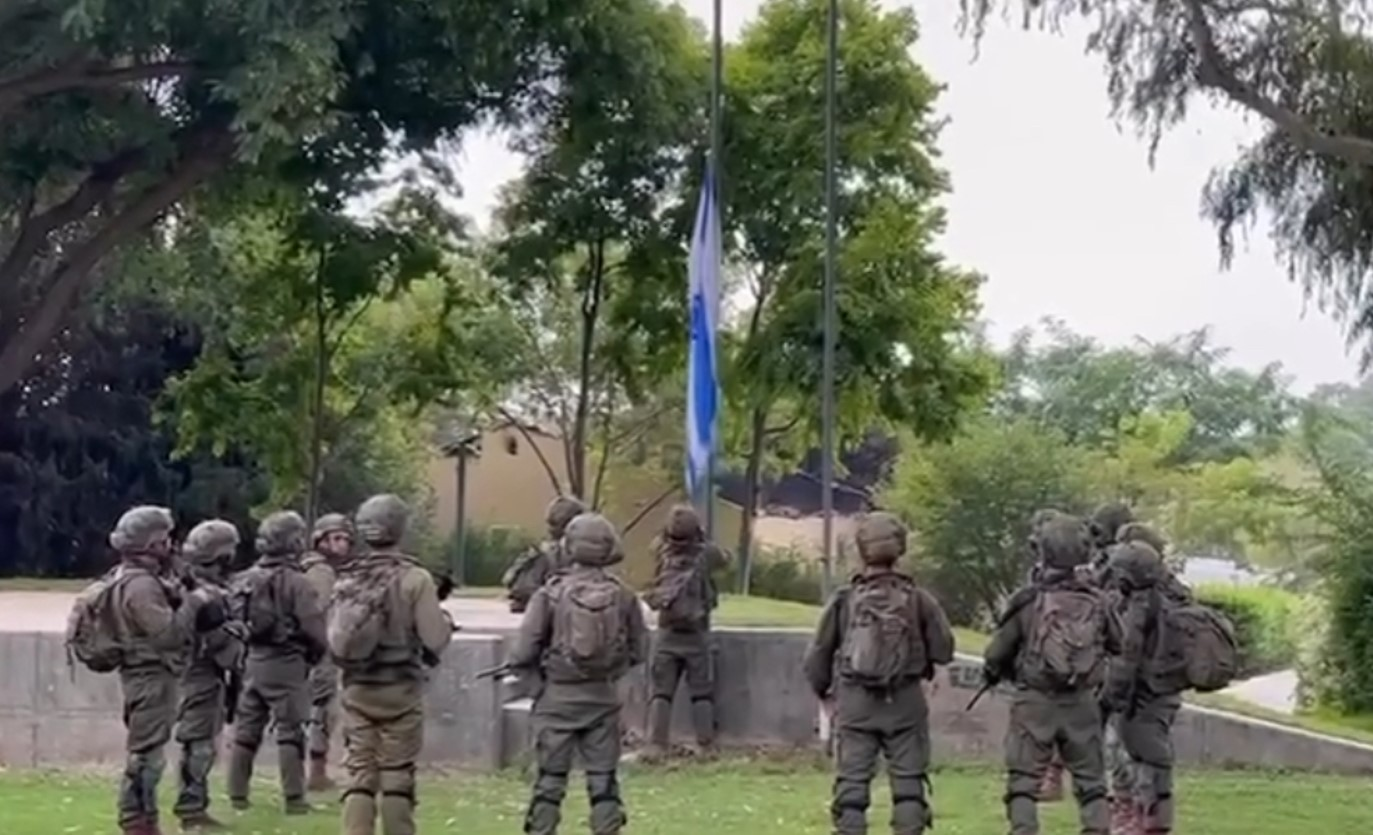
Israeli soldiers raising the Israeli flag in Be'eri after recapturing the kibbutz

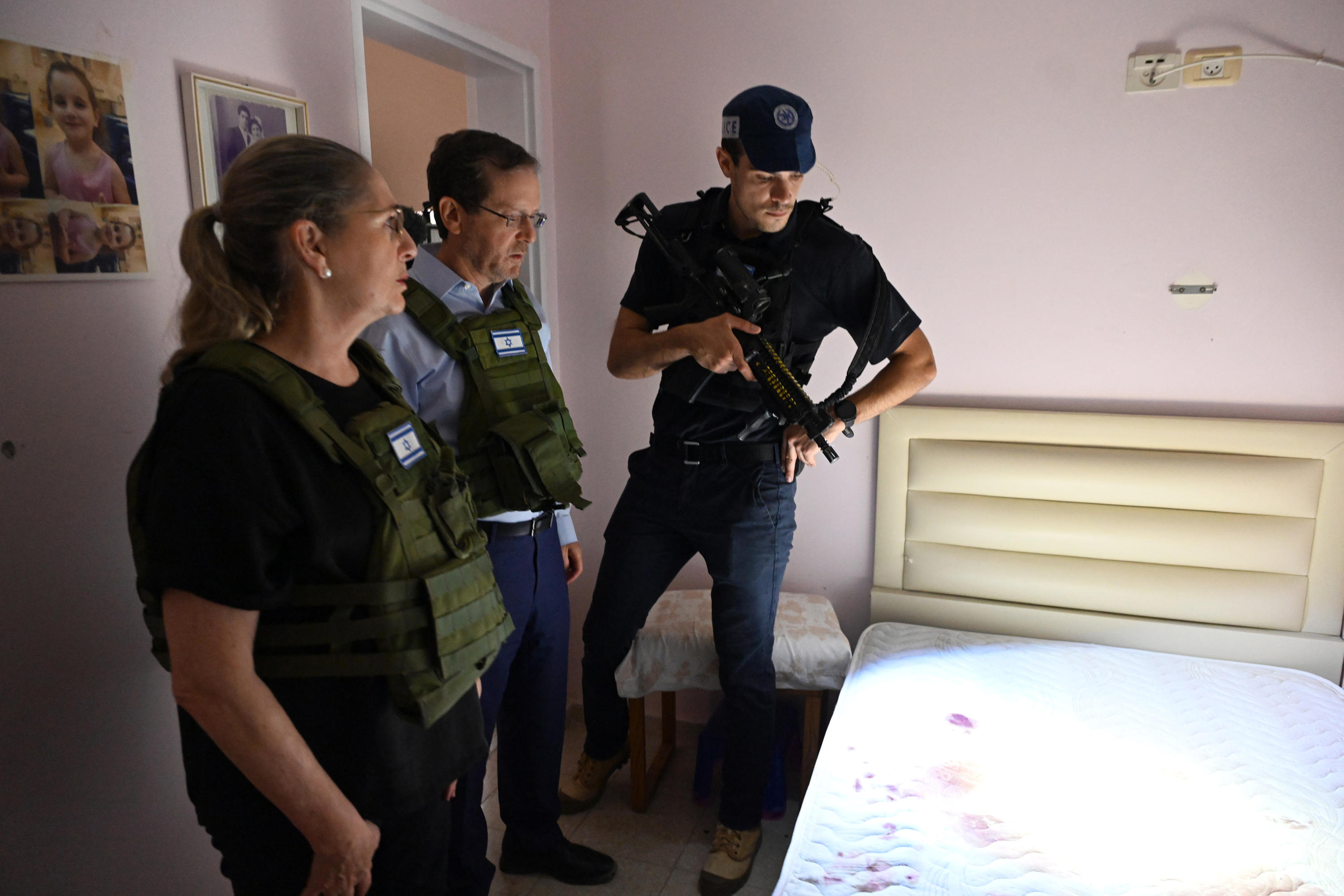
Israeli president Isaac Herzog and his wife, Michal, touring Be'eri on 15 October 2023.

On 24 October 2023, the IDF reportedly killed Abed al-Rahman, deputy commander of the Nuseirat Battalion, who had led the Be'eri massacre. On 6 January 2024, the IDF and Shin Bet announced that Ismail Siraj, the commander of the Nuseirat Battalion, and his new deputy Ahmed Wahaba, who had replaced Rahman, were killed in an airstrike.

In January 2024 it was announced that based on estimates from the Tkuma Administration which is leading the rehabilitation and development of the affected kibbutzim and Gaza periphery, the cost of rebuilding the kibbutz would be around $80 million. An internal survey of kibbutz survivors and evacuees in early 2024 showed that a very small percentage – less than 1% – have indicated that they never want to return to the kibbutz. About 20% said that they would return the minute they were given the green light from officials, while the majority of respondents indicated that their decision would depend on various factors, mostly clustered around security in the kibbutz and relations between Israel and the Gaza Strip.

=== Accusations of friendly fire during attack ===
Of the 14 hostages held at the Pessi Cohen house, only two survived: Yasmin Porat and Hadas Dagan. Porat said in interviews that an Israeli tank fired on a house in which several dozen militants were holding 14 hostages, including the 12-year-old twins. Porat had been able to leave the house with one of the militants who, wishing to surrender, had spoken on the phone to Israeli police, according to Porat, and been told to undress and leave the house with her. He did so, using Porat as a human shield, and was arrested; Porat then informed Israeli police of the number of hostages and hostage-takers left in the house. The militants unsuccessfully demanded safe passage from the Israeli army and police in order to return to the Gaza Strip with the hostages. They placed roughly half the hostages, including Dagan and her husband, in the backyard, between the house and the Israeli troops. The Hamas captors did this in order to slow down Israeli forces. Dagan and her husband lay down beside the wall of the house. In an ensuing gun battle, at least two hostages and one of the hostage-takers died, according to Dagan.

As dusk fell on October 7, an argument broke out between the Yamam commander and division commander General Barak Hiram, according to The New York Times; the Yamam commander believed more hostage-takers might surrender, but Hiram wanted the situation resolved by nightfall. After Hamas militants in the house fired a rocket-propelled grenade, Hiram ordered a tank commander to breach the house and the tank fired two shells. Of the 14 hostages left after Porat's departure, only Dagan survived the crossfire and shelling. Dagan said her husband was killed when shrapnel from the second tank shell entered his neck, severing an artery. Altogether, an IDF investigation later claimed, 12 of the 13 hostages were killed by Hamas before all the militants were killed.

The Times report led to a public debate in Israel on the appropriateness of General Hiram's conduct. In January 2024, relatives of the victims delivered a letter to the military in which they said that "according to the evidence, the shooting of the tank was fatal and killed many hostages in addition to the terrorists" and demanded a "comprehensive and transparent probe into the decisions and actions that led to this tragic outcome". The families also prevented the demolition of the house in question, to enable an investigation to take place. Haaretz asked the IDF in an editorial to disclose whether or not the decision to fire on the house was an application of Israel's controversial Hannibal Directive.

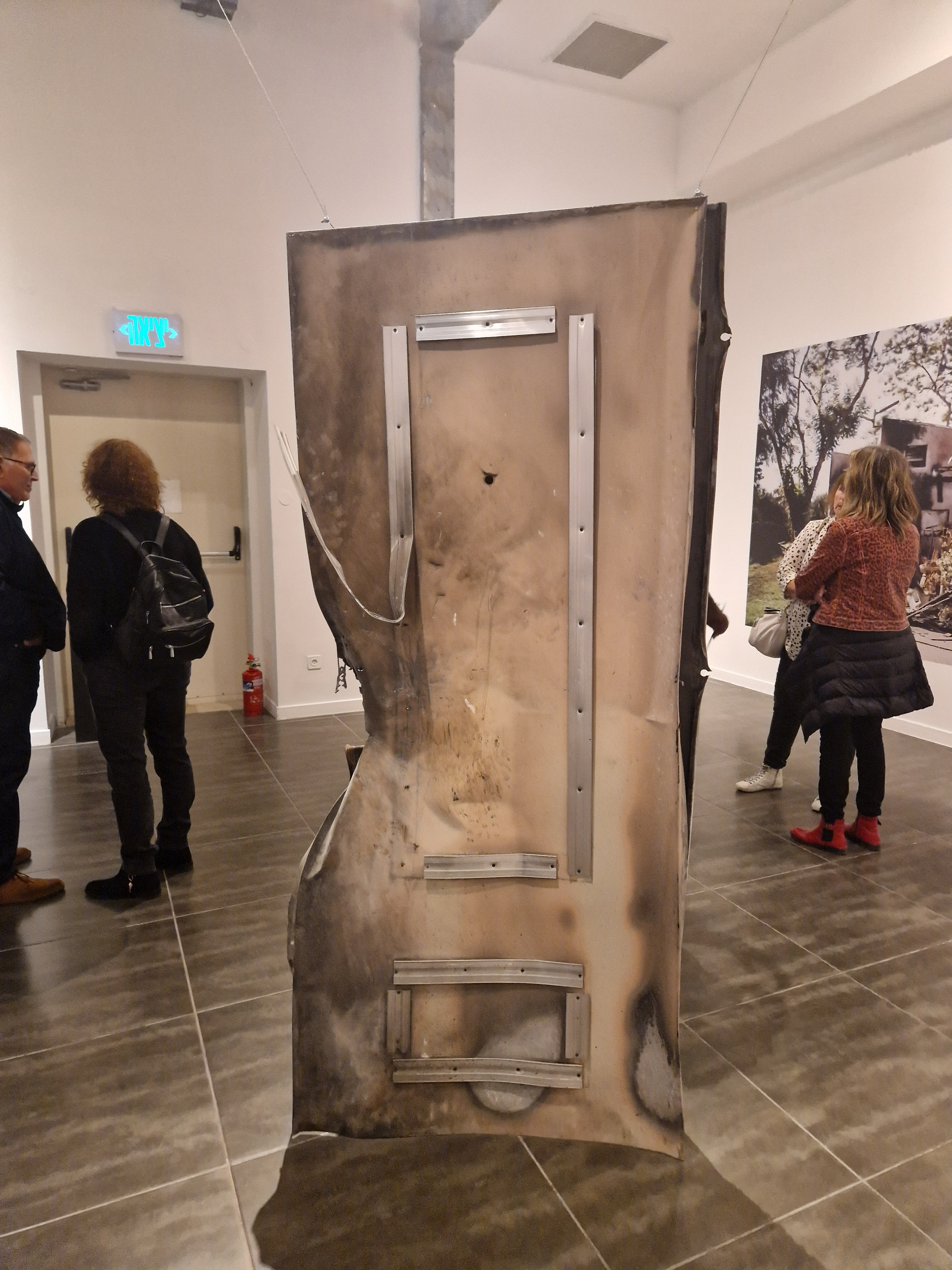
A broken metal door that was included in the photograph exhibition

The results of an IDF probe published in July 2024 said that at 5:20 P.M., a decision was made to use tank fire. At 5:53, before Hiram's arrival, a shaped charge was fired by a tank and struck the path between two houses. At 6 P.M., Hiram arrived on the scene and approved tank fire, including shells, out of concern that the terrorists might manage to flee under the increasing cover of darkness. At 6:32 P.M., the terrorists said they intended to kill themselves. By 7 P.M., three further shells were fired, among them one aimed at the floor and one at the attic of the house. The IDF estimated shrapnel from those shells hit Adi Dagan, who was killed, and Hadas Dagan, who was wounded. The IDF concluded most hostages were killed by the terrorists rather than the shells. Be'eri residents responded by demanding a state commission of inquiry to look at all aspects of the IDF's actions in Be'eri that day.

=== Depiction in media ===
In November 2023, an exhibition about the massacre and the resulting damage was opened at the Haifa City Museum which includes photographs taken in the kibbutz after the attack and as well as collected items to show the scale of destruction. Also in November 2023, art and video works retrieved from the gallery in the kibbutz were removed and displayed at the National Museum of 21st Century Arts in Rome as part of an exhibit entitled "Ninety-five percent heaven, five percent hell" as part of the cultural attaché of the Israeli Embassy in Italy.

Landscapes of the kibbutz were created by resident Haran Keslo, and recovered from the kibbutz after the attack. They were displayed at the Haim Atar Ein Harod Art Center and had been created over between about 2020 and 2023.

== See also ==
- Re'im music festival massacre
- List of massacres in Israel
- List of massacres during the 2023 Israel–Hamas war
- Outline of the Gaza war
- Palestinian political violence
- Moshe Dayan's eulogy for Ro'i Rothberg

== Notes ==
^ Note a: Note changes in later archive versions of the article:,
