= Israa University (Palestine) =

University in the Gaza Strip

- Established: 2014 (12 years ago)
- Types: university
- Country: Palestine
- Coordinates: 31°31′24″N 34°27′08″E
- Website: israa.edu.ps/en

Israa University (also Isra University, al-Israa University or al-Isra University) was a university in the Gaza Strip, Palestine created in 2014. Its main building was occupied for 70 days and physically destroyed by explosives on 17 January 2024 by Israeli armed forces, during the Gaza war.

== History ==
Al-Israa University was established in 2014, following the creation of other new Palestinian universities such as University of Palestine. The university boasted a well-ranked clinical psychology program. Women outnumbered men at the school and were represented approximately equally in STEM-related concentrations.

=== Use as Israeli base and destruction during Gaza war ===
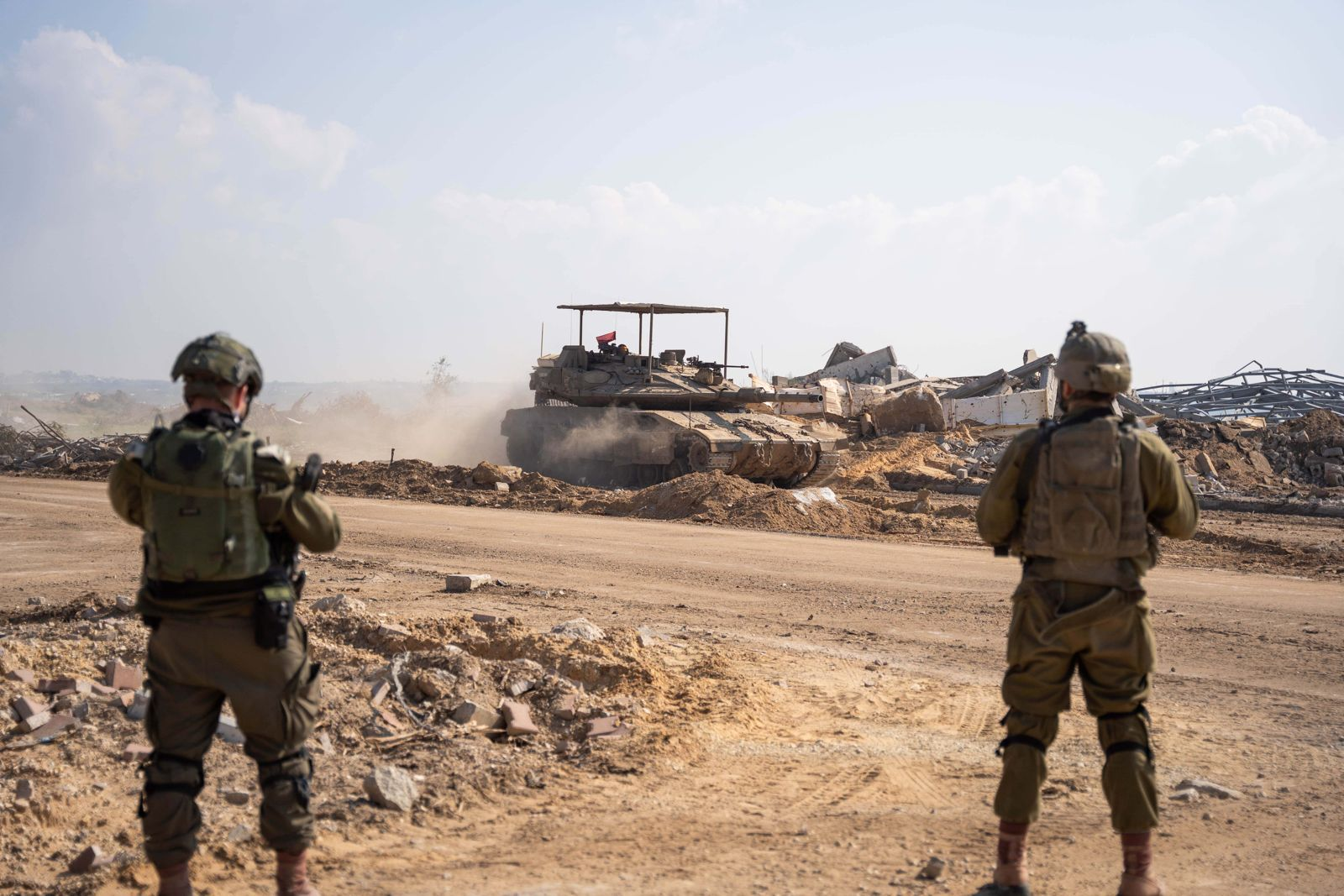
Israeli military inspecting the destroyed university, February 2024

During the Gaza war, the building housing al-Israa University was occupied and converted to military barracks by Israel military forces for 70 days. According to university administrators, the building was used by the Israeli forces as a base for snipers for shooting civilians in Rashid, al-Mughraqa and al-Zahra streets and as a detention centre. On 17 January 2024, the Israel Defense Forces (IDF) destroyed the main university building through a controlled demolition after having used the premises as a military base for several weeks. It was seen as completing the destruction or near-destruction of all higher education buildings in Gaza Strip by Times Higher Education. Samia al-Botmeh of Birzeit University interpreted the completion of the destruction of the buildings as "part of [an] overarching strategy of the destruction of every aspect of services in Gaza that make life there possible". Israa University stated that occupying forces took over 3,000 artifacts from its museum prior to the university building's destruction.

In March 2024, the IDF claimed that the facilities and its surroundings had been used by Hamas fighters as staging grounds for attacks, rendering the university a legitimate military target. On 11 March 2024, Israeli authorities announced that the commander of the Israeli 99th Infantry Division, Brigadier general Barak Hiram, had been formally censured by the Israeli military for demolishing the university building without proper authorisation. The IDF said there had been "flaws in the operational process, including in the decision to destroy the entire building."

== Organisation ==
=== Leadership ===
As of January 2024, the vice president of the university was Ahmed Alhussaina.

=== Faculties ===
Al-Israa University includes a Law Faculty. Cooperation between the Law Faculty and the Palestinian Center for the Independence of the Judiciary and the Legal Profession took place in 2019 on issues including the proposed Palestinian Basic Law and human rights and the right to a fair trial.

=== Demographics ===
Before its demolition in 2024, there were more female students enrolled at the university than male students.
