= Eli Ginsberg =

Israeli military officer (d. 2023)

- אלי גינסברג
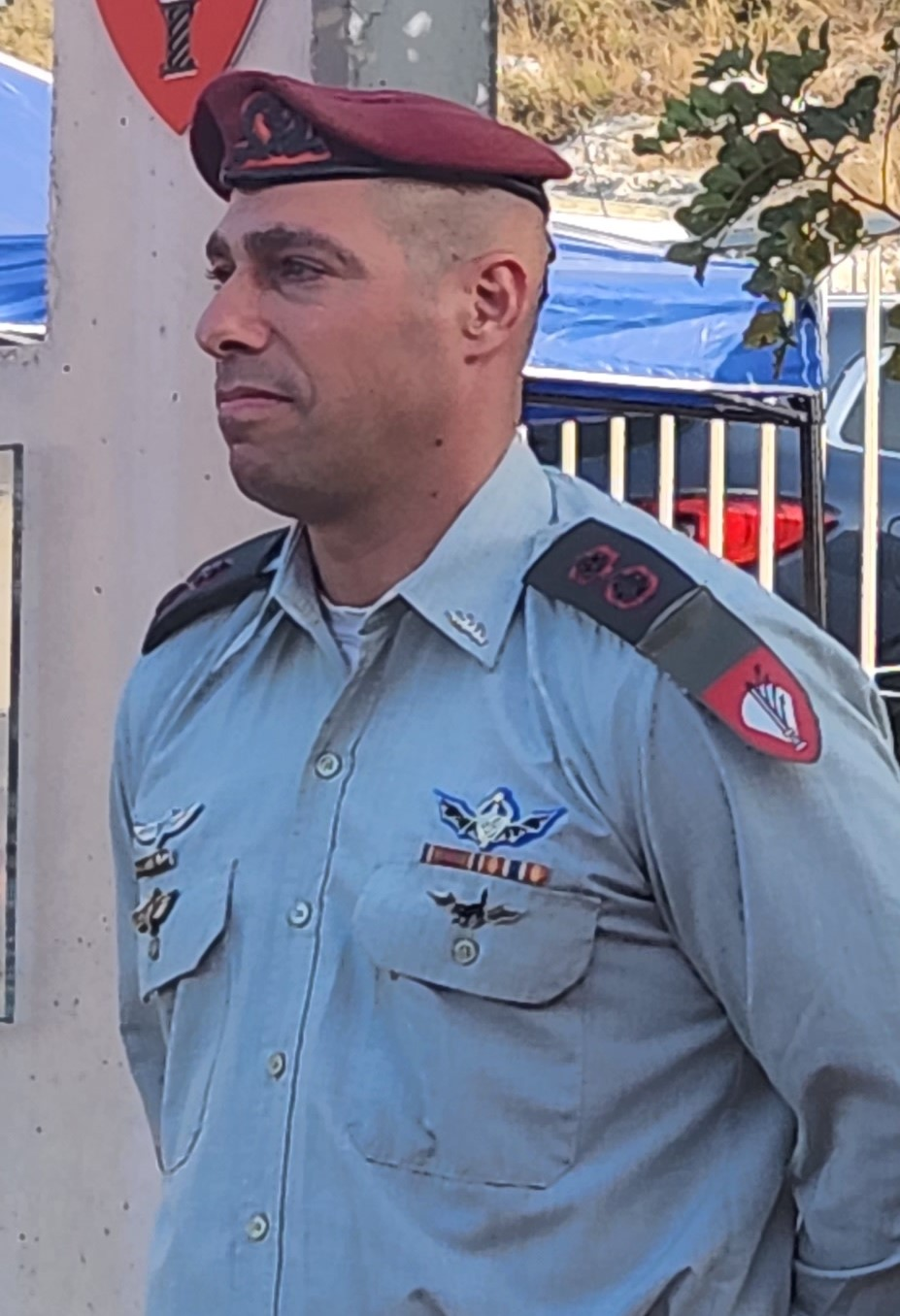
- Born: September 28, 1981; Misgav Am, Israel
- Died: October 8, 2023 (aged 42); Be'eri, Israel
- Military career
- Allegiance: Israel
- Branch: Israel Defense Forces
- Service years: 2001–2023
- Rank: Sgan Aluf (Lieutenant colonel)
- Conflicts: 2006 Lebanon War; Gaza War (2008-2009); 2012 Gaza War; 2014 Gaza War; 2021 Israel-Palestine crisis; Gaza war

Eli Ginsberg (Hebrew: אלי גינסברג; c. 1981 – 8 October 2023) was an Israeli lieutenant colonel who commanded the LOTAR special forces counterterrorism unit of the Israel Defense Forces from 2020 to 2023. Two weeks after his retirement from the military, Ginsberg was killed in action during the October 7 attacks on 8 October. After hearing of the initial incursion by Hamas, Ginsberg drove from Dovrat, the kibbutz in northern Israel where he lived with his wife and four children, to participate in the Battle of Be'eri.

During his IDF career, Ginsberg was an officer in the Israeli Navy's Shayetet 13 special operations unit and was wounded during the 2010 Gaza flotilla raid.

Ginsberg had resided with his family in Dovrat since 2015 and served as the kibbutz's security coordinator.
