= Nahshon Battalion =

Nahshon is an urban warfare-trained infantry battalion in the Israel Defense Forces tasked with patrolling the area of Nablus in the West Bank.

== History ==
The battalion motto is "Be first, Nahshon," referring to the Prince of Judah, Nahshon. It is a part of the Kfir Brigade.

Nahshon began as a company in November 1998 and was reformed as a battalion in 1999–2000. Its founding commander was Lt. Col. Yoram Loredo. During the Second Intifada it lost six men, including four officers. It is one of six other such battalions who since the 1990s have commanded separate sections of territory in the West Bank to prevent suicide bombings and maintain order. The current commander is Lt. Col. Tamir Shalom.

The unit was ordered to disband by the commander of the Kfir Brigade in 2012 following the hospitalisation of one soldier after beating by his colleagues in a hazing incident. The unit was in existence in 2020 when it entered isolation during the Covid-19 pandemic.

The unit served with the Kfir Brigade in the Gaza war with at least threesoldiers killed and others wounded, including a lieutenant-colonel, in northern Gaza in November 2024.
