= Gefen Brigade =

7643rd "Gefen" Brigade
- חטיבת הגפן
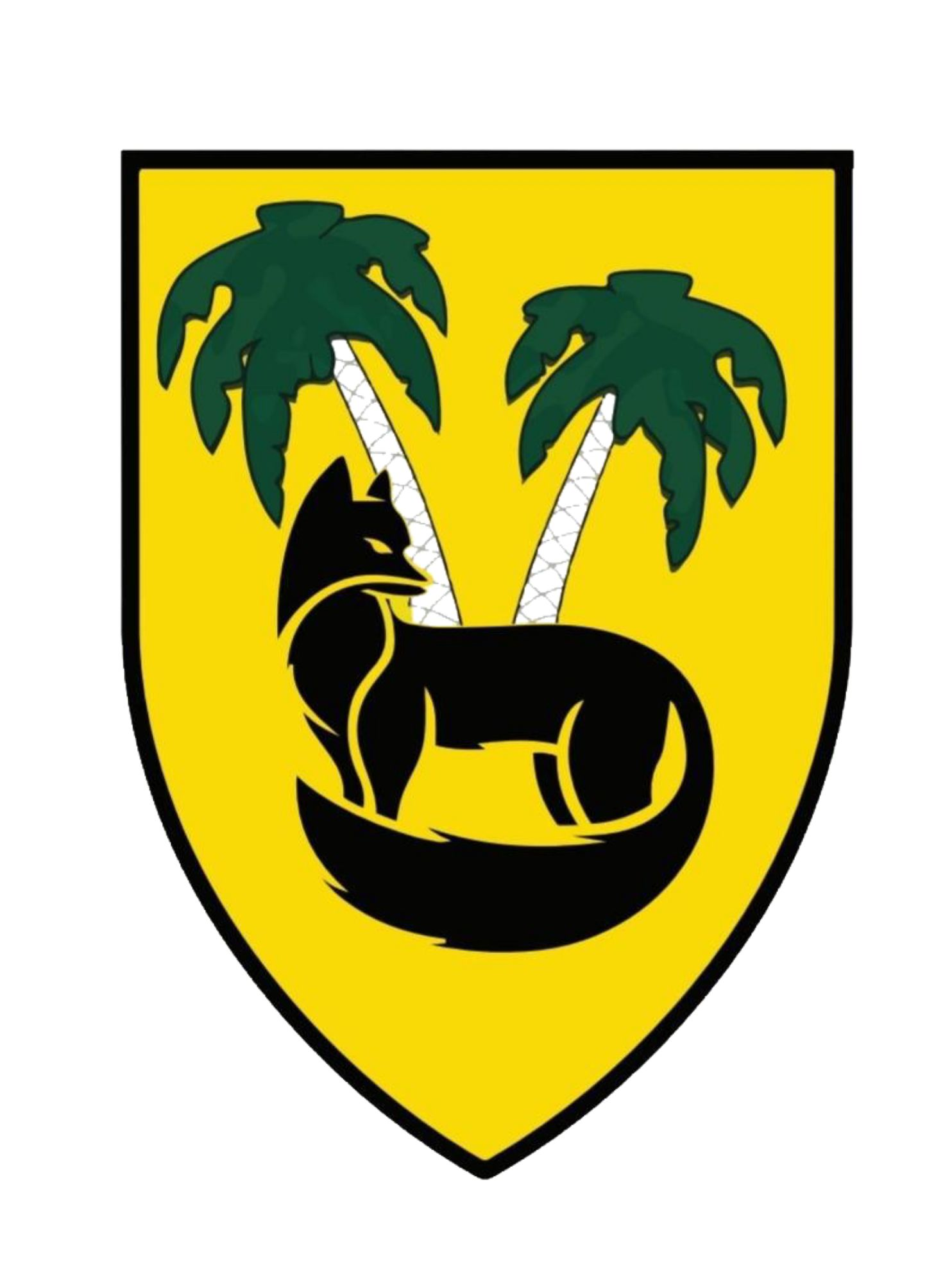
- Brigade patch
- Active: 1988–present
- Country: Israel
- Branch: Israel Defense Forces: Israeli Ground Forces
- Type: Infantry
- Part of: Gaza Division, Israeli Southern Command
- Mascot: Fox
- Engagements: Israeli-Palestinian conflict; First Intifada; Western Wall Tunnel riots; Second Intifada; Operation Rainbow; Operation Front Shield; Operation Days of Penitence; Gaza War (2008–09); Operation Cast Lead; Operation Hot Winter; Operation Protective Edge; Gaza war; October 7 attacks; Nova music festival massacre; Invasion of the Gaza Strip; Battle of Beit Hanoun

Commanders
- Current commander: Colonel Omri Mashiach
- Notable commanders: #Commanders

The 7643rd Gefen Brigade (Hebrew: חטיבת הגפן, lit. '"Grapevine Brigade"'), also called the Northern Brigade in the Gaza Strip, is a brigade belonging to the Gaza Division of the Israeli Ground Forces. It was established about an year after the outbreak of the First Intifada in 1988, in order to respond to the operational need created by the concentration of forces in the zone. The brigade was located in the center of Gaza City and was entrusted with the security of Gaza City and its surroundings, as well as with the security of the Israeli settlements in the north of the Strip and the Erez Crossing. After the Oslo Accords and the Gaza-Jericho Agreement, IDF forces withdrew from the city centers and the brigade was transferred to Re'im.

== History ==
The brigade was established approximately a year after the outbreak of the First Intifada, in 1988, to respond to operational needs by creating a concentration of forces in an operational area. The brigade was based in central Gaza City and tasked with guarding the city and its surrounding area, as well as securing northern Israeli settlements in the Gaza Strip and the Erez crossing. Following the Oslo Accords and the Gaza–Jericho Agreement, beginning in 1994, the IDF withdrew from city centers, and the brigade evacuated Gaza City and settled near Nisanit. Today, the brigade's headquarters is located in a divisional camp near Kibbutz Re'im.

During the Western Wall Tunnel riots, its commander, Nabia Mari, was killed.

During the Second Intifada, the brigade was involved directly in clashes with Palestinian militants, with its commander, Hamada Ghanem, killing militants himself in combat.

In 2004, Colonel Avi Levi led the brigade during the 2004 Israeli operation in the northern Gaza Strip, guarding the Erez crossing and protecting it from attacks, including the foiling of a suicide attack, in both the Front Shield and Days of Atonement series of operations. It conducted various raids against militants to prevent rocket fire from the Gaza Strip into Israel, including in Beit Hanoun and Jabaliya. It participated in Operation Cast Lead under Col. Ron Asherov in 2008. It then also partook in Operation Protective Edge, during which Battalion 969 was added to the Brigade's composition. Lieutenant General Dolev Keidar, commander of the brigade, and two personnel of the brigade were killed in combat in Nir Am.

Under Haim Cohen, the brigade saw extensive combat in the Gaza War from day one. The Brigade arrived at the scene a few hours before the attack began after receiving new information about situation assessments. At 5 am, its commander arrived at the Nova party, but decided not to disperse it despite warnings regarding the high number of participants and the lack of security. Shortly after, 378 people were killed and 44 were taken hostage in the largest terrorist attack in Israel's history. The commander was to be dismissed by Defense Minister Israel Katz, but the victims' families intervened on his behalf to prevent dismissal. In April 2024, it conducted operations in Beit Hanoun. On 10 April 2025, Omri Mashiach was appointed the commander of the brigade. The 843rd Nir Armored Battalion was established as a part of the brigade in May 2025. The battalion is stationed in the Zikim sector and consists of regular armored companies that rotate every few months. The goal of the establishment was to reduce the reliance on reserve battalions that operated intensively in the Gaza Strip during the Gaza War, and to establish a regular and stable array of armored fighters in the southern sector. In December 2025, it dismantled Hamas tunnels in the Gaza strip and killed violators of the Gaza peace plan at the yellow line; it destroyed further tunnels in January 2026.

== Commanders ==
- Danny Topus
- Miron Keren
- Israel Ziv (1991–1993)
- Shaul Arieli (1993–1994)
- Nabia Mari (1994–1996 †)
- Mada Hasbani (1996–1998)
- David Ohana (1998–2000)
- Hamada Ghanem (2000–2002)
- Joel Strick (2002–2004)
- Avi Levi (2004–2005)
- Moni Katz (2005–2007)
- Ron Ashrov (2007–2009)
- Ofer Levi (2009–2011)
- Ofer Winter (2011–2013)
- Yaron Finkelman (2013–2015)
- Yaki Dolph (2015–2017)
- Avi Rosenfeld (July 2017–May 2019)
- Yoav Brunner (May 2019–August 2021)
- Ami Biton (31 August 2021 – 17 April 2023)
- Haim Cohen (17 April 2023 – 10 April 2025)
- Omri Mashiach (10 April 2025–)

== Structure ==
- 7643rd Territorial Brigade "Gefen" (Northern Gaza)
  - 585th Desert Reconnaissance Battalion
  - 843rd Armored Battalion "Nir"
  - 969th Infantry Battalion (Reserve)
  - 5033rd Infantry Battalion (Reserve)
  - 8239th Infantry Battalion (Reserve)
  - Combat Engineer Company "Steel Cats"
  - Signal Company
  - Logistic Battalion
