= Barak Hiram =

Israeli military officer

- בָּרָק חִירָם
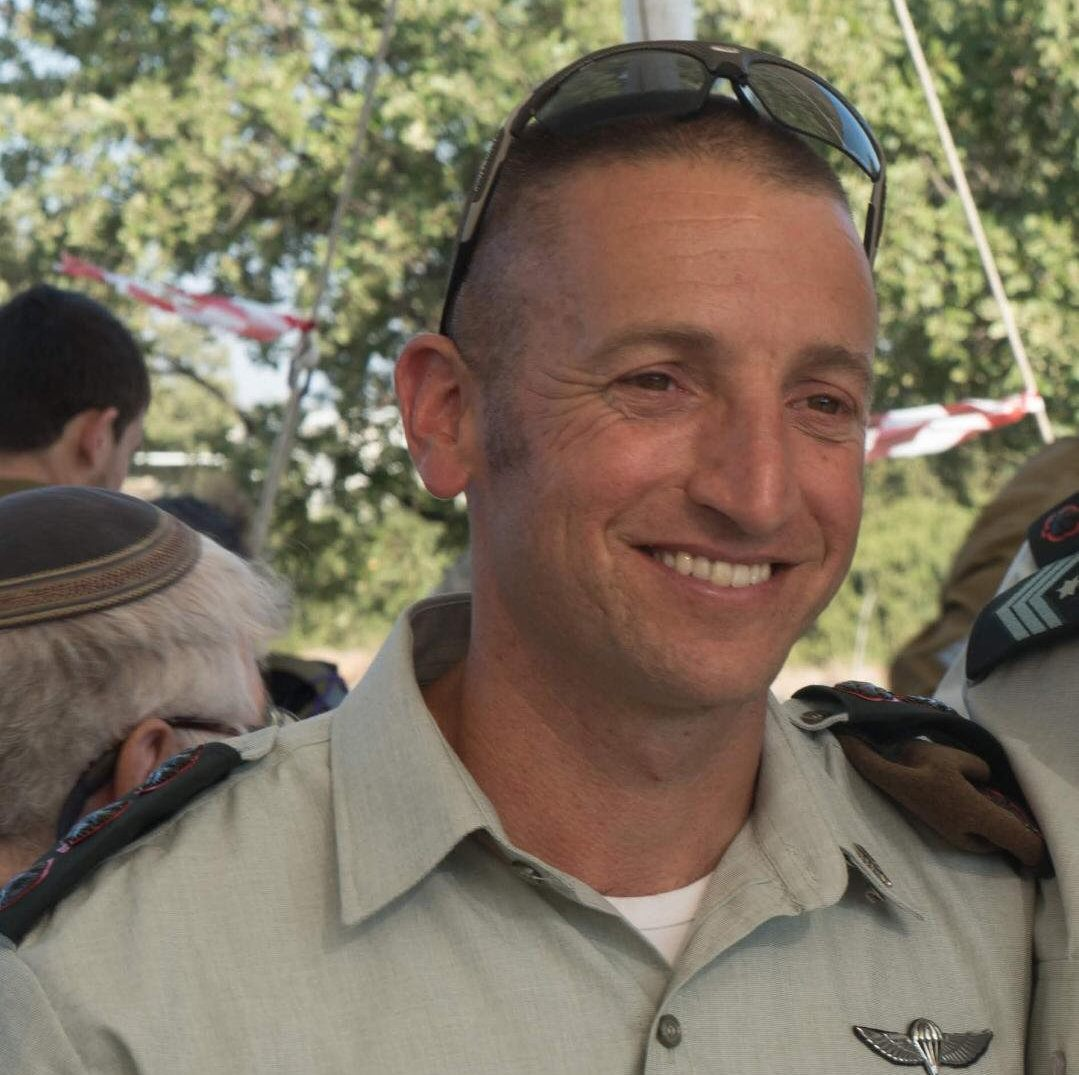
- Barak Hiram in 2019
- Born: 1979 (age 46–47); Israel
- Military career
- Allegiance: Israel
- Branch: Israel Defense Forces
- Service years: 1997–present
- Rank: Brigadier general
- Conflicts: Second Intifada; 2006 Lebanon War; Operation Cast Lead; Operation Pillar of Defense; Operation Protective Edge; Operation Guardian of the Walls; Gaza war

Barak Hiram (Hebrew: בָּרָק חִירָם; born in 1979) is an IDF officer with the rank of Brigadier general, currently serving as the commander of the Gaza Division. Previously, he served as the commander of the 99th Infantry Division, the Golani Brigade, the commander of the live-fire training center in the IDF, the commander of the Golani Brigade, the commander of Golani's training base, and the commander of Battalion 51.

== Biography ==
Hiram was born and raised in Haifa. He studied at the Reali School in his city of residence. He enlisted in the IDF in 1997 and began his service in the pilots' course. After five months, he dropped out of the course, was placed in the Golani Brigade, and was accepted into the Egoz unit. He underwent training as a fighter and an infantry commanders' course, returned to the unit as a team sergeant, and participated in combat in South Lebanon. After an infantry officers' course, he was appointed as a team commander in the unit. Later, he served as the operational company commander in Battalion 13 and led it, among other things, in combat in the Gaza Strip. He was then appointed as the commander in the Egoz unit and commanded it during the Second Lebanon War. During the fighting, he was seriously injured and lost one of his eyes. For the way he fought and commanded the company, he was awarded a commendation by the division commander from the Gaash formation. Later, he served as the commander of the training school in the Egoz unit. In 2008–2009, he served as the deputy commander of Battalion 12. After the death of his successor, Eliraz Peretz, he returned for a while to serve as the deputy commander of the battalion. He was later appointed as the cycle commander in the Golani training base. He then went abroad for studies.

On June 25, 2012, he was promoted to the rank of Lieutenant colonel and appointed as the commander of Battalion 51, serving in this role until July 6, 2014. In July 2014, he was appointed as the commander of Golani's training base, serving in this role until August 2016. On September 1, 2016, he was promoted to the rank of colonel and appointed as the commander of the Golan Brigade, a position he held until July 15, 2018. He then went abroad for a year of studies. In 2019, he was appointed as the commander of the live-fire training center in the IDF, a role he held until 2020. On August 2, 2020, he was appointed as the commander of the Golani Brigade, serving in this position until July 18, 2022.

On August 11, 2022, he was promoted to the rank of Brigadier general and appointed as the commander of the 99th Infantry Division. On July 17, 2023, it was decided to appoint him as the next commander of the Gaza Division.

== Gaza war ==
On Saturday, 7 October 2023, with the start of a surprise attack on Israel, he traveled on his own initiative to the Southern Command. Hiram was instructed to engage in combat with militiamen in Netivot. He ordered the entire division to assemble in Beit Kama, arrived in Netivot with a small force and took command of the fighting in the two communities, alongside the communities of Sa'ad, Be'eri, Alumim, and Re'im. Forces from various units (Sayeret Matkal, Shaldag Unit, Commando Brigade) later arrived in the area and were directed by Hiram to zones of combat in the different communities.

At 11 AM, he arrived with his team in Alumim, where the readiness company managed to defend the village, and the force under his command killed three militiamen. Shortly after, he continued with fighters from various units to Kibbutz Be'eri, where a long and casualty-heavy battle ensued until Monday afternoon. During the fighting at Be'eri, Hiram reportedly ordered a tank to fire on a house where Hamas militiamen were holding 14 Israeli civilians hostage. Hiram was accused of killing the hostages civilians with the hostage-takers which called for a probe into his actions. The probe as well as a separate investigation by the Antiquities Authority eventually cleared him "with investigators concluding that the hostages were killed by AK-47 rifles, not a tank shell." These findings directly contradict the testimonies of the 2 remaining survivors, Yasmin Porat and Hadas Dagan who said "They eliminated everyone, including the hostages"

and "When those two shells hit, [Liel] stopped screaming. There was silence then.

".

During the Israeli campaign in Gaza, Hiram was formally censured by the IDF for ordering the demolition of Israa University in the Gaza Strip. While an IDF investigation claimed that the university grounds were being used by Hamas fighters, it also found that Hiram failed to secure proper authorization for destroying a sensitive educational site.

== Personal life ==
Hiram is a father of four. He holds a bachelor's degree in military history from the Hebrew University of Jerusalem and a master's degree in business administration from Ben-Gurion University of the Negev.
