= Desert Reconnaissance Battalion =

Unit of Israel Defense Forces

585th Desert Reconnaissance Battalion
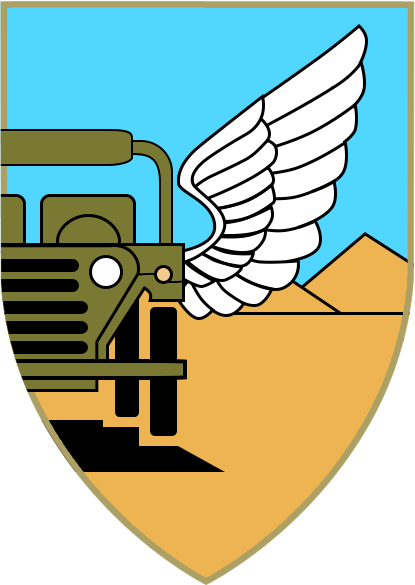
- Battalion insignia
- Active: Late 1980s-present
- Country: Israel
- Branch: Ground Forces
- Type: Armoured cavalry
- Size: Battalion
- Part of: 7643rd Territorial Brigade "Gefen", 143rd "Fire Fox" Division

The Desert Reconnaissance Battalion (DRB) (also known as Unit 585 or the Bedouin Battalion) is an armoured cavalry unit of the 7643rd Territorial Brigade "Gefen", 143rd "Fire Fox" Division that specializes in controlling and surveillance of immigrants crossing the border illegally, CQB/CQC in urban areas, patrolling with armed armored vehicles to maintain border security, raiding with maneuver warfare tactics and small unit tactics, support counterinsurgency, and tracking targets in border areas.

It is an ethnic minority unit consisting of volunteers from the Bedouin, Christian, Muslim ethnoreligious groups, while the majority of the IDF and the Israeli population are Jews. The DRB was founded in the late 1980s and since then has largely been deployed on the border with the Gaza Strip on security duties.

== Description ==
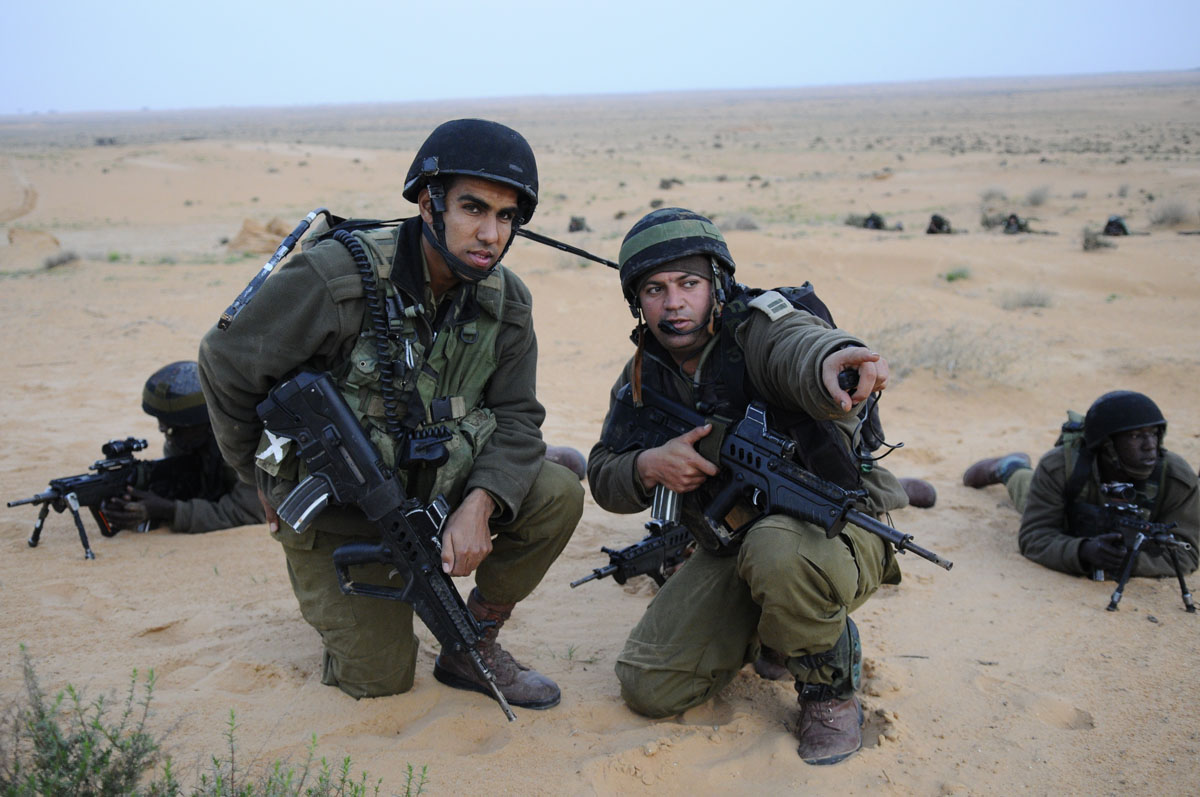
Two DRB members pictured on an exercise, 2012

The Desert Reconnaissance Battalion (DRB), also known as Unit 585, was one of three ethnic minority units in the Israel Defense Forces (IDF). The others are the Sword Battalion for the Druze and the Bedouin Trackers. The Sword Battalion has since been disbanded.

The vast majority of the service personnel in the IDF are Jews, the predominant ethnoreligious group in Israel, who along with the Druze and Circassians are subject to compulsory service. Other groups are able to volunteer in the IDF and the DRB includes Bedouin, Christians, Muslims, Druse and Circassians.

The majority in the DRB are Bedouin and the unit is sometimes referred to as the "Bedouin Battalion". Most of the Arabs in the IDF are Bedouins from the Negev. Around 80% of the Naqab Bedouin recruits elect to serve in the DRB or the Bedouin Trackers, with most selecting the DRB.

Around 1,500 Bedouin currently serve in the IDF, though the leadership have made efforts to increase this number. Since the founding of the state in 1948 more than 110 Bedouin have been killed while serving in the IDF.

== Operational history ==
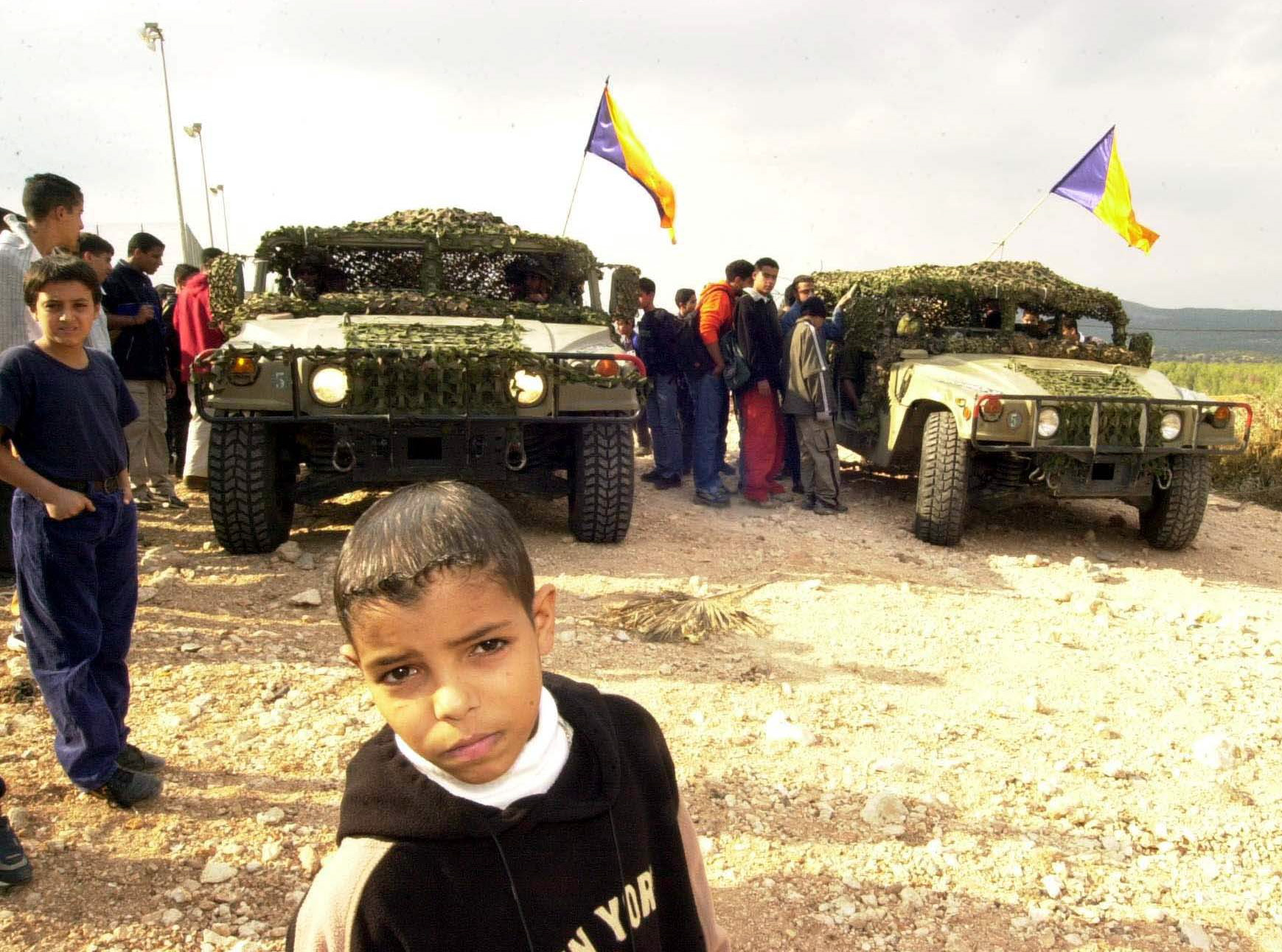
DRB Humvees

The DRB was founded in the late 1980s. It has largely served on the border between Israel and the Gaza Strip. It has a base nearby at Kissufim. The battalion serves alongside the Bedouin Trackers on patrols, using tracking techniques to search for terrorists and to prevent infiltration of the border. Because some members face threats and harassment from members of their community, they are permitted to travel to and from duty out of uniform.

The Desert Reconnaissance Battalion is equipped with MDT David light armoured personnel carriers, Wolf Armoured Vehicles and Humvees. It is part of the 143rd "Fire Fox" (Territorial) Division of Southern Command.

For much of its history, the Desert Reconnaissance Battalion had been deployed to the dangerous Rafah Border Crossing. Five soldiers of the battalion were killed there in 2004, after which the Israeli newspaper Haaretz asked whether the unit had been assigned this post due to the perceived lower social standing of its soldiers. It had spent the preceding four years at Rafah, while other frontline units were rotated through the post. The unit's first Bedouin commanding officer was appointed in December 2004.
