= Gaza Division =

143rd Division "Firefox"
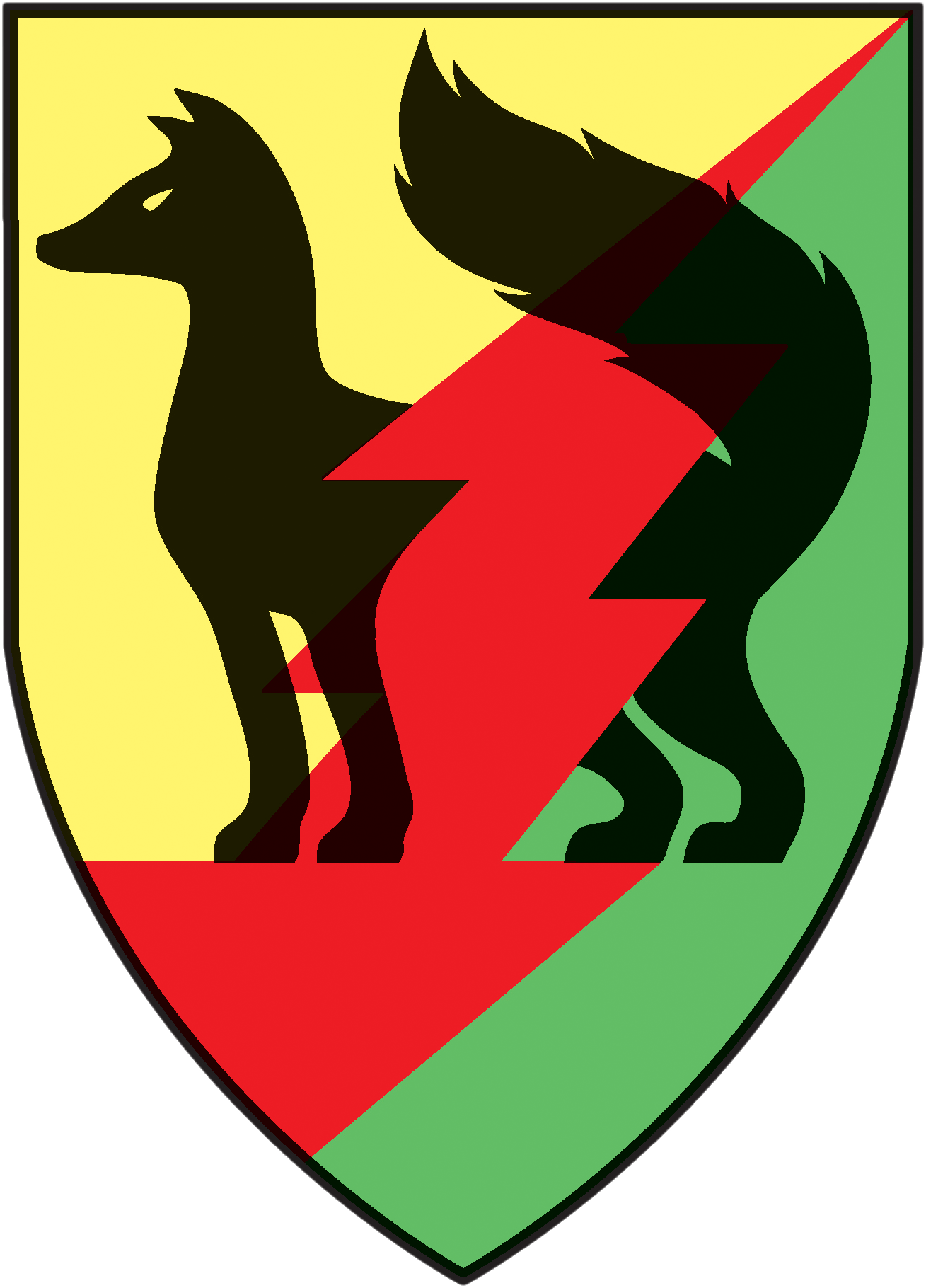
- 143rd Division "Firefox" patch
- Country: Israel
- Branch: Israeli Ground Forces
- Type: Combined arms
- Size: Division
- Part of: Southern Command

Commanders
- Current commander: Tat Aluf Barak Hiram

The 143rd Division "Firefox", also known as Gaza Division, is a division subordinated to Israeli Southern Command. Its area of operation is the border with the Gaza Strip and surrounding area. The division's commander is Brigadier-General Barak Hiram, who replaced Avi Rosenfeld in July 2024.

== History ==
The Gaza Division had been entrusted with the safety and security of Jewish settlers in the Gaza Strip after the Six-Day War in times of peace and armed conflict. In August 2005, the division, along with the rest of the IDF, officially ended its presence in the Gaza Strip as part of Israeli unilateral disengagement when Jewish settlements were dismantled. However, the Gaza Division has repeatedly entered the Gaza Strip in response to rocket attacks from Palestinian militant groups based in Gaza.

In September 2015, the division was renamed 143rd "Firefox" Division.

In October 2023, the division was part of the Battle of Re'im where Hamas temporarily took control of the Re'im Army Base and had taken several Israeli soldiers captive, resulting in the death of Lt. Col. Sahar Makhlouf.

== Division organization ==
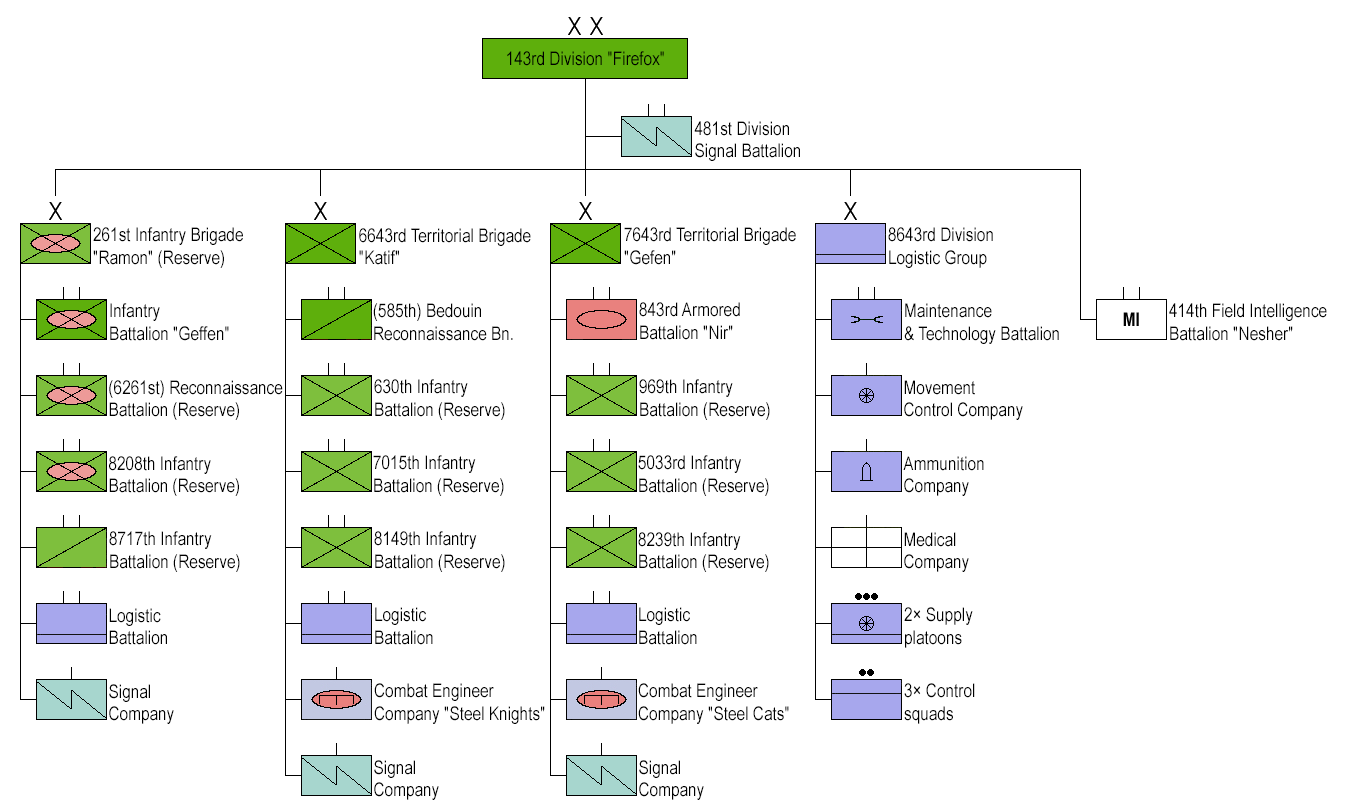
143rd Division "Firefox" organization as of November 2026

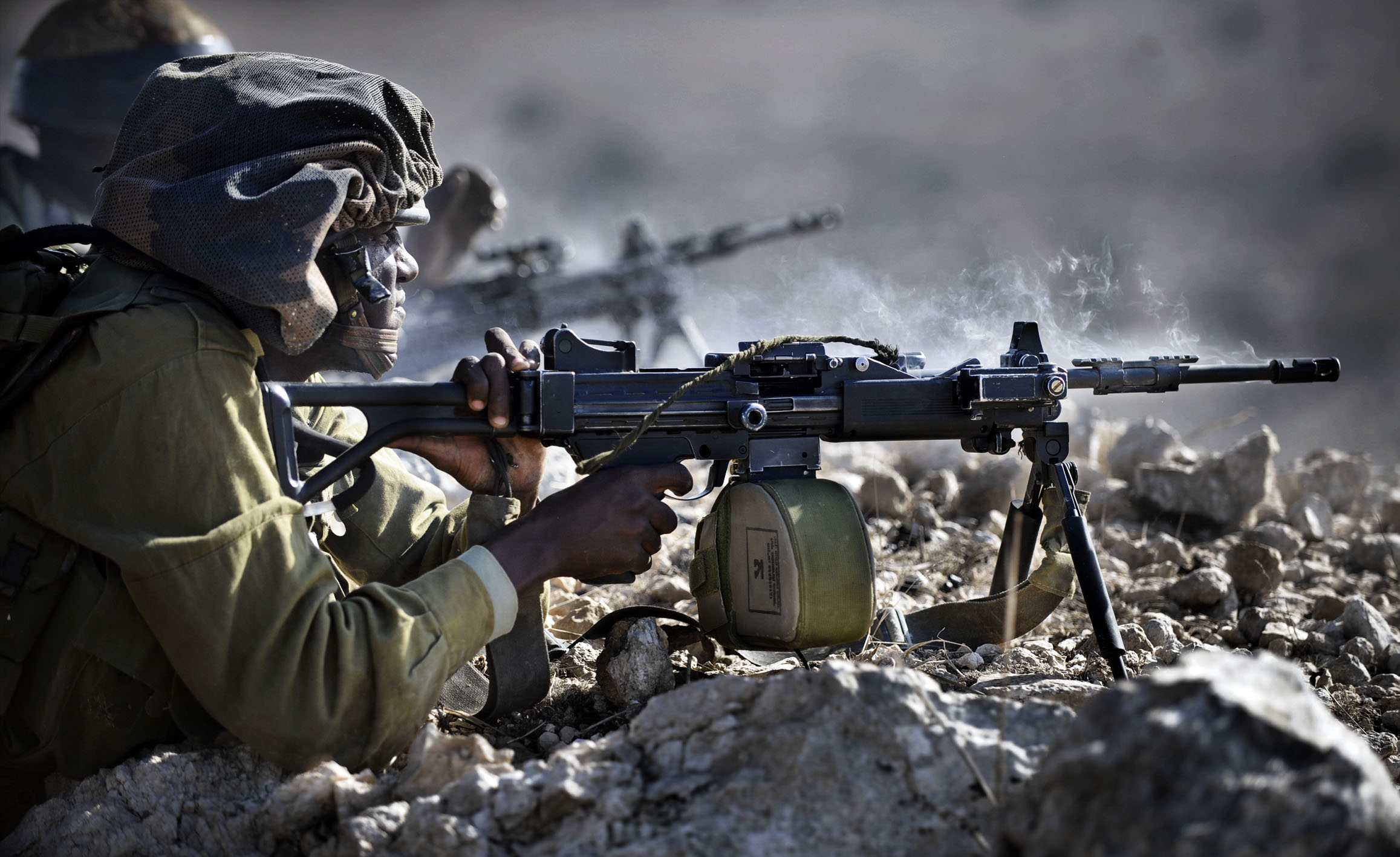
Soldiers of the Gaza Division's Desert Reconnaissance Battalion during a military exercise

- 143rd Division "Firefox"
  - 6643rd Territorial Brigade "Katif" (Southern Gaza)
    - (585th) Bedouin Reconnaissance Battalion
    - 630th Infantry Battalion (Reserve)
    - 7015th Infantry Battalion (Reserve)
    - 8149th Infantry Battalion (Reserve)
    - Combat Engineer Company "Steel Knights"
    - Signal Company
    - Logistic Battalion
  - 7643rd Territorial Brigade "Gefen" (Northern Gaza)
    - 969th Infantry Battalion (Reserve)
    - 5033rd Infantry Battalion (Reserve)
    - 8239th Infantry Battalion (Reserve)
    - Combat Engineer Company "Steel Cats"
    - 6633rd Signal Company
    - Logistic Battalion
  - 8643rd Division Logistic Group
  - 481st Division Signal Battalion
  - 414th Field Intelligence Battalion "Nesher" (Eagle)
  - Counter-Terrorism Unit "Otef" (Reserve)

== See also ==
- Judea and Samaria Division
- Operation Summer Rains (2006)
