= 340th Division (Israel) =

340th "Idan" Armoured Division
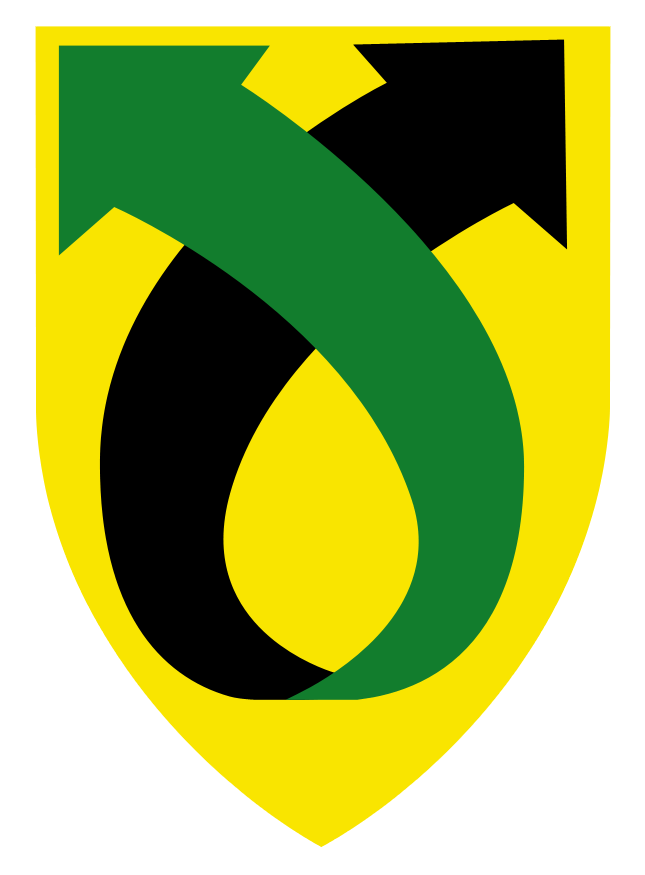
- The 340th "Idan" Armoured Division patch
- Active: 1974
- Disbanded: 15 September 2020
- Country: Israel
- Branch: Israeli Ground Forces
- Type: Combined Arms
- Size: Division
- Part of: Central Command
- Garrison/HQ: Camp Nachshonim
- Engagements: 1982 Lebanon War; Operation Defensive Shield

Commanders
- Notable commanders: Moshe Levi; Nehemiah Tamari; Shaul Mofaz

The 340th "Idan" Armoured Division (Hebrew: עוצבת עידן) was an Israel Defense Forces reserve division. It falls under the jurisdiction of the Central Regional Command and is located in Camp Nachshonim. On September 15, 2020, the division was closed. Its last commander was Avi Rosenfeld.

== History ==
Formerly the 880th Division, it was founded in 1974 as a reserve division following the Yom Kippur War. In 1982, during the First Lebanon War, the division, which included three armored brigades, remained in command reserve, and entered the eastern front during the Battle of Sultan Yacoub. In 2002, during Operation Defensive Shield, it was responsible for the military occupation of Jenin. In 2005, the unit was responsible for evacuating the northern Gaza Strip during the disengagement plan. Between 2005 and 2010, its commander was also the IDF's Chief Armor Officer (head of the Armored Corps), but in April 2010, these roles were separated. Also, in 2010, the division was awarded first place in the Ramatkal prize for distinguished reserve units.

In 2014, the division underwent reorganization aimed at turning it from an armored division into a light, multi-front division that specializes in counter-terrorism and urban warfare.

== Units ==
- 340th "Idan" Division
  - 5th "Sharon" (Reserve) Infantry Brigade
  - 16th "Jerusalem" (Reserve) Infantry Brigade
  - 847th "Chariots of Steel" (Reserve) Armor Brigade
  - 900th "Kfir"/"Young Lions" Infantry Brigade
  - 807th Division Signal Battalion
