= Kfir Brigade =

Israeli military infantry brigade

900th "Kfir" Brigade
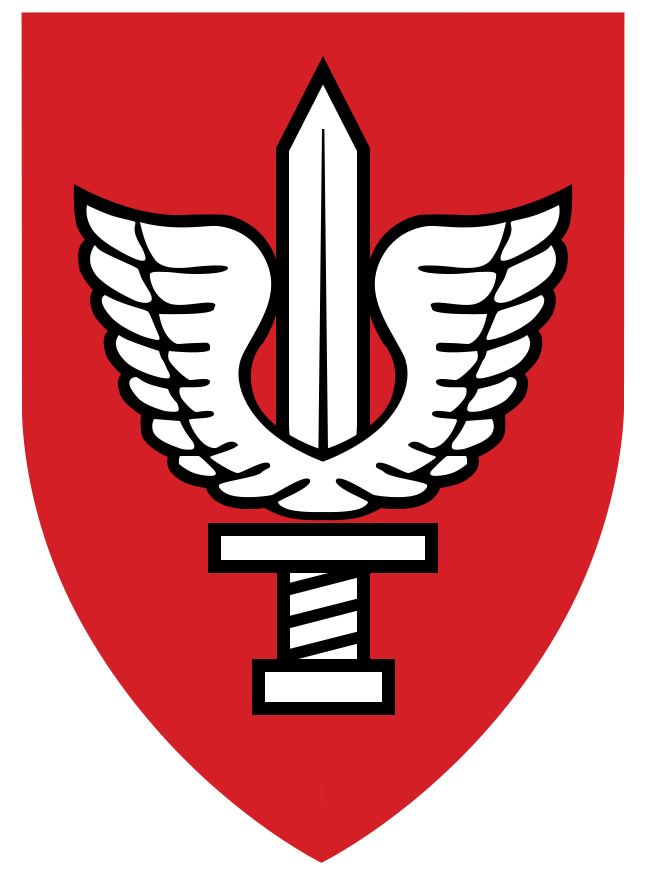
- Active: 2005–present
- Country: Israel
- Allegiance: Israel Defense Forces
- Branch: Israeli Ground Forces
- Type: Infantry
- Role: Counter-terrorism urban warfare
- Size: Headquarters, 4 infantry battalions and a training battalion, one special forces battalion, one communications detachment
- Part of: 99th Infantry Division he
- Garrison/HQ: Kfir Training Base – Bach Kfir
- Nickname(s): "Young Lions"
- Colors: Spotted beret, camouflage and white striped flag
- Engagements: Operation Hot Winter Operation Cast Lead; Operation Protective Edge Operation Iron Swords
- Website: http://www.kfir-idf.org/

Commanders
- Current commander: Colonel Sharon Altit

The 900th "Kfir" Brigade (Hebrew: חֲטִיבַת כְּפִיר, lit. "Lion Cub Brigade"), is the youngest and largest infantry brigade of the Israel Defense Forces. It is subordinate to the 99th "Flash" Infantry Division (Reserve) of Israel's Central Regional Command.

The brigade is currently deployed in the West Bank where its primary missions include counter-terror operations, apprehension of Palestinian militants, raids, patrols, manning checkpoints and regular security activities. Before Israel's 2005 disengagement from Gaza, Kfir units were also stationed in the Gaza Strip.

== History ==
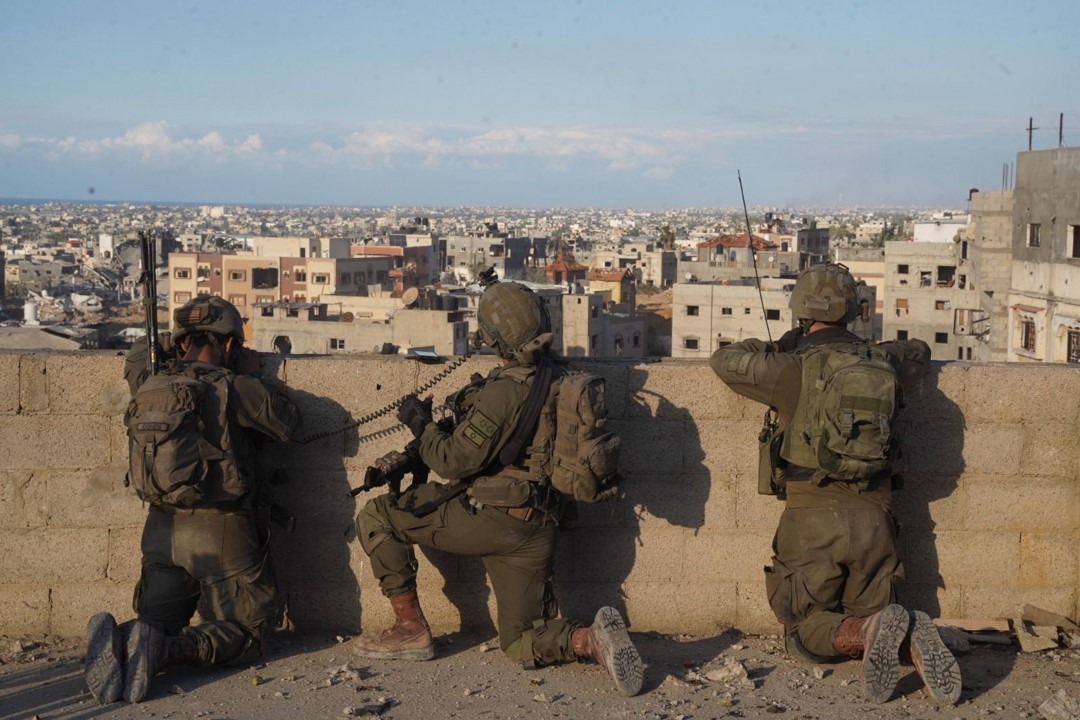
Kfir Brigade in Gaza in February 2024

In the 1990s the IDF formed the Designated Infantry Battalions, also known as the "90s Battalions", as auxiliary troops accompanying its armored forces. In December 2005, these were unified into a single regular-service brigade commanded by Colonel Eyal Nosovski.

In 2018, the Kfir Brigade participated in field exercises to simulate fighting in the Gaza Strip against Hamas fighters. In 2019, Kfir Brigade were reported to be deployed in the Gaza Strip.

In 2020, the IDF announced plans to make the brigade into a superior infantry unit by receiving additional weaponry, personnel, vehicles and training.

Colonel Sharon Altit was named as the brigade's commanding officer in May 2021, replacing Colonel Eran Uliel.

=== Controversy ===
Kfir soldiers have been reported to have refused to remove Israelis living in the West Bank.

== Brigade organization ==
- 900th Infantry Brigade "Kfir"
  - 90th Infantry Battalion "Nahshon"
  - 92nd Infantry Battalion "Shimshon"
  - (93rd) Patrol Battalion "Haruv"
  - 94th Infantry Battalion "Duchifat"
  - 97th Infantry Battalion "Netzah Yehuda"
  - Logistics Battalion
  - Signals Company

Disbanded units:

- 96th Infantry Battalion "Lavi", disbanded in July 2015.

== Personnel ==
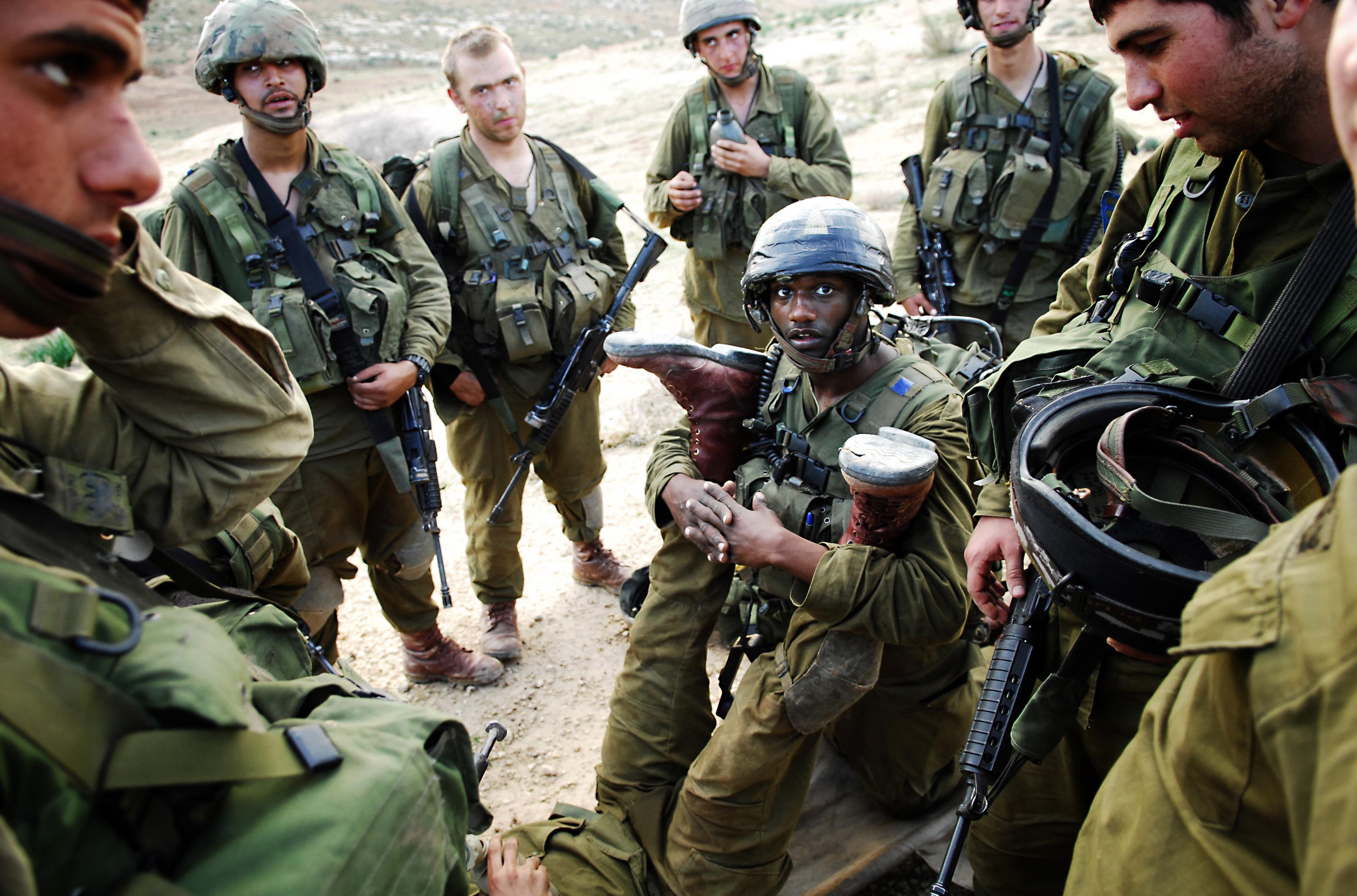
Kfir soldiers in training

Kfir recruits must complete eight months of combat training in order to be received into active service. The first four months of training are dedicated to basic training in which the soldiers learn discipline and are introduced to physical fitness and various weapons. After basic training, they receive 3–4 months of advanced training in urban warfare, advanced weaponry, fighting from armored personnel carriers, chemical warfare and other challenges of today's battlefield.

In order to attract recruits to the brigade, the Israel Defense Forces decided that to join the elite Sayeret Oketz (Special K-9 unit) or Sayeret LOTAR (Special counter terrorism unit) recruits must choose Kfir as their first priority in the draft request form and during recruit training go through a selection process. Those who do not pass the selection process continue to serve in the Kfir Brigade.

They are allowed to wear their camo beret and red-brown combat boots.

== Weapons and gear ==
The Kfir Brigade uses the M4 Carbine.

== Memorial ==
The brigade's memorial is situated in Afula. The left wing is inscribed with a Bible verse from 2 Samuel 1:23 and the right wing with a verse from Amos 3:4.

== Gallery ==
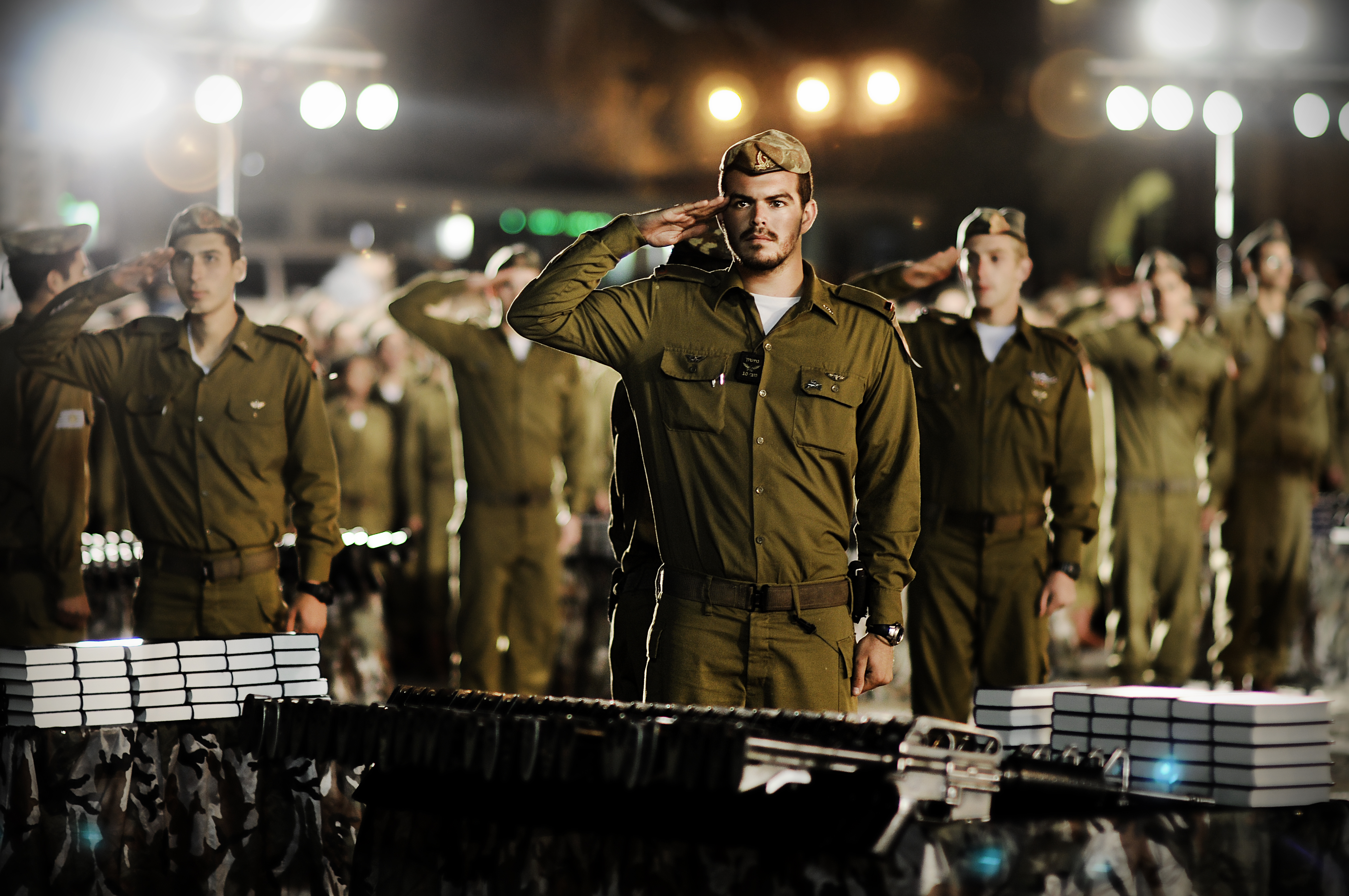
IDF officers from the Kfir infantry brigade saluting the Israeli flag in a military ceremony, 2011

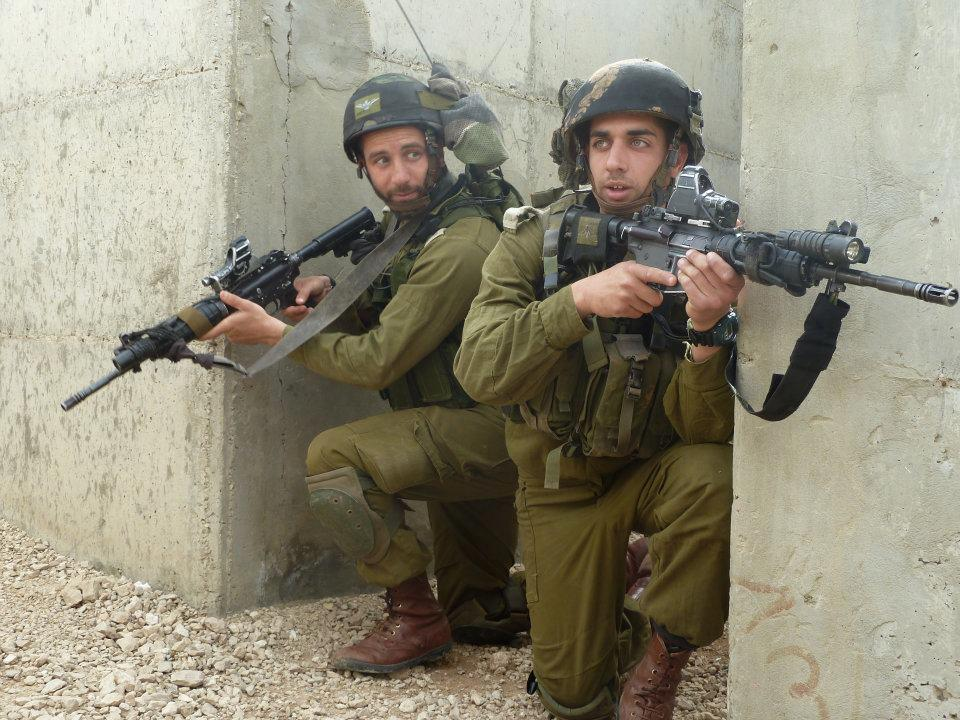
IDF Kfir Brigade officers practicing urban warfare

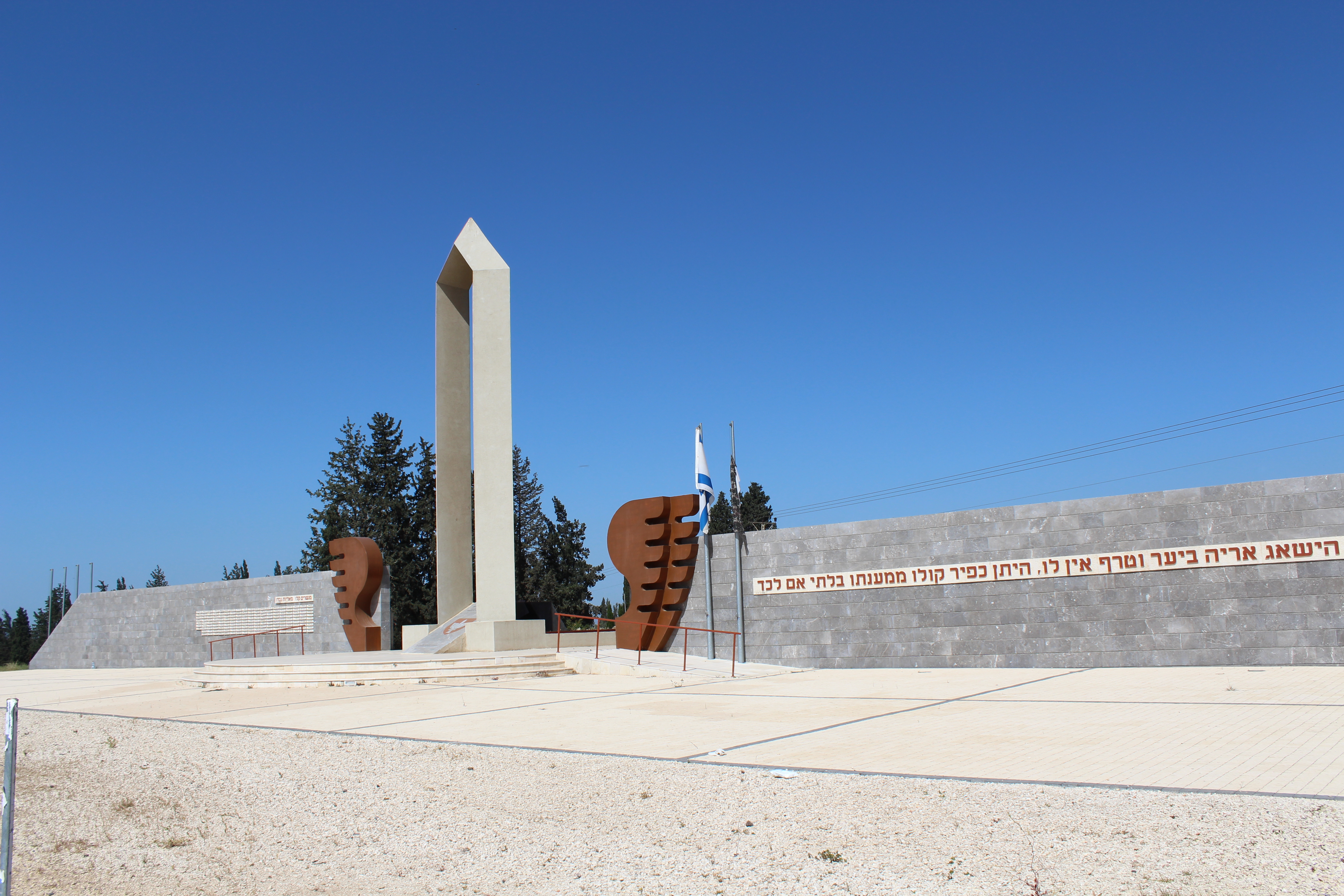
Memorial in Afula
