= Avi Rosenfeld =

Israeli Brigadier General

- אבי רוזנפלד
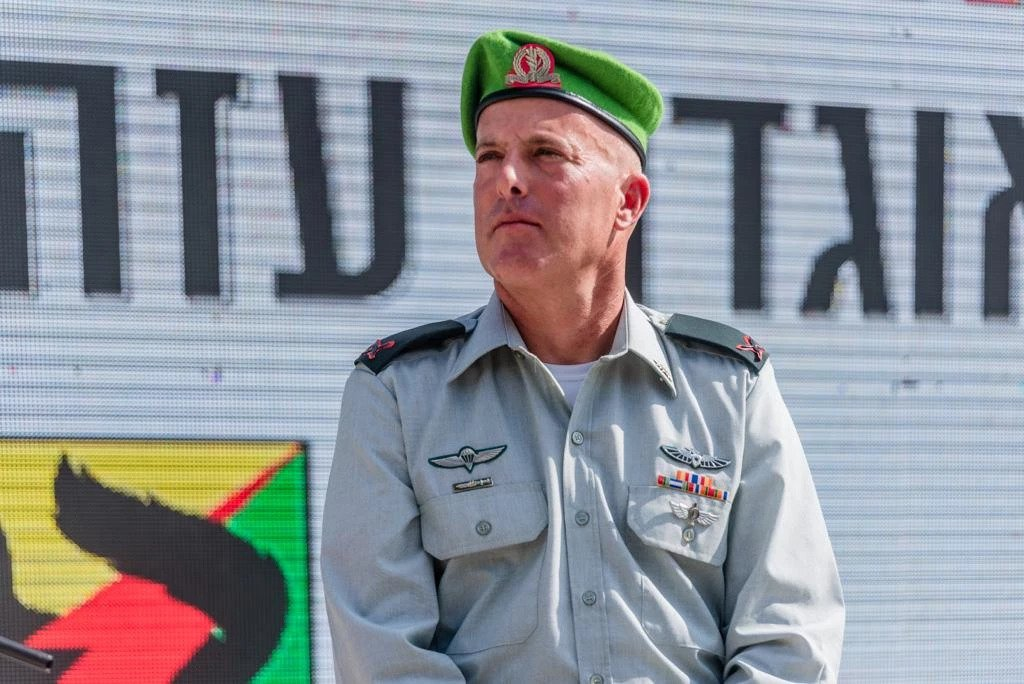
- Born: December 26, 1974 (age 51); Israel
- Military career
- Allegiance: Israel
- Branch: Israel Defense Forces
- Service years: 1993–present
- Rank: Brigadier general
- Conflicts: South Lebanon conflict (1985–2000); First Intifada; Second Intifada; 2006 Lebanon War; Operation Cast Lead; Operation Pillar of Defense; Operation Protective Edge; Operation Guardian of the Walls; Gaza war

Avi Rosenfeld (Hebrew: אבי רוזנפלד; born December 26, 1974) is an Israeli military officer. In 2023, he held the rank of Brigadier general. He served as the commander of the Gaza Division from 2022 until his resignation in June 2024; his tenure as commander included the October 7th attacks. He previously served as commander of Oz Brigade, commander of the Bislamach Brigade, commander of the Northern Gaza Brigade, commander of Sharon Regional Brigade, commander of the Shaldag Unit and commander of the Nahal Infantry Brigade.

== Early life ==
Rosenfeld was born and raised in Kibbutz Ein HaShofet. He studied at the kibbutz and at Harei Ephraim regional high school.

== Career ==
He enlisted in the Israel Defense Force (IDF) in November 1993. He was assigned to the Nahal Brigade and was accepted to the Nahal Reconnaissance Platoon.

He underwent combat soldier training, an infantry NCO course and an infantry officer course. Afterwards, he returned to the Nahal Reconnaissance Platoon and was appointed a team leader in 1995. He served as a platoon leader. He took part in fighting in southern Lebanon. In 1998, after 4 years of service, he was discharged. In 1999, he returned to permanent service and was appointed a platoon commander in the Nahal Brigade, leading it in southern Lebanon, during the withdrawal from Lebanon, and at the beginning of the Second Intifada.

He then served in the Shaldag Unit and was appointed commander of the training platoon. He was then appointed commander of a platoon of fighters, leading it in operational activity in combat and during the Second Lebanon War. He served as deputy commander of the unit. He then studied at the IDF Command and Staff College.

In 2010, he was promoted to Lieutenant Colonel and appointed Infantry Branch Head at the IDF Ground Forces training center, serving until 2011. He returned to the Nahal Brigade and served as the commander of the Nahal Infantry Battalion in 2011–2012. He served as commander of the Shaldag Unit between 2012–2015, leading it during Operation Pillar of Defense, Operation Protective Edge and routine security missions. In August 2015, he was promoted to Colonel and appointed commander of the Sharon Regional Brigade, serving until June 22, 2017.

On July 20, 2017, he was appointed commander of the Northern Gaza Brigade, serving until May 23, 2019. On August 15, 2019, he was appointed commander of the Bislamach Brigade, a position he held until August 25, 2020. On August 20, 2020, he was promoted to Major General and on September 10 he assumed office as commander of the 340th "Idan" Armoured Division. On September 15, 2020, the division was closed, and the Oz Brigade was established under his command instead. He served in this position until August 11, 2022.

=== Commander of the Gaza Division ===
In the surprise attack on Israel on October 7, 2023, Palestinian militants from Gaza infiltrated many communities surrounding Gaza, killing over 800 civilians, over 300 soldiers and other security personnel, and abducted over 200 Israelis to Gaza. The militants infiltrated the Gaza Division headquarters and controlled it for several hours until the IDF retook control. Rosenfeld continued managing the fighting in the sector. Rosenfeld announced he was quitting in June after saying he “failed” to protect the Israeli border communities from the attack.

Rosenfeld resigned as commanding officer of the Gaza Division on June 9, 2024 due to his role in Israel's failures on October 7.

On November 23, 2025, IDF chief of staff Eyal Zamir dismissed Rosenfeld from reservist duty.

Rosenfeld's service on October 7 was criticized in the media and by his superiors. In September 2025, the Jerusalem Post stated that he had made "terrible decisions" which made the Israeli military's defeat that day "multiple times worse" than it otherwise would have been. The newspaper specifically criticized Rosenfeld's alleged refusal to acknowledge the magnitude of the Gaza Division's defeat on the morning of October 7.
