= LOTAR =

Special forces unit of the Israel Defense Forces

The Counter-Terror School
- בית הספר ללוט״ר
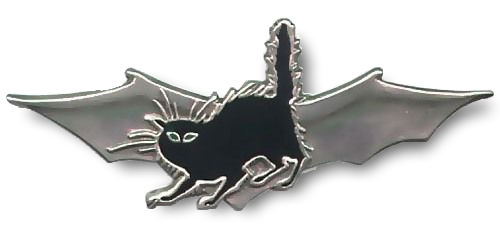
- Unit's insignia
- Active: 1974 (52 years ago)
- Country: Israel
- Allegiance: Israel Defense Forces
- Type: Counterterrorism school Special operations unit
- Role: Air assault Anti-tank warfare Artillery observer Bomb disposal CBRN defense Clandestine operation Close-quarters battle Counterterrorism; Covert operation Desert warfare Direct action Executive protection Hostage rescue HUMINT; Irregular warfare Long-range penetration Military education and training Mountain warfare Patrolling; Raiding; Reconnaissance; Special operations Special reconnaissance Tracking; Urban warfare
- Garrison/HQ: Mitkan Adam
- Nickname: Unit 707
- Mottos: מְלַמֵּד יָדַי לַמִּלְחָמָה וְנִחַת קֶשֶׁת־נְחוּשָׁה זְרֹעֹתָי (2 Samuel 22) "Who trained my hands for battle, So that my arms can bend a bow of bronze!"
- Engagements: Second Lebanon War; Operation Cast Lead; Operation Protective Edge

Commanders
- Notable commanders: Amos Kotzer - Founding Commander

Location of The LOTAR School in Mitkan Adam (lit. Adam Base)

The LOTAR Unit (Hebrew: יחידת הלוט"ר) stands for: Lochama Be'Terror (לוחמה בטרור), meaning "Combating Terrorism." It is also known as Unit 707 or The Counter-Terror School.

It is tasked primarily with training other IDF units in the areas of anti-irregular military in insurgency areas, counterterrorism and hostage rescue crisis management, tactical intelligence gathering, the use of sniper rifles, and various small-scale and short-range warfare scenarios. It also, to a lesser degree, performs these tasks itself. Furthermore the unit has taken on several other responsibilities including the theories of camouflage, the training of special soldiers called "monkeys" (trained in climbing and rappelling), and several other training scenarios. Meanwhile if really necessary unit's personnel must carry out military special operations according to assigned missions. Most of them focus on commando style raids, counterterrorism, covert operation, hostage rescue (if necessary), irregular warfare, tactical intelligence gathering, and tracking high-value targets.

The LOTAR School is housed inside of Mitkan Adam (Hebrew: מתקן אדם, lit. 'Adam Base'), alongside the Oketz Unit and the Oz Brigade, southeast of Tel Aviv within the Hevel Modi'in Regional Council.

== History ==
The unit was founded by its first Commander, Amos Kotzer, in 1974. It was created, along with Yamam, a unit in the Israel Border Police, primarily in response to the Ma'alot massacre, where a failed rescue operation by Sayeret Matkal resulted in the deaths of 25 hostages, including 21 children, before the hostage takers were killed.
