= Kugel (disambiguation) =

Kugel is a traditional Jewish baked dish.

Kugel may also refer to:

- Kugel fountain, a sculpture consisting of a large granite sphere floating on a thin film of water
- Kugel, a slang term among South African Jews for an overly materialistic and excessively groomed young woman
- Kugel (TV series), 2024 Israeli TV drama series
- 120375 Kugel, an asteroid
- Kugel (surname)

== See also ==
- Kugelblitz
