= Kugel (surname) =

Kugel is a German and Yiddish surname. Notable people with the surname include:

- Alexander Kugel (1864–1928), Russian and Soviet theatre critic and editor
- Bettina Kugel Hirsch, American film editor and an adjunct professor of editing
- Chaim Kugel (1897–1953), Zionist leader and the first mayor of Holon
- Chen Kugel (born 1962), Israeli pathologist who did an autopsy on Yahya Sinwar
- Dana Kugel, Israeli female badminton player
- François Kugel, French amateur astronomer credited with the discovery over 400 asteroids
- James Kugel (born 1945), biblical scholar and professor
- Michael Kugel (born 1946), Russian viola player and composer
- Riley Kugel, American basketball player
- Sarah Feigin (née Kugel; 1928 – 2011), Latvian music educator and composer
- Theresa Kugel (1912–1977), convert from Orthodox Judaism to the Russian Catholic Church and a Gulag survivor

== See also ==
- Alla Kigel a Russian theatre director
