= Shura Base =

Israeli military base

Shura Camp
- Active: 1930
- Country: Israel
- Allegiance: Israeli Defense Force
- Type: military base
- Role: Military Rabbinate | Center of identification of the fallen
- Colors: khaki

Commanders
- Current commander: Brigadier Comander Eyal Krim

Shura Base also known as Shura Camp (Hebrew: מחנה שורה) is an IDF base near Ramla. It was built during the British Mandate and operated as an ordnance base. Since 2016 the camp has held the Military Rabbinate unit. Inside the base is the Zvi Center (Merkaz HaTzvi), built specifically to receive, identify, and prepare fallen soldiers before burial. Under normal circumstances, Shura camp handled only soldiers, while civilian casualties were sent to Abu Kabir the Institute of Forensic Medicine in Tel Aviv. On 8 October 2023, following the Hamas-led attacks on Israel, the base transformed into a main national emergency center for identifying both soldiers and civilians because the number of victims exceeded the normal forensic facility's capacity.

== Camp units and renovation ==
Since 2016, several IDF units from other military bases have relocated to Shura camp, which was renovated as part of a relocation project.

Military Rabbinate Headquarters

The Rabbinate headquarters, which moved to Shura from Camp Tzrifin, completed its relocation in August 2021, establishing Shura as the Rabbinate's central command, including the Halakha and Technology section, the military conversion court and a scribal STAM inspection laboratory. It also includes the central logistics warehouses that supply religious items to soldiers across the IDF.

The Zvi Center (Merkaz HaTzvi)

The Zvi Center serves as the national facility for processing fallen soldiers, designed specifically to operate during large scale national emergencies and wartime. The compound is equipped with the required infrastructure such as walk-in freezers, examination rooms and the staff needed to handle mass casualties.

== Identification of October 7 victims ==
Under normal circumstances, Shura handles only the fallen soldiers, while civilian casualties are sent to Abu Kabir institute. After the October 7 attacks, forensic staff realized the number of victims was far too large for Abu Kabir to process. The IDF and the Israeli Police decided to move the majority of the victims including the civilians to Shura, which already had an equipped facility to contain approximately 300 bodies. Shura itself was quickly overwhelmed by the growing number and condition of the remains. Military rabbis, soldiers, police, and civilian volunteers worked around the clock in tents temporarily placed between the refrigerated shipping containers. Identification of the bodies was done using methods of dental records, DNA sampling, fingerprints, and visual recognition when it was possible. Since many of the bodies that arrived at Shura were beyond recognition, burned, dismembered or in pieces, including some body bags that contained the remains of more than one victim, to manage the identification load, DNA samples that were taken at Shura were sent out to Abu Kabir and the most complex cases such as badly charred or decomposed remains, were also moved back from Shura to Abu Kabir labs, where local and foreign forensic specialists worked together to identify them.

== See also ==
- ZAKA
- Disaster victim identification
- Forensic Identification of the October 7 victims
