= Forensics of the October 7 attacks =

Identifying human remains after Hamas led attacks

The identification and forensics of the October 7 attacks victims of the Hamas-led attacks, took place in Israel after security forces of the IDF and police coordinated efforts. Approximately 3000 body bags and remains were admitted and transferred for identification, to both Shura camp and to the Israel National Center of Forensic Medicine in Abu Kabir. The civilian facility does not have the capacity to deal with mass casualties incidents such as this extensive terror attack, and as increasing number of bodies kept coming, it was decided to form an additional station in the Shura camp. The Shura base, that under normal circumstances can accept the bodies of fallen soldiers, started receiving the bodies that arrived from the attack sites: the Gaza enveloped towns and kibbutzim, as well as military bases. The majority of the identification took place in Shura military base, while the most difficult cases were transferred to Abu Kabir for further lab tests and advanced DNA analysis.

Disaster Victim Identification after 2023 Hamas attack on Israel

Security forces, ZAKA , and volunteers collected the dead bodies and body parts from across the sites. Archaeologists from the Israel Antiquities Authority also took part. They searched at sites that were completely burned, and sifted through the ashes for the remains of body parts, which helped determine the deaths of unidentified bodies. Forensics was based on visual identification, dental records, fingerprinting, and scans. The staff that took part in the identification process of the victims, are reported to suffer post-traumatic distress due to identifying mass victims with extremely damaged bodies from Hamas attacks. As of 2025, Shura military base is still holding remnants of bodies that have not yet been identified.

== Facilities ==
Under normal circumstances identification of the dead in Israel is divided between two establishments.

Abu-Kabir, the National Center of Forensic Medicine located in Tel Aviv, is the public center for examining the death of civilians from unnatural causes. Prior to the October 7th attacks the facility had room for 140 bodies, and in all the previous Mass casualties incidents all the victims were brought to this location.

Tzvi center, which operates in Shura base alongside the Military Rabbinate headquarters, is defined as the national Center for identifying fallen Soldiers of Israel Wars and military operations. The center includes refrigerated containers, a DNA identification lab, CT scanners and dental x-ray. It was also designed to operate under extreme scenarios such as War or mass casualty operational accidents.

== Identification methods ==
Forensic staff used multiple methods such as visual identification, fingerprinting and advanced medical imaging scans to identify victims of the October 7, 2023 attacks, particularly when remains were severely burned, mutilated, or fragmented. Scanning methods included standard Computed Tomography (CT scans) Portable Cone-Beam Computed Tomography (CBCT), as well as Standard dental x-rays and orthopantomograms (OPGs).

== Initial response ==
According to institution manager Chen Kugel, on the morning of October 7th the police informed him of dozens of victims. At that point the media reported that 20 to 30 had died, while the institute already knew of hundreds. The staff of the facility came to the conclusion that it would be impossible to identify the increasing number of bodies in Abu Kabir, which led the IDF and the Israel police to decide to set up a special unit to perform the identification in Shura military base for both civilians and Soldier casualties.

== Collecting the remains ==
Under a barrage of missiles and ongoing Hamas attacks, ZAKA volunteers and security forces were sent to retrieve the bodies of the victims, initially from the Nova music festival massacre site near Re'im, including the roads and highways surrounding the Gaza enveloped area. Some of the towns and kibutzim like Be'eri were impossible to access since they were still battle zones with ongoing IDF efforts to fend off Hamas attacks.Many participated in collecting the dead bodies including ZAKA, security forces and other specialists like archaeologists from the Israeli Antiquity Authority who implemented methods of archeologic excavations to allocate small bone fragments by sifting through the ashes and the ruins of houses that were burned to the ground. In the initial days after the attacks, fingerprints were taken only once the bodies arrived at Shura base. Later on, fingerprints were taken at the actual attack sites to speed the procedure up.

== Forensic challenges ==
The Abu Kabir staff had to face extreme cases of charred remnants of victims that were burned at very high temperatures where the DNA was completely destroyed and the bones turned white and deformed. In many cases, only small parts of bones or single bones instead of whole skeleton arrived. Along with human remnants, were mistakenly collected animal bones. The work of collecting the remains was massive. In the very first weeks trucks with body bags arrived to the site daily and unlike in large disaster events such as a plane crash where there would be a list of numbers and identity of missing passengers, in the Hamas attacks there were no lists of missing people. This made the identification procedure much harder. In cases where no identifiable DNA was left, investigators had to build an anthropological profile based on age, sex, and height using CT scans and comparisons to old x-ray footage. Rabbinic halacha law demanding swift Jewish burial made the entire procedure very complicated. Often, only a small fraction of the body was buried. Mistakes in collecting the bodies and remnants by non professional teams immediately after the attacks damaged evidence from the sites and the staff worked under constant pressure due to burn severity and the large number of human victims. Due to the confusion, some bodies were accidentally buried together, and when the mistake was identified the bodies had to be extracted to receive a proper Jewish burial. A special unit was assigned after October 7 to examine 44 cases of victims whose bodies were kidnapped into Gaza and nothing was known as to what had happened to them. Forensic findings were able to establish who they were and that they were dead. In 2025, the identification process was officially declared done. All the victims were identified, yet 350 body bags with unidentified body parts remained at the Shura Base.

== Emotional implications ==
Reserve staff and doctors who served at Shura base and Abu-Kabir were diagnosed with long term post traumatic stress disorder which in some cases led to them committing suicide.

== See also ==
- Disaster victim identification
- Forensic archaeology
- Unidentified decedent
