= Chaim Kugel =

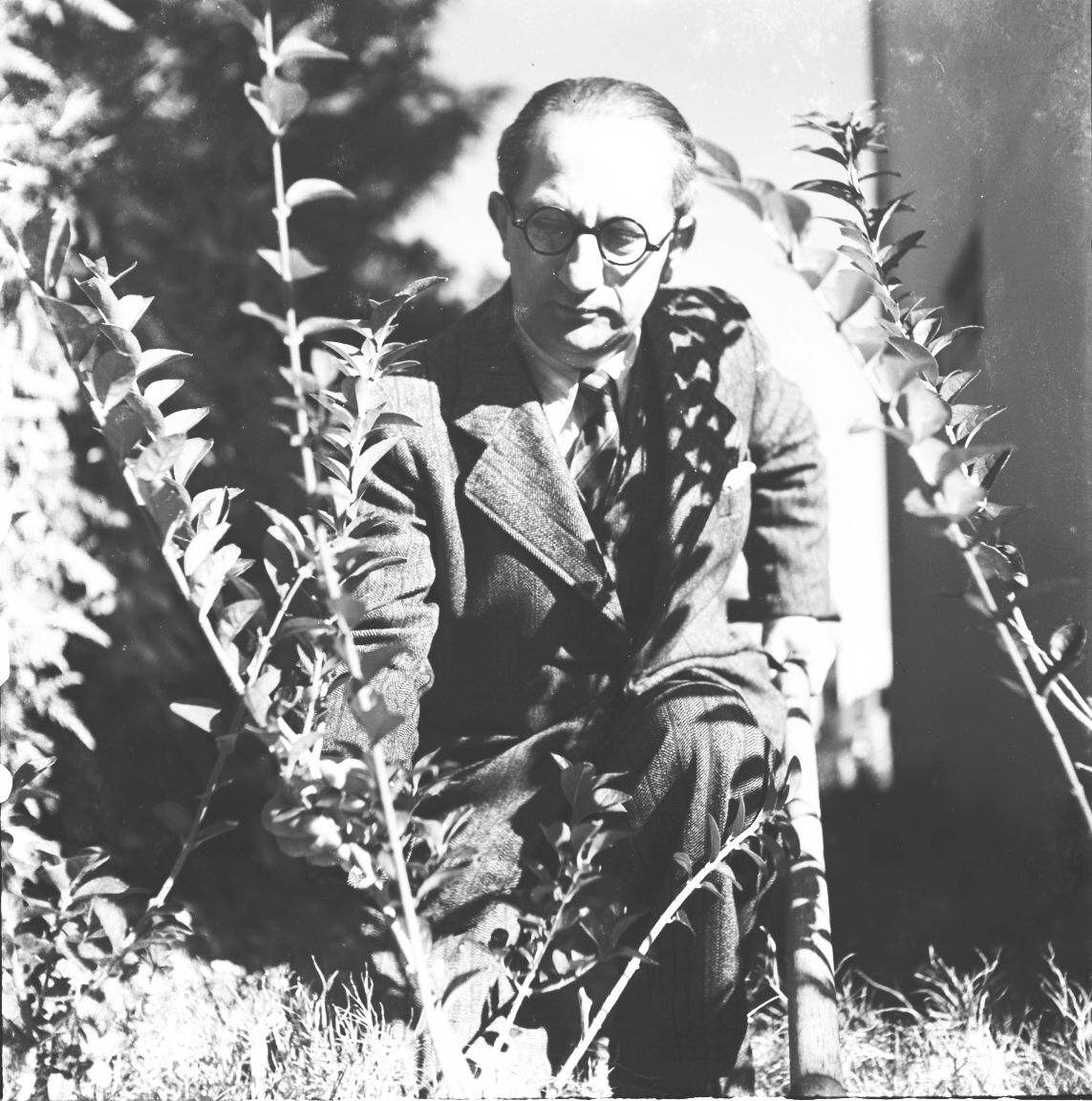
Chaim Kugel, 1945

Chaim Kugel (Hebrew: חיים קוגל; April 25, 1897 – February 4, 1953) was a Jewish politician and civil servant. He was member of the Czechoslovak parliament on behalf of the Jewish Party, the first chairman of the Holon local council and, upon its declaration as a city, its first mayor.

Chaim Kugel was born in Minsk, Russian Empire (now in Belarus) to the family of Nahum and Reizel nee Fry. He received his doctorate in economics and philosophy at the Charles University in Prague.

Kugel was a founder (1924) and the director of the Munkács Hebrew Gymnasium.

His grandson, Chen Kugel, is a forensic physician and director of the Israeli L. Greenberg National Institute of Forensic Medicine (2013–).

The Kugel Prize for literature and science books has been awarded by the Holon Municipality since 1952.
