= October 7 attacks =

2023 armed incursions and massacres in Israel

- Part of the Israeli–Palestinian conflict, the Gaza war, and the Middle Eastern crisis
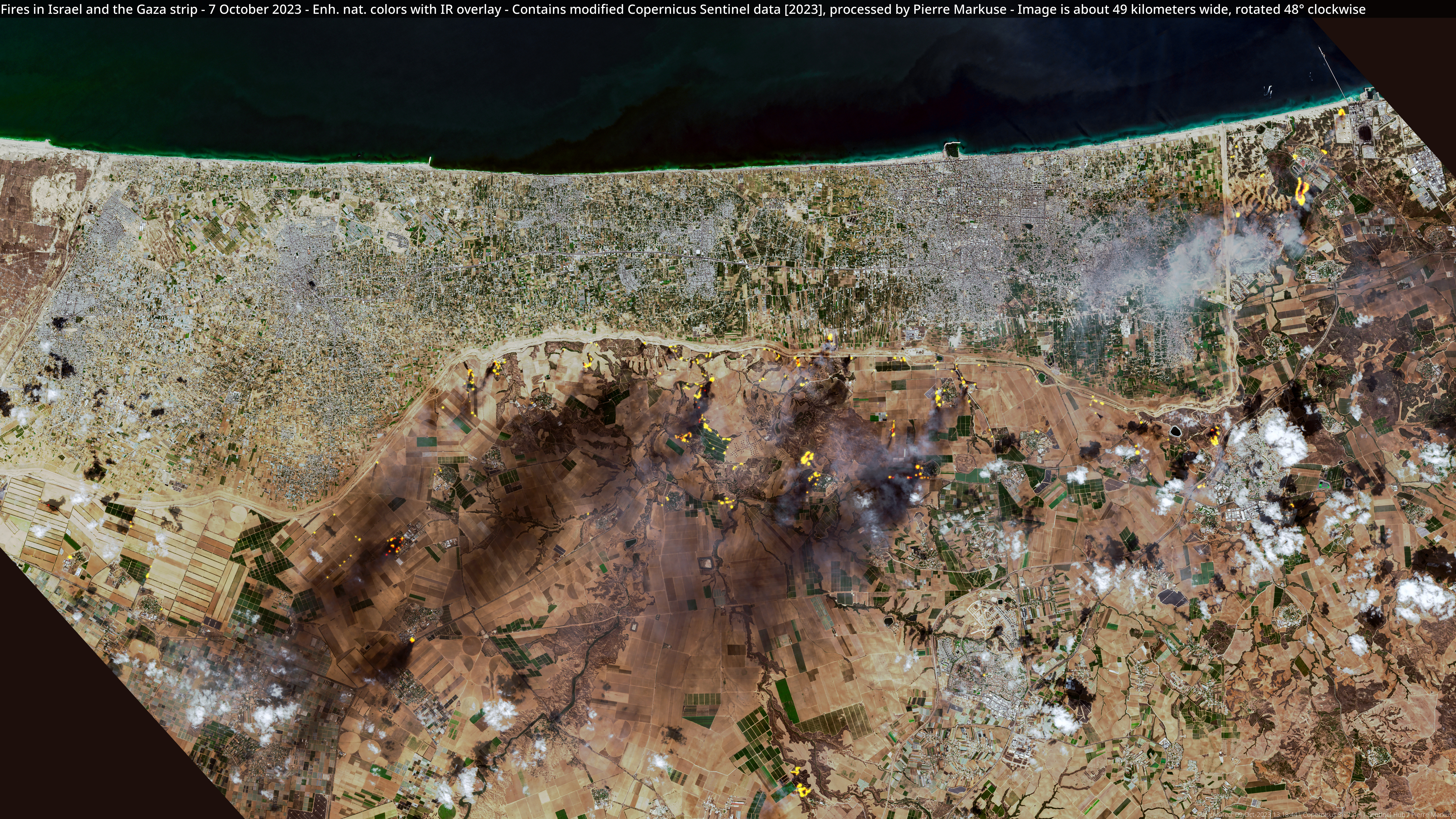
- Satellite view of the Gaza–Israel barrier and fires in the Gaza envelope on October 7, 2023
Date	October 7–8, 2023 (Note: The last gun battle inside Israel between Israeli security forces and Hamas operatives was October 12.) (1 day)
Location	Gaza envelope, Southern District, Israel

Belligerents
Hamas Palestinian allies: Palestinian Islamic Jihad; Popular Resistance Committees; Popular Front for the Liberation of Palestine; Democratic Front for the Liberation of Palestine; Al-Aqsa Martyrs' Brigades; Palestinian Mujahideen Movement; Palestinian Freedom Movement	Israel

Commanders and leaders
(Hamas) Yahya Sinwar; (Hamas) Mohammed Deif; (Hamas) Marwan Issa; (Hamas) Wissam Farhat; (Hamas) Rafa Salama	Benjamin Netanyahu; Yoav Gallant; Herzi Halevi; Yaron Finkelman; (Israel) Oded Basyuk; (Israel) Avi Rosenfeld; (Israel) Barak Hiram; (Israel) Roi Levy †; (Israel) Asaf Hamami †; (Israel) Yonatan Steinberg †; (Israel) Kobi Shabtai; (Israel) Itzik Buzukashvili †; (Israel) Jayar Davidov †; (Israel) Avi Amar †; (Israel) Ronen Bar

Units involved
(Palestine) Palestinian Joint Operations Room; (Hamas) Al-Qassam Brigades; Nukhba forces; (Palestinian Islamic Jihad) Al-Quds Brigades; Al-Nasser Salah al-Deen Brigades; (Popular Front for the Liberation of Palestine) Abu Ali Mustafa Brigades; National Resistance Brigades; Al-Aqsa Martyrs' Brigades; Mujahideen Brigades; Al-Ansar Brigades; (Palestine) Palestinian civilian mobs	Israel Defense Forces; Israeli Ground Forces; Golani Brigade; 13th Battalion; 51st Battalion; Nahal Brigade; Gaza Division; Refaim Unit; Caracal Battalion; Home Front Command; Israeli Navy; (Israel) Shayetet 13; 916th Patrol Squadron (Ashdod); (Israel) Snapir unit; Air Defense Command; Israel Police; Israel Border Police; Yamam; Yoav Unit; (Israel) Shin Bet; (Israel) Armed Israeli civilians

Strength
Per Israel: ~6,000 entered Israel (3,800 Nukhba fighters, 2,200 civilians and other fighters); 1,000 rocket launch crews inside Gaza	Israel Defense Forces: 767 soldiers; 12 tanks

Casualties and losses
Per Israel: 1,200 fighters killed 149 fighters captured	1,195 civilians and security forces killed: 828+ civilians (Note: Including 71 foreign nationals, 36 children (20 under 15 years) and 14 hostages); 367+ security forces (Note: Calculated from referenced data (828/1,195).); 3,400 civilians and security forces wounded 251 security forces and civilians captured (Note: (83 later died in captivity or were confirmed dead))

On October 7, 2023, a series of coordinated armed incursions from the blockaded Gaza Strip into the Gaza envelope of southern Israel were carried out by Hamas and several other Palestinian militant groups. In response, Israel launched a major military operation in Gaza.

The attacks began during the Jewish holiday of Simchat Torah with a barrage of at least 4,300 rockets and vehicle-transported and powered paraglider incursions launched into Israel. Hamas militants breached the Gaza–Israel barrier, attacking military bases and massacring civilians in 21 communities, including Be'eri, Kfar Aza, Nir Oz, Netiv Haasara, and Alumim. According to an Israel Defense Forces (IDF) report that revised the estimate on the number of attackers, 6,000 Gazans breached the border in 119 locations into Israel, including 3,800 from the elite Nukhba forces and 2,200 civilians and other militants. Additionally, the IDF report estimated 1,000 Gazans fired rockets from the Gaza Strip, bringing the total number of participants on Hamas's side to 7,000.

In total, at least 1,195 people were killed by the attacks: (Note: It is unclear how many of them were killed by friendly fire or as a result of the Hannibal Directive. A Ynet article stated that there was an "immense and complex quantity" of friendly-fire incidents during the October 7 attack.) (Note: This excludes the invading Palestinian militants who died in the subsequent fighting with Israeli armed personnel.) at least 828 civilians (including 36 children and 71 foreign nationals) and at least 367 members of the security forces. 364 civilians were killed while they were attending the Nova music festival and many more wounded. 251 Israeli and non-Israeli civilians and soldiers were taken as hostages to the Gaza Strip. Numerous sources have reported dozens of cases of rape and sexual assault. The IDF used the Hannibal Directive on that day, which may have led to at least 13 Israeli civilian deaths.

Hamas said its attack was in response to the Israeli occupation, the blockade of the Gaza Strip, the expansion of illegal Israeli settlements, rising Israeli settler violence, recent escalations and Israel's holding of Palestinian prisoners, and that it was in defense of the Palestinian people and their cause. Experts disagree on whether Hamas sought to induce the destruction of Israel, or to establish a Palestinian state with 1967 borders. The day was labelled the bloodiest in Israel's history and "the deadliest for Jews since the Holocaust" by many figures and media outlets in the West, including then-US president Joe Biden. Some have alleged that the attack was an act of genocide or a genocidal massacre against Israelis. The governments of 44 countries denounced the attack and described it as terrorism, while some Arab and Muslim-majority countries blamed Israel's occupation of the Palestinian territories as the root cause of the attack.

== Names ==
Hamas and other Palestinian armed groups codenamed the attacks Operation Al-Aqsa Flood, (Note: or Deluge; Arabic: عملية طوفان الأقصى, romanized: ʿamaliyyat ṭūfān al-ʾAqṣā, Arabic pronunciation: [ʔamal.ij.jat tˤuː.faːn al.ʔaq.sˤaː], usually romanized as "Tufan Al-Aqsa" or "Toofan Al-Aqsa".) while in Israel they are referred to as Black Saturday (Note: Hebrew: השבת השחורה, romanized: Ha-Shabbat Ha-Shehorah, Hebrew pronunciation: [hä.ʃe̞.ve̞t his.χu.ʁä]) or the Simchat Torah Massacre. (Note: Hebrew: הטבח בשמחת תורה, romanized: HaTevach BeSimchat Tora, Hebrew pronunciation: [hät.bäχ be̞ʃ.mä.χät tu.ʁä]) Internationally and commonly in Israel, the attacks are called the October 7 attacks.

== Background ==
The Gaza Strip under Israeli blockade, with Israeli/Egyptian-controlled borders and limited fishing zone in September 2023

=== Israeli occupation and blockade of the Gaza Strip ===
According to international humanitarian law scholars, Palestinians in the Gaza Strip has been subjected to some form of belligerent Israeli occupation since 1967.

The Gaza Strip—a coastal strip 28 miles long and 6 miles wide with small towns and refugee camps delineated by the Green Line of the 1949 Armistice Agreements—was constituted in the aftermath of the Nakba and the 1948 Palestine war, when it came under Egyptian administration (1949–67). In the 1967 Arab–Israeli War (Six-Day War), the Israeli military occupied the Gaza Strip (1967–2005), imposing restrictions on movement and goods into the territory since the early 1990s.

In 2005, Israel disengaged (Note: For Ilias Bantekas and Safaa S. Jaber, the "so-called" disengagement, "did not necessarily constitute an end to the occupation" as "the absence of Israeli troops on the territory of Gaza was a mere technicality, since the Israeli military redeployed outside of Gaza while maintaining troops on the external land border and reserving exclusive control over Gaza’s airspace and territorial waters" which was "followed by an official declaration stipulating that Gaza was in fact a ‘hostile territory’ and Israel proceeded to impose a blockade against it.") from the Gaza Strip by withdrawing its forces and dismantling and evacuating its 21 settlements there, though it redeployed and maintained troops on the borders outside of Gaza and took exclusive control of the airspace over Gaza and its territorial waters. Israel maintained restrictions and active control on the movement of people and goods in the Gaza Strip, with the stated aims of preventing the smuggling of weapons into Gaza and exerting economic pressure on Hamas. In the view of the majority of the relevant scholarship, the United Nations, the International Court of Justice, and many other international non-governmental humanitarian and legal organizations, Israel has continued to be regarded as an occupying power in the Gaza Strip, which has continued to be regarded as among the occupied Palestinian territories. The official Israeli view and certain pro-Israel scholars consider the Gaza Strip to be unoccupied.

=== Hamas ===
The Islamic Resistance Movement (Hamas), is a Palestinian nationalist Islamist movement that formed in 1987. It is the largest Islamist movement in the Palestinian territories. They maintain an uncompromising stance on the "complete liberation of Palestine", often using political violence to achieve their goals. Hamas has issued contradictory statements concerning the acceptability of the 1967 borders. Hamas has been responsible for numerous suicide bombings and rocket attacks targeting Israeli civilians. Australia, Canada, the EU, Japan, New Zealand, and the UK have designated Hamas a "terrorist organisation". In 2010 it attempted to derail the peace talks between Israel and the PA. In 2017, it adopted a new charter, removing antisemitic language and shifting focus from Jews to Zionists. Scholars differ on Hamas's objectives, with some saying it seeks a Palestinian state within 1967 borders while others believe Hamas still seeks the destruction of Israel. (Note: Sources that say Hamas calls for Israel's destruction cite the 1988 Hamas charter, while sources that say Hamas has accepted the 1967 borders cite the 2017 Hamas charter, 2005 Palestinian Cairo Declaration and 2006 Palestinian Prisoners' Document.)

=== International warnings ===
Before the attack, Saudi Arabia warned Israel of an "explosion" as a result of the continued occupation. Egypt said it warned Israel days before the attack that "an explosion of the situation [was] coming, and very soon, and it would be big." Israel denied receiving such a warning, although Michael McCaul, Chairman of the US House Foreign Relations Committee, said that warnings were given three days before the attack. According to Haaretz, Israeli prime minister Benjamin Netanyahu was warned of a Hamas plot to attack Israel in a September 2023 phone call with UAE president Mohamed bin Zayed Al Nahyan. The UAE had been told of the attack by an intermediary, who warned that Hamas leader Yahya Sinwar was plotting a "huge surprise". The UAE did not comment on the Haaretz report, although Netanyahu denied it and told his lawyers to sue the newspaper and the report's authors, Shlomi Eldar and Ruth Yuval.

=== Immediate prelude ===
Throughout 2023, increased settler attacks displaced hundreds of Palestinians. In April, clashes occurred around the Al-Aqsa Mosque, a contested holy site in Jerusalem. In May, clashes occurred between Israel and the Palestinian Islamic Jihad group.

Tensions between Israel and Hamas rose in September 2023, and The Washington Post wrote that the two were "on the brink of war". On September 13, five Palestinians were killed at the border. (Note: The Washington Post said the Palestinians were trying to explode the device, while Al-Jazeera said that a Palestinian Explosives Engineering Unit was trying to defuse the device.) Israel said it found explosives hidden in a shipment and halted all exports from Gaza; Hamas denied Israel's claims. Reuters quoted Palestinians who said that the several-day ban affected thousands of families. In response to the ban, Hamas put its forces on high alert and conducted military exercises with other groups, including openly practicing storming Israeli settlements. Hamas also allowed Palestinians to resume protests at the Gaza–Israel barrier. On September 29, Qatar, the UN, and Egypt mediated an agreement between Israeli and Hamas officials in the Gaza Strip to reopen closed crossing points and deescalate tensions; the total number of Gazans with work permits in Israel stood at 17,000.

=== Operational planning ===
For two years, Hamas used hardwired phone lines within Gaza's tunnel network, nicknamed the "Gaza metro", to covertly communicate, evade Israeli intelligence, and plan Operation Al-Aqsa Flood.

In the months preceding the attack, Hamas publicly released videos of its militants preparing to attack Israel. A video released in December 2022 showed Hamas training to take hostages, while another video showed Hamas practicing paragliding. On September 12, Hamas posted a video of its fighters training to blast through the border. After the attack, the IDF said that Hamas had extensively studied the military bases and communities near the border.

The Wall Street Journal has accused Iran of being behind the attack. U.S. officials and Iran have denied this.

According to a New York Times investigation, a memo dated August 24, 2022, and apparently written by Yahya Sinwar described a Hamas attack on Israel similar to October 7 attacks. It called for bulldozers to breach the Gaza-Israel fence and for multiple assault waves. It urged "Stomp on the heads of soldiers" and listed "opening fire on soldiers at point-blank range, slaughtering some of them with knives, blowing up tanks". It ordered entry into residential areas to set them on fire "with gasoline or diesel from a tanker", preparing "two or three operations" in which "an entire neighborhood, kibbutz, or something similar will be burned". It directed unit commanders to film and broadcast the acts to mobilize Palestinians in the West Bank, Arabs in Israel, and "our nation" to "join the revolution".

The IDF reportedly seized over 10,000 weapons following the attack. The arsenal included RPGs, mines, sniper rifles, drones, thermobaric rockets, and other advanced weapons. According to Israeli sources, documents and maps seized from Hamas militants indicated that Hamas intended a coordinated, month-long operation to invade and occupy Israeli towns, cities, and kibbutzim, including attacking Ashkelon by sea and reaching Kiryat Gat, 20 miles (32 km) into Israel. The scale of weapons, supplies, and plans indicated, according to Israel, that Hamas intended to inflict mass casualties on Israeli civilians and military forces over an extended period. Western and Middle Eastern security officials gathered evidence suggesting that Hamas intended to invade as far as the West Bank, had the initial attack been more successful.

=== Israeli intelligence failure ===
According to The New York Times, Israeli officials had obtained detailed attack plans more than a year before the attack. The document described operational plans and targets, including the size and location of Israeli forces, and raised questions in Israel about how Hamas learned these details. The document provided a plan that included a large-scale rocket assault before an invasion, drones to knock out the surveillance cameras and automated guns that Israel has stationed along the border, and gunmen invading Israel, including with paragliders. The Times reported, "Hamas followed the blueprint with shocking precision." According to The Times, the document was widely circulated among Israeli military and intelligence leadership, who largely dismissed the plan as beyond Hamas's capabilities, though it was unclear whether the political leadership was informed. In July 2023, a member of the Israeli signals intelligence unit alerted her superiors that Hamas was conducting preparations for the assault, saying, "I utterly refute that the scenario is imaginary". An Israeli colonel ignored her concerns.

The official investigation by Israel's domestic intelligence agency, Shin Bet, found that the agency failed to provide the warning that could have prevented the massacre. The head of Shin Bet convened a situation assessment in the early hours of October 7 to discuss the intelligence received from Gaza; in the end, only a low-level warning was issued, and a small team specialising in thwarting limited attacks was sent to the south. According to the report the counterintelligence service of Hamas had been highly effective in preventing the gathering of intelligence in Gaza.

According to the findings of the investigation, Shin Bet warned the Prime Minister that Hamas was not deterred and objected to the prevailing divide-and-rule policy of the Israeli government.

According to Haaretz, Shin Bet and IDF military commanders discussed a possible threat to the Nova music festival near kibbutz Re'im just hours before the attack, but the festival's organizers were not warned.

As revealed by a BBC investigation, surveillance reports suggested that Hamas was planning a significant operation against Israel, but senior IDF officers repeatedly ignored the warnings.

A Haaretz investigation found that incompetence in the IDF's higher ranks, including refusal to acknowledge Hamas's preparations for the attacks, was a major contributor to the severity of the October attacks. The IDF had reduced funding and manpower dedicated to observing Hamas, focusing primarily on rocket sites and ignoring Hamas training and troop movements, and the activities of the Hamas military leadership. Exercises in which Hamas attacks were simulated found the Gaza division's response lacking. Cultural conformity was fostered among officers and dissent discouraged. Senior officers often silenced subordinates to maintain their positions, contributing to a toxic atmosphere in which lower-ranking officers were apprehensive about questioning the decisions of their superiors - and tended to refrain from doing so.

The Israeli defense establishment had warned the Prime Minister that political upheavals related to the significant judicial overhauls had signaled to adversaries that the country was vulnerable, although that very apparatus had ignored its own detection of Hamas's "Walls of Jericho" mass-invasion plan a year prior to the event, as well as, the detection of border movements in the hours leading up to the invasion.

== Attacks ==
At around 6:30 a.m. Israel Summer Time (UTC+3) on Saturday, October 7, 2023, Hamas announced the start of Operation Al-Aqsa Flood. Al-Qassam Brigades commander Mohammed Deif gave a speech mentioning Israel's 16-year blockade of Gaza, Israeli incursions in West Bank cities, violence at Al-Aqsa mosque, Israeli settler violence with the army's support, the confiscation of property and demolition of homes, arbitrarily detaining Palestinians for years until "they wither from cancer and disease", Israel's neglect for international law, American-Western support, and international silence. He then described the operation, that they had drawn the line, and that it was to end "the last occupation on Earth". Shortly thereafter, Ismail Haniyeh made a similar announcement in a televised address.

=== Participating and supporting organizations ===
In addition to Hamas, several Palestinian militant groups voiced support for the operation and participated in it to some extent. The National Resistance Brigades, the armed wing of the Marxist–Leninist Democratic Front for the Liberation of Palestine (DFLP), confirmed their participation in the operation through their military spokesman Abu Khaled, saying it had lost three fighters in combat with the IDF. The PFLP (a Palestinian Marxist–Leninist / secular nationalist political party) and the Lions' Den group (a nonpartisan militant group based in the West Bank) voiced support for the operation and declared maximum alertness and general mobilization among their troops. Nine individuals employed by UNRWA were accused by Israel of participation, and after a months-long internal investigation, were fired for possible involvement.

=== Rocket fire ===
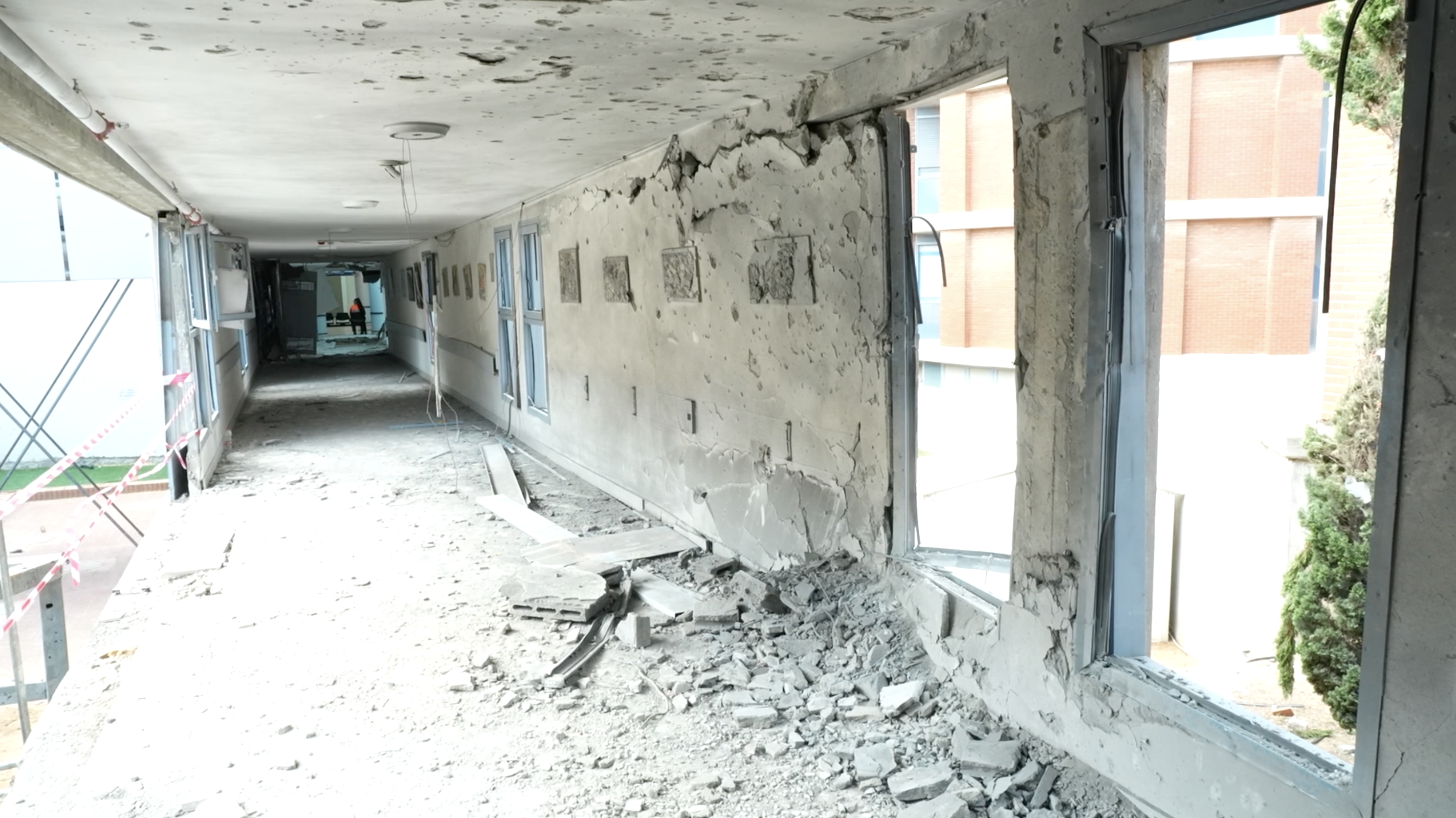
Aftermath of Hamas rocket hit on the maternity ward of Barzilai Medical Center, a hospital in southern Israel, during the Hamas-led attack on Israel

Deif said more than 5,000 rockets had been fired from the Gaza Strip into Israel in a span of 20 minutes at the start of the operation. Israeli sources reported the launch of 4,300 projectiles from Gaza, killing twelve and injuring dozens, most of them from the Bedouin community. Explosions were reported in areas surrounding Gaza and in the Sharon Plain, including Gedera, Herzliya, Beersheba, Tel Aviv, and Ashkelon. Air raid sirens were activated in Beersheba, Jerusalem, Rehovot, Rishon LeZion, and Palmachim Airbase. Hamas issued a call to arms, with Deif calling on "Muslims everywhere to launch an attack". In the evening Hamas launched another barrage of about 150 rockets towards Israel, with explosions reported in Yavne, Givatayim, Bat Yam, Beit Dagan, Tel Aviv, and Rishon LeZion.

=== Incursions into southern Israel ===
Approximate situation on October 7–8

Simultaneously, around 6,000 Palestinian militants and civilians infiltrated Israel from Gaza breaching the border in 119 places. The infiltration was executed using trucks, pickup trucks, motorcycles, bulldozers, speedboats, and powered paragliders.

In a raid on the Sderot police station, 30 Israeli policemen and civilians were killed. Early in the attack the computer systems were destroyed, disabling communication and delaying the response to the attacks.

Images and videos on social media showed heavily armed and masked militants dressed in black fatigues riding pickup trucks and opening fire in Sderot, killing dozens of Israeli civilians and soldiers and setting homes on fire. Other videos appeared to show Israelis taken prisoner, a burning Israeli tank, and militants driving Israeli military vehicles. Israeli first responders recovered documents from militants' bodies with instructions to attack civilians, including elementary schools and a youth center, to "kill as many people as possible", and to take hostages for use in future negotiations. The UN's Pramila Patten and Commission of Inquiry concluded in their reports that the authenticity of these alleged instruction documents, claimed to have been retrieved from Hamas militants, could not be substantiated. Some of the militants wore body cameras to record the acts, presumably for propaganda purposes. In recordings of Hamas commanders during the attack, published by The New York Times, one commander is heard saying: "Document the scenes of horror, now, and broadcast them on TV channels to the whole world", and "Slaughter them. End the children of Israel".

The morning of the attack, an Israeli military spokesman said that the militants from Gaza had entered Israel through at least seven locations and invaded four small rural Israeli communities, the border city of Sderot, and two military bases from both land and sea. Israeli media reported that seven communities came under Hamas control, including Nahal Oz, Kfar Aza, Magen, Be'eri, and Sufa. The Erez Crossing was reported to have come under Hamas control, enabling militants to enter Israel from Gaza. Israeli Police Commissioner Kobi Shabtai said there were 21 active high-confrontation locations in southern Israel.

The New York Times reported that an Israeli intelligence document prepared weeks after the attack found that Hamas had breached the border fence in over 30 separate locations.

Starting at 6:30 a.m. the same day, a massacre unfolded at an outdoor music festival near Re'im, resulting in at least 360 dead and many others missing. Witnesses recounted militants on motorcycles opening fire on fleeing participants, who were already dispersing due to rocket fire that had wounded some attendees; some were also taken hostage. Militants killed civilians at Nir Oz, Be'eri, and Netiv HaAsara, where they took hostages and set fire to homes, as well as in kibbutzim around the Gaza Strip. Around 50 civilians were killed in the Kfar Aza massacre, 108 in the Be'eri massacre, and 15 people in the Netiv HaAsara massacre. Militants killed 16 or 17 Thai and Nepalese employees during the Kibbutz Alumim massacre.

Other militants carried out an amphibious landing in Zikim. Palestinian sources claim that the local Israeli army base was stormed. The IDF said it had killed two attackers on the beach and destroyed four vessels, including two rubber boats. Militants also attacked a military base outside Nahal Oz, leaving 66 soldiers dead and taking seven hostage. An IDF fire investigation found that the militants had "ignited substances... that contain toxic gasses which can cause suffocation within minutes, or even less" both at the base and in civilian locations.

Hamas militants firing into a moving civilian car in Sderot

Militants killing Israeli civilians in kibbutz Mefalsim

Attack	Location		Israelis and foreign nationals				Destruction in the area	Militants from Gaza			Start time (Note: When militants arrived.)	End date
Attack	Name	Pop. (Note: Population data from 2024 unless otherwise stated.)	Total killed	Civilians killed (Note: Most of the civilian areas on the Israeli side of the Gaza border had lightly armed volunteer security teams.)	Combatants killed (Note: Usually includes only on duty police, military, and other professional armed security forces.)	Hostages and POWs	Destruction in the area	Number	Killed	POWs	Start time	End date
October 7 attacks on Israel	Gaza envelope and southern Israel	total pop. =	total =	total =	total =	total =	Gaza–Israel barrier, military bases, kibbutzim, moshavim	total ≈	total ≈	total =	06:29	
Erez Crossing attack	Erez crossing		9	0	9	3	crossing allegedly made unusable.	120	9 (Note: Dozens more militants were killed by airstrikes in the area)		06:42	October 7, 23:00
Erez attack	Kibbutz Erez	699	1	0	1	0		15–20	8		07:05	October 7, 10:30
Battle of Sderot	The town of Sderot	37,239	53	39	14	0	police station computer server and connections (Note: The militants destroyed the computer system and communications in the Sderot police station, which disabled emergency services communications for the region.)	41	39	2	06:58	October 8, 09:30
Nova music festival massacre	Music festival near Re'im	~3500 (Note: Attendance at the festival was reported to be 3,500 but figures vary. After the attack, relatives searching for missing loved ones said more than one thousand were at the event at the time of the attack. Some festival attendees estimated 3,000–4,000 people. An emergency medic who responded to the massacre at the festival placed attendance at 3,000.)	378	344	34	44	cars	110+	20		08:20	October 7, 15:00
Battle of Re'im	Re'im headquarters (Note: Headquarters of the Gaza Division.); Kibbutz Re'im	479	22	7	15	5		100	49		07:51	October 10, 20:00
Be'eri massacre	Kibbutz Be'eri	1,124	132	101	31	32	Surveillance tower	300+	100+	18	06:42	October 9
Nahal Oz attack	Nahal Oz lookout base	162	53	0	53	10	Base set on fire.	215	45+		06:45	October 7, 17:00
Nahal Oz attack	Kibbutz Nahal Oz	580	17	11	6	8		180+	80		07:05	October 7, 17:30
Kfar Aza massacre	Kibbutz Kfar Aza	964	80	56	24	19	Weapons tower destroyed with a drone	250	101 (Note: The bodies of 50 more militants were found outside of the kibbutz)	3	06:42	October 10, 17:00
Zikim attack	Zikim Training Base	141	7	0	7 (Note: Six officers and one recruit were killed in the fighting before the militants withdrew.)			120	9		07:24	October 7, 14:30
Zikim attack	Zikim beach Kibbutz Zikim	997	18	17	1 (Note: Three more soldiers were killed in the area on October 11)	0		38	32+ (Note: It is suspected but not confirmed that the final six militants were also killed)		06:36 (Note: Militants crossed into Israeli territorial waters on speedboats at this time, and engaged with the Israeli Navy three minutes later)	October 11
Nir Oz attack	Kibbutz Nir Oz	373	47	43	4	76 (Note: including the Bibas family) (Note: Includes nine people who died en route to or in the Gaza Strip during the attack)		500+	1+ (Note: Only one militant's body was found in the kibbutz, but it is suspected that other casualties were retrieved by their comrades) (Note: An additional 64 militants were killed outside of the kibbutz)		06:49	October 7, 12:30
Psyduck music festival massacre	Music festival between Nir Oz and Nirim	~100 (Note: Approximately 100 people took part in the event.)	17									
Nirim attack	Kibbutz Nirim	472	15	5	10	7		150	65		06:40	October 7, 14:00 (Note: Eight militants were killed outside of the kibbutz on October 8)
Netiv HaAsara massacre	Moshav Netiv HaAsara		17	14	3	0		10	1	4	06:42	October 7, 12:47
Alumim massacre	Kibbutz Alumim	578	62	57 (Note: Includes civilians fleeing the Nova music festival massacre killed outside of the kibbutz)	5	5		100	40	10	07:01	October 7
Kissufim massacre	Kibbutz Kissufim	356	44	16	28	1		150	55 (Note: Approximately 50 more militants were killed in the surrounding area)		06:55	October 12
Holit attack	Kibbutz Holit	223	16	13	3	9 (Note: Three hostages were abandoned by the militants after being taken into Gaza, allowing them to return to Israel)		60	20		06:59	October 9
Ein HaShlosha attack	Kibbutz Ein HaShlosha	379	4	3	1	0		40	1 (Note: Dozens more killed by airstrikes outside of the kibbutz)	1	06:58	October 7, 15:15
Nir Yitzhak attack	Kibbutz Nir Yitzhak	551	6	0	6	5		90	1 (Note: 100+ militants were killed crossing a border breach adjacent to the kibbutz)		07:30	October 7, 15:00
Battle of Nir Am	Kibbutz Nir Am	733	3	0	3	2		"Dozens" (Note: 10 militants arrived at 7:02, 12 at 7:24, and between 60 and 80 at 10:32)	"Dozens"		07:02	October 7
Battle of Ofakim	The town of Ofakim	39,893	33	25	8			15	15		06:40	October 8, 15:25
Battle of Sufa	Kibbutz Sufa	266	3	1	2			50	"Dozens"		06:52	October 7, 18:30
Mefalsim attack	Kibbutz Mefalsim	1,050	13 (Note: Includes Israeli security forces killed at the Sha'ar Hanegev Junction, the Black Arrow memorial, and a portion of Route 232 that connects the two sites, but does not include 77 civilians killed along Route 232)	0	13	0		200+			07:07	October 10, 17:00
Kerem Shalom attack	Kibbutz Kerem Shalom	231	6	0	6	0		100	9 (Note: Dozens of militants were also killed outside the kibbutz)		07:00	October 8

Table Footnotes:

==== Nova music festival ====
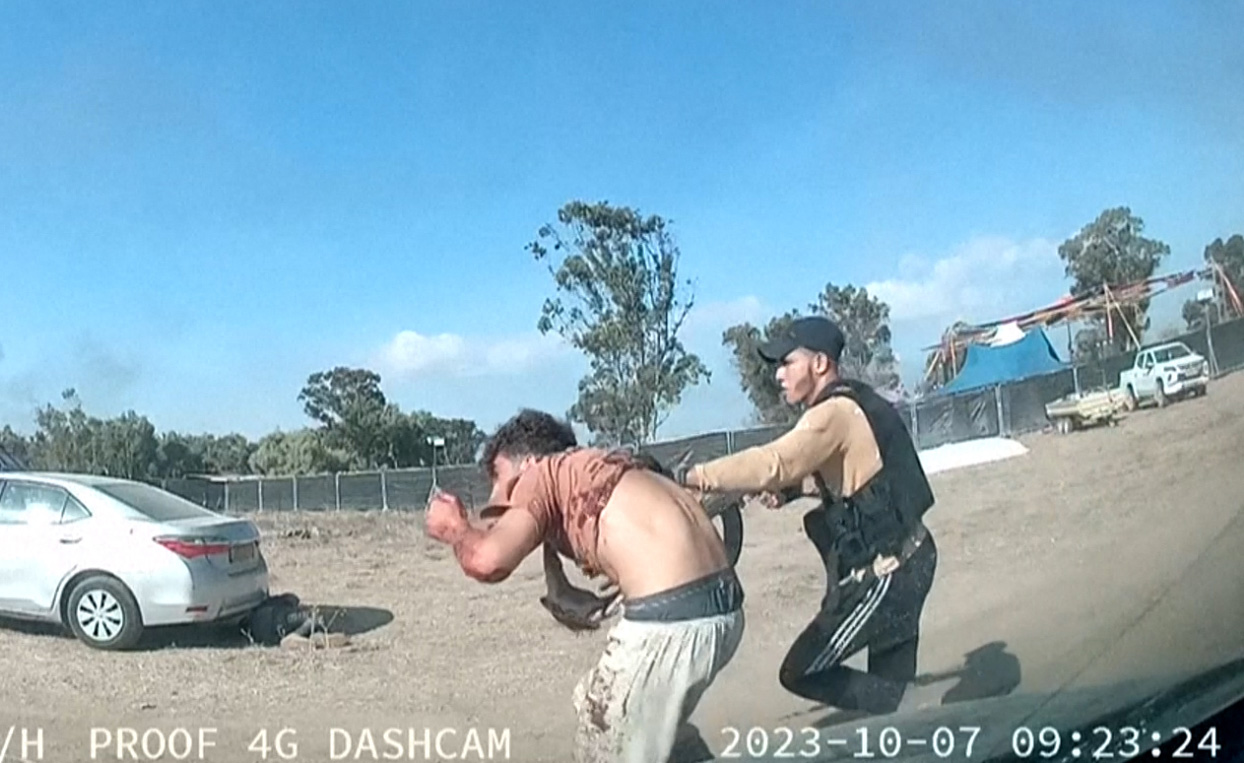
Militant abducting a man during the Re'im music festival massacre that left at least 360 people dead and others taken hostage

As part of the Hamas-led attack, 364 civilians were killed and many more wounded at the Supernova Sukkot Gathering, an open-air music festival celebrating the Jewish holiday of Sukkot near kibbutz Re'im. At least 40 hostages were also taken. This mass killing had the largest number of casualties out of a number of massacres targeting Israeli civilians in communities adjacent to Gaza that were part of the October 7 attack, alongside those at the communities of Netiv HaAsara, Be'eri, Kfar Aza, Nir Oz, and Holit.

At 6:30 a.m., around sunrise, rockets were noticed in the sky. Around 7:00 a.m., a siren warned of an incoming rocket attack, prompting festival-goers to flee. Subsequently, armed militants, dressed in military attire and using motorcycles, trucks and powered paragliders, surrounded the festival grounds and indiscriminately fired on people attempting to escape. Attendees seeking refuge nearby, in bomb shelters, bushes, and orchards, were killed while in hiding. Those who reached the road and parking lot were trapped in a traffic jam as militants fired at vehicles. The militants executed some wounded people at point-blank range as they crouched on the ground.

The massacre at the festival has been described as the largest terror attack in Israel's history and the worst Israeli civilian massacre ever.

==== Kfar Aza ====
During the Hamas-led attack, around 250 Hamas militants attacked Kfar Aza, a kibbutz about 3 kilometers (1.9 mi) from the border with the Gaza Strip, massacring 62 residents and abducting 19 hostages.

The kibbutz had more than 950 residents, and it took the IDF nearly three days to wrest back full control of it from militants that fortified themselves in houses of the kibbutz.

==== Be'eri ====
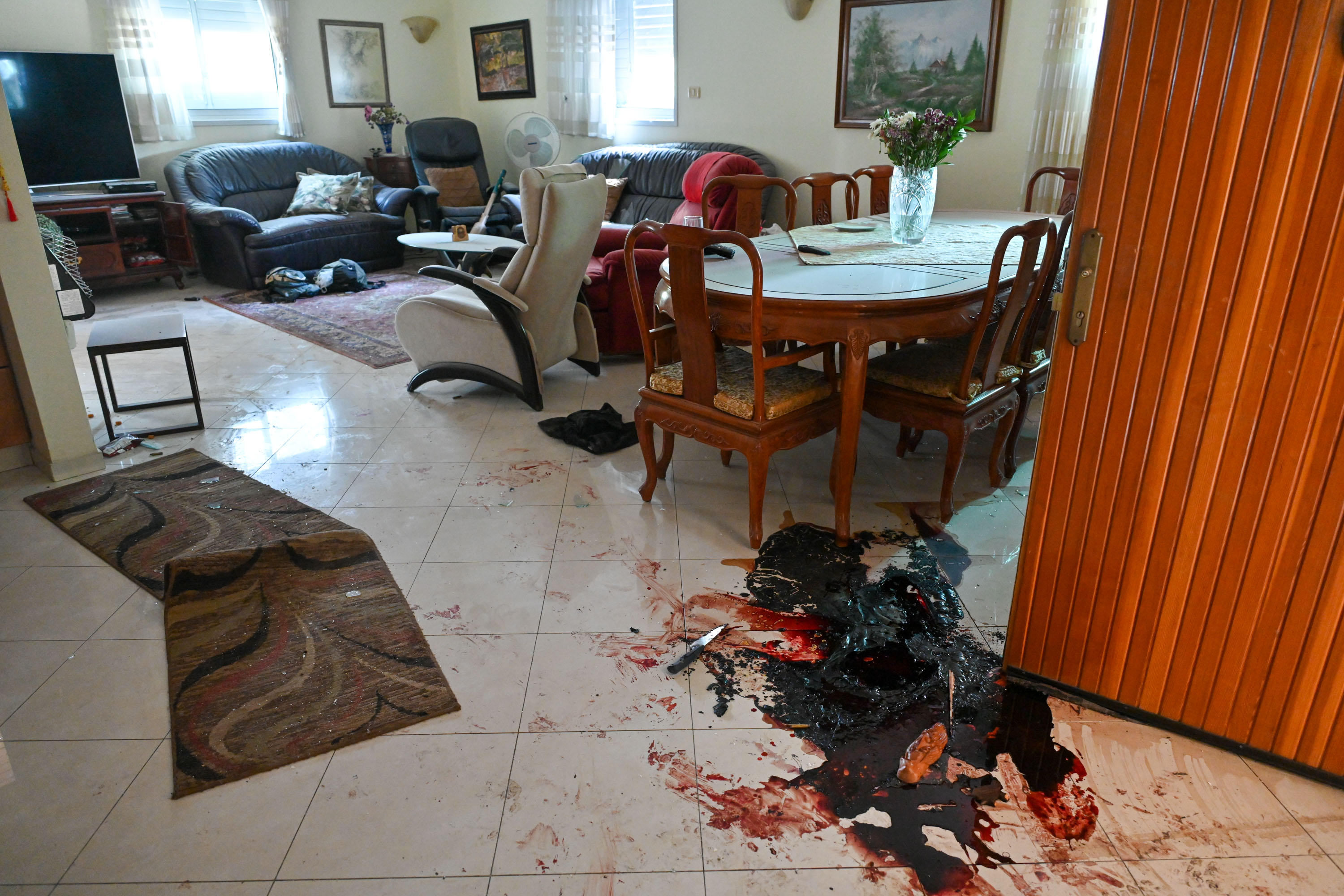
Blood inside a home in Be'eri

On the morning of the attack, around 70 Hamas militants carried out a massacre at Be'eri, an Israeli kibbutz near the Gaza Strip. At least 130 people were killed in the attack, including women (such as peace activist Vivian Silver), children, and infants, claiming the lives of 10% of the community's residents. Dozens of homes were also burned down. Several newspapers called the massacre an act of terrorism; some compared the brutality of the atrocities to that of ISIS. Hostages were taken, leading to a standoff with the IDF. According to survivors, there were also deaths from friendly fire; an Israeli tank fired on a house known to contain around 40 Hamas fighters and 14 hostages, among them two children, killing all hostages in the house but one.

==== Yakhini ====
A squad of Hamas militants that arrived in a van attacked the moshav of Yakhini. There were seven casualties in the moshav, including a border police officer. An IDF major in the Maglan unit was also injured. The community's security coordinator was on holiday in Thailand at the time and remotely directed the moshav's 18-person protection team's response. Yamam and Sayeret Matkal IDF units eventually arrived and killed all the attackers.

==== Ein HaShlosha ====
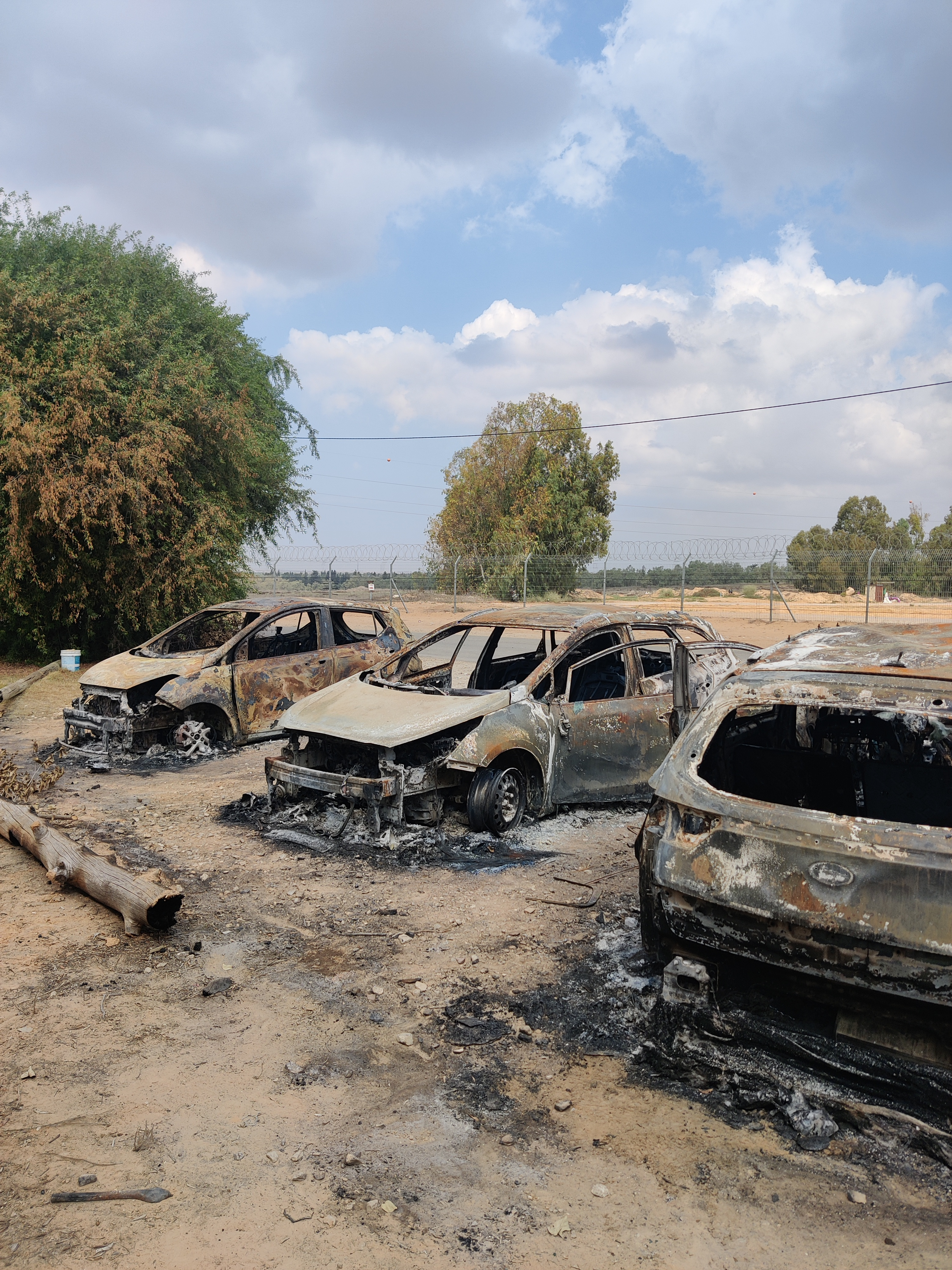
Burned vehicles from Nir Yitzhak kibbutz

Approximately 90 militants infiltrated kibbutz Ein HaShlosha, killing four civilians, looting, shooting, and burning houses. An 80-year-old Argentinian-Israeli woman died after her home was set on fire and she was unable to escape. A standoff between the attackers and the residents' security team lasted six hours. The leader of the security team, who was in his sixties, was killed in the firefight. A 63-year-old grandmother was also among those killed in the attack. A 39-year-old Israeli-Chilean woman was shot eight times.

Thirty survivors were discovered in the kibbutz three days after the attack, 14 of whom were Thai nationals.

==== Psyduck music festival ====
Psyduck was a small trance music festival that took place in the open fields near kibbutz Nir Oz, about 2 kilometres (1.2 mi) from the border of Gaza. The event drew around 100 participants. Hamas militants attacked the festival, killing 17 Israelis. Some were fatally shot at the festival site, while others were killed as they attempted to escape to nearby kibbutzim. Most survivors hid under small bushes until Israel Defense Forces rescued them a few hours later.

==== Re'im military base ====
At 10 a.m., less than five hours after the attacks began, fighting was reported at Re'im military base, headquarters of the Gaza Division. It was later reported that Hamas took control of the base and took several Israeli soldiers captive before the IDF regained control later in the day. The base was reportedly the location of IDF drone and surveillance operations. Hamas reportedly posted video of dead Israeli soldiers it had killed at the base.

==== Nir Am ====
Nir Am was attacked but no residents were harmed. Inbal Rabin-Lieberman, the 25-year-old security coordinator, alongside her uncle Ami, led a guard detail that killed multiple militants attempting to infiltrate a nearby chicken farm. They successfully deterred the rest of the invading militants from entering the community.

==== Ofakim ====
In the town of Ofakim, 47 were people killed in the October 7, attacks. Ofakim was the furthest point reached by the initial intense attacks on October 7. A large proportion of the population of the town is working-class Jews of North African descent. Ofakim was one of the first locations where a "hostages situation" was reported. The militants targeted the parts of the town where the housing was older and did not have individual bomb shelters in every home, and locals reported that the invaders had shot people who were trying to get to communal shelters.

==== Rahat ====
A number of Qassam Brigades militants infiltrated the Bedouin city of Rahat, north-east of Ofakim and 30 kilometres from Gaza, representing the furthest extent of the incursions by Palestinian militant groups on October 7. Over a month after the initial attack, two militants were arrested by Israeli police.

=== Failed plans ===
A Hamas group carried intelligence information and maps guiding it to the border of the West Bank, suggesting it had intentions of going all the way to the West Bank.

According to a report in Asharq Al-Awsat, two Hamas units had plans of reaching Shikma Prison in Ashkelon (13 km from the Gaza Strip) with the aim of freeing Palestinian inmates. One cell got lost and ended up in Sderot, at which point they were told to change their plans and operate in Sderot. A second cell which was operating in Zikim was commanded to go up to Ashkelon, but the cell was completely gunned down by Israeli security forces in Zikim.

There was an unrealized contingency plan that rested on Hezbollah commencing a concentrated bombardment of strategic targets in Israel that would facilitate a multi-front invasion to bring about Israel's "quick collapse." A "more limited dynamic" than "all-out war" ensued and "Israeli intelligence data revealed that the leaders of Iran and Hezbollah were 'deeply surprised' by the attack."

=== Hostages ===
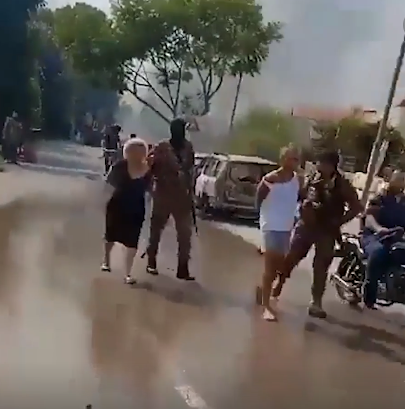
Hamas gunmen with civilian hostages

Soon after the start of the Hamas operation, there were reports that many civilians and soldiers had been taken as captives back to the Gaza Strip. Later in the day Hamas announced it had captured enough Israeli soldiers to force a prisoner swap, and Israel confirmed hostages had been taken.

In Be'eri, up to 50 people were taken hostage; after an 18-hour standoff between militants and IDF forces, they were freed. Hostages were also reported taken in Ofakim, where policemen led by Chief Superintendent Jayar Davidov engaged Palestinian militants in a shootout on October 7; Davidov and three of his men were killed, and the IDF later rescued two Israeli hostages in the suburb of Urim. There were reports of militants killing and stealing family pets.

Hamas took many hostages back to Gaza. On October 16, they said they were holding 250 hostages and that it had done so to force Israel to release its Palestinian prisoners. In addition to hostages with only Israeli citizenship, almost half of the hostages were foreign nationals or held multiple citizenships. Some hostages were Negev Bedouins. Some of the hostages, including three members of the Bibas family, were subsequently handed over to other militant groups. Palestinian Islamic Jihad ended up holding at least 30 of the hostages, but it is unclear whether they or Hamas originally kidnapped them.

According to Ariel Merari, the raiders "were ordered to kidnap as many [people] as possible... [and] they intentionally kidnapped a populace that is sensitive from the aspect of Israeli public opinion".

== Casualties ==
Gender percentage of October 7 deaths
Group	Source	% female	Ref.
Total	AOAV	26.6%	(Note: "Of the total of 1,004 victims whose gender is identified, 735 (73.4%) of these were male, and 278 (26.6%) female.")
Civilians	Walla/TOI	36%	(Note: "But the Walla news site has published data by age and gender for 756 of the murdered civilians for which information is available...two girls...11 female...162 women...59 women...69 women...seven women." That totals 272 female killed out of 756 total civilians dead.)
Civilians	AOAV	41%	(Note: "Civilians has 217 male and 153 female killed.)
Military	AOAV	11%	(Note: "Military has 298 male and 38 female killed.)
Other security forces	AOAV	15%	(Note: "Police and rescue" has 22 male and 4 female killed.)

The total number killed during the attack is 1,219, of whom at least 379 were from Israeli security forces and at least 810 were civilians (including 71 foreign). 26.6% of those killed were female. Initially up to 1,400 people were reported killed; on November 10, this was revised to 1,200, before being revised further in December. The casualties included 38 children; the youngest person killed was 10 months old, and 25 were over age 80. The attack was the deadliest day in Israel's history. According to the Center for Strategic and International Studies, the attack is the deadliest per capita terrorist attack. Some, including then-US President Joe Biden, have said it was also the deadliest day for Jews since the Holocaust. Others such as historian Enzo Traverso and Holocaust and Genocide scholar Raz Segal have warned against invoking the Holocaust in relation to October 7. Segal condemned the "weaponizations of Holocaust memory" by Biden, Israeli politicians and others.

The attack left over 3,400 wounded, and 251 soldiers and civilians were taken hostage. On October 19, Israeli officials reported an additional 100 to 200 missing. By July 2024, the number of missing was down to 1. Israeli casualties include about 70 Arab Israelis, predominantly from Negev Bedouin communities. The attack affected a province with a population of 4,000,000 Israelis, while the war displaced 300,000 Israelis.

On October 7, over 100 civilians were killed in the Be'eri massacre, including women and children, and over 270 people were killed at a music festival in Re'im. As of October 10, over 100 people had been reported killed in the Kfar Aza massacre, with the total death toll unknown. Nine people were fatally shot at a bus shelter in Sderot. At least four people were reported killed in Kuseife. At least 400 wounded were treated in Ashkelon, while 280 others were reported in Beer Sheva, 60 of whom were in serious condition. In the north, injuries from rocket attacks were reported in Tel Aviv. At least 49 Israeli children and adolescents under the age of 19 were killed in the attack.

Former Hapoel Tel Aviv F.C. striker Lior Asulin was among those killed in the Re'im music festival massacre. The head of the Sha'ar HaNegev Regional Council, Ofir Libstein, was killed in an exchange of fire with the militants. The police commander of Rahat, Jayar Davidov, was also killed. The IDF confirmed that 247 of its soldiers had been killed. Among those confirmed dead were Colonel Yonatan Steinberg, the commander of the Nahal Brigade, who was killed near Kerem Shalom; Colonel Roi Levy, commander of the Multidimensional "Ghost" unit, who was killed near kibbutz Re'im; and Lieutenant Colonel Eli Ginsberg, commander of the LOTAR Counter-terrorism Unit School. The Druze deputy commander of the 300th "Baram" Regional Brigade, Lieutenant Colonel Alim Abdallah, was killed in action along with two other soldiers while responding to an infiltration from southern Lebanon on October 9. Israeli peace activist Hayim Katsman was killed in Holit. Peace activist Vivian Silver, originally thought to be taken hostage, was later confirmed to have been killed during the attack on Be'eri. Israel Hayom photographer Yaniv Zohar was killed in Nahal Oz. The oldest person killed was Moshe Ridler, a 91 years old Holocaust survivor from kibbutz Holit. The youngest victim was Naama Abu Rashed, a Bedouin-Israeli, a baby delivered in an emergency procedure after the mother, who was nine months pregnant, was shot and killed in the attack. The baby survived for 14 hours before dying on October 7.

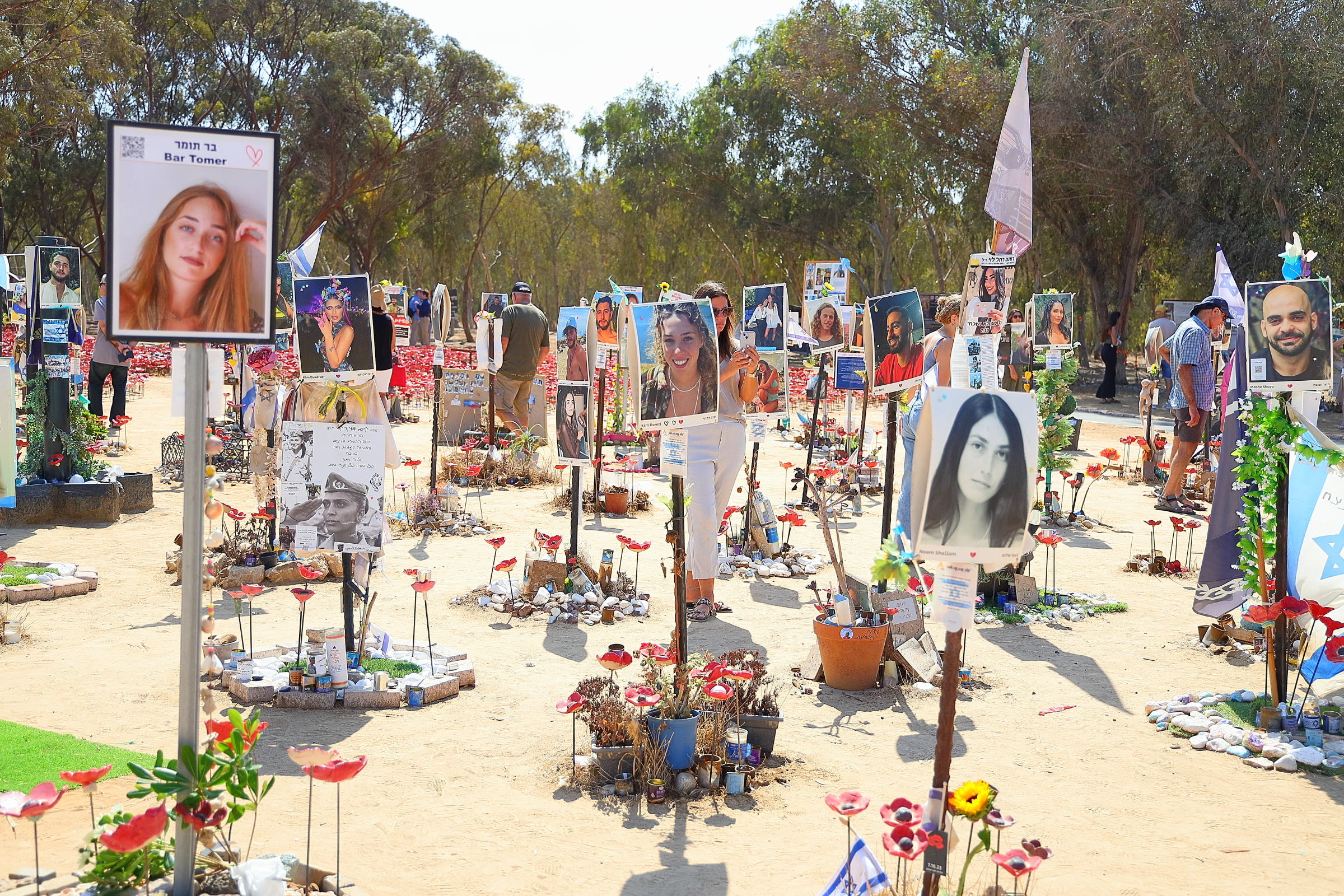
Israelis killed during Re'im music festival massacre

The great number and geographical spread of the victims made locating all of their remains difficult. Several weeks after the massacre, once conventional search techniques had been exhausted, the IDF approached the Israel Nature and Parks Authority for help in tracking the flight paths of vultures, which resulted in the discovery of at least five more bodies. The IDF also enlisted the aid of archaeologists from the Israel Antiquities Authority to help recover remains that were so badly burned as to be indistinguishable from the surrounding rubble; the remains of at least ten victims have been recovered this way.

Hamas took at 251 people hostage and transported them to Gaza. On October 8, Palestinian Islamic Jihad said it was holding at least 30 captives. At least four people were reportedly taken from Kfar Aza. Videos from Gaza appeared to show captured people, with Gazan residents cheering trucks carrying dead bodies. Four captives were later reported to have been killed in Be'eri, while Hamas said that an IDF airstrike on Gaza on October 9 killed four captives. Yedioth Ahronoth photographer Roy Edan was reported missing and likely captured alongside his child in Kfar Aza. His wife was killed and two of their children were able to hide in a closet until rescued. Edan's body was identified ten days later as one of the casualties of the Kfar Aza massacre. American-Israeli Hersh Goldberg-Polin was one of the kidnapped. On October 11, Hamas's Qassam Brigades released a video appearing to show the release of three hostages, a woman and two children, in an open area near a fence. Israel dismissed the video as "theatrics". According to Ynet, there were also casualties from friendly fire on October 7 which the IDF believed "it would not be morally sound to investigate [...] due to the immense and complex quantity of them that took place in the kibbutzim and southern Israeli communities due to the challenging situations the soldiers were in at the time."

=== Identification of remains ===
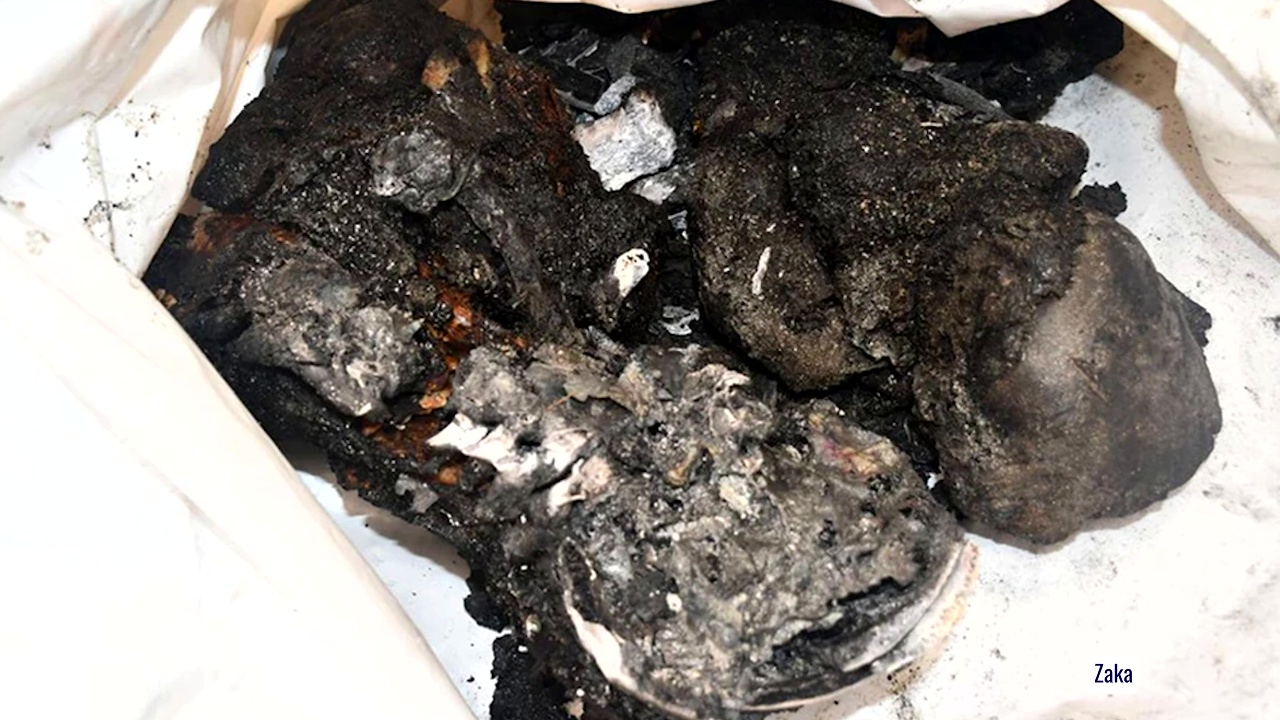
According to Chen Kugel, head of the Abu Kabir Forensic Institute, hundreds of bodies arrived at the institute in a state "beyond recognition".

According to Chen Kugel, head of the Abu Kabir Forensic Institute, hundreds of bodies arrived at the institute in a state "beyond recognition". Pathologists were required to process, among others, bone fragments recovered from fires; a blood-soaked baby mattress; victims who were tied, then executed; and two victims who were tied, then incinerated alive.

With hundreds missing and bodies burned beyond recognition, Israeli authorities assembled recovery teams from across society. This included archaeologists from the Israel Antiquities Authority, who identified and removed ancient remains in attempts to sift through ash and rubble for bone fragments other forensic teams overlooked.

The sheer number of casualties overwhelmed authorities. Bodies were brought chaotically to the Shura IDF base and Abu Kabir forensic institute. The different military, police, and civilian teams caused confusion. Archeologists systematically searched rooms, dividing them into grids and carefully extracting bone shards. At one house, the archeology team found a bloodstain under ash that it determined was the outline of a body, later identified by DNA analysis as Meni Godard.

=== Revision of casualty numbers ===
On November 10, Israel revised its casualty count from 1,400 to 1,200 after realizing that some bodies that were badly burned were those of Hamas fighters. This included 859 civilians, 283 soldiers, 58 policemen, and 10 Shin Bet members.

At the end of May 2024, using social security data, this was further revised to 1,189: 810 civilians (including 71 foreign nationals) and 379 security forces. One person, peace activist Bilha Inon, was classed as missing until August 6, 2024, when the IDF confirmed that she died at Netiv Ha'asara, with her husband.

== Reported atrocities ==
=== Sexual violence ===
Numerous reports found that Israeli women and girls were raped, assaulted, and mutilated by Hamas militants during the incursion. Hamas denies the reports. In the months following the attacks, The Wall Street Journal reported on December 21, there was "mounting evidence of sexual violence, based on survivor accounts, first responders and witnesses." Critics of Hamas denounced what they said was gender-based violence, war crimes, and crimes against humanity.

The BBC reported, "Videos of naked and bloodied women filmed by Hamas on the day of the attack, and photographs of bodies taken at the sites afterwards, suggest that women were sexually targeted by their attackers." Testimonies from those at the Shura Base where the victims bodies were brought, such as IDF Captain (Res.) Maayan, who is also a dentist, and Shari Mendes, a volunteer, claimed that there were signs of sexual abuse, including mutilations, broken limbs, and broken pelvises. Some of the released hostages also shared testimonies of sexual violence during their time in Gaza.

Some witness testimony was subsequently discredited, including the claim shared by among others Shari Mendes of the alleged stabbing of a pregnant woman and her fetus and several alleged rapes. Haaretz reported in April 2024 that, "according to a source knowledgeable about the details, there were no signs on any of those bodies [at Shura Base, to which most of the bodies were taken for purposes of identification] attesting to sexual relations having taken place or of mutilation of genitalia." It also said that due to the lack of forensic pathologists at most a quarter of the bodies could be fully examined, and for at least one hundred bodies conclusions could not be drawn given their deteriorated state. Israeli forensic pathologists in charge of the process later clarified that all bodies had been examined, and some were disfigured or burned.

A two-month New York Times investigation by Jeffrey Gettleman, Anat Schwartz, and Adam Sella, Screams Without Words, released in late December 2023, reported finding at least seven locations where sexual assaults and mutilations of Israeli women and girls were carried out. It concluded that these were not isolated events but part of a broader pattern of gender-based violence during the October 7 massacres. The probe was said to have been based on video footage, photographs, GPS data from mobile phones, and interviews with more than 150 people. According to reporting by The Intercept, the New York Times investigation has been criticized, both externally and internally by other employees, for apparent discrepancies in witness accounts and lax evidentiary standards. On December 30, The Daily Telegraph wrote: "First responders to massacre saw raped and abused bodies, but the rapidity of events—and cultural taboos—may leave the truth uncovered". Al-Jazeera said that, "while isolated rapes may have taken place", the "allegations of widespread and systematic rape", allegations it said "were used repeatedly by politicians in Israel and the West to justify the ferocity of the subsequent bombardment of the Gaza Strip", were false. On March 25, 2024, The New York Times reported that new video had surfaced, contradicting the account of an Israeli military paramedic previously interviewed by the Times that two teenagers murdered in Be'eri had also been sexually assaulted.

Pramila Patten, the UN's special envoy on sexual violence in conflict, reported in March 2024 that there were "reasonable grounds" to believe sexual assaults including rape and gang rape took place in multiple locations during the October 7 attacks. Patten also reported receiving "clear and convincing information" that some of the hostages held by Hamas had suffered rape and sexualized torture and that there were "reasonable grounds" to believe such abuses were "ongoing". The report stemmed from an unprecedented fact-finding mission to "verify information" and was not a full and legal investigation as Patten's office lacks such a mandate. It was thus unable to establish anything beyond a reasonable doubt. As American journalist Azadeh Moaveni reported: "Her office didn't have a mandate to investigate sexual crimes on the ground and had never undertaken such a mission before. I was told by multiple sources at the UN that her trip was a matter of fierce controversy within the organisation." Patten's report also did not determine that the sexual violence was systematic in nature, did not attribute it to Hamas or other factions, did not find evidence of it being planned, and remained agnostic on its scope. Patten was also unable to find some evidence that Israeli politicians insisted existed, including video and photographic evidence of rape. The report concludes that "specific attribution of the violations would require a fully-fledged investigation". Later, Patten, the UN's special representative, requested permission to investigate Hamas's alleged crimes, on condition that her team should also be allowed to access Israeli detention facilities to examine claims of sexual violence by Israeli soldiers, but the request was denied.

The UN's Independent International Commission of Inquiry on the Occupied Palestinian Territory released an in-depth investigative report on June 12, 2024, which found that both Hamas and Israel had committed sexual violence and torture, along with intentional attacks on civilians. The report was created by information compiled from interviews of victims, witnesses, open sourced items, forensic medical reports, and satellite imagery. Israel had previously announced its refusal to cooperate with the inquiry and rejected the allegations. The commission found that Palestinian forces were responsible for incidents "indicative of sexual violence" at the Re'im festival and the Nahal Oz military outpost, as well as several kibbutzim. The report concluded there was a "pattern indicative of sexual violence" by Palestinian forces during the attack, and that Hamas and other militant groups were responsible for gender-based violence "by willful killings, abductions, and physical, mental and sexual abuse". The commission was unable to independently verify testimony of genital mutilation, sexual torture and rape, citing a lack of access to witnesses and crime scenes, and Israel's obstruction of its investigations. It also found no evidence that Palestinian forces had been ordered to commit sexual violence. In addition, the Commission found some specific allegations to be false or contradictory.

In June 2024, The Times published a detailed investigative report concluding that Israel's claims about the scale and the formally sanctioned, systematic nature of sexual assaults did not stand up to scrutiny.

As of January 2025, the former head of the security cases division in Israel's Southern District prosecutor's office said that no case was being filed due to a lack of evidence and complainants, which she said could be due to victims being dead or unwilling to come forward.

On 12 May 2026, the Israeli non-governmental organisation Civil Commission on October 7 Crimes by Hamas Against Women and Children published Silenced No More, a roughly 290-page report on sexual and gender-based violence during the 7 October 2023 attacks and against hostages held in Gaza. The report concluded that sexual and gender-based violence was "systematic, widespread, and integral" to the attack and its aftermath. It identified thirteen recurring patterns of abuse, including rape and gang rape, sexual torture and mutilation, forced nudity, executions linked to sexual violence, and abuse during captivity. The commission argued that the repetition of these patterns across several locations, including the Nova music festival, roads, homes, kibbutzim, military bases and places of captivity in Gaza, showed that the violence was not a set of isolated incidents but part of a broader method of terror and humiliation.

=== Torture and mutilation ===
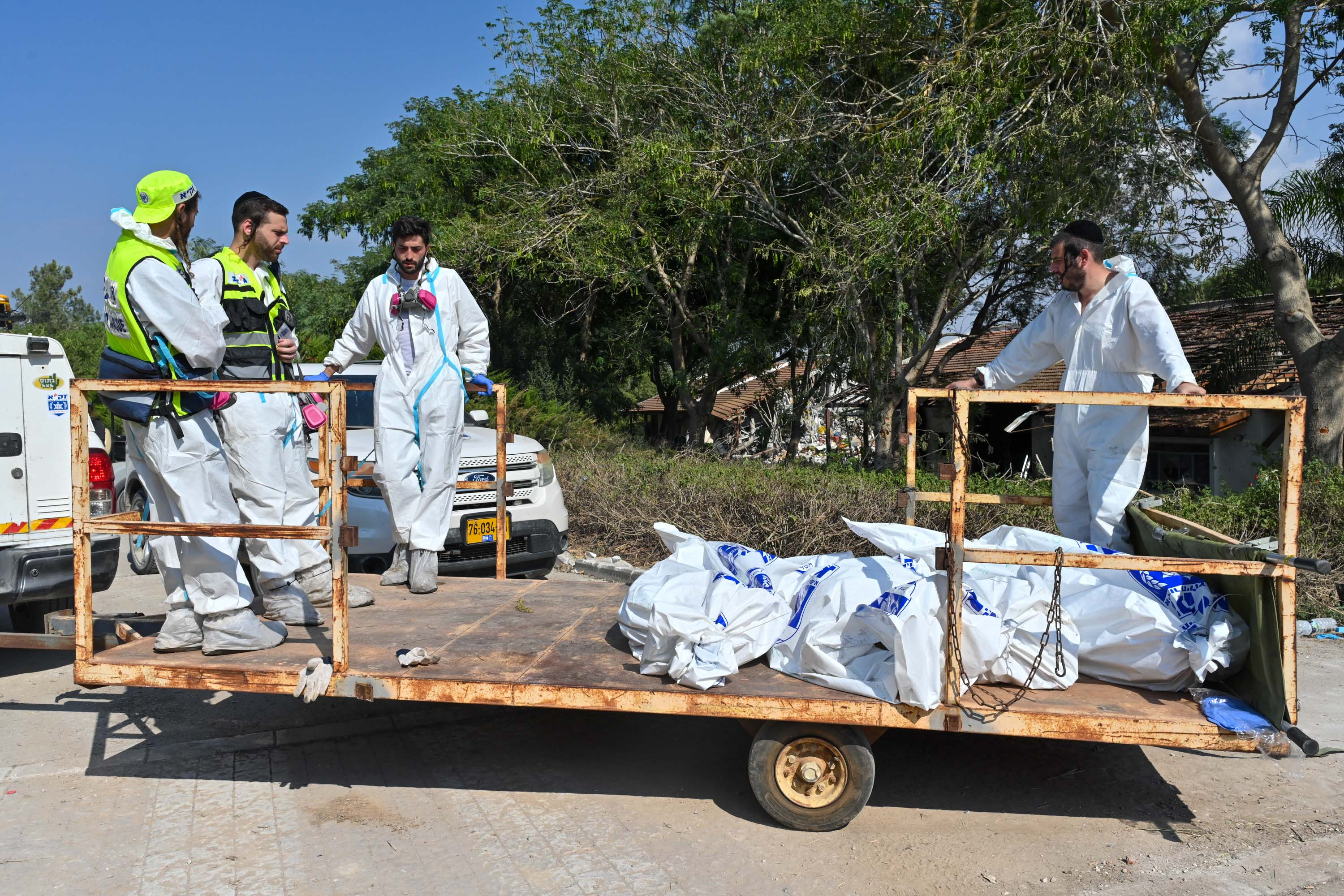
Dead bodies after the Be'eri massacre

US Secretary of State Antony Blinken described photos that Israeli Prime Minister Benjamin Netanyahu and the Israeli government privately showed him: "a baby, an infant, riddled with bullets. Soldiers beheaded. Young people burned alive. I could go on, but it's simply depravity in the worst imaginable way." Israeli forces in Kfar Aza and Be'eri reported that they found bodies of victims mutilated. One IDF commander falsely told an I24NEWS reporter that 40 babies had been killed, out of what one estimate described as at least 100 civilian victims; Instead, two babies are known to have died as a result of the attack, one from a bullet, and one in a hospital shortly after birth.

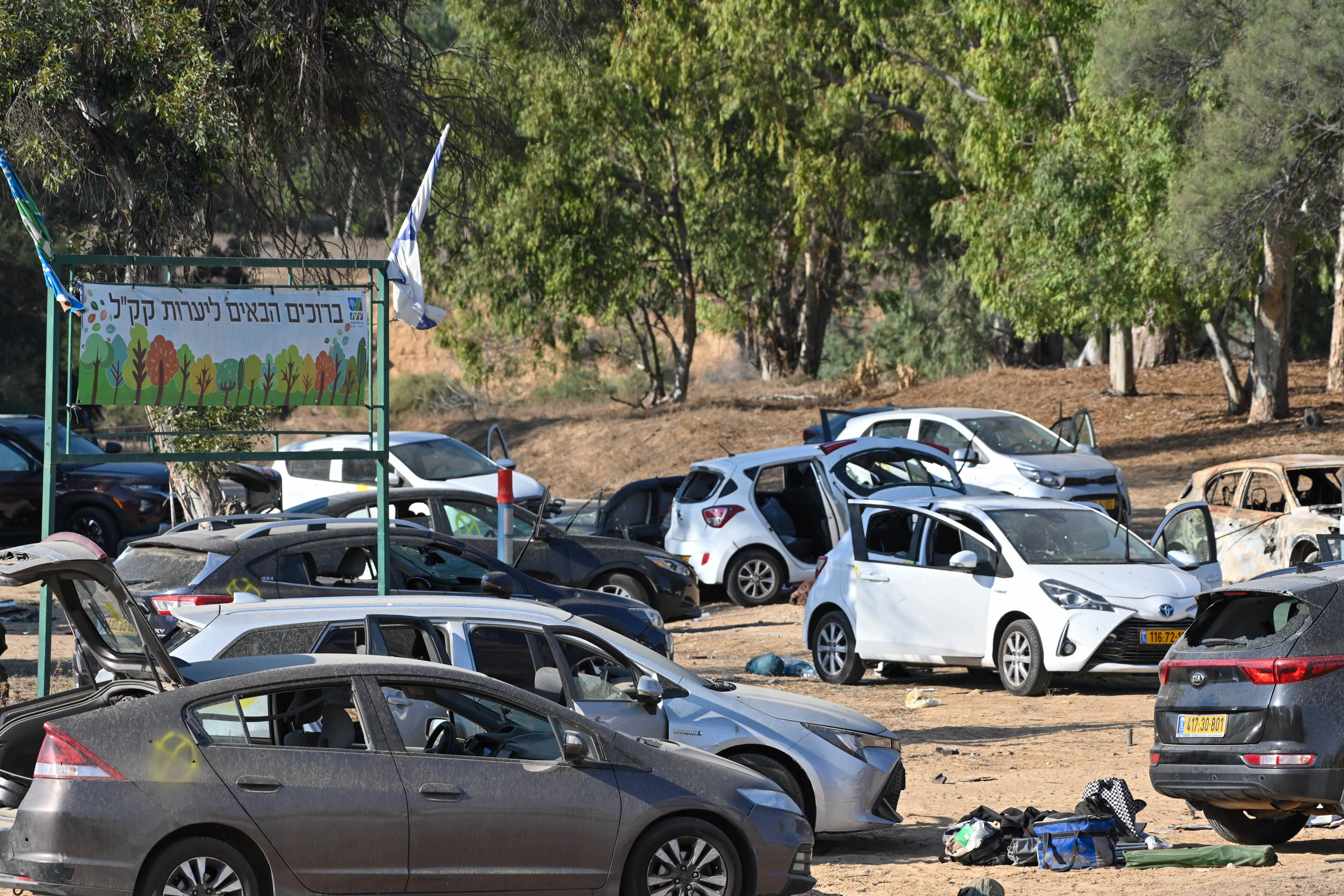
Abandoned and damaged cars after the Re'im music festival massacre

ZAKA volunteers acting as first responders spread other false reports of this type. In one, a ZAKA volunteer said groups of children were found tied up and burned alive. Other reported atrocities included sexual assaults, rapes, and mutilations; some victims were reportedly bound, and some victims' bodies desecrated. Graeme Wood reported that the video footage retrieved from body cameras the attackers wore showed several victims who "in the beginning of the footage... are alive, [and] by the end they're dead. Sometimes, in fact frequently, after their death their bodies are still being desecrated." Other videos show attackers shooting at children, executing men in civilian clothing, throwing grenades into civilian shelters, and an attempted decapitation.

First response personnel recovering the bodies reported being extremely distressed by the evidence of atrocities they encountered, and said they placed the bodies of Hamas militants in body bags marked with an "X" and removed them with a bulldozer.

Israeli security agencies released videos that the Times of Israel described as alleged confessions of Hamas attackers, in which the subjects said they were ordered to kill, behead, cut off limbs and rape. Human Rights Watch, Amnesty International and Physicians for Human Rights Israel stated that these alleged confessions were likely extracted under torture, should not be accepted as credible evidence, and called on the Israeli government to cease their production and publication.

A former chief rabbi of the Israeli army, part of the team identifying bodies, said there were many instances of rape and torture, and an Israeli reserve warrant officer said that forensic exams had discovered multiple cases of rape, though neither provided forensic evidence to support the claims. Haaretz reported in April 2024 that no such forensic evidence exists. CNN has interviewed several Israelis who witnessed the aftermath of the attack, who reported visible signs of rape and excessive violence on the bodies of women and girls from several sites. The Intercept called into question the credibility of some of these testimonies, also cited in other reports such as The New York Times' Screams Without Words.

A Haaretz investigation into the claims of mutilation and torture found that "Members of Hamas and Palestinian Islamic Jihad, as well as other Gazans who entered Israel, committed war crimes and crimes against humanity." Regarding "testimonies about Hamas's atrocities on October 7", Haaretz found that "Most are supported by extensive evidence, but a few have been proved untrue, providing ammunition to deniers of the historic massacre." Haaretz found several cases where Israeli search and rescue units, the army, and politicians disseminated inaccurate information. An Israeli army officer claimed that babies had been hung on clotheslines; later investigations showed that exactly one infant was killed, alongside her father, and that the reports of groups of children being slaughtered and mutilated were false. A total of five children under age six were killed, and another 14 between ages 12 and 15 were killed in rocket attacks from Gaza. Most of the children were killed alongside family members.

Haaretz reported that "Hamas terrorists did desecrate corpses during the massacre, especially the bodies of soldiers. There were also beheadings and cases of dismemberment" but that "there is no evidence that children from several families were murdered together, rendering inaccurate Netanyahu's remark to U.S. President Joe Biden that Hamas terrorists 'took dozens of children, tied them up, burned them and executed them.'" ZAKA volunteers shared stories of atrocities, with one repeatedly describing 20 children having been bound and burned at a kibbutz; the same volunteer said a pregnant woman had her unborn baby cut from her womb and that he had found the woman next to a murdered child aged six or seven. But the list of dead does not correspond to the claims, and no children of that age were killed in the kibbutz; the kibbutz has denied that the story is related to the kibbutz. Sara Netanyahu, the Israeli prime minister's wife, sent U.S. first lady Jill Biden a letter claiming that a heavily pregnant woman was taken hostage to Gaza; the woman was identified as a Thai worker who had been taken hostage and later released. She was not pregnant and had not given birth.

Blinken also repeated some of the evidence given by the same ZAKA volunteer, describing a scene the volunteer said he found in Be'eri: "a young boy and girl, 6 and 8 years old, and their parents around the breakfast table. The father's eye gouged out in front of his kids. The mother's breast cut off, the girl's foot amputated, the boy's fingers cut off before they were executed." Haaretz reported in December 2023 that "no children 6 or 7 or near those ages were killed on Be'eri". The Intercept similarly said no one killed in Be'eri matched this account and expressed mystification that U.S. media kept citing ZAKA, even though their testimony was debunked in Israeli media.

On October 20, a forensic analysis was presented to the media at Israel's National Center of Forensic Medicine that claimed to show evidence of victims burned alive with bound hands. The analysis suggested that one CT scan of charred remains showed an adult bound to a child at the time of death. Many victims were described as having soot in their trachea, indicating that they burned to death.

Two or three decapitations of adults or military-age teenagers have been confirmed, one or two IDF soldiers (beheaded after death in combat) and a foreign worker. Adir Tahar, age 19, from the Golani Brigade, was killed in combat by multiple grenades on October 7. After his death, his head was removed and taken to the Gaza Strip where it was found later in the freezer of an ice cream store, inspiring speculation about why it had been taken there. His body was identified by DNA and buried incomplete. The IDF tried to hide from his family that there was only an incomplete body to bury. A second burial ceremony was held after his head was recovered.

=== Unsubstantiated reports of beheaded babies and children ===
Several Israeli sources said in the aftermath of the attack that there were bodies of multiple beheaded infants in Kfar Aza. Later the Israeli government said it could not confirm the veracity of the claim and several investigations found it to be untrue.

In its investigation Le Monde concluded that the unverified claim is false, although it became a significant element in the information war, with Israeli authorities intentionally maintaining ambiguous messaging that helped spread the narrative despite lack of confirmation: "Israel has done nothing to fight it and has more often tried to instrumentalize it than deny it, fueling accusations of media manipulation." Some opponents of Israel in turn also instrumentalized the false claim; Pro-Palestinian influencer Sulaiman Ahmed used the claim to deny the reality of Hamas killings, while conspiracist Jackson Hinkle used it to argue that Israel "has lied about everything." The issue continues to be sensitive, with pro-Palestinian influencers and conspiracists seeing it as "fake news" spread by a "genocidal army of occupation", while on the Israeli side questioning it is likened to Holocaust denial. "Denied internationally, the rumor remains alive and well within Israel."

=== Use of hostages as human shields ===
During the October 7 assault, Human Rights Watch reported two instances where Palestinian militants used Israeli civilians as human shields. In Be'eri, fighters held civilians in a home and threatened to kill them if Israeli forces attacked. When the Israelis did fire, it led to the deaths of militants and hostages. In Nahal Oz, a fighter used 17-year-old Tomer Arava Eliaz to move between homes and potentially block attacks, and Tomer was later found dead. A purported "hostage detention plan" suggested using hostages as human shields, but its authenticity could not be verified by Human Rights Watch.

== Aftermath ==
=== Military operations ===
After the initial breach of the Gaza perimeter by Palestinian militants and civilians, it took hours for the Israeli military to send troops to counterattack. The first helicopters were launched from the north of Israel, and arrived in Gaza an hour after fighting began. Israel had difficulty determining which outposts and communities were occupied, and distinguishing between Palestinian militants and the soldiers and civilians on the ground.

After clearing militants from its territory, Israel launched a bombing campaign and invaded Gaza on 27 October. The bombing campaign began at 9:45 am, and at 10:00 am Israel claimed responsibility for the attacks. The IDF declared a state of emergency for areas within 80 kilometers (50 mi) of the Gaza border and began targeted actions in Gaza.

In a televised broadcast, Netanyahu said: "We are at war." He also said that the IDF would reinforce its border deployments to deter others from "making the mistake of joining this war". In a later address, he threatened to "turn Gaza into a deserted island" and urged its residents to "leave now". Israel's Security Cabinet voted to undertake actions to bring about the "destruction of the military and governmental capabilities of Hamas and Palestinian Islamic Jihad", according to a statement by the Prime Minister's Office. The Israel Electric Corporation, which supplies up to 80% of Gaza's electricity, cut off power to the area.

USA Today reported that in the days following the attacks, Israel ordered the killing of Hamas, Hezbollah, and Iranian leaders whom Netanyahu held responsible, including Iran's supreme leader Ali Khamenei, who was killed during the 2026 Iran war. According to a May 2026 report by The Wall Street Journal, Israel built a list of the Palestinians who partook in the attacks using facial recognition software on videos and pictures posted by militants during and after the attacks, along with intercepted phone calls, and created a unit tasked with killing or capturing each of them. The list includes high-ranking militant leaders and individuals who played a minimal role in the assault, such as the man who drove a tractor through the Gaza border fence on October 7 and was killed two years later. By July 2026 The Times of Israel reported that out of the estimated 5,000 participants, 1,500 were killed during the Gaza war, in addition to 1,200 who were killed during the October 7 attacks. In October 2026, defense minister Israel Katz said that 4,000 out of 6,000 participants had been killed.

=== Friendly fire and use of the Hannibal Directive ===
According to a December 2023 Ynet article, there was also an "immense and complex quantity" of friendly-fire incidents during the October 7 attack. Helicopter crews initially poured down fire at a tremendous rate, attacking about 300 targets in four hours. Later, the crews began to slow their attacks and carefully select targets. According to Haaretz journalist Josh Breiner, a police source said that a police investigation found that an IDF helicopter that had fired on Hamas militants "apparently also hit some festival participants" in the Nova music festival massacre. The Israeli police denied the report. Subsequent investigation has determined that militants had been instructed not to run so that the air force would think they were Israelis. This deception worked for some time, but pilots began to realize the problem and ignore their restrictions. By around 9 a.m., amid the chaos, some helicopters started laying down fire without prior authorization. It is unclear how many hostages were killed by friendly fire.

In January 2024, an investigation by Israeli newspaper Yedioth Ahronoth concluded that the IDF had in practice applied the Hannibal Directive, ordering all combat units to stop "at all costs" any attempt by Hamas militants to return to Gaza, even if there were hostages with them. According to Yedioth Ahronoth, around 70 burnt-out vehicles on roads leading to Gaza had been fired on by helicopters or tanks, killing all occupants in at least some cases.

A report by a UN Commission published in June 2024 found "strong indications" that the Israeli security forces used the Hannibal Directive in several instances on October 7. In one example, a tank crew confirmed that they had applied the directive when they shot at a vehicle suspected of carrying kidnapped Israeli soldiers. The report also said that in two instances, Israeli forces "had likely applied the Hannibal Directive," resulting in the killing of up to 14 Israeli civilians.

A July 2024 Haaretz investigation concluded that the IDF ordered the Hannibal Directive to be used, adding: "Haaretz does not know whether or how many civilians and soldiers were hit due to these procedures, but the cumulative data indicates that many of the kidnapped people were at risk, exposed to Israeli gunfire, even if they were not the target." One of these decisions was made at 7:18 A.M., when an observation post reported someone had been kidnapped at the Erez crossing, close to the IDF's liaison office. "Hannibal at Erez" came the command from divisional headquarters, "dispatch a Zik." The Zik is an unmanned assault drone, and the meaning of this command was clear, Haaretz reported. At 10:32 AM, an order was issued to all battalions in the area to fire mortars towards Gaza. Documents obtained by Haaretz and the testimonies of soldiers show that use of the Hannibal Directive was "widespread" after an order was issued to the Gaza Division at 11:22 AM that "Not a single vehicle can return to Gaza."

A source in the Southern Command of the IDF told Haaretz:

Everyone knew by then that such vehicles could be carrying kidnapped civilians or soldiers...There was no case in which a vehicle carrying kidnapped people was knowingly attacked, but you couldn't really know if there were any such people in a vehicle. I can't say there was a clear instruction, but everyone knew what it meant to not let any vehicles return to Gaza.

At 2:00 p.m., all units were instructed not to leave border communities or chase anyone into Gaza, as the border was under heavy, indiscriminate fire. Haaretz further reported that at 6:40 P.M. military intelligence believed militants were intending to flee back to Gaza in an organized manner from near Kibbutz Be'eri, Kfar Azza and Kissufim. In response the army launched artillery at the border fence area, very close to some of these communities. Shells were also fired at the Erez border crossing shortly thereafter. The IDF says it is not aware of any civilians being hurt in these bombardments. Haaretz notes one case in which it is known that civilians were hit, in the house of Pessi Cohen at Kibbutz Be'eri. 14 hostages were in the house as the IDF attacked it, with 13 of them killed. It is unknown if the directive was used in that instance. An IDF probe published in late July 2024 did not definitively establish a cause of death for the 13 hostages, but reported that most were likely murdered by Hamas militants.

In a September 2024 report by Australia's ABC News, former Israeli officer, Air Force Colonel Nof Erez, is quoted as saying: "This was a mass Hannibal. It was tons and tons of openings in the fence, and thousands of people in every type of vehicle, some with hostages and some without." The report also notes Tank officers confirming their interpretation of the Directive, firing on vehicles returning to Gaza, potentially with Israelis on board. "My gut feeling told me that they [soldiers from another tank] could be on them," tank captain Bar Zonshein told Israel's Channel 13.

== Reactions ==
=== Allegations of genocide ===
According to several international law and genocide studies experts, Hamas's assault amounted to genocide. Legal and genocide experts have condemned the attack, saying it represents a serious violation of international law. They argue that Hamas carried out these actions with the intent to destroy the Israeli national group. Some commentators point to Hamas's original 1988 founding charter (not to be confused with the revised 2017 Hamas charter), which advocated for the destruction of Israel, contained antisemitic language, and, according to certain researchers, implied a call for the genocide of Jews. Some legal experts have suggested that Hamas's targeting of families should be defined as a new crime called "kinocide".

=== Palestinian response ===
==== Hamas ====
Khaled Mashal, the chairman of the Hamas Political Bureau from 1996 to 2017 and later co-chairman, lauded the Hamas attack, calling it legitimate resistance to Israeli occupation. He said, "We know very well the consequences of our operation on Oct. 7", emphasizing that Palestinian lives must be sacrificed in the quest for liberation.

Khalil al-Hayya, a senior member of Hamas and also later a co-chairman of the Hamas Political Bureau, said the action was necessary to "change the entire equation and not just have a clash... We succeeded in putting the Palestinian issue back on the table, and now no one in the region is experiencing calm."

Ghazi Hamad, a senior Hamas official, said in an interview: "We must teach Israel a lesson, and we will do this again and again. The Al-Aqsa Flood is just the first time, and there will be a second, a third, a fourth. Because we have the determination...to fight." He emphasized Hamas's willingness to "pay a price", concluding with a call for the elimination of Israel: "We must remove that country because it constitutes a security, military and political catastrophe to the Arab and Islamic nations".

Hamas denied killing any children in the attack. Its official announcement referring to the event rejected the "falsehood of the fabricated allegations" promoted by some Western media outlets. When asked about the Re'im music festival massacre, where 260 civilians were murdered, Hamas official Mousa Abu Marzook replied that it was a "coincidence", and that the attackers may have thought these were soldiers "resting".

In early November 2023, in an interview with Lebanese newspaper Al Liwaa, Hamas leader Osama Hamdan reiterated that the group had no regrets for the attacks and that they were "aimed at ending Israel's attempts to bring an end to the Palestinian cause and to build local alliances that will remove the Palestinian people from history."

On November 8 2023, Taher El-Nounou, a Hamas media adviser, said that he hoped "that the state of war with Israel will become permanent on all the borders, and that the Arab world will stand with [Hamas]". While there was agreement that his hope of war expansion reflected an underlying motivation for the October 7 attacks which in his view furthered the Palestinian cause, it was alternately interpreted as fitting Hamas's new identification as "fundamentally an armed force, unrelentingly committed to destroying Israel" by The New York Times or as it being framed by the group as a necessary response to Palestinian suffering as a result of Israel's "intense" bombardment, and part of a strategy "to derail talks over Israel normalizing relations with regional powers — namely, Saudi Arabia — and draw the world's attention to [said people's] cause" by Business Insider.

In January 2024, Hamas released a report titled "Our Narrative", which accepted "some faults" but continued to deny having intentionally targeted civilians, blamed Israel for deaths, and justified the attacks as "a necessary step and a normal response to confront all Israeli conspiracies against the Palestinian people".

==== Palestinian Authority ====
On the eve of the Hamas attack at the emergency meeting in Ramallah, Palestinian President Mahmoud Abbas said that the Palestinian people had the right to defend themselves against the terror of settlers and occupation troops. According to Palestinian government agency WAFA, Abbas also ordered the government and relevant authorities to immediately send all available resources to alleviate the suffering of Palestinians in Gaza under Israeli aggression. On October 16, he declared that "Hamas's actions don't represent the Palestinians".

On October 30, Hanan Ashrawi, a Palestinian Christian official, said the attacks were an act of resistance launched against the IDF.

In March 2024, Fatah – the party that controls the Palestinian Authority – released a statement accusing Hamas of "having caused the return of the Israeli occupation of Gaza". The Fatah comments came in response to criticism by Hamas and its allies over Abbas' appointment of Mohammed Mustafa as the new Palestinian Authority prime minister following the resignation of Mohammed Shtayyeh.

On May 16, 2024, Mahmoud Abbas said that Hamas's unilateral military action on October 7 provided Israel with justification for attacks in the Gaza Strip. He emphasized opposition to harming civilians. In response, Hamas expressed regret for the remarks, asserting that the attack elevated the Palestinian cause and yielded strategic gains.

==== Palestinian public opinion ====
In November 2023, as a result of Israeli actions in Gaza following the October 7 attacks, Hamas's popularity among Palestinians in Gaza and the West Bank increased significantly. In a survey conducted on November 14 by the Arab World for Research and Development (AWRAD), Palestinians showed overwhelming support for the attack. It said, "Palestinians living in the West Bank overwhelmingly answered that they supported the attack to either an extreme or 'somewhat' extent (83.1%)." In Gaza, Palestinians exhibited lesser consensus, with only 63.6% "extremely" or "somewhat" supporting the attack. 14.4% answered they neither opposed or supported the attack, and 20.9% opposed the attack to some degree.

By 2024, support for the attacks had significantly dropped. According to a poll published in September by the Palestinian Center for Policy and Survey Research (PSR), 57% of respondents in the Gaza Strip said the decision to launch the offensive was incorrect, while 39% said it was correct. In the West Bank, most still considered the attacks justified despite a decline in support.

=== Israeli response ===
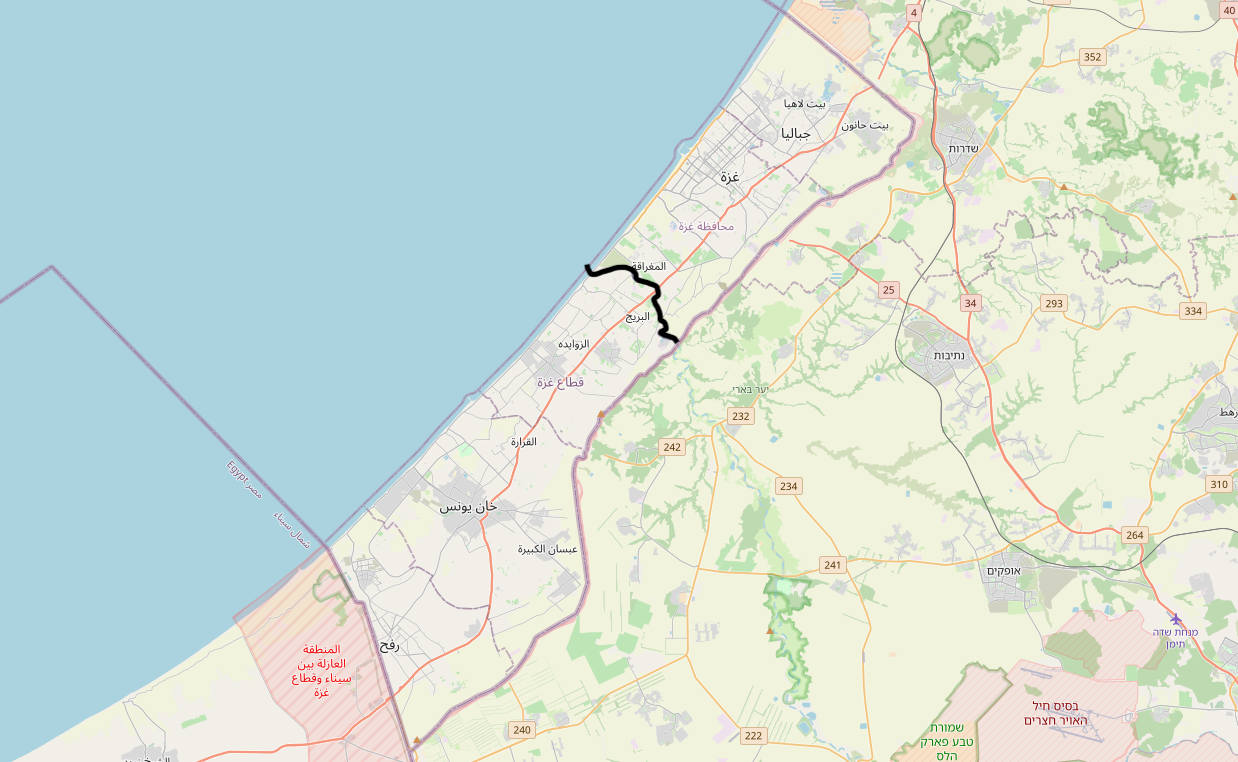
The line in black represents the IDF's boundary at Wadi Gaza for evacuation of the northern Gaza Strip.

Israel said that Hamas "made a grave mistake" in launching its attack and pledged that "Israel will win". The IDF declared a "state of readiness for war", adding that reservists were to be deployed not only in Gaza but also in the West Bank and along the borders with Lebanon and Syria. Residents in areas near Gaza were asked to stay inside, while civilians in southern and central Israel were "required to stay next to shelters". Roads around Gaza were closed by the IDF. Tel Aviv's streets were also locked down.

After the attack, Israel declared a heightened state of preparedness for conflict. The IDF declared a state of readiness for war, and Netanyahu convened an emergency gathering of security authorities. Israeli Police Commissioner Kobi Shabtai announced that a "state of war" existed, following what he called "a massive attack from the Gaza Strip". He also announced the closure of all of southern Israel to "civilian movement" and the Yamam counterterrorism unit's deployment to the area. The IDF's chief spokesperson, Rear Admiral Daniel Hagari, said four divisions were deployed to the area, augmenting 31 preexisting battalions.

Israeli President Isaac Herzog said the country was facing "a very difficult moment", and offered strength and encouragement to the IDF, other security forces, rescue services, and residents who were under attack.

Ben Gurion Airport and Ramon Airport remained operational, but multiple airlines canceled flights. Israel Railways suspended service in parts of the country and replaced some routes with temporary bus routes, and cruise ships removed the ports of Ashdod and Haifa from their itineraries.

==== Military response ====
The Hamas attack marked the beginning of the ongoing Gaza War. Israel began intense bombing of Gaza and enacted a total blockade of Gaza on October 9. The government formed a war cabinet on October 11. The Israeli military launched an invasion of Gaza on October 27. Leaders of both Israel and Hamas would be indicted by the International Criminal Court on accusations of war crimes or crimes against humanity for their conduct during the conflict.

==== Capture and interrogation of militants ====
Following the attack, more than 600 militants were captured in Israel. Israel has claimed the interrogation of suspects revealed significant insights into the group's strategies, ideologies, and operational methods that played a crucial role in its military response and in shaping the global understanding of the conflict. Israel's aim was to support its narrative and counter Hamas narratives.

However, a number of sources have questioned whether Israel forced Palestinians to make confessions. Some of the militants in the videos appear to be bloodied and in pain. On November 14, AP News analyzed that a confession video Israel released showed the captured militant was speaking "clearly under duress". Palestinians detainees released after October 7 have reported that Israeli authorities ordered them to make statements, beat them severely, and sometimes demanded that they make statements with a gun pointed to their face. The UN and reports by human rights organizations such as B'Tselem and media outlets have confirmed Israeli systematic use of torture during the Gaza War, including rape, gang-rape, sexualized torture and mutilation of detained Palestinian men, women and children by Israeli guards, including during interrogations.

Human Rights Watch and Amnesty International stated that taped alleged confessions released by the Israeli military were likely extracted under torture, violate international law and basic human rights, and should be considered inadmissible as credible evidence. They also called on the Israeli government to cease publishing such taped "confessions". Physicians for Human Rights Israel also denounced alleged taped confessions, citing "severe concern that the interrogations included the use of torture."

==== Special tribunal ====
In May 2026, the Knesset passed a bill approving the establishment of a special military tribunal to prosecute participants in the October 7 attacks. Initially proposed in November 2024, the bill was revised significantly before its passage. The court was originally conceived as an independent body with judges drawn from the international community, but was ultimately established as a military court comprised exclusively of former Israeli judges and military officers. The tribunal was granted jurisdiction to try defendants for genocide, terrorism, "causing war", "harming Israeli sovereignty", and assisting an enemy in times of war. It will have the power to impose the death penalty under existing statutes. Simcha Rothman, one of the bill's co-sponsors, predicted that the tribunal would be ready to deliver verdicts "within three to five years".

Tribunal proceedings will be broadcast live and heard by a panel of judges rather than a jury, drawing comparisons with the Eichmann trial in 1961. In addition to crimes committed on October 7, the tribunal will have jurisdiction to try people suspected of holding Israeli citizens hostage in Gaza or abusing them in captivity.

Israel's proposals for the tribunal were widely criticised, including by the International Bar Association and several human rights organisations, who criticised the legal framework underpinning the court. UN High Commissioner for Human Rights Volker Türk called for the law establishing the tribunal to be repealed, arguing that it did not afford sufficient due process rights to Palestinian defendants and "allows further erosion of fair trial guarantees through its introduction of mass trials, which undermine the presumption of innocence by their premise of collective guilt rather than evidence of an individual’s criminal acts".

==== Arab Israelis ====
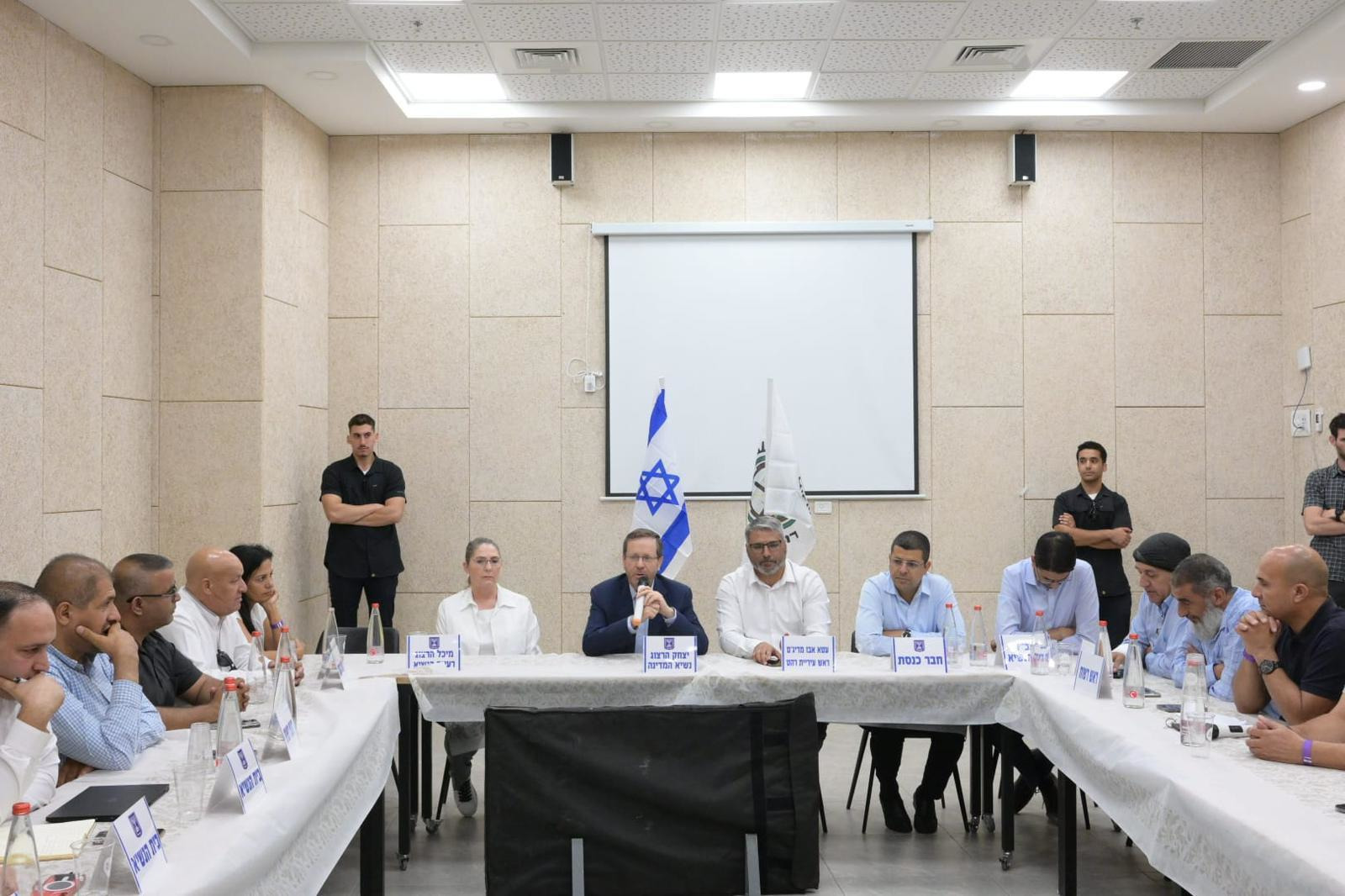
Israeli President Isaac Herzog in the city of Rahat with the heads of the Bedouin community and the families of kidnapped and murdered Bedouins, October 26, 2023

Arab Israeli politicians, including the United Arab List leader Mansour Abbas and Arab Knesset member Ayman Odeh, condemned the Hamas-led attack on Israel. Israel's Social Equality Minister Amichai Chikli said, "the Arab population has shown much solidarity and responsibility, and this is especially true for the Bedouin population in the Negev."

=== International ===
Countries that condemned the October 7 attacks as a terrorist attack

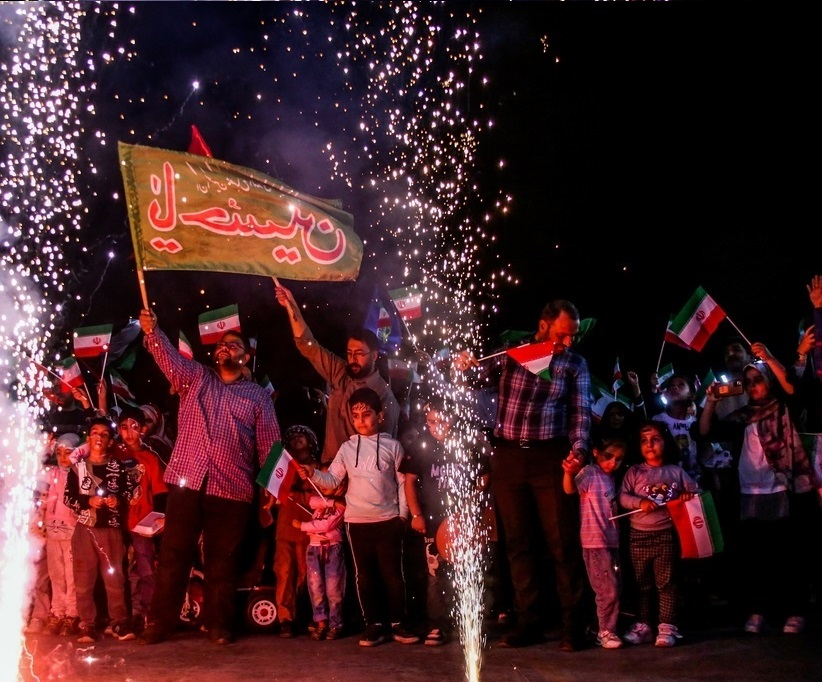
Celebrations in Iran, October 7, 2023

At least 44 nations denounced Hamas and explicitly condemned its conduct as terrorism, with the denunciations including a joint statement by the United States, the United Kingdom, France, Italy, and Germany. In contrast, Arab and Muslim countries including Qatar, Saudi Arabia, Kuwait, Syria, Iran and Iraq blamed Israel's policy of occupying the Palestinians for the attack. The UAE, Bahrain, and China have amended their initial declarations to expressly denounce the killing and abduction of Israeli civilians. According to a poll conducted by The Washington Institute for Near East Policy between November 14 and December 6, 2023, 95% of Saudis did not believe that Hamas had killed civilians in its attack on Israel.

Over 680 legal experts and 128 human rights experts from Israel and around the world have signed an appeal for the immediate release of all hostages kidnapped by Hamas, and for the end of the "vicious and inhumane capture, violence, torture and other cruel, inhuman or degrading treatment of women and girls, children and infants." According to the appeal, "the abductees are defined according to international law as victims of enforced disappearance... [which makes these acts] blatant violations of international human rights law and humanitarian law, amounting to war crimes and crimes against humanity."

The United Nations, particularly the United Nations Committee on the Elimination of Discrimination against Women (CEDAW), faced criticism for failing to condemn Hamas's actions against women and failing to voice disapproval of reports of sexual and gender-based violence against Israeli women and girls.

In response Sarah Hendrik, an official from UN Women, one of the UN agencies subject to these criticisms, stated that "within the UN family, these investigations are led by the Office of the High Commission for Human Rights", and that her agency did not have the legal competence to determine culpability. Azadeh Moaveni reported that claims of double standards or lack of condemnation by UN Women were incorrect, as:

UN Women has not inveighed against conflict-related sexual violence in Yemen, Afghanistan, Somalia, Libya, Colombia or Mali, and its condemnations of rape in the DRC, Central African Republic, Syria and Iraq came years after the events themselves. Where it has responded more swiftly (and then only within months), it has done so in places where the UN had teams on the ground investigating and documenting abuses, or as a result of UN-wide appeals. UN Women has never named a specific group or perpetrator. According to its own protocols, it has been vociferous in responding to October 7 – as many as eight times in the first two months – through statements, social media posts and session remarks.

Moaveni also notes that what was demanded of UN Women was to go beyond its mandate and name in an unprecedented way before a proper investigation by the mandated UN bodies had been carried out, and that if it had done so it would have significantly damaged its relationships with grassroots women's groups.

The US House of Representatives overwhelmingly passed a bill to amend the US immigration code and ban people associated with Hamas, PIJ, and other perpetrators of the October 7 attacks from seeking immigration-related relief or protections in the United States. The U.S. Department of Justice filed charges in absentia against six Hamas leaders for their involvement in the attacks.

After the attacks, the Shoah Foundation said it had gathered over 100 video testimonies of those who experienced the attacks to add them to the collection of "Holocaust survivor and witness testimony." Shoah Foundation founder Steven Spielberg said of the attacks, "I never imagined I would see such unspeakable barbarity against Jews in my lifetime" and that the Shoah Foundation project would ensure "that their stories would be recorded and shared in the effort to preserve history and to work toward a world without antisemitism or hate of any kind."

On May 20, 2024, the Prosecutor of the International Criminal Court requested arrest warrants against Haniyeh, Deif and Yahya Sinwar for crimes committed during the October 7 attacks, as part of the court's ongoing investigation in Palestine. On November 21, an arrest warrant was issued for Deif accusing him of crimes including murder, sexual violence, torture, hostage taking, extermination and cruel treatment of the civilian population. (Note: Cases against Haniyeh and Sinwar were discontinued, as both had been killed by this date.) The charges against Deif were dropped in February 2025 after ICC prosecutors confirmed he had been killed in an airstrike.

In March 2025, United States Attorney General Pam Bondi announced the establishment of the Joint Task Force October 7 (JTF 10-7) to seek justice for victims of the October 7 attacks. The task force focuses on prosecuting the direct perpetrators of the attack, pursuing charges against senior Hamas leaders, and targeting individuals and entities providing support or financing to Hamas, Iranian-linked proxy groups, and affiliates. It also addresses acts of antisemitism linked to these groups. JTF 10-7 is led by senior officials from the Justice Department's National Security Division and the Federal Bureau of Investigation, with personnel drawn from multiple DOJ divisions, the FBI, and international partners, including Israel's National Bureau of Counter Terror Finance.

== In culture ==
One Day in October is a seven-episode anthology drama television series based on personal stories from the attacks. It premiered on Yes Drama in Israel on October 7, 2024.

Red Alert, another television series based on the attacks, premiered in Israel on October 5, 2025 and internationally via Paramount+ on October 7.

== See also ==
- List of major terrorist incidents
- List of massacres in Israel
- Outline of the Gaza war
- Timeline of the Gaza war
- Displacement of Israelis after the October 7 attacks
