= Jayar Davidov =

Israeli police officer (died 2023)

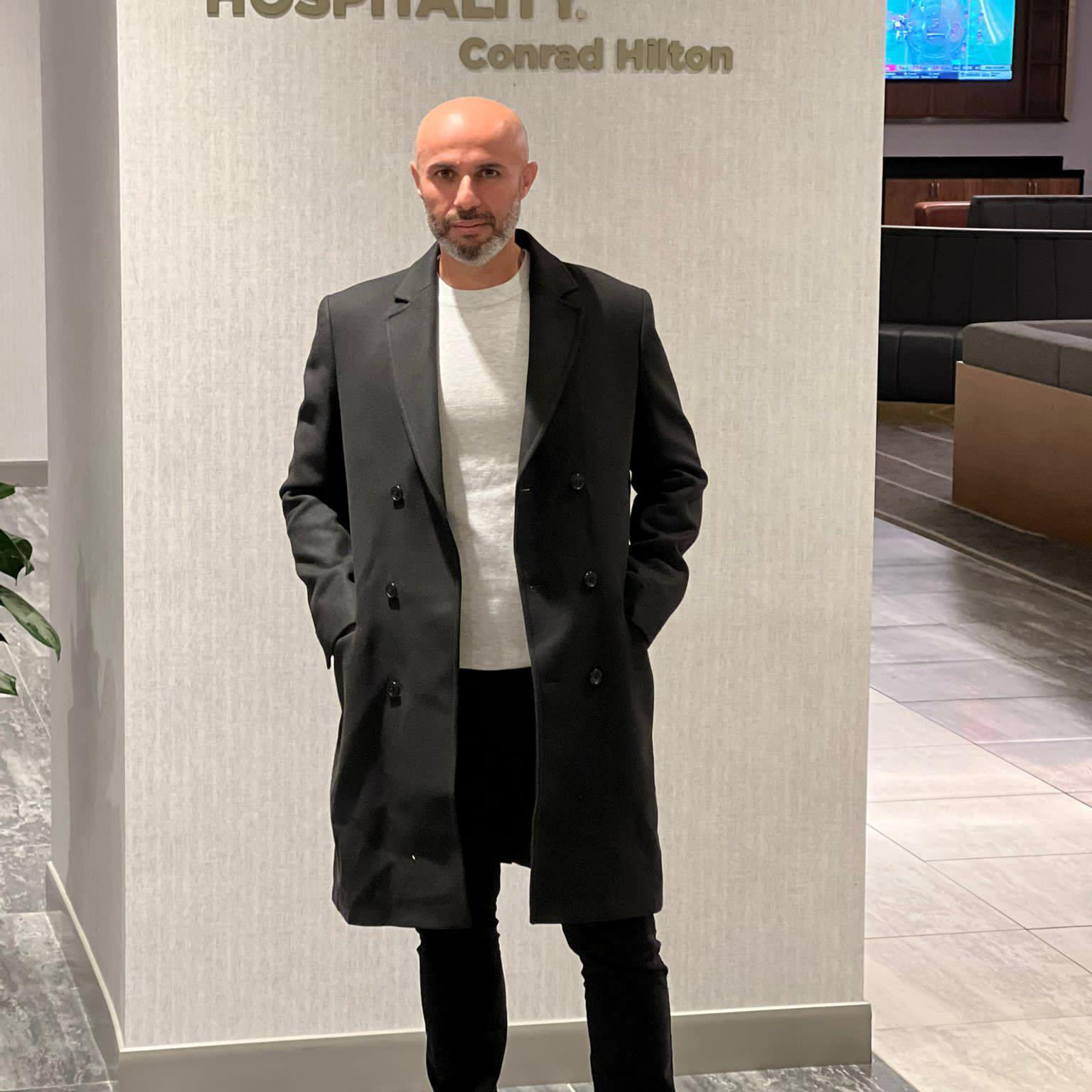
- Davidov in 2022
- Born: 8 October 1979; Azerbaijan SSR, Soviet Union
- Died: 7 October 2023 (aged 43) †; Re'im, Israel
- Military career
- Allegiance: Israel
- Branch: Israeli Police
- Service years: 2001–2023
- Rank: Chief Superintendent
- Commands: Ramat HaNegev Regional Council police station Lakhish District police brigade Rahat police station
- Conflicts: October 7 attacks †

Jayar Davidov (Hebrew: ג'יי אר דוידוב; 8 October 1979 – 7 October 2023) was an Israeli police officer who was a police commander in Rahat and a Chief Superintendent in the Israel Police. Davidov was killed in the line of duty during the October 7 attacks.

== Early life ==
Davidov was born on 8 October 1979 in Azerbaijan SSR, Soviet Union. In 1980, he immigrated with his family to Israel.

== Career ==
Davidov began his service as an officer with the Israel Border Police and later served as head of the police station in Ramat Negev and as Intelligence Officer in Be'er Sheva.

In 2019, he was appointed commander of the Central Unit of Lakhish, one of the three units comprising the South District. Within the scope of the region were the top organized crime syndicates, including numerous mafia organizations originating from Russia, Georgia and the Caucasus, as well as local Israeli crime bosses. With dozens of indictments against high-profile felons and their physical removal from the region, he was "the terror of organized crime in Israel". In 2021, the Central Unit under his command was awarded a citation of excellence by the Police Commissioner. In December 2022, he assumed position as chief of police in the city Rahat, the only municipality in Israel of the Bedouin community with the status of a city.

== Death ==
On 7 October 2023, he was killed along with three of his officers in a shoot-out with Palestinian militants in the vicinity of Ofakim during the outbreak of the Gaza war. At the time of his death, he was designated to lead the founding of a new Central Unit for the entire South District. At the time of his death, Davidov was a Chief Superintendent.
