= Kugelblitz =

Kugelblitz (German for "ball lightning") may refer to:

- Kugelblitz (armoured fighting vehicle), a German self-propelled anti-aircraft gun used in World War II
- Kugelblitz (astrophysics), a concentration of light so intense that it forms an event horizon and becomes self-trapped
- Operation Kugelblitz, a 1943 anti-Partisan offensive in Yugoslavia
- Aílton (footballer, born 1973), nickname for athlete Aílton Gonçalves da Silva
