= Chen Kugel =

Israeli forensic pathologist

- חן קוגל
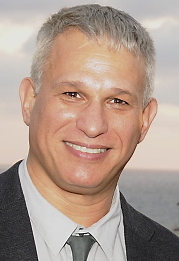
- Kugel in 2015
- Born: חן קוגל; 14 May 1962; Holon, Israel
- Occupation: Pathologist

Chen Kugel (Hebrew: חן קוגל; born 14 May 1962) is an Israeli forensic pathologist, and chief pathologist of the Abu Kabir Forensic Institute.

== Early life ==
Kugel was born on 14 May 1962 in Holon, the son of Jehuda and Riwka (née Roiter) Kugel, and the grandson of a former mayor of Holon, Chaim Kugel.

== Education and work ==
Kugel graduated as a Doctor of Medicine from the Ben Gurion University in 1986. Between 1988 and 1992, he worked in various positions as a medical doctor in the Israeli military forces, while from 1992 to 1999 he worked in forensic medicine. In 2012 he was appointed chief pathologist at the Abu Kabir Forensic Institute.

As head of the Forensic Institute, Kugel oversaw the investigation of bodies from the 7 October attacks, and was interviewed for various media outlets to discuss his findings. For this work he was awarded the Israel Prize in March 2024.

On 18 October 2024, following Yahya Sinwar's killing by the Israel Defense Forces, Kugel conducted an autopsy on Sinwar's body. He concluded that Sinwar died from a gunshot wound to the head, causing severe traumatic brain injury.

== Tom Hurndall ==
In the case of the killing of Tom Hurndall by Israeli soldier Taysir Hayb, the defence attempted to raise doubts as to what ultimately caused Hurndall's death. A military court was informed that Hurndall died of pneumonia. Chen Kugel, appearing for the defence, stated that the pneumonia had not been properly treated and "the large amounts of morphine" Hurndall was receiving contributed to his death. The court rejected these claims.

== Gaza war and claims of beheaded babies ==
During the Gaza war, Kugel in his role as Israel's chief forensic pathologist overseeing the investigation of 7 October bodies told The Economist that he had "seen the burnt, headless bodies of babies, although he could not say for certain whether they had been beheaded."

In a piece in The Media Line focused on his work, Kugel again claimed that many of the bodies, including those of babies, were without heads. When asked if these had been decapitated, Kugel answered yes. He added that it was difficult to determine whether they had been decapitated before or after death, or whether their heads had been "cut off by knife or blown off by RPG".

However Haaretz, citing sources including Israel's National Insurance Institute, kibbutz leaders and the police, reported that one baby was killed on 7 October; hit by a bullet when militants fired at the door of a family's safe room in kibbutz Be'eri. Haaretz concluded that any claims of beheaded babies were false. In a detailed investigation Le Monde also concluded claims of beheaded babies were false.

== See also ==
- Ziad Abu Ein Autopsy
- Hamas baby beheading hoax
- Forensics of the October 7 attacks
