= Abu Kabir Forensic Institute =

Israeli forensic research laboratory

Coordinates: 32.04475°N 34.7689°E

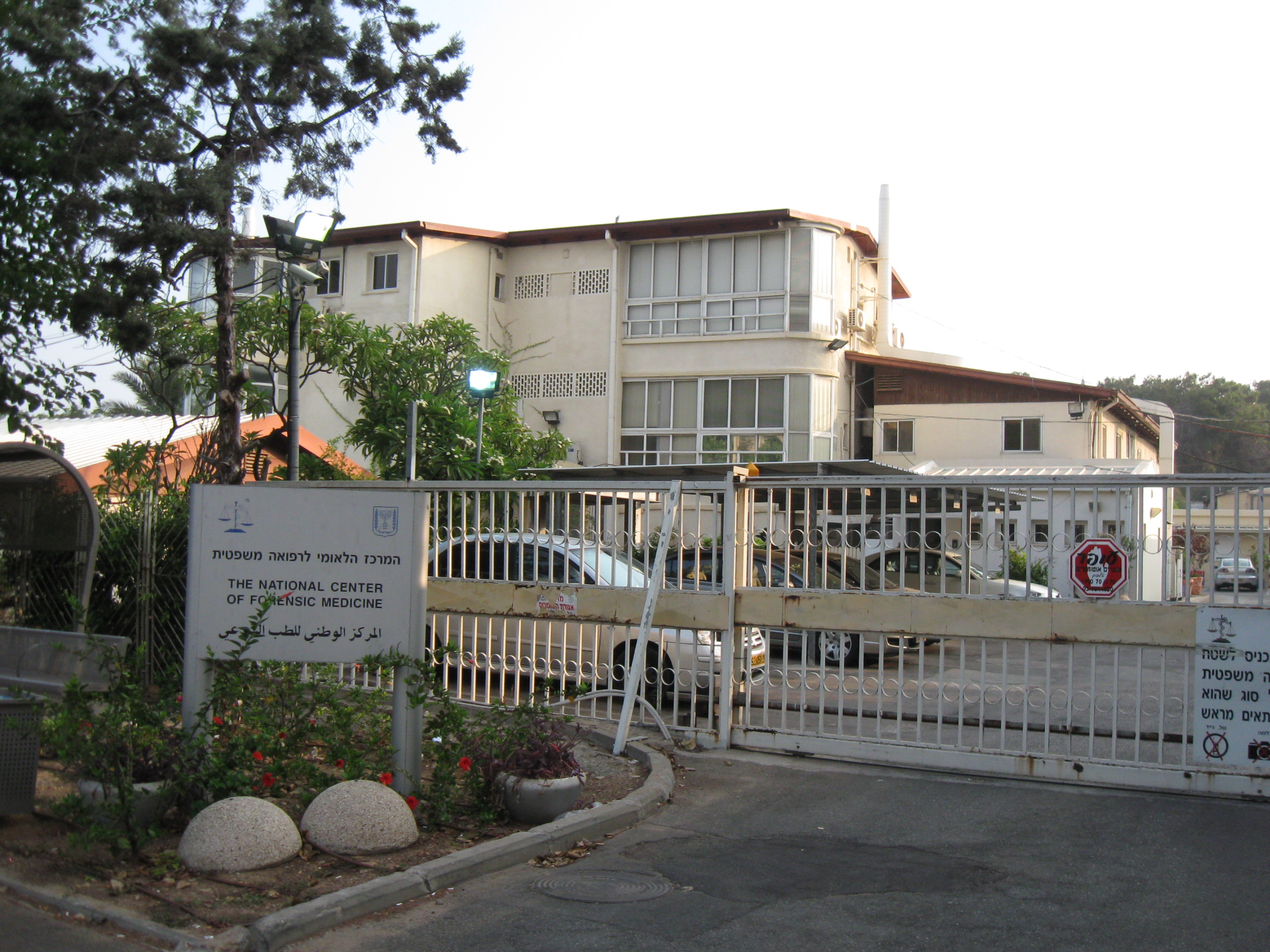
Abu Kabir Forensic Institute

The L. Greenberg National Institute of Forensic Medicine (Hebrew: המכון הלאומי לרפואה משפטית ע"ש ל' גרינברג; also known as the Abu Kabir Forensic Institute or simply Abu Kabir) is an Israeli forensic research laboratory located in the Abu Kabir neighborhood of Tel Aviv, Israel.

The Abu Kabir Institute is the only facility in Israel authorized to conduct autopsies in cases of unnatural death. The lab at Abu Kabir conducts forensic examination in cases of rape, homicide, suicide and suspicious death. It also identifies victims of political attacks.

== Name ==
The institute is variously called National Center of Forensic Medicine, L. Greenberg National Institute of Forensic Medicine or Abu Kabir Forensic Institute (which is shortened to Abu Kabir).

== History ==
Established in 1954 as part of the Israel Police Division of Criminal Identification (today the Division of Identification & Forensic Science), the institute was opened in June 1955, thanks to a donation from the Jewish Federation in South Africa in honor of Judge Leopold Greenberg. In November 1955, when its opening was announced in an official ceremony, responsibility was transferred to the Hebrew University in Jerusalem. In 1975 the institute was transferred to the responsibility of the Israeli Ministry of Health, in 1988 it was affiliated to the Sackler Faculty of Medicine at Tel Aviv University, and in 2004 it was transferred to the administrative management of the Assaf Harofeh Medical Center. In 2012 it was decided to transfer it to the management of the medical administration at the Ministry of Health.

== Duties ==
Workers at the institute perform about 2,000 autopsies annually. The family's consent or a court order is required for the examination. The facility also undertakes about 600 tests a year on living people in connection with criminal investigations. The main areas of research at the institute include sudden and unexpected infant death, alternative methods for examining bodies, identification of remains, domestic violence and war and gunshot wounds. In addition, the institute collects and processes genetic data regarding the Israeli population while comparing the Arab and Jewish populations.

The Department of Forensic Biology operating at the institute deals with the identification, based on genetic and other characteristics, of corpses that cannot be identified due to their mutilation (for example, as a result of an attack or due to a long period of time between death and until the body was found). The department also assists in solving serious crimes using biological evidence (such as DNA identification). The anthropological laboratory operating at the institute deals with legal anthropology. The institute is the only recognized institution in Israel to specialize in forensic medicine.

== Controversies ==
=== Organ removal allegations ===
In 2005, the then chief pathologist Yehuda Hiss, director of Abu Kabir from 1988 to 2004, admitted, as part of a plea bargain, to the unauthorized removal of organs, bone and tissue from 125 bodies in the 1990s. Israel said that such activity stopped in 2000.

In 2009, Abu Kabir was mentioned in a controversial article in Swedish tabloid Aftonbladet by Donald Boström. Boström accused the institute of being part of a human organ trafficking ring in which Israel Defense Forces (IDF) soldiers abducted Palestinians to "harvest" their organs.

Boström later admitted having no evidence. "I have a personal opinion," Boström told Israel Radio. "It concerns me to the extent that I want it to be investigated. But whether it's true or not—I have no idea, I have no clue." In an interview with an Israeli newspaper, Boström said his allegations were based on hearsay: "What I experienced during this day is many people from Israel who called me haven't read the article. So they think I'm accusing the IDF of stealing organs. That's not what I'm doing. I just recorded the Palestinian families saying that."

The Israeli Ministry of Health later acknowledged that "skin, corneas, heart valves and bones" had been removed during autopsies of Israelis, including IDF soldiers, Palestinians and foreign workers in the 1990s. The ministry says that for the past decade, procedures carried out at Abu Kabir have conformed with ethics and Jewish law, and all organ removal is done with permission. However there are documented reports that staff at Abu Kabir harvested skin, corneas, heart valves and bones from the bodies of Israeli soldiers, Israeli citizens, Palestinians and foreign workers, without permission from relatives.

Nancy Scheper-Hughes, a professor of anthropology at the University of California, Berkeley who founded Organs Watch, an organization that monitors traffic in human organs, said she decided to publicize an interview with Hiss in the wake of the Aftonbladet affair. She described the involvement of the IDF as a "widely-known secret in Israel." However, Scheper-Hughes made it clear she does not believe Israel murdered Palestinians for organs.

The Attorney General of Israel dropped criminal charges against Hiss. He was fired in 2012 and replaced by Dr. Chen Kugel.

=== Allegations of falsification of forensic evidence ===
In December 2015, Dr. Maya Forman-Resnick, a forensic pathologist, gave an interview to the investigative program Uvda ("Fact"), where she repeated her previous accusation of the institute of falsifying scientific data and altering pathology reports to support the prosecution in criminal cases.

Dr. Chen Kugel, the head of the institute, also stated that the State Prosecutor's Office pressures the institute to change its findings when they are not aligned with its interests, and that he had changed reports under pressure. He added, "Only in a totalitarian country does the state seek to turn the forensic institute into a rubber stamp for the prosecution's caprices."

=== Gaza war and false claims of beheaded babies ===
During the Gaza war, Kugel in his role as Israel's chief forensic pathologist overseeing the investigation of 7 October bodies told The Economist that he had "seen the burnt, headless bodies of babies, although he could not say for certain whether they had been beheaded."

In a piece in The Media Line focused on his work, Kugel again claimed that many of the bodies, including those of babies, were without heads. When asked if these had been decapitated, Kugel answered yes. He added that it was difficult to determine whether they had been decapitated before or after death, or whether their heads had been "cut off by knife or blown off by RPG".

However Haaretz, citing sources including Israel's National Insurance Institute, kibbutz leaders and the police, reported that one baby was killed on 7 October; hit by a bullet when militants fired at the door of a family's safe room in kibbutz Be'eri. Haaretz concluded that any claims of beheaded babies were false. In a detailed investigation Le Monde also concluded claims of beheaded babies were false.

== See also ==
- Hamas baby beheading hoax
- Forensic Identification of the October 7 victims
