= Subterranean warfare =

Warfare conducted underground

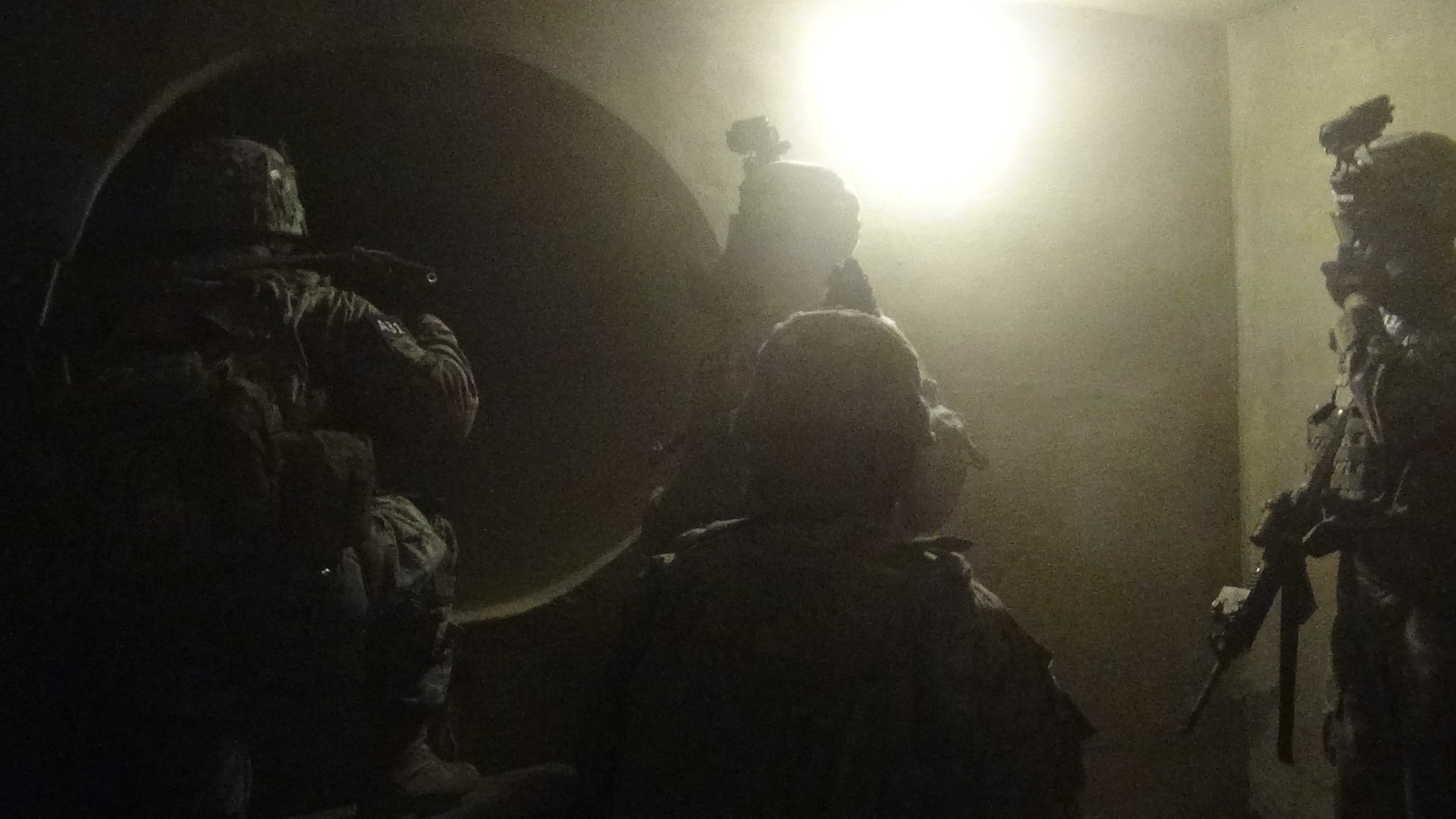
United States Army soldiers training for subterranean warfare in 2013

Subterranean warfare or underground warfare is warfare conducted underneath the ground surface. It is predominantly conducted in tunnels and underground cavities, both natural (such as caves) and artificial (such as sewerage and subway systems).

Underground military facilities play a key role in many nations, and there are more than 10,000 underground military facilities worldwide. As such, underground warfare is a nearly inevitable component of modern conflicts.

Combatants often go underground to counteract overmatch such as that faced when taking on a superpower. Underground environments generally protect from surface attacks and aerial attacks such as airstrikes and artillery barrages, and are also generally dark, enclosed, and well-protected, making them difficult for even experienced forces to effectively fight in.

== History ==
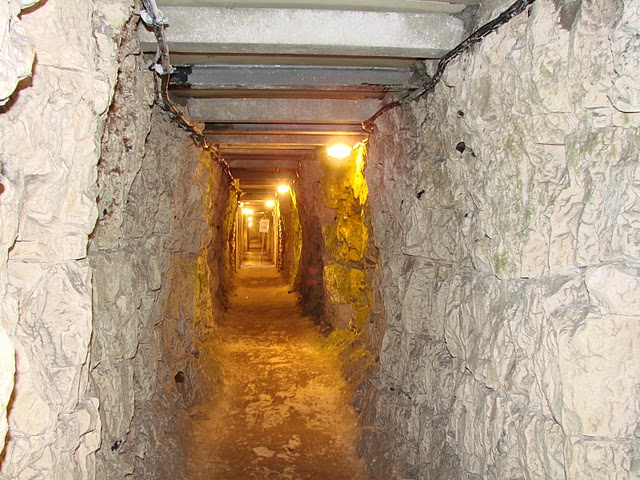
A Canadian underground tunnel in Vimy Sector from World War I

Subterranean warfare was occasionally carried out during World War II. Examples are the defense of the Adzhimushkay quarry, or the use of the Odessa Catacombs during guerilla warfare by Soviet partisans.

In 21st century the issue of readiness to subterranean warfare was raised before the U.S. military in view of Palestinian tunnel warfare in the Gaza Strip. A December 11, 2013 request for information entitled "Technologies to enhance warfighter capabilities in subterranean environments" states in part:

In an effort to defeat United States (US) intelligence and weapons technologies and to gain tactical and operational advantages both Military and irregular threats have begun relocating, and redeploying functions into subterranean operational environments (SbT OE). The growing use of tunnels and underground facilities (UGF) by military and irregular forces to gain a tactical advantage is becoming more sophisticated and increasingly effective, making the likelihood of US Forces encountering military-purposed subterranean structures on future battlefields high. The Middle East is full of ancient and modern underground systems that can be used as assets for the enemy forces. In the US, both the northern and southern borders of the nation have had tunnels discovered connecting the US to Canada and Mexico being used by criminal elements for human smuggling, drug running, and other illegal activities.

Director Robert Ashley of the Defense Intelligence Agency stated in 2018 that the United States Department of Defense is considering making "underground" a new domain, in anticipation of a future increase in urban warfare.

=== Gaza war ===
Yehuda Kfir, who formerly led the underground warfare group in the Israel Defense Forces' Technological and Logistics Directorate, described Israel's main strategy to destroy Hamas' extensive tunnel and underground facility network as "destroying infrastructure and buildings above ground in order to get to what’s underneath." Israel's techniques for destroying and/or sealing underground infrastructure included the use of sponge bombs, air strikes including the use of bunker buster munitions, and flooding them with seawater.

Daphne Richemond-Barak, the author of Underground Warfare, wrote in Foreign Policy magazine: "Never in the history of tunnel warfare has a defender been able to spend months in such confined spaces. The digging itself, the innovative ways Hamas has made use of the tunnels and the group’s survival underground for this long have been unprecedented." A 2024 Royal United Services Institute report notes that Hamas utilizes two distinct types of tunnels: deep, sophisticated ones for senior leaders and shallower variants for lower-level operatives. The IDF initially focused on securing territory before undertaking tunnel inspections, a strategy that inadvertently allowed Hamas to stage underground ambushes. Based on interviews with Israeli commanders, the report concluded that effective counter-tunnel operations require integrated surface and subterranean combat strategies while mitigating the risk of friendly fire.

== See also ==
- Military engineering
- Trench warfare
- Tunnel warfare
- Underground construction
