= Battle of Nir Am =

2023 battle in Nir Am, Israel

- Part of Gaza war
Location	Israel, Nir Am kibbutz 31°31′10″N 34°34′51″E

Belligerents
Hamas; Other Palestinian militants	Israel

Commanders and leaders
	(Israel) Yoni Cohen (Israel) Guy Hayon (Israel) Inbal Rabin-Lieberman

Casualties and losses
65 killed	2 killed, 1 abducted
- Location within Northwest Negev region of Israel Nir am (Israel)

The Battle of Nir Am occurred during the October 7 attacks in Israel, in which militants from Hamas attacked kibbutz Nir Am next to Sderot. The forces of the Golani Brigade and later the Border Guard prevented the militants from penetrating the kibbutz.

== Background ==
On the morning of October 7, 2023, Palestinian militants led by Hamas began an attack on Israel. At least 4,300 rockets were launched at Israel, and approximately 6,000 militants from the Gaza Strip broke through the Gaza–Israel barrier and infiltrated dozens of Israeli settlements and military installations in the Gaza envelope. An estimated 1,195 people were killed in the attacks, and 251 people were abducted to the Gaza Strip. Approximately 1,609 Palestinian militants were also killed.

== Battle ==
At least 65 militants attempted to infiltrate kibbutz Nir Am. The kibbutz's security coordinator, Inbal Rabin-Lieberman, instructed an alert squad to prepare for a battle. She placed ambushes around the kibbutz fence, and recruited additional armed men to reinforce the alert squad. Due to rocket fire, the electricity in Nir Am was cut off, and Lieberman ordered the kibbutz's generator not to be turned on to prevent the opening the kibbutz gates.

Company A of the 13th Battalion of the Golani Brigade, commanded by Major Yoni Cohen, was deployed to defend the kibbutz. The battle began at 6:30 a.m. and lasted about eighteen hours. During the battle, three forces under Yoni's command fought to prevent the militants from reaching the gates. The militants managed to reach the hatchery west of the kibbutz but were stopped by a vehicle checkpoint and an ambush.

A tank from Battalion 77, commanded by Lieutenant Guy Hayon, took part in the battle. Although the tank was hit by anti-tank fire, the tank and its crew continued the fighting.

Two militants who were able to get past the roadblock began running through a plowed field toward the kibbutz. The alert squad and Golani soldiers shot and killed them. One Israeli citizen, Samer Talalka, was taken hostage and was later mistakenly killed by the IDF.

During the battle, Corporal Matan Abergil was killed after jumping on a grenade to save the lives of six soldiers with him. Later, soldiers from the Border Guard Tactical Brigade were deployed to the kibbutz. They arrived at the kibbutz at 11:15 and continued west toward the hatchery. The tactical unit beat back the remaining militants, killing some of them.

== See also ==
- Timeline of the Gaza war (17 October – 26 November 2024)
