= Tunnel warfare in the Gaza Strip =

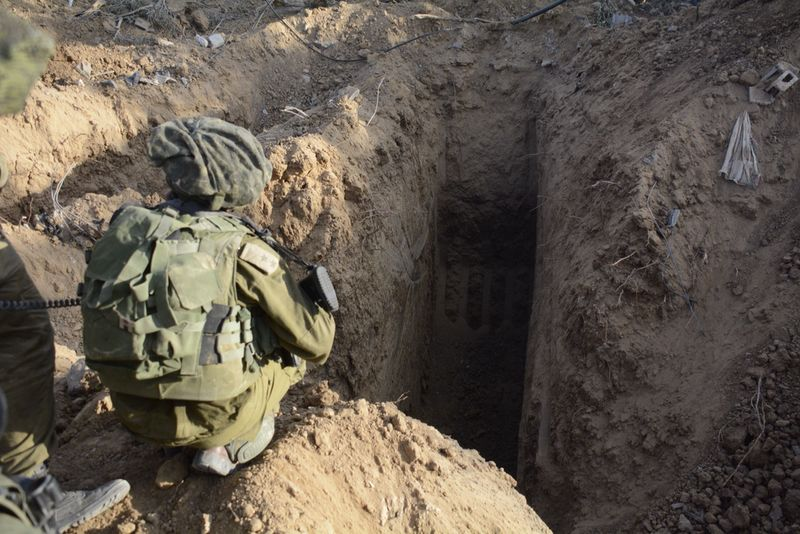
An Israeli soldier overlooking an uncovered Palestinian tunnel in the Gaza Strip during 2014 Gaza War

A vast network of underground tunnels used for warfare and to avoid Israeli airstrikes exists in the Gaza Strip. This infrastructure runs throughout the Gaza Strip and towards Egypt and Israel, and has been developed by Hamas and other Palestinian military organizations to facilitate the storing and shielding of weapons; the gathering and moving of fighters, including for training and communication purposes; the launching of offensive attacks against Israel; and the transportation of Israeli hostages. On several occasions, Palestinian militants have also used this tunnel network, which is colloquially referred to as the Gaza metro,‌ to infiltrate Israel and Egypt while masking their presence and activities within the Gaza Strip itself. According to Iranian military officer Hassan Hassanzadeh, who commanded the Islamic Revolutionary Guard Corps from Tehran, the Gaza Strip's tunnels run for more than 500 kilometres (310 mi) throughout the territory.

== Size and dimensions ==
The total size and dimensions of the Palestinian tunnel network in the Gaza Strip is unknown, with all parties involved keeping the details classified. In 2016, Ismail Haniyeh, the former prime minister of the Palestinian National Authority and later Chairman of the Hamas Government, indicated that the tunnel network was double the size of the Củ Chi tunnels, which were developed by the Viet Cong during the Vietnam War. Citing a private briefing in February 2015, Daniel Rubinstein wrote that Israel discovered 100 kilometres (62 mi) of tunnels during the 2014 Gaza War, one-third of which intruded upon Israeli territory; Ynet's Alex Fishman reported the same figure in 2017. Haaretz reporter Yaniv Kubovich reported in June 2021 that Hamas had constructed "hundreds of kilometers of tunnels the length and breadth of the Gaza Strip" after some of them were damaged during Operation Guardian of the Walls.

Animation by the Israel Defense Forces depicting an aspect of the Gazan tunnel network used primarily by Hamas, 2021

The tunnel system runs beneath many Gazan towns and cities, such as Khan Yunis, Jabalia and the Shati refugee camp. Typically, tunnel access points are hidden inside buildings, such as private homes or mosques, or camouflaged by brush, which impedes their detection via aerial imaging or drones. According to Eyal Weizman, "most tunnels have several access points and routes, starting in several homes or in chicken coops, joining together into a main route, and then branching off again into several separate passages leading into buildings on the other side." During the 2014 Gaza War the IDF encountered "complex tunnels, with a number of entry and exit shafts", and "[t]he main tunnel was often split, and sometimes there were parallel routes." The tunnels are usually 20 to 30 m (66 to 98 ft) beneath the surface. On average, each tunnel is approximately 2 m (6.6 ft) high by 1 m (3.3 ft) wide, and equipped with lights, electricity, and sometimes tracks for transporting materials. The tunnels are often booby trapped with improvised explosive devices.

An IDF engineering officer tasked with locating tunnels told Haaretz that three tunnels discovered in 2013 opened the Israelis' eyes to proportions of the network. The engineering officer described "wide tunnels, with internal communication systems that had been dug deep beneath the surface and the sides were reinforced with layers of concrete" in which "[y]ou could walk upright in them without any difficulty." An Israeli army spokesman said that the tunnel system is "like the Underground, the Metro, or the subway."

The UN Relief and Works Agency (UNRWA) for Palestine refugees reported in November 2022 that it found a tunnel underneath an elementary school operated by the agency. "The Agency protested strongly to the relevant authorities in Gaza to express outrage and condemnation of the presence of such a structure underneath one of its installations", which it complained was "a serious violation of the Agency's neutrality and a breach of international law" that "exposes children and Agency staff to significant security and safety risks." The UNRWA said in a statement that the agency had "cordoned off the area and swiftly took the necessary measures to render the school safe, including permanently sealing the cavity."

Hamas released the 85-year-old Yocheved Lifshitz on 24 October 2023, who had been taken hostage during the October 7 attacks. Lifshitz described walking for two to three hours through damp tunnels until she and other hostages reached a large hall. Lifshitz told reporters that Hamas has a "huge network" of tunnels that resembled a "spiderweb." According to Lifshitz, Hamas had prepared clean rooms with mattresses on the ground and the hostages received regular visits from doctors in their underground positions.

=== Largest tunnels ===
The largest known tunnel was discovered by the IDF on 17 December 2023, during the Gaza war. The tunnel has several branches and junctions, along with plumbing, electricity and communication lines. The largest of the branches discovered had a length of approximately four kilometers and goes down to a depth of 50 meters underground in some areas. The tunnel was wide enough for vehicles to travel inside. IDF also captured footage of the tunnel's construction which was released to the internet and showed Hamas using tunnel-boring machines. The tunnel was discovered a quarter of a mile from a border crossing, and was described by Israel as designed for "moving massive assets." In one video shown to journalists, Yahya Sinwar's brother Mohammad Sinwar is seen driving a car through what Israel described as the tunnel.

== Origins and construction ==
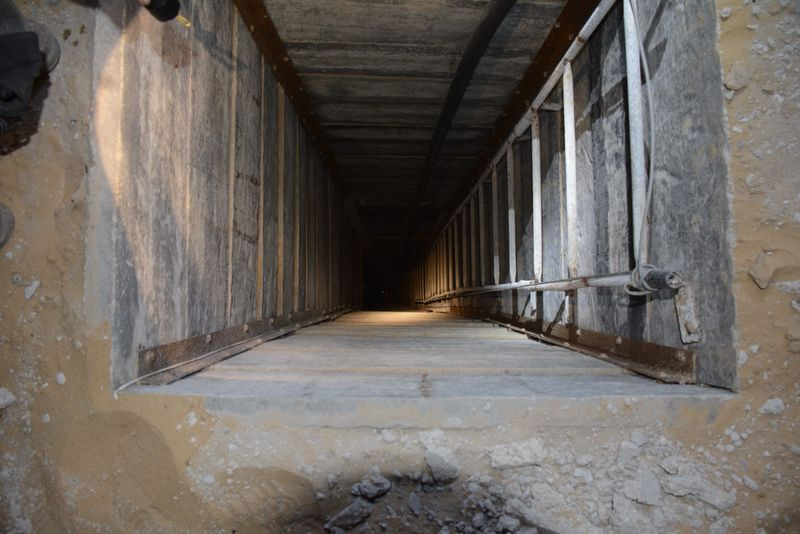
Photograph of a Palestinian tunnel shaft uncovered by the Israeli military during Operation Protective Edge, 2014

The tunnel network used for warfare purposes has its origins in the smuggling tunnels connecting the Gaza Strip to Egypt. Tunnels have connected the Egyptian and Gazan sides of Rafah since the early 1980s, when the Philadelphi Route artificially divided the city. These tunnels grew in size, sophistication, and importance as a result of the Egyptian and Israeli economic blockade in 2007.

The implementation of the tunnel network was reportedly coordinated under the direction of Mohammed Deif, leader of Al-Qassam Brigades; and before that, Ahmed Jabari, formerly the head of operations for the Brigades before being killed by the IDF.

The tunnels into Israel were constructed using the expertise of the Rafah families who have specialized in digging tunnels into Egypt for commerce and smuggling. According to Eado Hecht, an Israeli defence analyst specialising in underground warfare, "[T]hese underground complexes are fairly similar in concept to the Viet Cong tunnels dug beneath the jungles of South Vietnam, though the quality of finishing is better, with concrete walls and roofs, electricity and other required amenities for lengthy sojourn."

The Israeli military has provided estimates in 2014 that Hamas spent around $30 to $90 million, and poured 600,000 tons of concrete, in order to build three dozen tunnels. Some tunnels were estimated to have cost $3 million to construct.

The Mako network published a description of the working conditions on the tunnels, citing an unnamed Israeli informant who said he worked on them, including the following details: Workers spent 8–12 hours a day on construction under precarious conditions and received a monthly wage of $150–$300. Hamas used electric or pneumatic jackhammers for digging tunnels. Tunnels were dug 18–25 meters (59–82 ft) underground at the rate of 4–5 meters a day. Tunnels were usually dug through sandy soil requiring their roof to be supported by a more durable level of clay. Tunnels were also reinforced by concrete panels manufactured in workshops adjacent to each tunnel. As of 2014, according to Yiftah S. Shapir and Gal Perel, the cost of digging a tunnel was around $100,000 and takes about three months to build.

According to reporting from Al-Monitor, individuals digging the tunnels spend long periods underground and use a device with a pedal-powered chain, similar to a bicycle, to dig through the dirt while lying on his back and pedaling with his feet.

Construction and use of the tunnels is associated with mortal danger due to accidental detonation of explosives and tunnel collapses. Hamas reported that 22 members of its armed wing died in tunnel accidents in 2017; another militant was killed on 22 April 2018.

=== Iranian involvement ===
After the 2007 imposition of a blockade on the Gaza Strip by Israel and Egypt, the Iranian Quds Force under the longtime direction of General Qasem Soleimani was active in supporting the further construction of tunnels under Gaza and the smuggling of weapons through these tunnels to the armed wings of Hamas and the Palestinian Islamic Jihad. In 2021 senior Hamas representative to Lebanon, Ahmad Abd al-Hadi said:

The idea of [digging] tunnels... Today there are 360 kilometers of tunnels in Gaza. There are more than 360 kilometers of tunnels underground. I won't go into details on this. Two people came up with the idea of digging these tunnels: The first is the martyred commander Imad Mughniyeh, and the second is Hajj Qasem Soleimani who went to Gaza more than once and contributed to the defense plan from the moment it was first drafted. I am not divulging any secret, by the way. The enemies know all this but what the enemies do not know is way more than what they do know.

Iranian Brigadier-General Abdolfattah Ahvazian, adviser to the Commander of the Quds Force, said in November 2023 regarding Soleimani's role in the construction and proliferation of the Gaza tunnel network:

After the martyrdom of Hajj Qasem [Soleimani], the guys from Hamas showed us a movie. I watched the movie, and according to the people of Hamas there, Hajj Qasem had gone into Gaza. He said to them: 'Why are you sitting idly by?' They answered: 'Hajj, there is no way.' So he gave the order to take a Jihadi action, and dig hundreds of tunnels, crossing the [Gaza] borders. Within three years, the Palestinians have dug hundreds of tunnels, approximately 800 km-long, with pickaxes and hoes. These are not the kind of tunnels that only mice can use. These tunnels allow the passages of cars, mules with ammunition, and motorcycles. 700 kilometers with nothing but pickaxes and hoes.

Retired Islamic Revolutionary Guard Corps General Ezzatollah Zarghami admitted in November 2023 of having visited and inspected the Gaza tunnels himself along with senior Hamas members, during his active service with the Quds Force:

Fajr-3, which is a 240 mm rocket, was one of our products. Later, we made its warhead smaller and it had a range of 70 km. My first mission was to take this rocket... I say this with the utmost pride and with no fear of anyone. The Leader has already said that we were helping [Hamas]. We support the oppressed everywhere – Shiite Hezbollah as well as Sunni Hamas. These are what [Khamenei] has declared in the past. I traveled to the region as the production manager of those rockets, and I supplied them both to Hezbollah and the Palestinians. For some time, I was inside the very same tunnels that they are fighting from. Six or seven years ago, I posted about this and got the nickname 'yellow canary.' In the tunnels, I provided training about the usage and specification of the rockets. These training courses were highly successful. I saw that they had cages of singing canaries in the tunnels. I praised their commander about their acumen to have music during military work. The commander replied that the birds are not meant for singing, they are meant to be [oxygen] sensors in case the airflow is disrupted. If the airflow becomes weaker, the birds stop singing and drop dead. When the bird dies, we realize that there is a problem with airflow.

Mansour Haghighatpour, also a retired Quds Force General, stated in December 2023 that the creation of the tunnels under Gaza was an effort not only by the Palestinians but by the whole "Axis of Resistance":

The other thing I would like to point out is that the resistance axis, which planned with the Palestinians to build more than 400 kilometers of tunnels under an area of land that did not exceed 40 square kilometers, took various possible “scenarios” into consideration. These scenarios include [Israel] flooding the tunnels with water, pumping toxic gas into them, or blowing up parts of them. Therefore, the Palestinian side in the tunnels knows very well how to deal with all possible challenges.

The Shi'ite cleric Sheikh Jaffer Ladak asserted in January 2024 that Soleimani had played a major role in influencing the strategy of the Palestinian factions, turning it away from the suicide bombing attacks widely employed at the time of the Second Intifada and towards an underground warfare strategy:

Ayman Zarqawi was the one who began the idea of suicide bombings and then, he used this influence upon the Palestinians who then felt it was needful to be able to do suicide bombings in the occupied territories. Suicide bombings, of course, not only has a great ishqal and problem with it, it is not with the flavor of Islamic resistance. It doesn't yield the goals, and also drew the ire of the world community on the Palestinian resistance. Enter people like martyr Qasem Soleimani. And, with his influence, you would actually see that the structure of the Palestinian resistance was overhauled. The tunnels that were being tug [sic], and its relationship with the rest of the Islamic world, particularly those in Lebanon, particularly those in Iran, flourished, to such an extent that now, the so-called strongest army in West Asia still cannot defeat those people who have been starved for more than three months.

During the 2012 Gaza War, the Commander-in-Chief of the Islamic Revolutionary Guard Corps, Major-General Mohammad Ali Jafari said that due to the geographical isolation of the Gaza Strip, Iran cannot directly provide weapons to Hamas but still provides them with the technology and parts through the tunnels, which is then used by the al-Qassam Brigades to manufacture a Palestinian homemade version of the Iranian Fajr-5 missile that has managed to hit Israeli targets within Israel's capital Tel Aviv.

== Strategic objectives and uses ==
According to Eado Hecht, an Israeli defence analyst specialising in underground warfare, "Three different kinds of tunnels existed beneath Gaza, smuggling tunnels between Gaza and Egypt; defensive tunnels inside Gaza, used for command centres and weapons storage; and—connected to the defensive tunnels—offensive tunnels used for cross-border attacks on Israel", including the capture of Israeli soldiers.

American ambassador Daniel B. Shapiro examining a part of the Palestinian tunnel network uncovered by the Israeli military during Operation Protective Edge, 2014

The Jerusalem Center for Public Affairs, an Israeli security think tank, describes tunnel warfare as a shifting of the balance of power: "Tunnel warfare provided armies facing a technologically superior adversary with an effective means for countering its air superiority." According to the center, tunnels conceal missile launchers, facilitate attacks on strategic targets like Ben-Gurion Airport, and allow cross-border access to Israeli territory.

An editorial in The Washington Post described the tunnels as "using tons of concrete desperately needed for civilian housing" and also as endangering civilians because they were constructed under civilian homes in the "heavily populated Shijaiyah district" and underneath the al-Wafa Hospital.

Working on the tunnel system provides an outlet for Hamas militants to be productively engaged in relative peacetime.

Daphné Richemond-Barak, the author of “Underground Warfare,” wrote in Foreign Policy magazine: "Never in the history of tunnel warfare has a defender been able to spend months in such confined spaces. The digging itself, the innovative ways Hamas has made use of the tunnels and the group’s survival underground for this long have been unprecedented."

=== Defensive uses ===
An Al-Monitor report described tunnels within Gaza and away from the border that serve two purposes: storing and shielding weapons including rockets and launchers, and providing security and mobility to Hamas militants. The report indicated that the latter function occurs in a set of "security tunnels": "Every single leader of Hamas, from its lowest ranking bureaucrats to its most senior leaders, is intimately familiar with the route to the security tunnel assigned to him and his family." Twenty-three militants in the Qassam Brigades, the military wing of Hamas, survived Israeli shelling on 17 July 2014 and remained alive but trapped in a tunnel until the early August ceasefire. In October 2013, Ihab al-Ghussein, spokesman of the Interior Ministry of the Palestinian National Authority, described the tunnels as an exercise of Gaza's "right to protect itself." In October 2014, Hamas leader Khalid Mishal denied that the tunnels were ever to be used to attack civilians: "Have any of the tunnels been used to kill any civilian or any of the residents of such towns? No. Never! ... [Hamas] used them either to strike beyond the back lines of the Israeli army or to raid some military sites... This proves that Hamas is only defending itself."

The tunnels are used to conceal and protect weapons and militants and facilitate communication, making detection from the air difficult. In 2014, Hamas leader Khalid Meshal said in an interview with Vanity Fair that the tunnel system is a defensive structure, designed to place obstacles against Israel's powerful military arsenal and engage in counter-strikes behind the lines of the IDF. He said that the tunnels are used for infiltration of Israel, but said that offensive operations had never caused the death of civilians in Israel, and denied allegations of planned mass attacks on Israeli civilians.

Hamas logistics officer and weapons smuggler Mahmoud al-Mabhouh escaped Israeli forces through a smuggling tunnel in 1989 to Egypt.

During the 2012 Gaza war, Palestinian militants frequently made use of tunnels and bunkers to take cover from Israeli air strikes.

=== Offensive uses ===
Palestinian military personnel in Gaza explained to news website al-Monitor that the purpose of a cross-border tunnel was to conduct operations behind enemy lines in the event of an Israeli operation against Gaza. Hamas leader Yahya Sinwar, commenting on the strategic importance of the tunnels, stated: "Today, we are the ones who invade them; they do not invade us." The tunnels have been described by former Hamas Prime Minister Ismail Haniyeh as representative of "a new strategy in confronting the occupation and in the conflict with the enemy from underground and from above the ground." A Palestinian militia document obtained by al-Monitor and also published in The Washington Post described the objectives of the under-border tunnels:

The tunnel war is one of the most important and most dangerous military tactics in the face of the Israeli army because it features a qualitative and strategic dimension, because of its human and moral effects, and because of its serious threat and unprecedented challenge to the Israeli military machine, which is heavily armed and follows security doctrines involving protection measures and preemption. ... [The tactic is] to surprise the enemy and strike it a deadly blow that doesn't allow a chance for survival or escape or allow him a chance to confront and defend itself.

Israeli spokespersons have maintained that the aim of the tunnels is to harm Israel civilians. According to Prime Minister Benjamin Netanyahu, the "sole purpose" of the cross-border tunnels from Gaza to Israel is "the destruction of our citizens and killing of our children." The Israeli government has called the tunnels "terror tunnels," stating that they have a potential to target civilians and soldiers in Israel. Prime Minister Benjamin Netanyahu said that the aim was to abduct and kill civilians. An IDF spokesman said the goal is "to abduct or kill civilians but will make do with a soldier, too." The Israeli newspaper Ma'ariv reported that, according to unnamed Israeli security sources, the tunnels were to be utilized in a mass casualty terror attack planned to take place on the Jewish high holy day of Rosh Hashanah, 24 September 2014. The plan was described to reporter Ariel Kahane by the sources, and reportedly revealed to the Israeli security Cabinet by Prime Minister Binyamin Netanyahu. The alleged plot entailed a planned assault in which two hundred of heavily armed Hamas fighters would have emerged at night from more than a dozen tunnels to infiltrate Israeli territory, killing and/or abducting Israeli citizens.

A Gazan tunnel was used to carry out an attack for the first time in September 2001, in the context of the Second Palestinian Intifada, when "Palestinians detonated a 200-kilogram bomb inside a tunnel underneath the IDF border outpost of Termit on the Philadelphi corridor", resulting in the near-complete destruction of the outpost located in Rafah.

Hamas used tunnels to bomb an IDF outpost in Gaza in June 2004, killing one soldier and injuring five.

Shortly after the death of Yasser Arafat and purportedly in retaliation for the same, Hamas and Fatah tunneled under a border-crossing checkpoint at Rafah and detonated a bomb, killing five Israelis in the IDF outpost bombing attack, killing five Israeli soldiers and wounding six.

Hamas used a tunnel in June 2006 that exited near Kerem Shalom to conduct a cross-border raid that resulted in the death of two IDF soldiers and the kidnapping of a third, Gilad Shalit.

An Israeli soldier conducting maintenance work on the border fence in November 2012 was injured when Hamas's military wing, Izz al-Din Qassam Brigades, detonated a booby-trapped tunnel, and a 13-year-old Palestinian boy was killed by Israeli machine-gun fire following the explosion.

The tunnels were used in warfare on numerous occasions during the 2014 conflict. On at least four occasions during the conflict, Palestinian militants crossing the border through the tunnels engaged in combat with Israeli soldiers. Israeli officials reported four "incidents in which members of Palestinian armed groups emerged from tunnel exits located between 1.1 and 4.7 km from civilian homes." The Israeli government refers to cross-border tunnels as "attack tunnels" or "terror tunnels." According to Israel, the tunnels enabled the launch of rockets by remote control, and were intended to facilitate hostage-taking and mass-casualty attacks.

Hamas militants carrying RPGs and assault rifles crossed the Israeli border on 17 July 2014 through a tunnel about a mile away from the farming village of Sufa, but were stopped by Israeli Defense Forces. The Israeli military reported that thirteen armed men had exited the tunnel, and shared video footage of them being hit by the explosion of an airstrike. Israeli authorities claimed the purpose had been to attack civilians.

Two squads of armed Palestinian militants crossed the Israeli border on 21 July 2014 through a tunnel near Kibbutz Nir Am. The first squad of ten was killed by an Israeli air strike. A second squad killed four Israeli soldiers using an anti-tank weapon. The Jerusalem Post reported that the attackers sought to infiltrate Kibbutz Nir Am, but a senior intelligence source told the Times of Israel that "the Hamas gunmen were not in motion or en route to a kibbutz but rather had camouflaged themselves in the field, laying an ambush for an army patrol."

Hamas and Islamic Jihad militants attacked an Israeli military outpost on 28 July 2014 near Nahal Oz using a tunnel, killing five Israeli soldiers. One attacker was also killed.

Hamas militants emerging from a tunnel on 1 August 2014 attacked an Israeli patrol in Rafah, thus violating a humanitarian ceasefire, killing two Israeli soldiers. The militants returned to Rafah through a tunnel, bringing the body of Lieutenant Hadar Goldin with them. Israel at first believed that the militants had abducted Goldin and were holding him, but later determined that he had also been killed.

An unnamed senior intelligence source told The Times of Israel on 28 July 2014 that of the nine cross-border tunnels detected, none stretched into a civilian community, and that in the five infiltrations to that time Hamas had targeted soldiers rather than civilians. On 31 July 2014 IDF Army Radio quoted an unnamed senior military official as saying that "all the tunnels were aimed at military targets and not at the Gaza-vicinity communities". A UNHRC Commission of Inquiry on the Gaza Conflict published a report in 2015 concluding that during the 2014 conflict, "the tunnels were only used to conduct attacks directed at IDF positions in Israel in the vicinity of the Green Line, which are legitimate military targets." An Israeli intelligence source that spoke to Times of Israel indicated that none of the nine cross-border tunnels were aimed at civilian border communities. All the infiltration attempts focused on attacking military targets. The main aim of the attacks seems to have been to capture an IDF prisoner. Israeli officials condemned the UNHRC report.

Hamas launched an attack on Israel on 7 October 2023, taking 252 people hostage.

==== Psychological impact ====
Eitan Shamir and Hecht wrote that, during the 2014 Gaza War, one objective of conducting cross-border raids on Israeli communities using tunnels was to inflict psychological shock on the Israeli populations. A UN Commission of Inquiry found that "these tunnels and their use by Palestinian armed groups during the hostilities [of the 2014 Gaza War] caused great anxiety among Israelis that the tunnels might be used to attack civilians." According to Slesinger, the tunnels disrupt the Israelis' notion of territorial sovereignty and decreases the confidence of Israeli politicians' in their ability to manage external risks through ordinary border enforcement mechanisms such as patrols, fences, walls, and checkpoints–which in turn compromises the Israeli citizenry's "faith in the state's ability to provide security.

==== Kidnapping ====
Israel says that the kidnapping of Israeli civilians and soldiers is one of the primary goals of tunnel construction. The Wall Street Journal described an attack tunnel inspected by one of its reporters as "designed for launching murder and kidnapping raids", noting that the "3-mile-long tunnel was reinforced with concrete, lined with telephone wires, and included cabins unnecessary for infiltration operations but useful for holding hostages." In October 2013, the newspaper Haaretz noted that "[t]he IDF's working assumption [was] that such tunnels [would] be made operative whenever there is an escalation in the area, whether initiated by Hamas or by Israel, and [would] be used for attacks and abduction attempts", adding that "[i]f Hamas initiates such an escalation while holding several Israeli citizens or soldiers, it would be in a much stronger position." According to The New York Times, one tunnel contained "a kidnapping kit of tranquilizers and plastic handcuffs".

== Israel's countermeasures ==
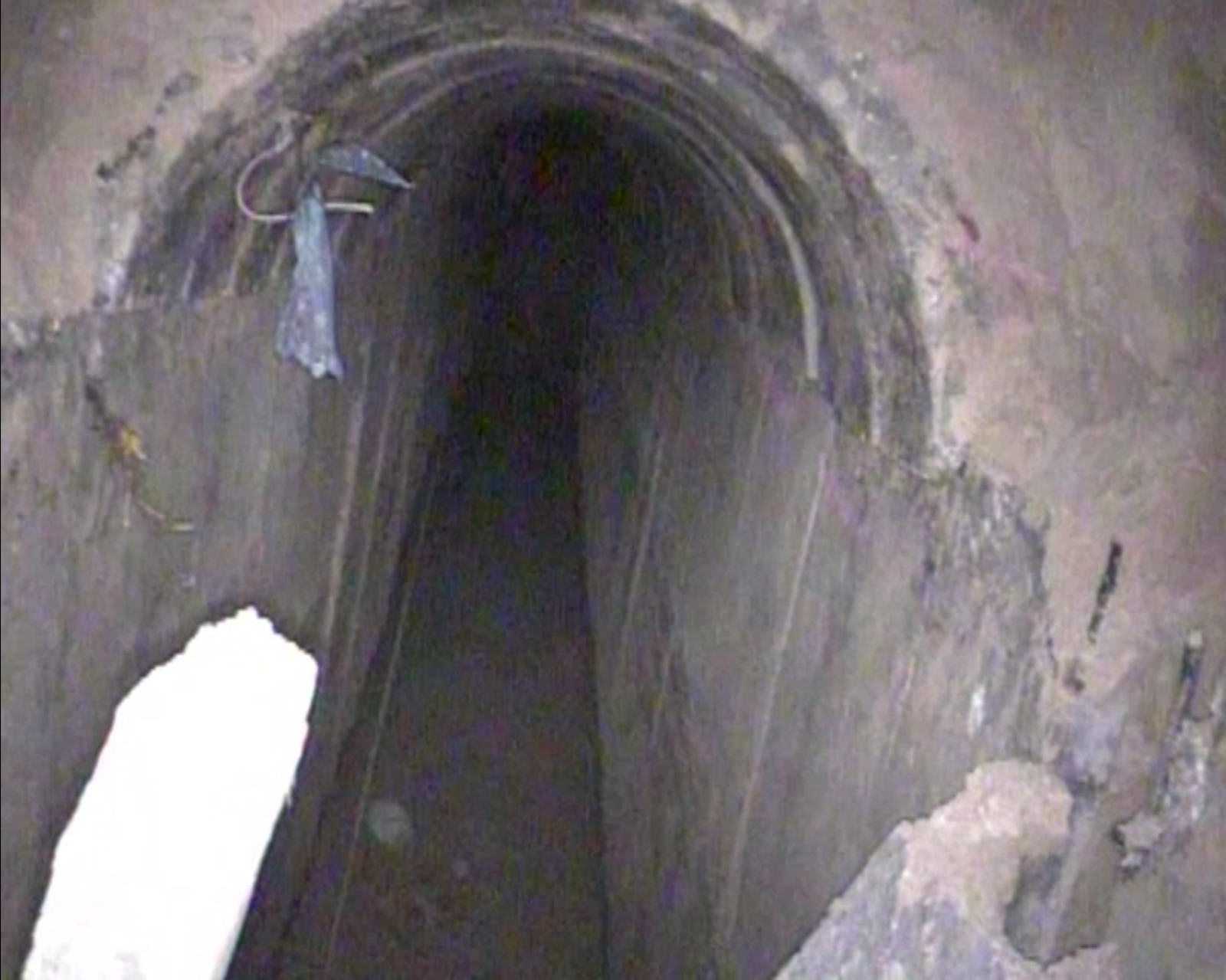
A Palestinian tunnel coming into Israel from the Gaza Strip, uncovered by the Israeli military between Kissufim and Nirim, 10 December 2017

Throughout the Second Intifada, the IDF launched numerous raids to counter-act the Palestinian use of tunnels, and had destroyed over 100 tunnels by June 2004.

The IDF identified 13 smuggling tunnels in October 2006 along the Philadelphi Route and The Jerusalem Post reported that IDF destroyed "five more tunnels".

The IDF identified a tunnel complex in November 2007, concealed in a tomato greenhouse with exits near Netiv HaAsara and Erez.

Six militants were killed and a tunnel within 300 m (980 ft) of the border fence was destroyed by Israeli forces in November 2008.

The IDF targeted 140 smuggling tunnels and 66 tunnels used for attacks during the 2012 Gaza War. An estimated 500 tunnels were thought to exist at that time. By the end of the operation, the network of attack tunnels had been largely destroyed.

A tunnel discovered in 2013 began in the Gazan village of Abasan al-Saghira with an initial depth at the entrance of 22 m (72 ft), a length of approximately 950 m (3,120 ft), a width of approximately 1.8 m (5.9 ft), a height of approximately 1.1 m (3.6 ft), and a final depth at the exit of 18 m (59 ft), opening into a spot some 2,800 m (1.7 mi) from the kibbutz of Ein HaShlosha.

According to Israel, between January and October 2013, three tunnels under the border were identified, two of which were packed with explosives.

The IDF demolished two cross-border tunnels in November 2013.

Destroying the tunnels was a primary objective of Israeli forces in the July–August 2014 conflict. The IDF reported that it "neutralized" 32 tunnels, fourteen of which crossed into Israel. A column in The Wall Street Journal cited Yigal Carmon, head of the Middle East Media Research Institute, as saying that it was the tunnels, and not the 2014 Gush Etzion kidnapping and murder that was the immediate cause of war in the summer of 2014. According to Carmon's reading of the situation, the tunnels gave Hamas the ability to stake a mass-casualty attack on the scale of the 2008 Islamist terror attack on the Taj Hotel in Mumbai that killed 164 people.

An Israeli airstrike on 5 July 2014 damaged a tunnel near kibbutz Kerem Shalom, and a group of Hamas military inspectors were killed in an explosion at the tunnel on 6 July 2014. According to Carmon, this may have persuaded Hamas that Israel was becoming aware of the scale of the capacity for militants to infiltrate Israel via tunnels, making a successful surprise mass-casualty attack less likely, and convincing the Hamas leadership to go to war immediately before more of the tunnels could be discovered and destroyed.

The IDF killed six Hamas militants on 6 July 2014 in an attack on a cross-border tunnel near Rafah. This resulted in an escalation in the Israeli-Palestinian conflict, and was a key impetus to the 2014 Israel–Gaza conflict.

The IDF foiled an attempt on 17 July 2014 by 13 militants to launch an attack near the kibbutz Sufa.

The IDF announced on 11 August 2014 they had successfully tested a system that could be used to detect these tunnels. This new system uses a combination of sensors and special transmitters to locate tunnels. The IDF expects development to cost up to NIS 1.5 billion, and could be deployed within the year.

The IDF located a cross-border tunnel exiting near the area of Holit in May 2016, that had apparently been rebuilt as a bypass after initially being destroyed during Operation Protective Edge.

Israel began the construction of a border wall in the summer of 2017 which stretched several meters underground to counter tunnel assaults. The structure is equipped with sensors to detect future tunnel construction. Concrete for the structure was produced using five concrete factories dedicated to the project and about 10 meters was completed daily. The structure was placed entirely on Israeli land.

Israeli forces destroyed a tunnel on 30 October 2017 that crossed the Gaza border into Israeli territory. Twelve Palestinians, including ten members of Islamic Jihad Movement in Palestine and two Hamas militants, were killed in the blast and subsequent rescue efforts. The most senior person killed was Brigade Commander Arafat Marshood of Islamic Jihad's al-Quds Brigades.

Israeli forces destroyed an additional tunnel that crossed the border on 10 December 2017.

Following the destruction of an attack tunnel from Gaza that crossed into Egypt and Israel in January 2018, IDF Major General Yoav Mordechai, speaking in Arabic, said, "I want to send a message to everyone who is digging or gets too close to the tunnels: As you've seen in the past two months, these tunnels bring only death," referring to Hamas tunnels that had recently been destroyed by Israel. Major General Eyal Zamir stated that more Hamas tunnels into Israel would be destroyed as the construction of a barrier around the Gaza Strip will soon be completed.

The Israeli military announced in April 2018 it destroyed a tunnel that was called the "longest ever" and stretched several kilometers from inside the Gaza Strip, near Jabalia, and reached several meters into Israel, towards Nahal Oz, though no exit had yet been built.

An Israeli airstrike destroyed a naval tunnel belonging to Hamas militants for the first time in June 2018.

The Israeli Ministry of Defense released the first pictures of an underwater barrier with Gaza in August 2018, designed to prevent Hamas infiltrations by sea. Construction of the barrier started two months before and is expected to be completed by the end of the year, stretching two hundred meters into the Mediterranean.

The Israeli military destroyed a tunnel in the southern Gaza Strip in October 2018 that was 1 km (0.62 mi) long, 200 m (660 ft) of which encroached upon Israeli territory.

Israeli airstrikes in May 2021 destroyed over 100 kilometers of tunnel network inside Gaza during Operation Guardian of the Walls.

The Israeli Ministry of Defense announced in December 2021 that a 65-kilometer underground barrier to deal with the threat of cross-border tunnels along the border with Gaza had been completed.

The Israeli Defense Forces were reported to be considering the use of sponge bombs in October 2023 as a non-lethal means of sealing tunnels during their incursion into the Gaza Strip.

The Egyptian government has also regarded the tunnels as a security risk. In 2013, Egypt attempted to destroy certain tunnels along its Gaza border by filling them with sewage and demolishing houses that hid their entrances, according to Joel Roskin, a geology professor at Bar-Ilan University.

== See also ==
- Anti-tunnel barrier along the Gaza–Israel border
- Gaza Strip smuggling tunnels
- Sinaloa Cartel#Tijuana Airport/Drug Super Tunnels
- 2014 Nahal Oz attack
- Mahmoud Rushdi Eshtewi
- Hezbollah tunnels
- Củ Chi tunnels
