= Maoz Inon =

Israeli peace activist and entrepreneur

- מעוז ינון
- Born: 1975 (age 50–51); Kibbutz Nir Am, Israel
- Occupations: Entrepreneur, peace activist
- Known for: Founding several tourism initiatives including the Jesus Trail, Fauzi Azar Inn, and Abraham Hostels
- Children: 3

Maoz Inon (Hebrew: מעוז ינון; born 1975) is an Israeli entrepreneur and peace activist. Inon has founded several tourism initiatives within Israel and the Middle East, including the Jesus Trail, Fauzi Azar Inn, and Abraham Hostel and Tour brands. Since the murder of his parents in the Hamas attack on Israel on 7 October 2023, Inon has become a voice for peace between Israelis and Palestinians within international media.

== Early life ==
Maoz Inon was born in kibbutz Nir Am in the north-western Negev. At age 14 he moved with his family to a nearby Israeli community, Netiv HaAsara, just next to the Israeli border with Gaza.

== Career ==
Inon's work in the tourism industry has largely focused on attracting backpackers and independent travellers to Israel. He subscribes to the idea that improving responsible tourism will also drive positive political change through boosts to the local economy.

In 2005, Maoz Inon set up the Fauzi Azar Inn guesthouse in the Old City of Nazareth in a partnership with a local Arab family (The Azar Family). The hostel was set up as a way to help rejuvenate the Old City that had struggled with high levels of crime, dilapidation and low numbers of tourists. It was also envisaged as a platform for cross-cultural dialogue between Jewish and Arab Israelis, and for education for international tourists about Israel. In 2011, Maoz's guesthouse received the World Responsible Tourism Award for its commitment to sustainable community development practices. That same year, British Prime Minister Tony Blair also visited the guesthouse. The Fauzi Azar Inn led to a tourism revival in the Old City of Nazareth, with a number of guesthouses opening since the Fauzi Azar's existence and local shopkeepers reporting a growth in business.

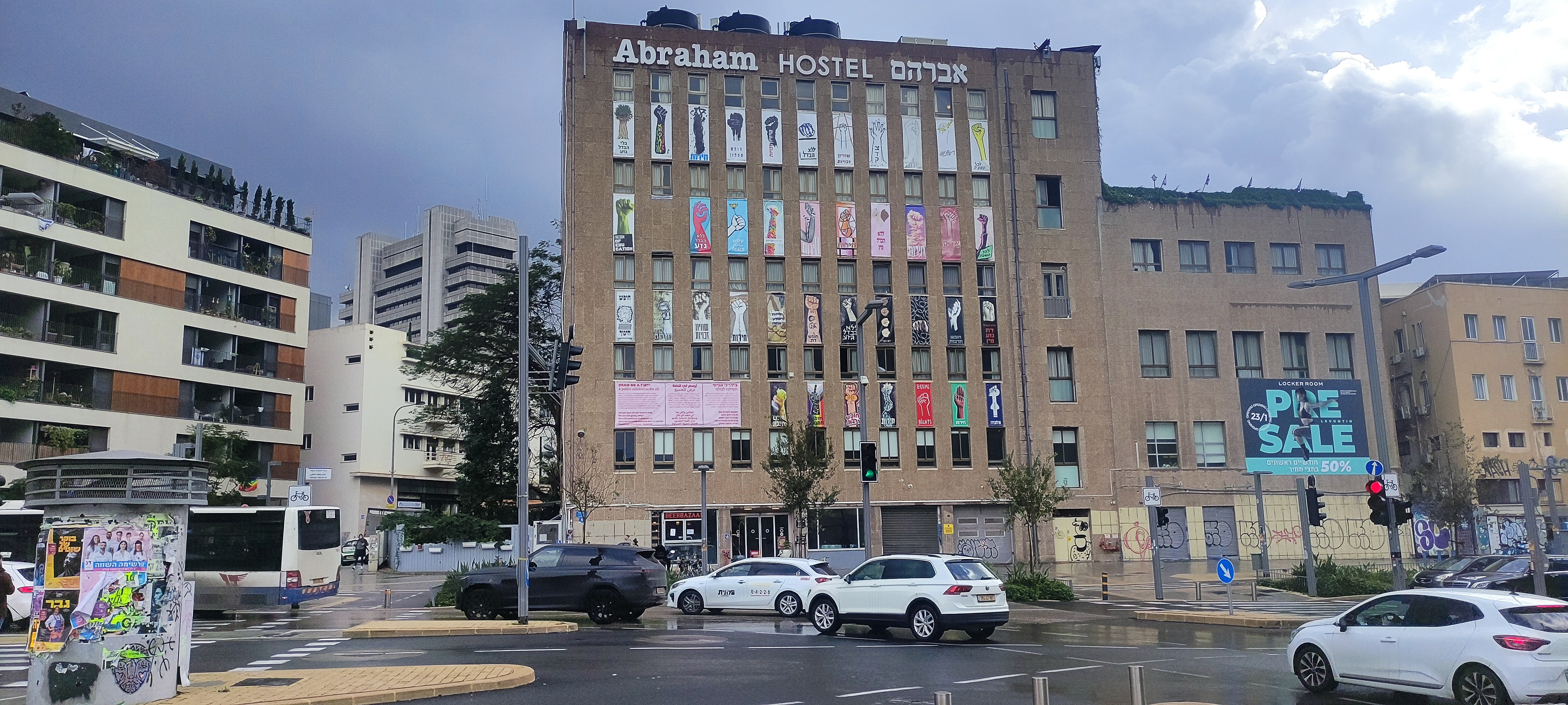
Abraham Hostel in Tel Aviv

In 2007, Maoz Inon established another project in the Galilee, the Jesus Trail. The 65 km trail was inspired by Maoz's personal experience of long-distance hiking he had done across the world and a perceived need to connect the region's various religious sites and communities with a walking path. The trail is committed to environmental protection and encourages local communities to take responsibility for waste disposal. In 2011, British Prime Minister Tony Blair walked the first section of the trail together with Maoz.

In 2008, Inon co-founded Israel Hostels, an independent travellers' accommodation network.

Together with Israeli entrepreneur Gal Mor and a collection of investors, Maoz Inon founded the first Abraham Hostel in Jerusalem in 2010. Over time, the Abraham Hostels group has grown to become the largest hostel chain in Israel, with additional locations in Tel Aviv and Eilat, and a location in the Philippines. The company also runs a tour operation. The Abraham Hostels and Tour Group is named after the biblical figure of Abraham, whom the owners consider as a "unifying symbol among the area's prominent faiths" and who serves as a "fitting representation of what we hope to bring to the world". While some have been critical of some of the group's ventures, such as running tours to the Occupied Palestinian Territories, others have praised the company for promoting dialogue about sensitive issues in the region.

== Activism ==
On 7 October 2023, Maoz's parents, Bilha and Yakovi Inon, were killed when their house was hit by a close-range missile in the Netiv HaAsara massacre. Since the attack, Maoz Inon has appeared on international media outlets across the world calling for an end to the violence in the region and the need for peace between Israelis and Palestinians. Maoz Inon has called for the Israeli government to negotiate a ceasefire with Hamas. On 7 November, Inon and Yaakov Godo, another Israeli who had lost a relative in the 7 October attacks, began a vigil in a mourner's tent outside the Knesset, saying they would not leave until prime minister Benjamin Netanyahu resigned.

In April 2024, Maoz Inon, together with Palestinian peace activist Aziz Abu Sarah, spoke at a TED event in Vancouver, Canada. In the talk, they reflect on their personal losses related to the Israeli-Palestinian conflict and their decision to come together to work for peace between Israelis and Palestinians. A month later, the pair were met and embraced by Pope Francis at the Arena for Peace event in Verona, Italy.

In December 2024, the French and German governments jointly awarded Inon the Franco-German Prize for Human Rights and the Rule of Law for his activism.

One year after having met Pope Francis, Inon, together with Abu Sarah, met Pope Leo in the Vatican. There, Pope Leo praised the pair for "generating hope" through their work; praising their approach to working for peace in Israel/Palestine from the bottom up. Soon after meeting Pope Leo, Inon was part of the "It's Time" summit that took place in May 2025 in Jerusalem. The summit was an attempt to revive the Israeli peace camp at a time when the Gaza war was dominating international headlines.

In December 2025, Maoz Inon was the recipient of two awards in recognition of his work for peace. One award, the "Champion of Shared Society" award, was given by the Israeli organisation Abraham Initiatives in recognition of his work towards peaceful co-existence between Jews and Arabs in Israel, while in Italy, Inon, together with Abu Sarah, received the Puglisi Prize from the Archdiocese of Palermo.

In 2026, Inon and Abu Sarah co-wrote a book entitled The Future is Peace.

== Personal life ==
In the early 2000s, Inon and his wife were based in Tel Aviv. After the two spent several months hiking Patagonia and the Pacific Crest Trail in California, they were inspired to improve backpacking opportunities in Israel.

As of 2010, Inon was based in Binyamina. He and his wife have three children.

Inon's parents, who lived in Netiv HaAsara, were killed in the 2023 Hamas attack on Israel, after a rocket propelled grenade launched by Hamas started a fire in their home.
