= Netiv HaAsara massacre =

Hamas attack in Israel

- Part of the October 7 attacks
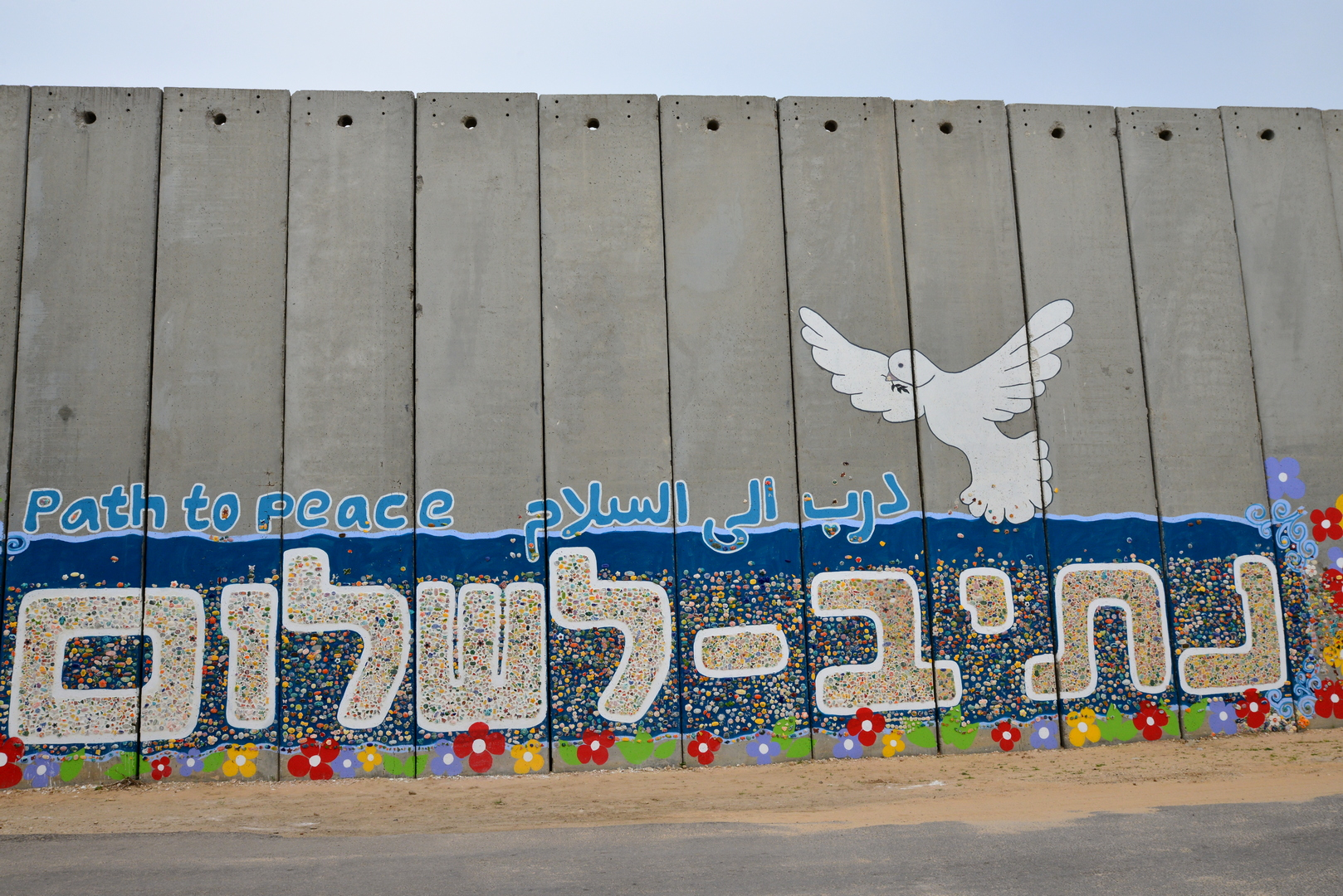

- Site of the attack in Israel
- Native name: הטבח בנתיב העשרה
- Location: 31°34′15″N 34°32′22″E; Netiv HaAsara, Southern District, Israel
- Date: 7 October 2023; 3 years ago
- Attack type: Mass shooting, mass murder, war crime
- Deaths: 17-20 Israelis (including 3 security officers); 1 Hamas fighter
- Injuries: 2
- Victim: No hostages taken
- Perpetrator: Hamas

The Netiv HaAsara massacre occurred during the October 7 attacks. Three Hamas fighters on paragliders attacked Netiv HaAsara, an Israeli moshav close to the border fence. The militants killed at least 17 people. Before the massacre, the moshav was home to approximately 900 residents. The lengthy response time of the Israel Defense Forces (IDF) has been criticized by survivors. Additionally, an IDF investigation criticized the conduct of the 37 Israeli soldiers and security officers present, finding that they were unable to stop the massacre despite outnumbering the militants.

== Background ==
Netiv HaAsara is a moshav of 900 people. It was founded in 1982 by Israelis who left the Sinai after it was given back to Egypt in the Camp David Accords. Following the Israeli disengagement from Gaza in 2005, Netiv HaAsara became one of the closest Israeli communities to the Gaza Strip, approximately 400 meters from the Palestinian town of Beit Lahia. Palestinian workers were replaced by Thai workers. The moshav received sporadic rocket fire from Gaza, and residents in Netiv HaAsara have reported witnessing Hamas militants training.

== Attack ==
Between 6:39 and 6:42 a.m. on 7 October 2023, three Hamas militants infiltrated separate areas of Netiv HaAsara on motorized paragliders as an advance party ahead of the main force of an estimated 30 fighters from Hamas' Nukhba forces, who were to infiltrate by land from Gaza. A local security officer and his son, who was an off-duty soldier, spotted two of the militants before they landed and opened fire before alerting the rest of the security team of 25. They fired dozens of rounds at them. Although they failed to hit the militants they disrupted their landing, forcing them to land separately and delaying their regrouping. The main force attempted to infiltrate the moshav, but they were unable to breach its perimeter wall and retreated towards the Erez crossing. However, the three fighters in the moshav began to massacre residents.

Netiv HaAsara's security coordinator sent a WhatsApp message alerting the 25-member security team, instructing them to aim their guns out their windows to defend their homes and neighbors, fearing the possibility of friendly fire with the IDF if they went outside to engage the attackers. Unlike other local settlements in which the local weapons were mostly kept in armories, the members of Netiv HaAsara's security team kept their weapons at home. Two security team members defied orders and left their homes to fight but the majority remained in their homes with their weapons at the ready. Eight soldiers from the 7th Armored Brigade's 77th Battalion arrived at the moshav at around the same time, bringing the total number of armed personnel to 37, including a battalion commander.

At the time of the invasion, many residents had fled to their home's safe rooms after the initial rocket barrage at 6:29 a.m. For the first two hours of the invasion, residents did not know that Hamas militants had entered Israeli territory due to the unavailability of power or internet access. Some residents were trapped in safe rooms without power.

One of the gunmen was killed by a local security officer, Alon Keren, at 7:07 a.m. The other two continued massacring residents until 8:10. Between 8:12 and 8:15 a.m., members of the security team and soldiers confronted the remaining two gunmen and exchanged fire with them. One local security officer was killed in the shootout before the militants fled towards Gaza, hiding in a grove near the moshav before returning to Gaza at 8:34 a.m., where they would be killed later in the war. At 7:15 a.m., the Israeli Air Force (IAF) targeted a tunnel that was thought to have been used to send Hamas fighters to the moshav, resulting in the IAF's first attack on Hamas of the Gaza war. No militants were in the tunnel. A minute earlier, a combat drone attacked militants at the moshav but missed.

Reinforcements were sent to the moshav by 11:30 a.m. Between 12:14 and 12:47 p.m., seven unaffiliated Palestinian looters infiltrated the moshav in cars through the breached Gaza–Israel barrier. Some of them broke into a home and were shot at by the homeowner, injuring one. Four of the Palestinians were captured by the IDF, while the rest fled to Gaza.

At least 17 residents were killed in the attack, including three members of the moshav's security team. Some sources have reported that 20 residents were killed. No soldiers from the IDF were killed, and no residents were taken as hostages.

=== Gil Taasa ===
Gil Taasa, a firefighter and security officer, was killed after Hamas militants threw a grenade into the shelter where he was hiding with his two sons. According to his children, he had shot at the Hamas fighters until his bullets ran out and then later jumped on the grenade to save them. Footage of Taasa's death shows a Hamas militant taking the distraught and injured children into the kitchen and offering them a drink. He then takes a bottle of soda from the refrigerator and leaves the house. The children then left the house to find their mother next door. She attempted to call for help but reported that Israeli security forces did not immediately respond, later accusing the Israeli government of abandoning them. One of the children lost his eye in the attack and sustained shrapnel injuries. According to the IDF, the militant in the video was a commander in the Daraj-Tuffah Battalion, and they assassinated him in a September 2024 strike near al-Ahli Hospital.

=== Yakov and Bilha Inon ===
The victims also included Yakov and Bilha Inon, parents of Israeli peace activist Maoz Inon. Two bodies were found inside the ruins of their incinerated house after the attack. Yakov's body was identified soon afterwards, but Bilha was officially considered missing, which her children disputed. In August 2024, the IDF announced that they had used "complex testing" to determine that Bilha had died in the attack. Since the October 7 attacks, Maoz Inon has repeatedly criticized the Israeli government and called for peace between Israelis and Palestinians.

== Aftermath ==
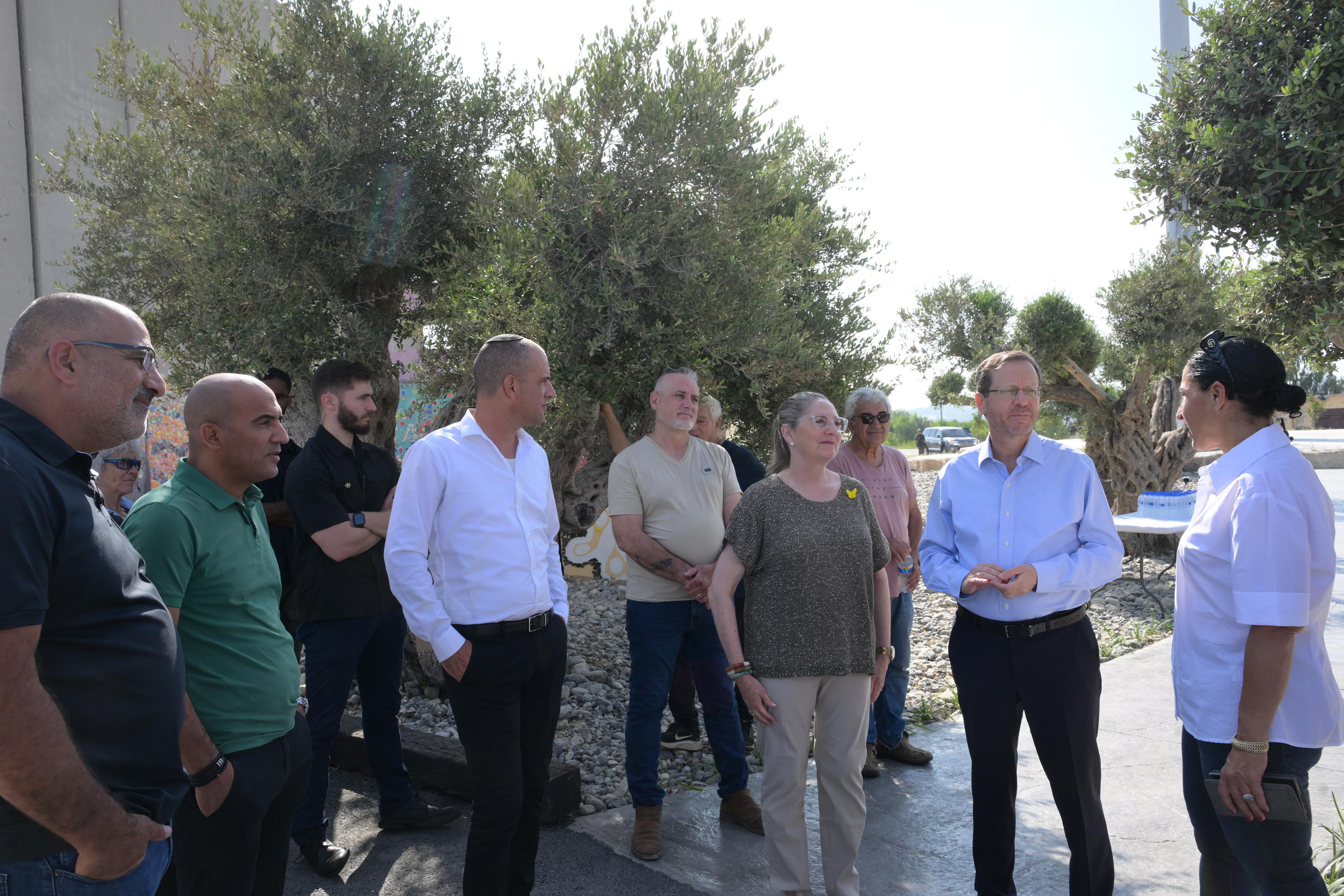
President Isaac Herzog's July 2024 visit to Netiv HaAsara

After the massacre, most residents were displaced from Netiv HaAsara; many were temporarily housed by the Israeli government in Ashkelon. As of October 2024, only about 100 people lived in Netiv HaAsara. In September 2025, the Israeli government reported that 83% of residents had returned and 12 additional families had become residents. The victims of the attack are commemorated by a garden with an Israeli flag surrounded by twenty olive trees.

In January 2026, BBC News paid £28,000 ($37,700) in damages to a family for filming in their Netiv HaAsara home without their consent after the massacre.

=== Investigation ===
Survivors have criticized the Israeli government for not preventing the attack and for the lengthy response time of the IDF. In March 2025, the IDF's investigation into the massacre was released. It was highly critical of the conduct of the security team and IDF troops present, describing it as the "most frustrating" of the October 7 battle reports. Despite full military superiority over the militants, with a large security team that was one of the best-trained such teams in the region, as well the rapid arrival of IDF troops including a senior commander, the 37 armed Israelis present failed to stop three militants from carrying out a massacre in the moshav. The investigation found that the security coordinator ordered members of the security team to remain in their homes instead of confronting the militants. The security coordinator later explained his actions as a lapse in judgement and due to fear of friendly fire from IDF troops. The investigation also found that the IDF troops present did not follow proper procedure, with them failing to secure the area and carrying out slow scans of the moshav.

== See also ==
- Nova music festival massacre
- Gaza war
- Outline of the Gaza war
- List of military engagements during the Gaza war
- Palestinian political violence
- Moshe Dayan's eulogy for Ro'i Rothberg
- List of massacres in Israel
