= Netiv HaAsara, Sinai =

Former Israeli settlement in Sinai, Egypt

Coordinates: 31°12′48″N 34°13′7″E

Netiv HaAsara (Hebrew: נְתִיב הָעֲשָׂרָה, lit. 'Path of the Ten') was a moshav and Israeli settlement in the Sinai Peninsula.

== History ==
Located near Yamit, it was founded in 1973 under the name Minyan. It was later renamed Netiv HaAsara after ten soldiers that were killed in a helicopter accident south of Rafah in 1971.

The moshav was evacuated in 1982 as part of the Camp David Accords, and its residents temporarily resettled in Ashkelon. Later that same year, some of its residents re-established the settlement in the north-western Negev desert, near the Gaza Strip. The evacuated families later received $543,000 each in compensation from the Israeli government.
