= Zvi Guershoni =

Israeli politician (1915–1976)

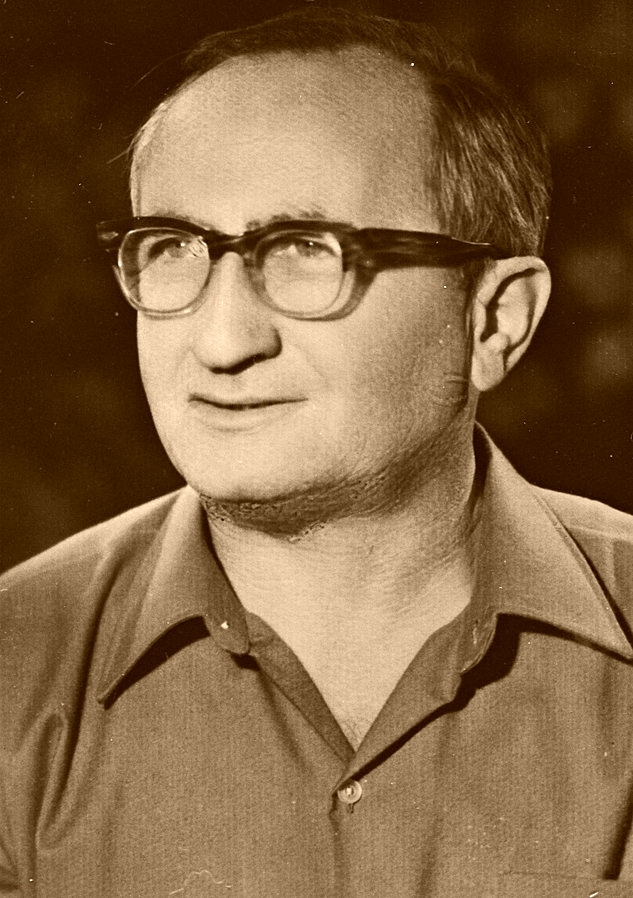
- Guershoni in 1969

Faction represented in the Knesset
- 1969–1976: Alignment

Personal details
- Born: 1915 Bălţi, Russian Empire
- Died: 1 September 1976 (aged 60–61)

Zvi Guershoni (Hebrew: צבי גרשוני; 1915 – 1 September 1976) was an Israeli politician who served as a member of the Knesset for the Alignment between 1969 and his death in 1976.

== Biography ==
Born in Bălți in the Beletsky Uyezd of the Bessarabia Governorate of the Russian Empire (today in Moldova), Guershoni attended a Hebrew gymnasium. He was a Maccabi Hatzair member before joining Gordonia. He became a member of the Gordonia leadership in Romania, and was also a member of the central committee of the Romanian branch of HeHalutz.

In 1936 he emigrated to Mandatory Palestine, where he initially worked in orchards in Rehovot. Between 1937 and 1940 he worked in the Port of Haifa, before being amongst the founders of kibbutz Nir Am in 1943. Between 1946 and 1947 he travelled to Holocaust survivor camps in Europe.

During the 1948 Arab-Israeli War he served as secretary of the Negev Settlements Committee, and was later a member of Mapai-affiliated Ihud HaKvutzot VeHaKibbutzim movement, serving as its secretary of internal affairs. He also studied economics at the Hebrew University of Jerusalem.

In 1969 he was elected to the Knesset on the Alignment list. He was re-elected in 1973, but died in office on 1 September 1976. His seat was taken by Senetta Yoseftal.
