= Fauzi Azar Inn =

Guest house in Nazareth, Israel

Coordinates: 32°42′16.59″N 35°17′43.25″E

Fauzi Azar by Abraham Hostels (formerly known as Fauzi Azar Inn) is a guesthouse located in the old city of Nazareth, Israel. It is on the Jesus Trail. In recent years, the Fauzi Azar has played a role in working with the Christian Arab community of Nazareth through various projects.

== History ==
The Fauzi Azar was once the home of the Azars, a wealthy family residing in the city of Nazareth. It was built in 1830 by Habib Azar, while the Inn itself was named after one of his great-grandsons, Fauzi. The family remained in the area until the 1948 Arab–Israeli War, when they relocated to Syria.

The house was converted into a guesthouse in May 2005 by Israeli entrepreneur Maoz Inon, having decided to build a hostel in the city of Nazareth to serve as a way-point for hikers, travelers, and tourists.

== Architecture ==
The 19th-century building built from stone has been preserved and restored over the years. The three-story building has original hand painted ceilings, Turkish marble floors, and limestone arches.

== Community outreach ==
The Fauzi Azar has sponsored community-based projects with the hopes of reinvigorating the old city in Nazareth. They also host a volunteer program in which international volunteers come to Israel to live in the old city while working there.

In November 2011, they received the Virgin Holidays Responsible Tourism Award for Best Accommodation for Local Communities.

== Famous visitors ==
In June 2011, Tony Blair, former prime minister of the United Kingdom visited the Fauzi Azar during a tour of Israel's Nativity Route. He visited the Fauzi Azar while in Nazareth following the first section of the Jesus Trail.

In December 2011, Tony Wheeler, founder of the Lonely Planet travel guide stayed at the Inn as a guest, and hiked the Jesus Trail with Inon.

== See also ==
- Nazareth
- Tourism in Israel
