= Sponge bomb =

Non-lethal bomb used to seal tunnels

A sponge bomb is a specialized device designed to seal the end of a tunnel. Small enough that it can be set by a single person, it is a non-explosive, chemical bomb that releases a burst of expanding foam that quickly hardens.

== Development ==
The sponge bomb was developed by the Israel Defense Forces (IDF) to address the use of tunnels by Hamas in Gaza.

== Design ==
Housed in a plastic container, the bomb has a metal partition that separates two liquid reagents. Once the partition is removed, the liquids mix and react, causing them to rapidly expand and then solidify, creating a physical barrier blocking the tunnel. The device is either set at its target by an individual or thrown.

In 2021, testing of sponge bombs was reportedly conducted by IDF in simulated tunnels.

The expanding foam is created by mixing two components: an isocyanate (methylene diphenyl diisocyanate or toluene diisocyanate) and a polyol resin. When combined, these chemicals undergo a rapid exothermic reaction that produces carbon dioxide, causing the liquid to expand up to 60 times its volume before hardening into a solid, durable plastic

During initial testing of these bombs, the liquid emulsion was found to be hazardous to work with when mishandled – some Israeli soldiers lost their eyesight.

== Historical perspective ==
This is not the first time that sticky foam has been used by a military force. Reportedly, the U.S. Marine Corps and the U.S. Army have used streams of foam as non-lethal tools for crowd control or restraint of hostile combatants.
