= Inbal Rabin-Lieberman =

Israeli security coordinator (born 1998)

- ענבל ליברמן
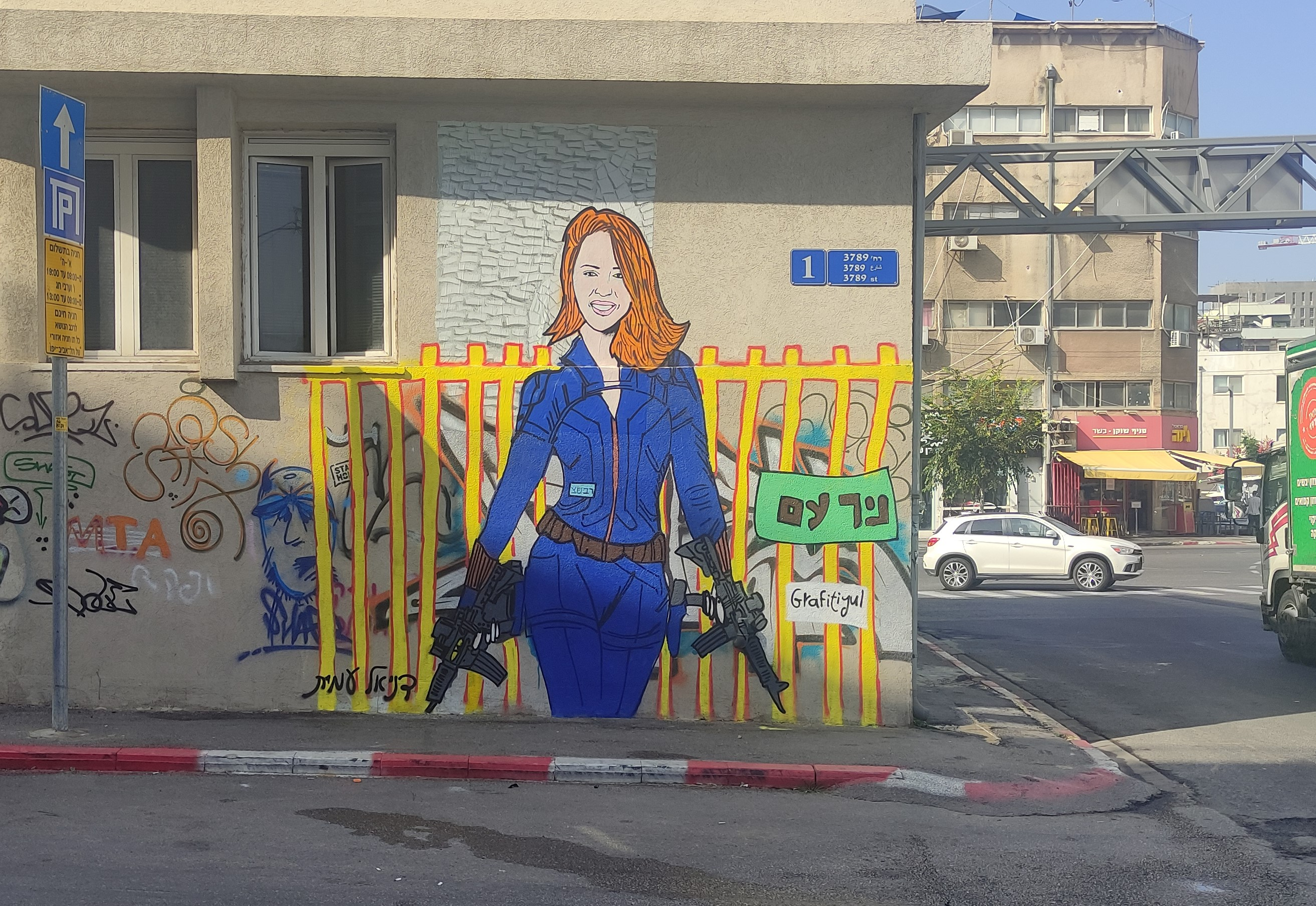
- Street art of Inbal Liberman. Located in the Kiryat Hamelacha neighborhood of Tel Aviv, it was created by artists Daniel Amit and Grafitiyul
- Born: 9 October 1998 (age 27); Nir Am, Israel

Inbal Rabin-Lieberman (Hebrew: ענבל ליברמן; born 9 October 1998) is an Israeli woman who served as the security coordinator of kibbutz Nir Am. Because of her actions, Nir-Am was one of only two communities invaded by militants from the Gaza Strip on 7 October 2023 that did not suffer Israeli casualties during the attacks (the other was Ein HaBesor).

== Early life and education ==
Inbal Rabin-Liberman was born in Kibbutz Nir Am and continued to reside there as of October 2023. She served in a combat unit of the Israel Defense Forces, and later studied at the Women's Leadership School.

=== Security coordinator ===
In December 2022, the kibbutz appointed Inbal Rabin-Lieberman as its security coordinator. Her duties included helping secure the kibbutz during emergencies, until police or military reinforcements could arrive. Before her appointment, the position was held by her uncle Ami Rabin. Rabin-Lieberman became the first woman in the kibbutz to hold the position. After the appointment, she received congratulations from Ofir Libstein, head of the regional council of Shaar Ha-Negev.

== Gaza war ==
On 7 October 2023, Rabin-Lieberman heard unusual noises near the kibbutz. She assessed the significance of the threat and quickly distributed weapons among the 12 members of the quick response group manned by residents of the kibbutz, including her uncle. She ran between houses, organizing men in different ambushes around the perimeter of the kibbutz and developed a plan to protect the settlement.

Rabin-Lieberman and her fellow citizens held off the attackers for three hours, killing 25 militants before the IDF arrived. Afterwards, she evacuated with other residents, staying in a hotel in Tel Aviv. On 9 October, she celebrated her birthday, on which Mayor Ron Huldai passed by to congratulate her.

Rabin-Liberman's name has become a household name. Thus, on 7 November 2023, when Knesset member Merav Michaeli (Labour) tried to criticize Minister Itamar Ben-Gvir (Jewish Power) for trying to soften the requirements for a license to carry weapons, the minister replied to her: "Don’t be Merav, be Inbal."

== Honors ==
In 2024 Rabin-Lieberman was honored as one of the torchbearers in the national Israeli Independence Day ceremony.

== See also ==
- Be'eri massacre
- Re'im music festival massacre
