= Hassan Hassanzadeh =

Iranian brigader general in the IRGC (born 1969)

Sardar Hassan Hassanzadeh
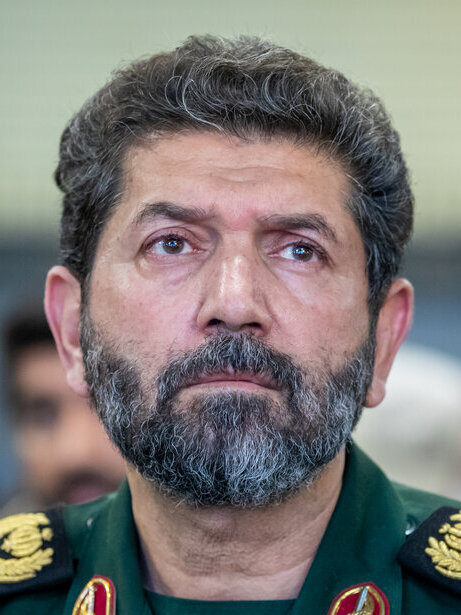
- Hassanzadeh in 2025
- Born: 1969 (age 56–57)
- Military career
- Allegiance: Iran
- Branch: Islamic Revolutionary Guard Corps
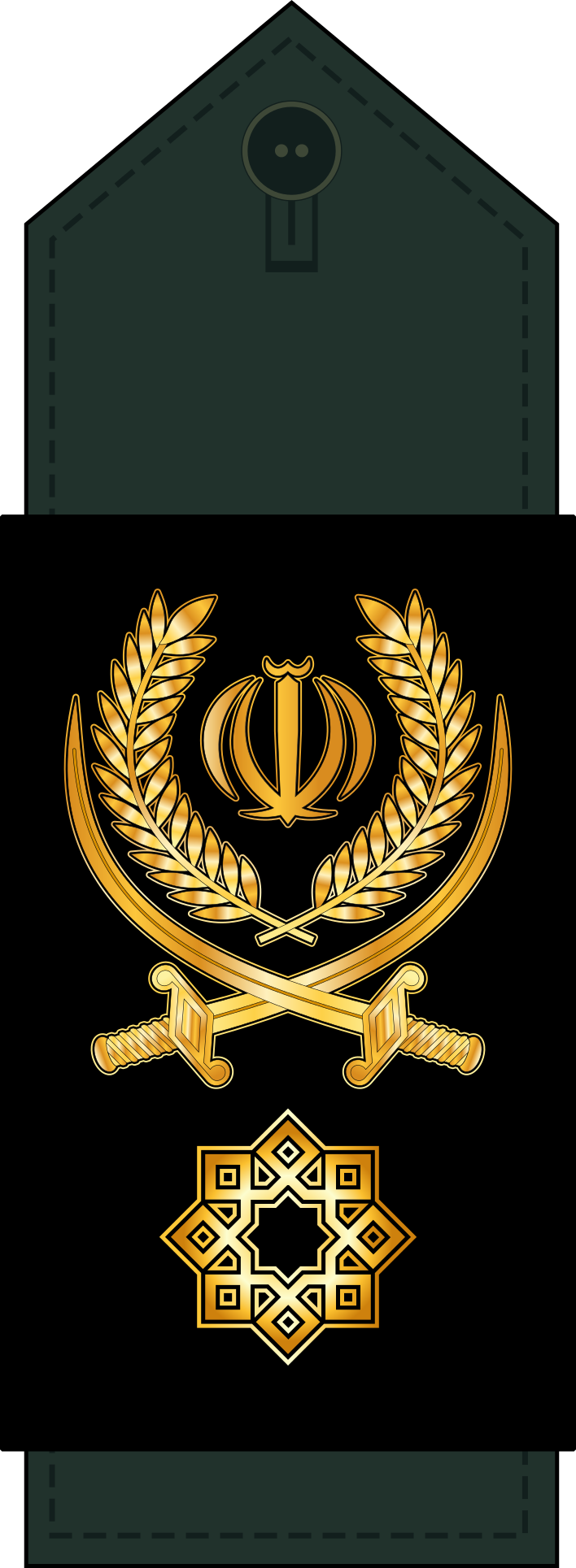
- Rank: Brigadier general
- Unit: Basij
- Commands: Semnan Provincial Corps; Seyyed al-Shohada Corps; Mohammad Rasulullah Corps
- Conflicts: Iran–Israel–United States war

Hassan Hassanzadeh (Persian: حسن حسن‌زاده; born 1969) is an Iranian brigadier general in the Islamic Revolutionary Guard Corps. He serves as commander of the Mohammad Rasulullah Corps in Greater Tehran since November 2020.

Hassanzadeh previously served as commander of the Semnan Provincial Corps from 2017 to 2018, and as commander of the Seyyed al-Shohada Corps of Tehran Province from 2018 to 2020.

== Biography ==
Hassanzadeh also held positions as commander of the Quds Headquarters of Tharallah and the Amir al-Mu'minin Basij Resistance District in Tehran.

He served as commander of the Semnan Provincial Corps (2017–2018) and the Seyyed al-Shohada Corps (2018–2020). From 22 November 2020 until 29 March 2026, he commanded the Mohammad Rasulullah Corps in Greater Tehran.

He was promoted to brigadier general on 1 April 2022 in a ceremony attended by Major General Mohammad Bagheri and other Revolutionary Guard commanders.

== Sanctions ==
United Kingdom On 14 November 2022, the United Kingdom sanctioned Hassanzadeh along with several Iranian officials for the "violent suppression of protests following the death of Mahsa Amini". The sanctions included a travel ban and asset freeze.

United States In December 2022, the United States sanctioned Hassanzadeh and other Iranian officials for "human rights violations during the 2022 protests in Iran".

== Views ==
=== $55 trillion claim ===
On 2 December 2022, during the Mahsa Amini protests, Hassanzadeh claimed that "the Americans spent $55 trillion to create media in Arab countries and surrounding regions to direct the recent unrest". This figure greatly exceeded the total U.S. federal budget, which was approximately $6 trillion for 2022.

== Role in internal security ==
Hassanzadeh was considered a key figure in Tehran's security structure and played a prominent role in internal security operations, including the suppression of protests. Reports suggest that from January 2026 onward, he had a direct role in overseeing crackdowns and street-level violence against protesters.

During the Mahsa Amini protests in Tehran, forces under his command were accused of direct fire on civilians and violent confrontations with demonstrators.
