= Netiv HaAsara =

Moshav in southern Israel

Netiv HaAsara: נְתִיב הָעֲשָׂרָה (Hebrew)
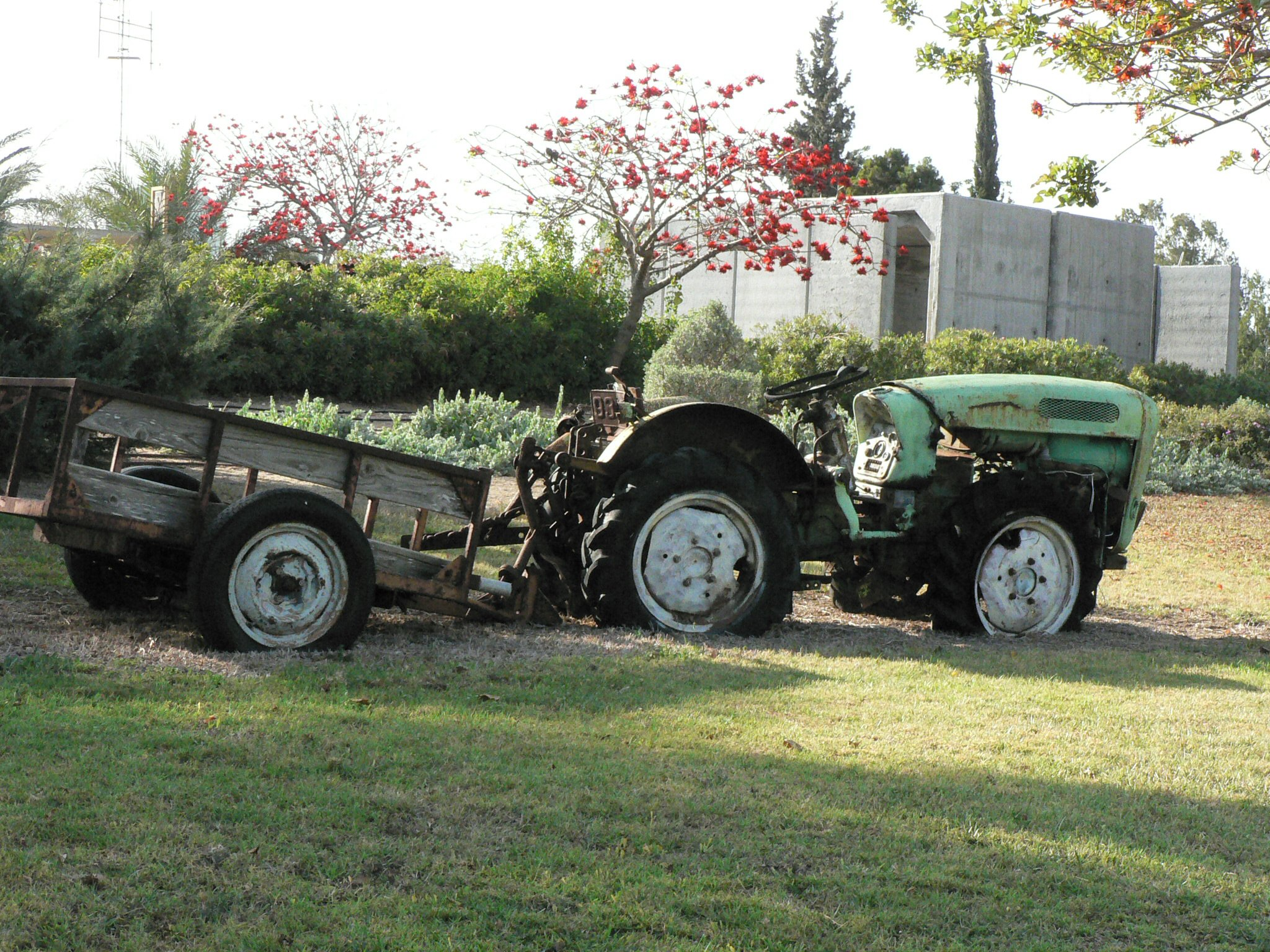
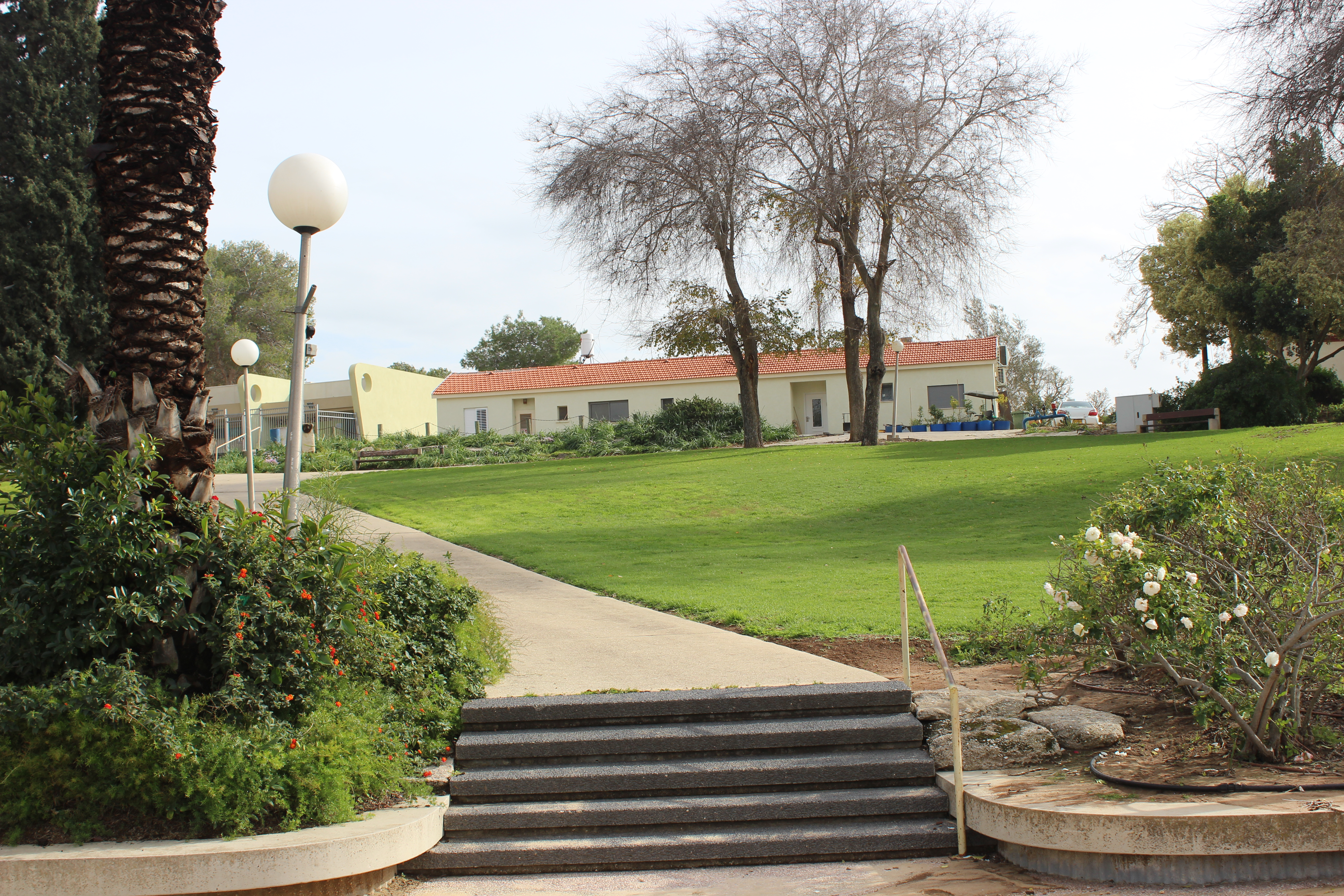
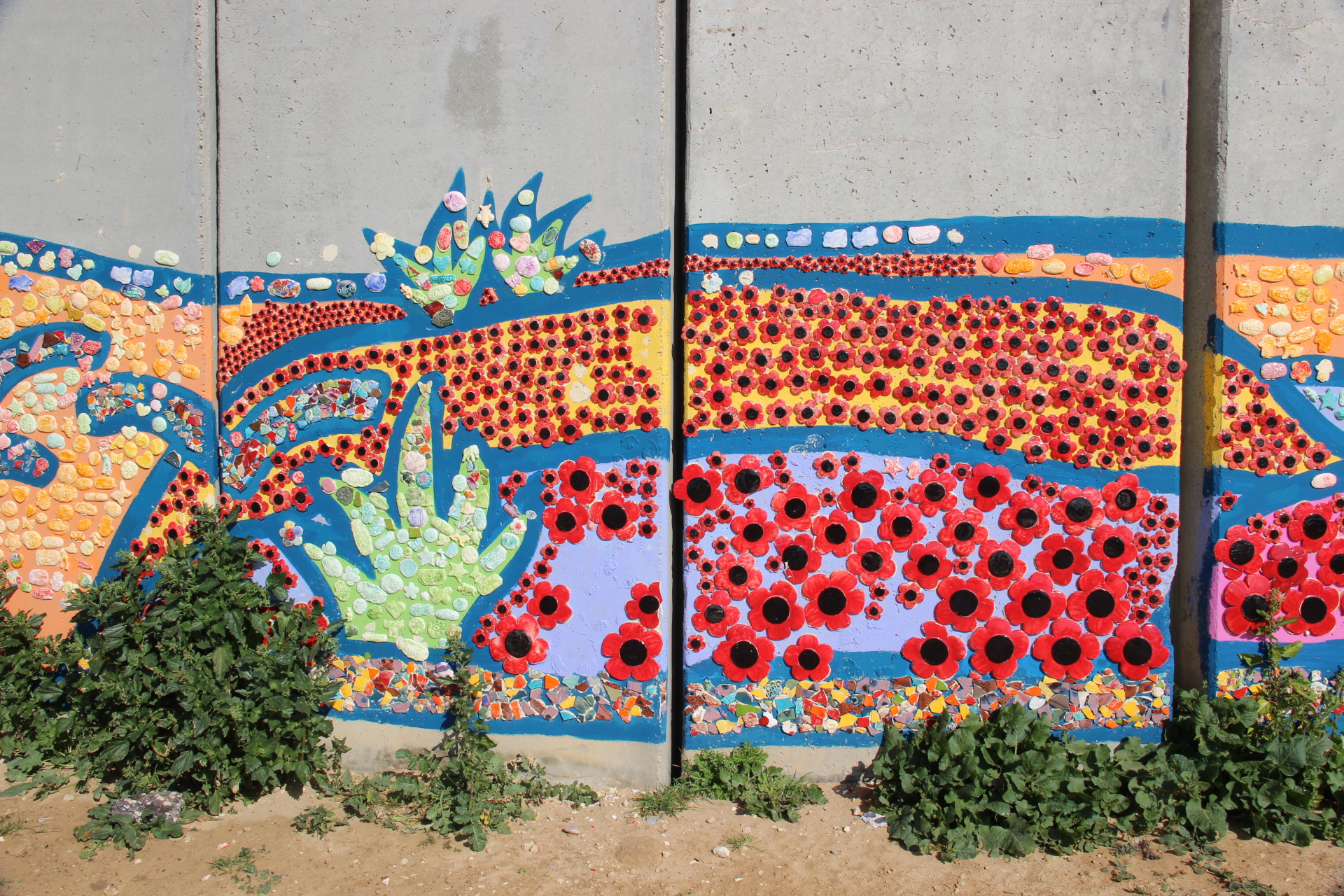
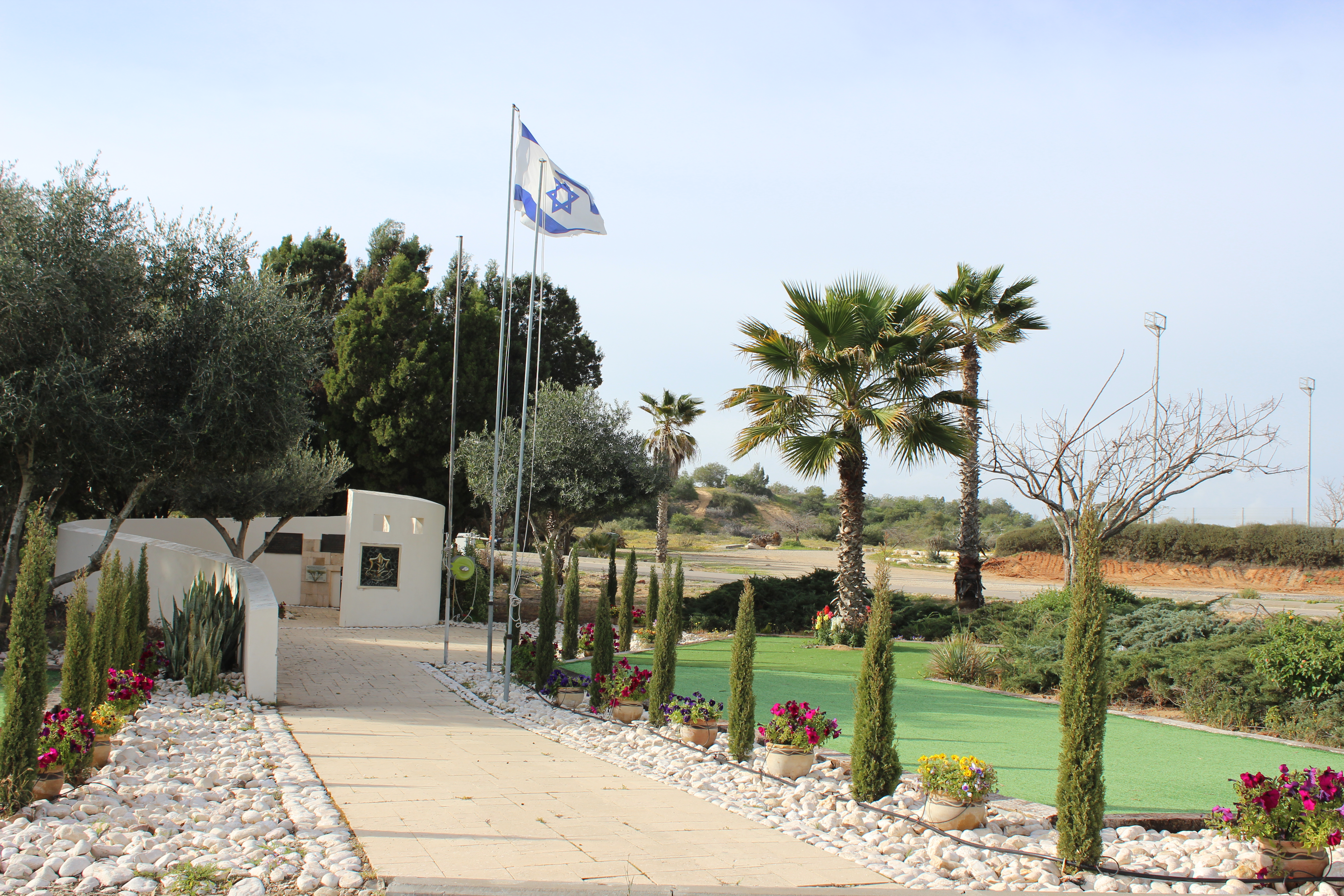
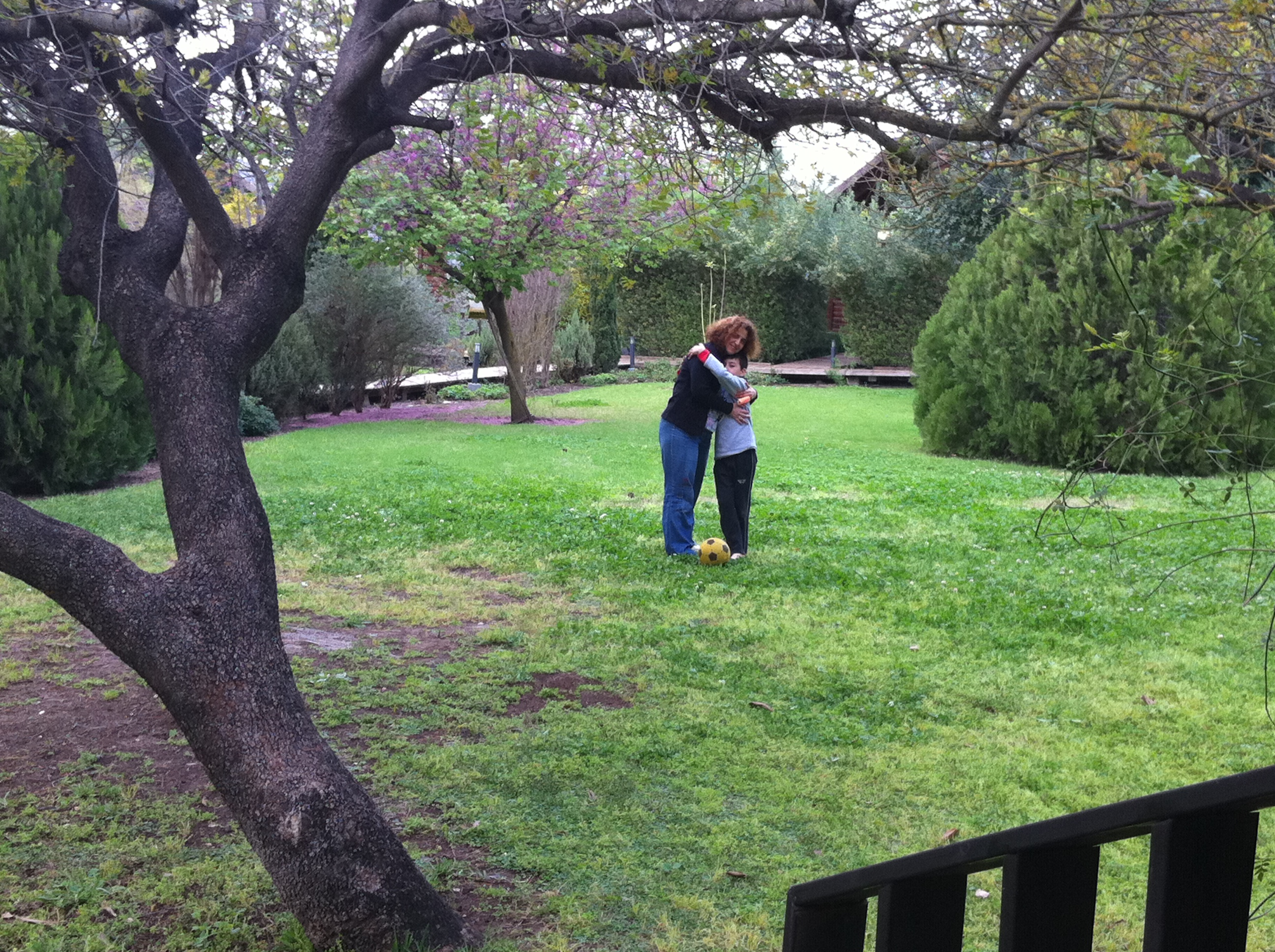
- Etymology: Path of the Ten
- Location within Ashkelon region of Israel Location within Israel
- Coordinates: 31°34′15″N 34°32′22″E
- Country: Israel
- District: Southern
- Subdistrict: Ashkelon
- Council: Hof Ashkelon
- Affiliation: Moshavim Movement
- Founded: 1982
- Founder: Netiv HaAsara (Sinai) residents
- Population (2024): 1,254
- Website: www.netiv-10.co.il

Netiv HaAsara (Hebrew: נְתִיב הָעֲשָׂרָה, lit. 'Path of the Ten') is a moshav in southern Israel. Located in the north-west Negev, just at the northern border with the Gaza Strip, it falls under the jurisdiction of Hof Ashkelon Regional Council. In 2024 it had a population of 1,254.

During the October 7 attacks, the moshav was the site of a massacre in which 20 residents were killed by Hamas. After the attack, most of the moshav was displaced.

== History ==
The moshav was founded in 1982 by 70 families who were residents of the former Israeli settlement of Netiv HaAsara in the Sinai Peninsula, which was evacuated as a result of the Camp David Accords. The original moshav had previously been named Minyan for ten soldiers who were killed in a helicopter accident south of Rafah in 1971.

After the Israeli disengagement from Gaza in 2005, Netiv HaAsara became the closest community in Israel to the Gaza Strip, located 400 meters away from the edge of the Palestinian town of Beit Lahia. At the southern edge of the village, a car park was converted into an Israel Defense Forces base and tanks were deployed. An electric fence was erected to stop infiltration attempts from Gaza, and three concrete walls were built against potential Palestinian snipers.

The moshav was a target of Qassam rockets, Katyusha rockets, and mortar shellings, In 2007, the Popular Resistance Committees sent two guerrillas to infiltrate the moshav, but they were killed by the IDF.

Dana Galkowicz, a 22-year-old Israeli-Brazilian woman, was killed on 14 July 2005 by a Qassam rocket. On 10 January 2007, a nine-year-old school girl was killed. On 10 March 2010, a Thai worker was killed.

On 25 August 2007, Palestinian militants from the Popular Resistance Committees and Democratic Front for the Liberation of Palestine attempted to enter Netiv HaAsara from Gaza, using a ladder to scale the Israel-Gaza border. Two militants were killed by the Israel Defense Forces.

In the October 7 attacks, twenty of the moshav's residents were killed in a massacre. Since then, most residents have been displaced; as of October 2024, only about 100 people lived there.

== Tourism ==
In the 2010s Netiv HaAsara became an increasingly popular tourist attraction among foreign visitors despite the threat of rocket attacks from neighboring Gaza. An observation platform designed by architect Zvi Pasternak - expected to open in spring 2018 - will enable visitors to see Gaza City to the south and Ashkelon to the north.

The Path to Peace wall mosaic art project and educational center is located on the border between Gaza and Israel at Netiv HaAsara.
