= Nir Am =

Kibbutz in southern Israel

Nir Am: ניר עם (Hebrew)
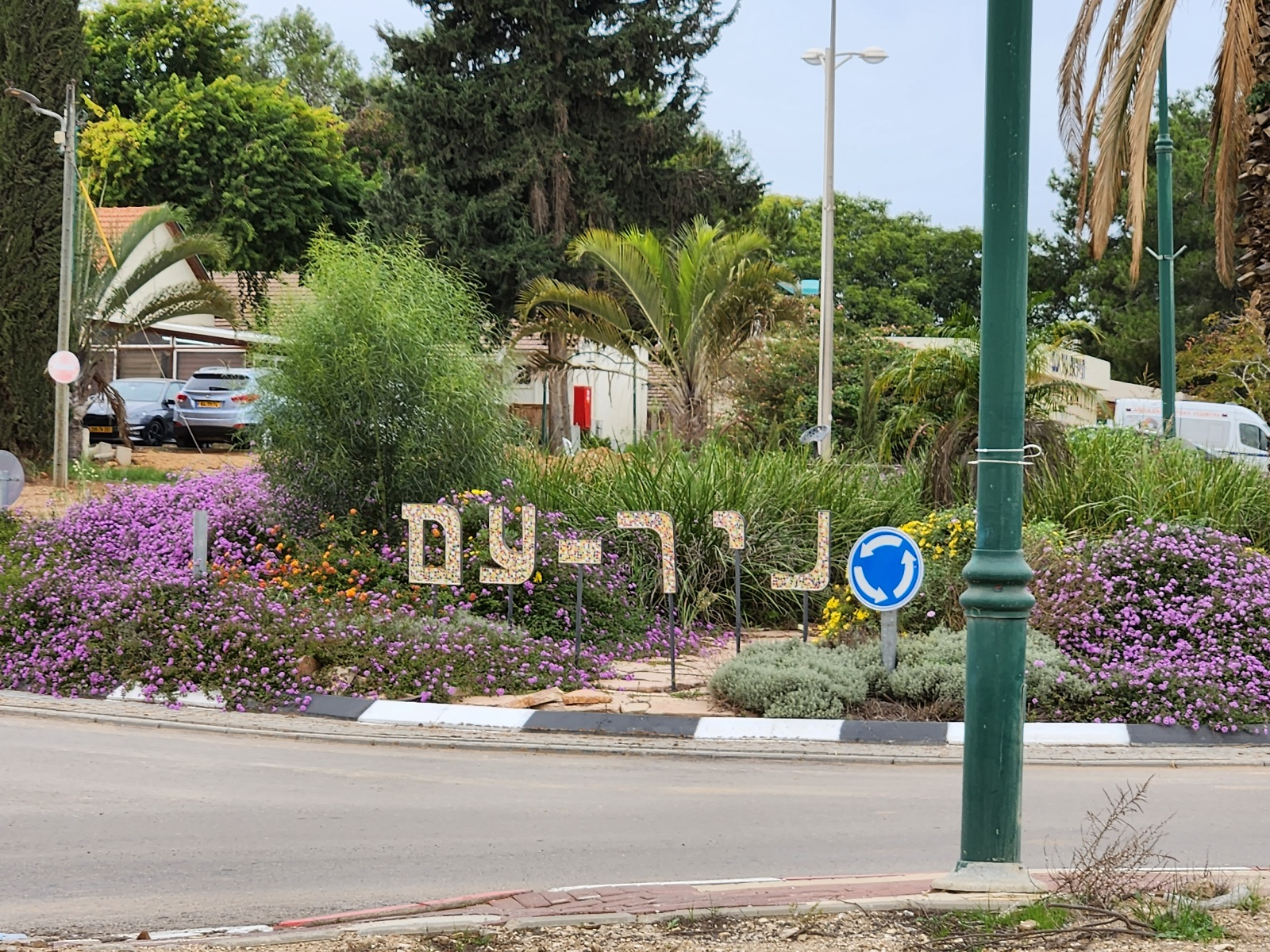
- Etymology: Nation Meadow
- Location within Northwest Negev region of Israel Location within Israel
- Coordinates: 31°31′10″N 34°34′51″E
- Country: Israel
- District: Southern
- Subdistrict: Ashkelon
- Council: Sha'ar HaNegev
- Affiliation: Kibbutz Movement
- Founded: 19 August 1943
- Founder: Bessarabian Gordonia members
- Area: 20,000 dunams (20 km^{2}; 7.7 sq mi)
- Population (2024): 733
  - Density: 37/km^{2} (95/sq mi)
- Website: www.nir-am.org.il

Nir Am (Hebrew: ניר עם, lit. 'Nation Meadow') is a kibbutz in southern Israel. Located next to the city of Sderot and around two kilometres from the Gaza Strip, the kibbutz covers 20,000 dunams. It falls under the jurisdiction of Sha'ar HaNegev Regional Council. In 2024 it had a population of 733.

== History ==
Nir Am was established on 19 August 1943 by immigrants from Bessarabia who were members of the Gordonia youth movement, including Zvi Guershoni, later a member of the Knesset. Over the years the kibbutz has also absorbed immigrants from Argentina, France and South Africa. During the 1948 war it was the headquarters of the Negev Brigade. In a report written in March 1948 by Yaakov Riftin investigating abuses in Haganah and Palmach units, it emerged that an Arab was seized, tortured and killed.

During the October 7 attacks, Nir Am was one of few villages near Gaza that avoided casualties due to the quick action of its security team, which managed to repel attacks by Hamas gunmen. The team was led by Inbal Rabin-Lieberman, the village's security coordinator who planned the defense, and included a retired Israeli special forces soldier living in the village.

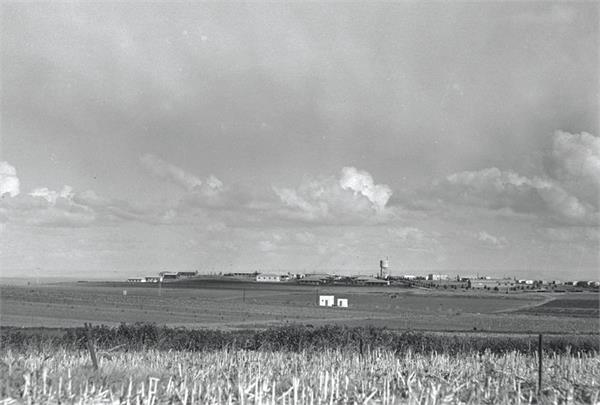
Nir Am 1947

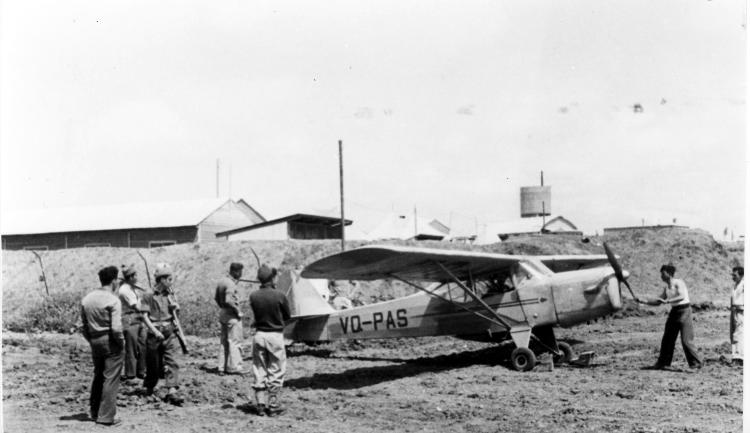
Palmach Pilots at Nir Am, 1948

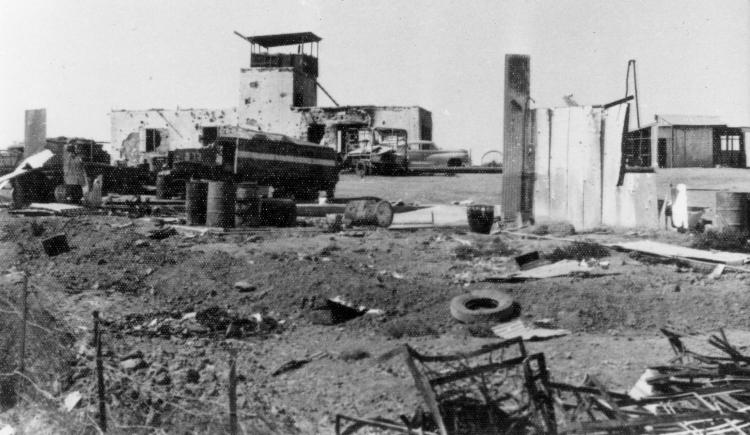
Nir Am after fighting in 1948

== Economy, culture and landmarks ==
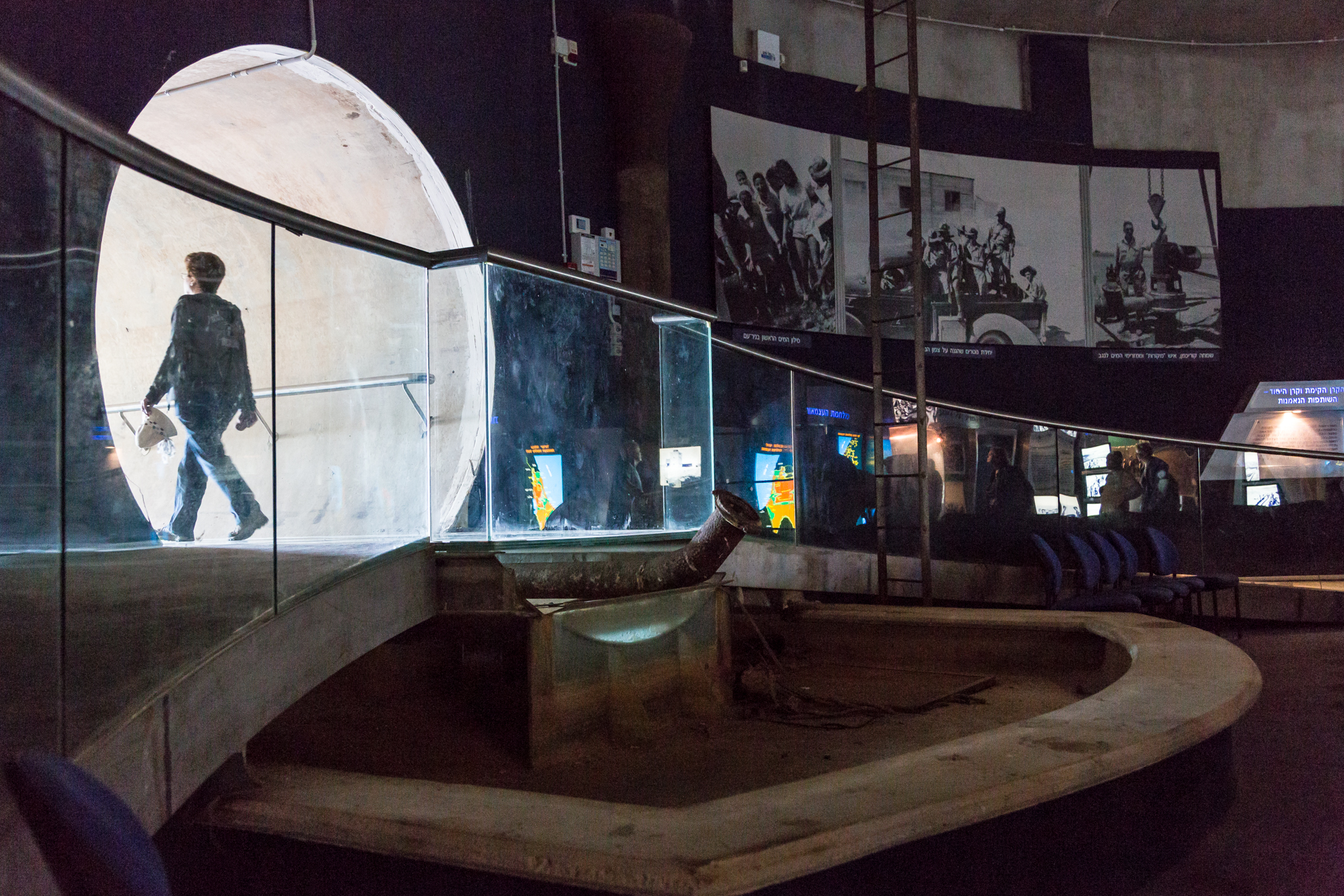
Museum of Water and Security in the Negev

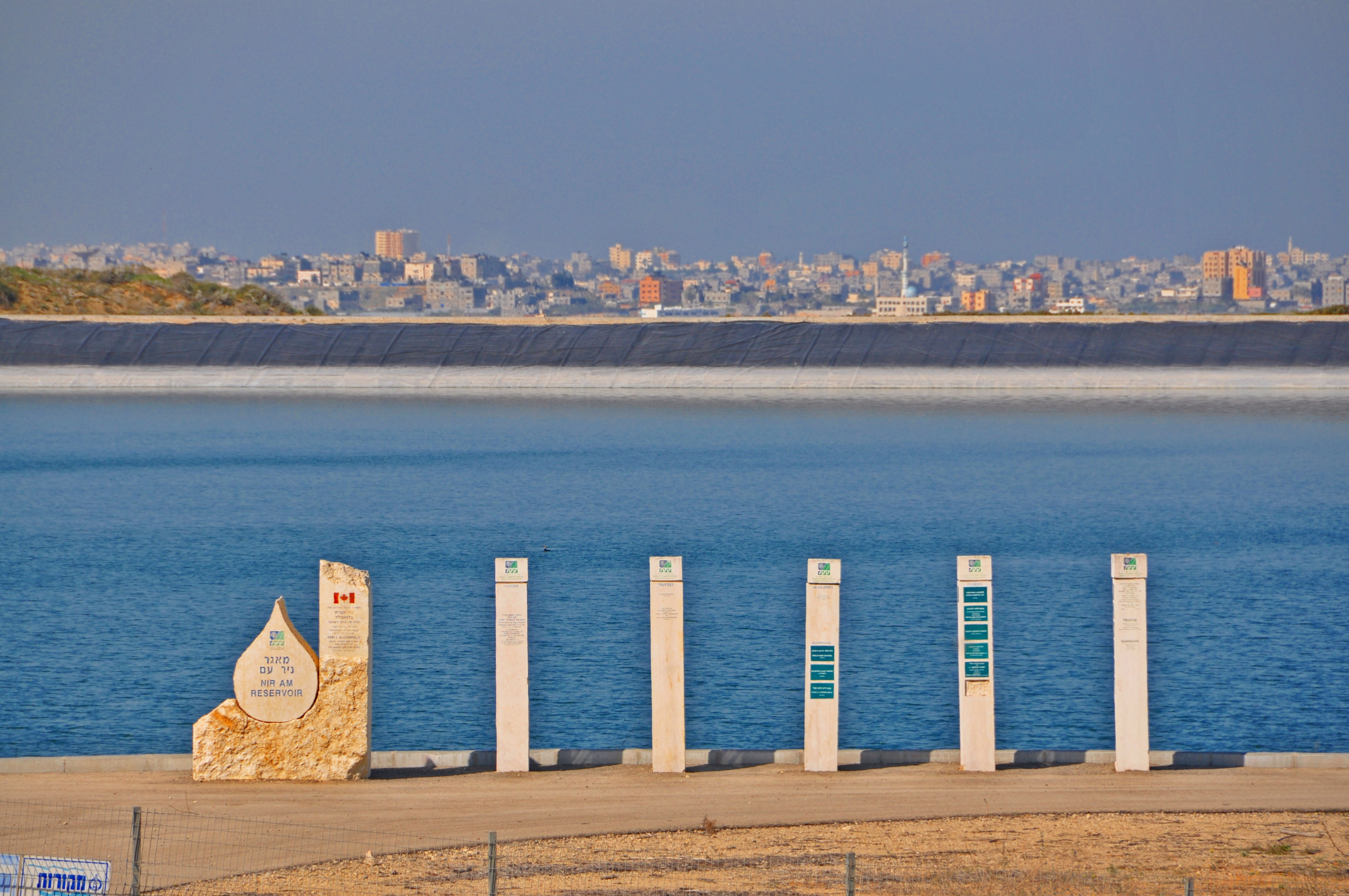
Nir Am Reservoir, with the town of Beit Hanun in the Gaza Strip in the background

An innovative work area was created in kibbutz Nir Am (Incubator), Offices and workplaces for rent to start-ups, small companies in high-tech activities).

The Museum of Water and Security in the Negev is located at Nir Am, next to Mekorot's Nir Am reservoir.

The Assaf Siboni Scenic Lookout and memorial, at a vantage point near the Nir Am Reservoir, offers excellent views of the Gaza Strip and especially of Jabalia.

== Notable people ==
- Zvi Guershoni (1915–1976), politician, co-founder of the kibbutz in 1943
- Baruch Kamin (1914–1988), politician, member of the Knesset for Mapai (1953–55)
- Adam Neumann (born 1979), Israeli-American businessman, co-founder of WeWork
- Inbal Rabin-Lieberman (born 1998), security coordinator
- Maoz Inon (born 1975), Israeli entrepreneur and peace activist
