= Amir Abulafia =

IDF reserve officer

- אמיר אבולעפיה
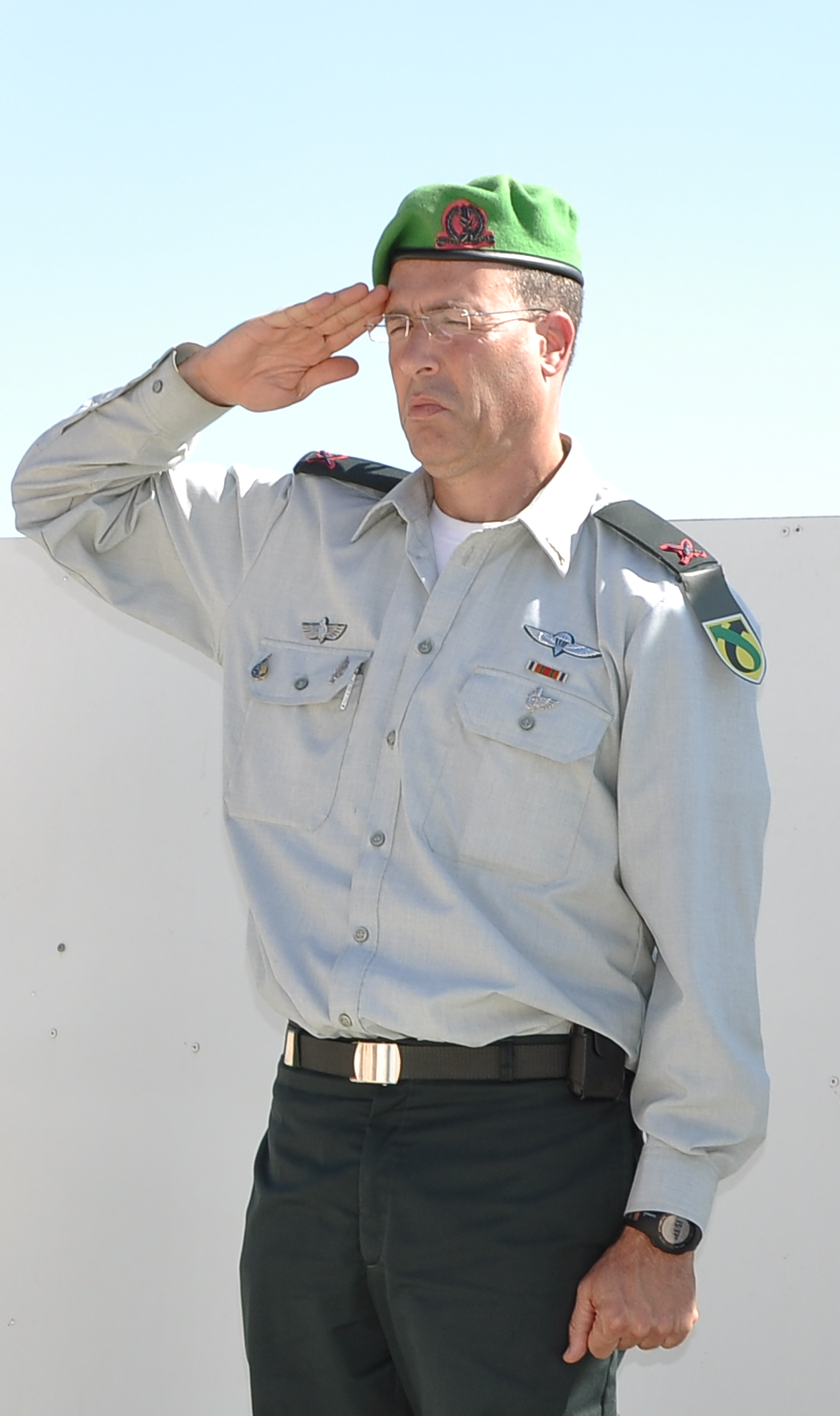
- Born: 13 May 1968 (age 58); Israel
- Military career
- Allegiance: Israel
- Branch: Israel Defense Forces
- Service years: 1986–2020
- Rank: Aluf (major general)
- Conflicts: South Lebanon conflict (1985–2000); First Intifada; Second Intifada; 2006 Lebanon War; Operation Cast Lead; Operation Pillar of Defense; Operation Protective Edge; Operation Guardian of the Walls

Amir Abulafia (Hebrew: אמיר אבולעפיה; born May 13, 1968) is an IDF reserve officer with the rank of Aluf (Major General). He served as Head of the Planning Directorate, Commander of the Steel Formation, Head of the Planning Division in the Planning Directorate, Commander of the Idan Formation and Commander of the Nahal Brigade.

== Biography ==
Abulafia grew up in Tiberias and was educated in Bat Yam. He is a graduate of the electronics department at the "Ort Melton" school in Bat Yam. During his high school years, he was active in the student council.

=== Military service ===
Abulafia was drafted into the IDF in September 1986, and was assigned to Battalion 950 (later Battalion 50) in the Nahal Brigade. He underwent infantry combat training, an infantry NCO course and an infantry officers course. Upon completing the course he returned to the brigade and served as a platoon commander in Battalion 50. In November 1990 he was appointed company commander in Battalion 50. In 1992 he served as company commander in Bahad 1. Later he was appointed commander of the Nahal Brigade recon unit between 1993 and 1995, and led it in fighting in southern Lebanon and against Palestinian terrorist organizations during the First Intifada. He then served as the IDF attaché in Washington. After studies at the Command and Staff College, he was promoted to Lieutenant Colonel and appointed commander of Battalion 906 between 2000 and 2002. He then established the Nahal Brigade recon battalion, and served as its commander between 2002 and 2004.

In 2004 he was promoted to Colonel and appointed Commander of the Shaldag Special Forces Unit, serving in this position until 2006. On May 4, 2006, he was appointed Commander of the Binyamin Brigade, leading it in fighting Palestinian terrorism. During this role he commanded the arrest operation of Ibrahim Hamed, a Hamas terrorist operative. He served in this position until May 2008. Subsequently, he served as Head of Operations at the Operations Directorate between 2008 and 2010. On March 19, 2010, he was appointed Commander of the Nahal Brigade. After the Carmel fire he mobilized his soldiers for the rehabilitation efforts of the Carmel ridge. On March 14, 2012, he completed his role as brigade commander.

On April 17, 2012, he was promoted to Brigadier General and appointed Commander of the Idan Formation, serving until August 13, 2014. Concurrently he served as Commander of the company and battalion commanders course between 2012 and 2013. In 2014 he was appointed Head of the Depth Corps headquarters, serving until 2015. In 2015 he was appointed Head of the Planning Department in the Planning Directorate, a role he filled until 2016. On June 2, 2016, he was appointed Commander of the Steel Formation, serving until June 13, 2017. On June 29, 2017, he was promoted to Major General, and on July 2 assumed office as Head of the Planning Directorate, serving until June 21, 2020. On October 12, 2020, he went on leave from the IDF prior to discharge.

In 2022 he was appointed by Defense Minister Benny Gantz to head the selection committee for the next commander of Army Radio.

== Personal life ==
Aviv-Abulafia resides in Modi'in, is married and has three children. He is a graduate of the National Security College and holds a master's degree in political science from the University of Haifa.
