= Yitzhak Ben-Bashat =

Israeli IDF officer (1979–2023)

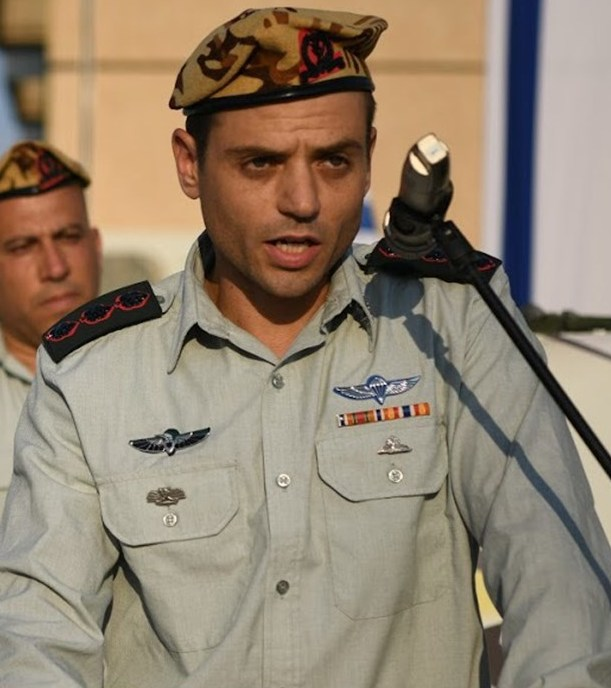
- Ben-Bashat in 2018
- Native name: עלי יצחק בן בשט
- Nickname: Benba
- Born: 1979
- Died: 12 December 2023 (aged 44) Shujaiyya, Gaza Strip, Palestine
- Allegiance: Israel
- Branch: Israel Defense Forces
- Service years: 2001–2023
- Rank: Aluf Mishne (Colonel)
- Conflicts: 2006 Lebanon War; Gaza War (2008-2009); 2012 Gaza War; 2014 Gaza War; 2021 Israel-Palestine crisis; Gaza war †
- Spouse: Adar
- Children: 4

Eli Yitzhak Ben-Bashat (Hebrew: עלי יצחק בן בשט; 1979 – 12 December 2023) was an Israel Defense Forces (IDF) officer with the rank of Colonel. He served as the commander of the Yiftach Brigade, the commander of the Paran Brigade, a team commander at the Tactical Command College, and the commander of the Golani Reconnaissance Battalion.

On 12 December 2023 he was killed in the Gaza war. He, along with Asaf Hamami, Roi Levy and Yonatan Steinberg are the most senior IDF officers killed in the war.

== Career ==
Ben-Bashat grew up in Neve Tzuf. He enlisted in the IDF, was placed in the Golani Brigade, and was accepted into the Egoz unit. He underwent training as a fighter, completed an infantry commanders course, and an infantry officers course. After finishing the course, he returned to the Egoz unit and was appointed a team commander. Later, he served as the commander of a support company in Battalion 51. Subsequently, he served in the Sayeret Shaldag unit and held several command positions. He was then appointed the deputy commander of the Egoz unit and served in this role during the 2014 Gaza War. During the war, he temporarily replaced the unit commander, Yonatan Rom, following his injury.

In January 2015, he was promoted to the rank of Colonel and appointed commander of the Golani Reconnaissance Battalion, a position he held until 22 June 2016. Afterwards, he served as a team commander at the Tactical Command College between 2016 and 2018. On 22 August 2018, he was promoted to the rank of Lieutenant Colonel and appointed commander of the Sagi Brigade. During his tenure, on 28 November 2018, the brigade was disbanded and replaced under his command with the Paran Brigade. He served in this role until 18 August 2020. Subsequently, he was appointed a team commander in the company and battalion commanders' course between 2020 and 2021. On 8 August 2021, he was appointed the commander of the Yiftach Brigade, a position he held until September 2023.

== Death ==
Ben-Bashat was among 10 Israeli soldiers killed 12 December 2023 in an ambush by Palestinian fighters in Shuja'iyya. He was survived by a wife, Adar, and four children.

== See also ==
- Asaf Hamami
- Roi Levy
- Yonatan Steinberg
