= Asaf Hamami =

Israeli military officer (1982–2023)

- אסף חממי
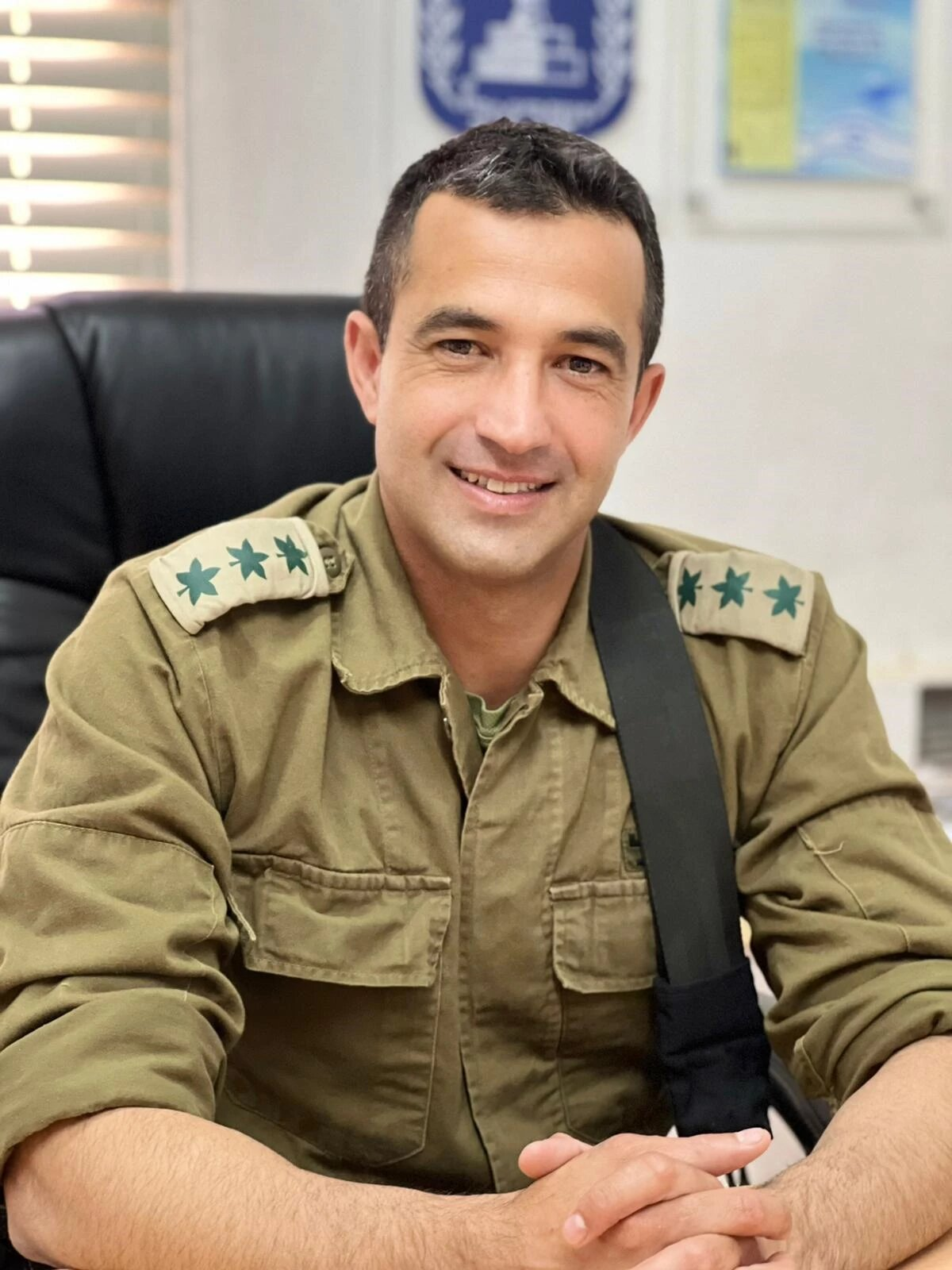
- Born: December 2, 1982; Israel
- Died: October 7, 2023 (aged 40)
- Military career
- Allegiance: Israel
- Branch: Israel Defense Forces
- Service years: 2001–2023
- Rank: Aluf Mishne (colonel)
- Conflicts: 2006 Lebanon War; Gaza War (2008-2009); 2012 Gaza War; 2014 Gaza War; 2021 Israel-Palestine crisis; Gaza war †

Asaf Hamami (Hebrew: אסף חממי; December 2, 1982 – October 7, 2023) was an IDF officer with the rank of colonel, serving as the commander of the Southern Brigade in the Gaza Strip. Prior to that, he served as the commander of the Negev Brigade, commander of the Oz Brigade training school, and commander of the Tzabar Battalion.

On October 7, 2023, during the battles of the Hamas-led attack on Israel, he was killed defending kibbutz Nirim. His body was taken to Gaza by Hamas militants. Along with Roi Levy, Yonatan Steinberg and Yitzhak Ben-Bashat, they are the most senior officers killed in the IDF in this war.

== Biography ==
Hamami enlisted in the IDF in 2001, was placed in the Givati Brigade and accepted into the Givati Reconnaissance Battalion. He underwent training as a fighter, an infantry commanders' course, and an infantry officers' course. Upon completing the course, he returned to the Reconnaissance Battalion and was appointed a team commander. Later, he served as the commander of the training company in the Givati Brigade. He was then appointed the commander of the support company in the Rotem Battalion. In April 2010, he received the Chief of Staff's Citation from Gabi Ashkenazi. He later served in command positions in the Maglan Unit. In 2012, he was appointed the commander of the Rimon Unit, and served in this position until 2013. He was then appointed the deputy commander of the Shaked Battalion.

In 2015, he was promoted to the rank of Colonel and appointed the deputy commander of the Northern Brigade in the Gaza Strip, serving in this position until 2016. On September 30, 2016, he was appointed the commander of the Tzabar Battalion, a position he held until August 27, 2018. He established the Oz Battalion and commanded it from 2018 to 2020. In July 2020, he was promoted to the rank of Lieutenant Colonel and appointed the commander of the Negev Brigade, serving in this position until May 9, 2022. On May 29, 2022, he was appointed the commander of the Southern Brigade in the Gaza Strip.

He was killed during the Nirim attack on October 7, 2023, and his body was kidnapped to Gaza by the Hamas militants. A funeral proceeding for Hamami was performed without his body. The funeral was attended by thousands, including senior military officers and the Israeli Defense Minister, Yoav Gallant.

Hamami's 6-year-old son, who was present during the attack, was hidden by Hamami's soldiers in one of the rooms at the base along with his father. Only about 10 hours after the attack began was the child taken from the base and returned to his mother.

On 2 November 2025, Hamami's remains were handed over by Hamas militants to Israel.

== Personal life ==
Hamami was married and a father of three. He held a Bachelor's and master's degree in Political Science and Security from the University of Haifa. He lived in Kiryat Ono.

== See also ==
- Roi Levy
- Yonatan Steinberg
- Nirim attack
- Gaza war hostage crisis
