= Roi Levy =

Israeli Defense Force colonel (1979–2023)

- רועי לוי
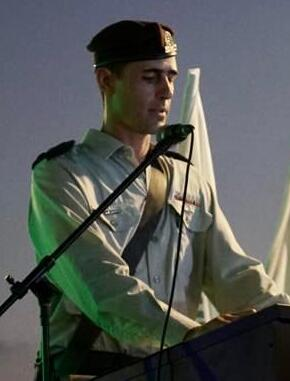
- Levy in 2020
- Born: Roi Yosef Levy; 29 May 1979
- Died: 7 October 2023 (aged 44); Israel
- Military career
- Allegiance: Israel
- Branch: Israel Defense Forces
- Commands: Multidimensional Unit
- Conflicts: Gaza war: Battle of Re'im †

Roi Yosef Levy (Hebrew: רועי לוי; 29 May 1979 – 7 October 2023) was an officer in the Israel Defense Forces (IDF) with the rank of colonel who served in his last position as commander of the Multidimensional Unit. He had previously served as commander of the Fire Training Center in Melah, commander of the Bar'am Brigade, commander of the Unit 621 – 'Egoz', commander of the Hadar Battalion and commander of the 1st 'Golani' Brigade. He was killed in the battle of Re'im during an encounter with Palestinian militants during the Gaza war.

== Biography ==
Levy was born in the United States and grew up in Jerusalem. He studied at the Yeshiva High School in Beit El and the Ateret Yerushalayim Yeshiva. He enlisted in the IDF in March 1999, was assigned to the 1st Brigade and was accepted into the Golani reconnaissance platoon. After training, he served as a fighter in the reconnaissance platoon and took part in fighting in southern Lebanon.

Upon completing the course, he returned to the reconnaissance platoon and was appointed team leader. Later he was appointed commander of a team of fighters and fought among other things in Operation Defensive Shield. Later he served as commander of the training platoon in the Golani Brigade. After that, he was appointed commander of Rifle Company A in Battalion 51. Later he served as operations officer of the Golani Brigade during the Second Lebanon War. After that, he was appointed commander of the Golani Reconnaissance Platoon between 2006 and 2007.

Later he served as commander of the Golani Brigade between 2007 and 2008. During his tenure, he commanded many operations, including Operation Precedent Decision. The purpose of the operation was to strike a mortar squad located in the Saja'iyya area which was very disruptive. The reconnaissance company under his command and simultaneously the Golani Reconnaissance Platoon flanked from both sides. At the end of the operation, six terrorists were killed.

At the beginning of Operation Cast Lead he interrupted his studies and joined the fighting as part of the Golani Brigade, during which he was wounded in the leg during an encounter with terrorists. After completing his studies he was appointed deputy commander of Battalion 12 and served in that position between 2011 and 2012.

In June 2013 he was promoted to Lieutenant Colonel and appointed commander of the Golani Brigade, and led it among other things in fighting in Operation Protective Edge, during which he was seriously wounded in the head. Due to his injury, he ended his tenure in the battalion. After a rehabilitation period in which he also completed a master's degree in law at Bar-Ilan University, he was appointed commander of the Hadar Battalion at Bahad 1 and served in that position between 2015 and 2016. On 16 May 2016, he was appointed commander of the Egoz Unit in the Oz Brigade. In April 2018 he was selected by the Chief of Staff, Gadi Eisenkot, to light the IDF torch on the 70th Independence Day of the State of Israel. Later, the unit under his command received the Chief of Staff Prize for Excellence. He completed his role on 3 May 2018. On 27 June 2018, he was promoted to Colonel and appointed commander of the Bar'am Brigade and led the brigade among other things in Operation Northern Shield. He served in this role until 27 August 2020. Upon completion of his tenure, he was a student at the National Security College in Class 48 (2020–2021).

In 2021 he was appointed commander of the Fire Training Center in Melah, a position in which he served until 2023. On 30 July 2023, he was appointed commander of the Multidimensional Unit. He was killed on 7 October in the battle of Re'im during an encounter with Palestinian militants on the first day of the Gaza war.

== Personal life ==
Levy was married to Yael and was a father of five.

== See also ==
- Asaf Hamami
- Yonatan Steinberg
- Battle of Re'im
- Re'im music festival massacre
- Gaza war hostage crisis
