= Battle of Re'im =

2023 battle between Israel and Hamas

- Part of the October 7 attacks and the Gaza war
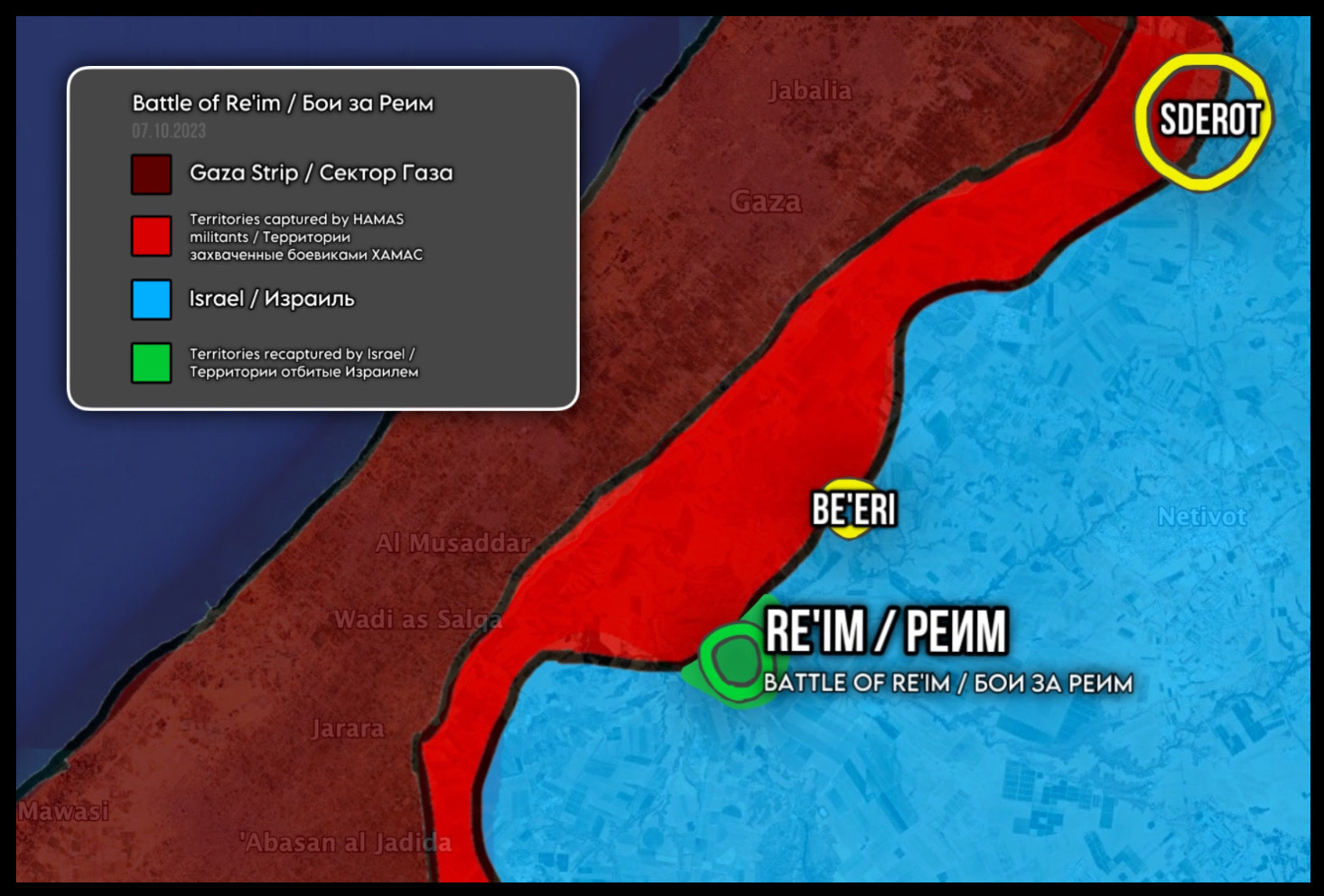
- Map of the Battle of Re'im
Date	7 October 2023
Location	Re'im, Southern District, Israel
Result	Hamas initially captures Re'im from Israel; Israel regains control of Re'im

Belligerents
Hamas	Israel

Commanders and leaders
Unknown	Nimrod Aloni; Roi Levy †; Sahar Makhlouf † (Israel) Itzik Buzukashvili †

Units involved
Al-Qassam Brigades	Israel Defense Forces; Israeli Ground Forces; Gaza Division; Multidimensional Unit; Israeli Air Force; Israel Police

Casualties and losses
Unknown	Unknown

The battle of Re'im (Hebrew: קרב רעים; Arabic: معركة رعيم) took place on October 7, 2023, when Hamas attacked Israel, initiating the Gaza war. At 10:00 am, less than five hours after Hamas attacked, fighting was reported outside of the Re'im Army Base, which is headquarters for the Gaza Division.

The base was reportedly the location of IDF drone and surveillance operations. Hamas reportedly posted a video of dead Israeli soldiers it had killed at the base. Later in the day, Israeli Defense Forces (IDF) regained control of the military base.

== See also ==
- Roi Levy, one of the deaths during the battle
- Re'im music festival massacre, a massacre that took place nearby
- Timeline of the Israeli–Palestinian conflict in 2023
- Timeline of the Gaza war (7 October 2023 – 27 October 2023)
- Outline of the Gaza war
