= 162nd Division (Israel) =

Armoured division of the Israel Defense Forces

162nd Ha-Plada Division
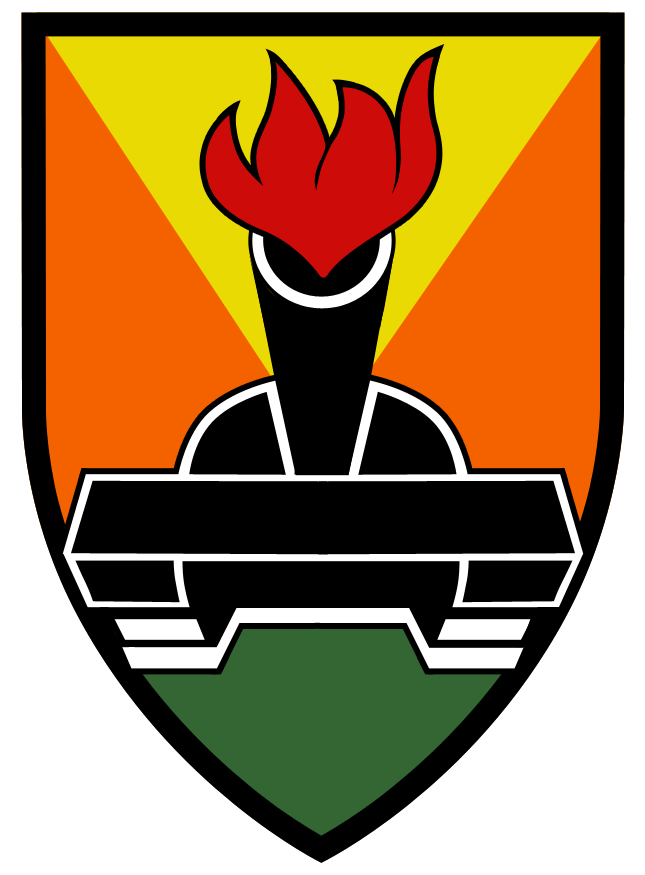
- 162nd Division insignia
- Active: 1971–present
- Country: Israel
- Allegiance: Israel Defense Forces
- Branch: Armored Corps
- Type: Armor
- Size: Division
- Part of: Southern Command
- Engagements: Yom Kippur War; 1982 Lebanon War; 2006 Lebanon War; 2014 Gaza War; Gaza war

The 162nd Division "Ha-Plada", also known as the Steel Formation (Hebrew: עֻצְבַּת הַפְּלָדָה, Utzbat HaPlada), is a division in the Israel Defense Forces. It is subordinate to Southern Command.

The 162nd division has been involved in the Yom Kippur War, the two Lebanon wars, and the Gaza war. During the lattermost war, it was determined to have killed Hind Rajab, a 5-year old Palestinian girl.

== History ==
The division played a critical role in the 1973 Yom Kippur War in the Sinai, under Avraham "Bren" Adan.

Although attached to the Central Command at the time, the 162nd Division participated in battles against Hezbollah, from July to August 2006, in the western sector of southern Lebanon and north of Bint Jbeil. The division reached the strategic Litani River, that separates Hezbollah-controlled Lebanon from central Lebanon. The division participated in skirmishes with Hezbollah as late as September 27.

=== Gaza war ===
On February 17, 2025, the Israel Defense Forces announced that the 162nd Division had officially concluded its nearly 15-month-long operations in the Gaza Strip. Responsibility for the military's buffer zone in the northern part of the Strip was handed over to the 252nd Division. According to the IDF, the 162nd Division suffered the loss of 265 soldiers during the Israeli invasion of the Gaza Strip. The southern portion of the buffer zone, as well as the Philadelphi Corridor along the Egypt-Gaza border, remains under the responsibility of the Gaza Division.

A UN commission concluded that the 162nd division deliberately targeted and killed medical workers during the Gaza war. UN experts "determined on reasonable grounds" that it was the 162nd division that killed Hind Rajab, a 5-year old Palestinian girl. The 162nd division, according to the report, also killed the rest of the girl's family and two paramedics trying to rescue the girl.

== Division organization ==
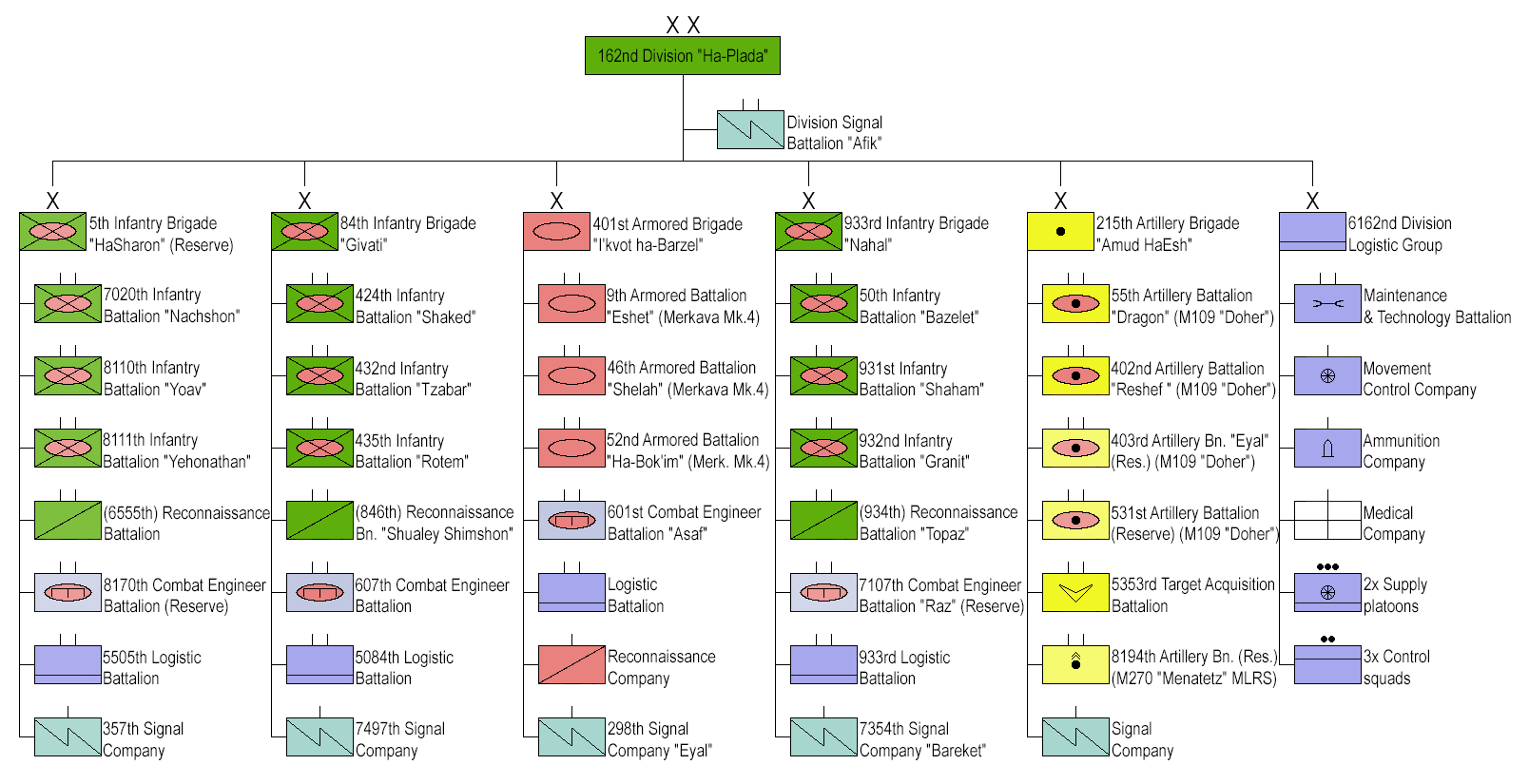
162nd Division "HaPlada" organization as of November 2026

- 162nd Division "HaPlada" ("Steel")
  - 5th Infantry Brigade "HaSharon" (Reserve)
    - 7020th Infantry Battalion "Nachshon"
    - 8110th Infantry Battalion "Yoav"
    - 8111th Infantry Battalion "Yehonathan"
    - (6555th) Reconnaissance Battalion
    - 8170th Combat Engineering Battalion (Reserve)
    - 5505th Logistic Battalion
    - 357th Signal Company
  - 84th Infantry Brigade "Givati"
    - 424th Infantry Battalion "Shaked"
    - 432nd Infantry Battalion "Tzabar"
    - 435th Infantry Battalion "Rotem"
    - (846th) Reconnaissance Battalion "Shualey Shimshon" ("Samson's Foxes")
    - 607th Combat Engineering Battalion
    - 5084th Logistic Battalion
    - 7497th Signal Company
  - 401st Armored Brigade "I'kvot haBarzel" ("Iron Trails")
    - 9th Armored Battalion "Eshet"
    - 46th Armored Battalion "Shelah"
    - 52nd Armored Battalion "HaBok'im" ("The Breachers")
    - 601st Combat Engineering Battalion "Asaf"
    - Logistic Battalion
    - Reconnaissance Company
    - 298th Signal Company "Eyal"
  - 933rd Infantry Brigade "Nahal"
    - 50th Infantry Battalion "Bazelet" (Basalt)
    - 931st Infantry Battalion "Šoham" (Onyx)
    - 932nd Infantry Battalion "Granit"
    - (934th) Patrol Battalion "Topaz"
    - 935th Reconnaissance-Strike Battalion "Nofekh" (activated October 2026)
    - 7107th Combat Engineer Battalion "Raz" (Reserve)
    - 933rd Logistics Battalion
    - 7354th Signals Company "Palhik" (Agate)
  - 215th Artillery Brigade "Amud HaEsh" ("Pillar of Fire")
    - 55th Artillery Battalion "Dragon" (M109 "Doher" self-propelled howitzers)
    - 402nd Artillery Battalion "Reshef" (M109 "Doher" self-propelled howitzers)
    - 403rd Artillery Battalion "Eyal" (Reserve) (M109 "Doher" self-propelled howitzers)
    - 531st Artillery Battalion (Reserve) (M109 "Doher" self-propelled howitzers)
    - 5353rd Target Acquisition Battalion
    - 8194th Artillery Battalion (Reserve) (M270 "Menatetz" MLRS)
    - Signal Company
  - 6162nd Division Logistic Group
    - Maintenance & Technology Battalion
      - Maintenance Company A
      - Maintenance Company B
      - Assistance Company
    - Movement Control Company
    - Ammunition Company
    - Medical Company
    - 2x Supply platoons
    - 3x Control squads
  - Division Signal Battalion "Afik"
  - 888th Multidimensional Unit "Refaim" ("Ghost")
