= Refaim Unit =

Israeli Special Operations task force

Multidimensional Unit / Unit 888
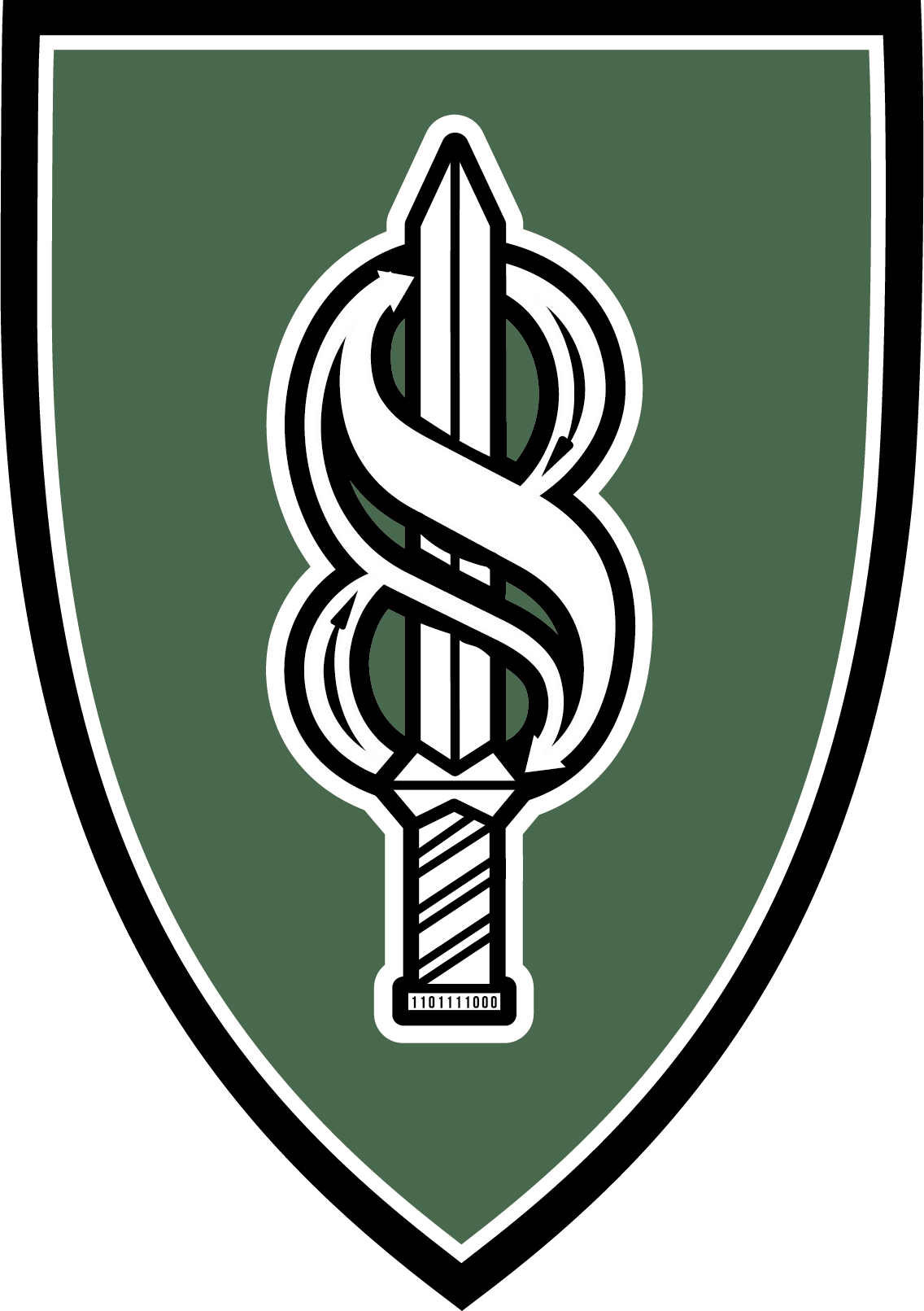
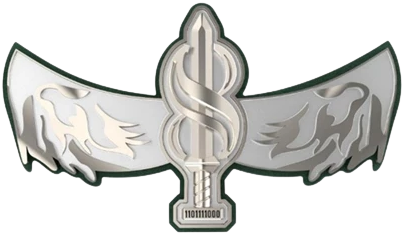
- Unit 888 Insignia
- Active: 2019–present
- Country: Israel
- Allegiance: Israel Defense Forces
- Branch: Israeli Ground Forces
- Type: Combined Arms Special Forces
- Role: Direct action Intelligence gathering Tactical development Testing military technology
- Size: Battalion
- Part of: Maneuvering Corps; GOC Army Headquarters
- Nickname: "Refaim" (Ghosts)
- Mottos: “But he knoweth not that the dead are there; and that her guests are in the depths of hell.” Proverbs 9:18
- Engagements: Operation Guardian of the Walls; Operation Breaking Dawn; Gaza war; Surprise attack on the western Negev; Battle of Re'im; First Battle of Jabalia; Third Battle of Jabalia; Twelve-Day War

Commanders
- Current commander: Colonel Tal Ashure
- Notable commanders: Colonel Roi Levy

The Multidimensional Unit, also known as Unit 888 or the “Refaim” Unit (Hebrew: יחידת רפאים, lit. 'Ghost Unit'), is an Israel Defense Forces (IDF) Special Operations task force operating under the Ground Forces. Established in 2019 by IDF chief of staff Aviv Kochavi as part of the "Momentum" program, the unit aims to develop multi-domain operations tactics and adapt to evolving threats and battlefield conditions. It integrates multiple warfare domains—including infantry, engineering, anti-tank warfare, aerial warfare, and intelligence collection—and serves as a testing ground for new military technologies.

== Historical context and establishment ==
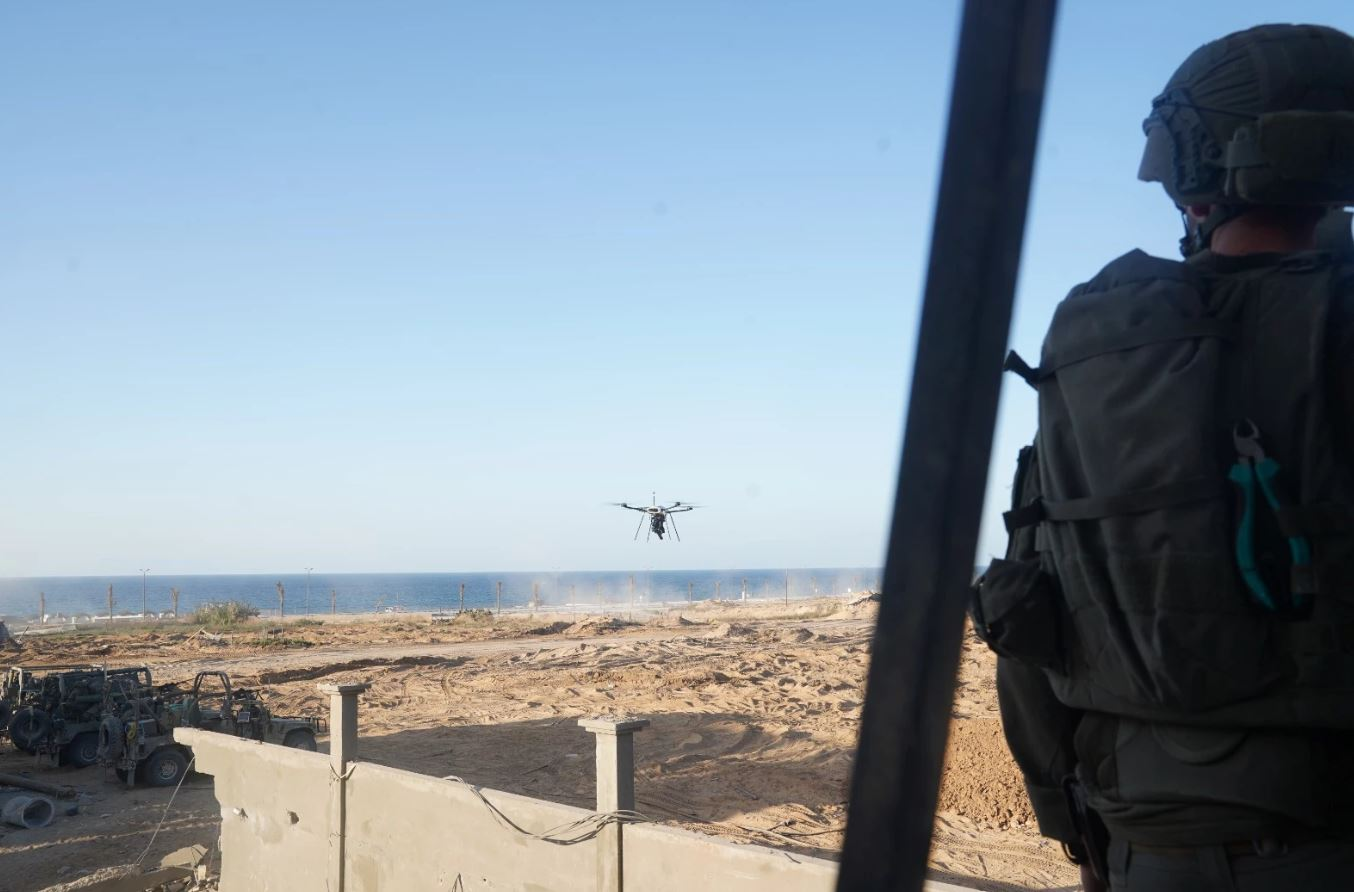
Drone of the Multidimensional Unit

The Multidimensional Unit was established in 2019 under the IDF's "Momentum" program (known as "Tnufa" in Hebrew), a multi-year initiative to enhance military capabilities in response to emerging threats. The unit was publicly announced on January 1, 2020. Its headquarters had been established earlier, and initial combat troops were allocated shortly before the announcement. In February 2020, the unit unveiled its insignia: a sword within the number 8, with arrows in various directions, and a pommel displaying the binary code "1101111000" (representing the decimal number - 888).

A notable event in its history occurred on October 7, 2023, when its first commander, Colonel Roi Levy, was killed during the battle of Re'im in the Gaza war. On June 24, 2025 Corporal Eitan Zacks was killed by an Iranian missile strike on his home in Be’er Sheva.

== Role and structure ==
Unit 888 is designed for versatility, combining infantry, engineering, anti-tank warfare, aerial warfare, and intelligence collection into a cohesive force. It serves as a testing ground for new warfare tactics and technologies. The unit supports the "Momentum" program's focus on the "sensor to shooter" loop, which aims to detect targets (sensors) and strike them (shooters) more quickly and effectively. This work aims to influence broader IDF strategies. While its exact structure remains classified, it reportedly draws personnel from elite units like the Nahal Brigade and Paratroopers Brigade, suggesting a composition of highly skilled soldiers. The unit is led by a colonel.

== Training ==
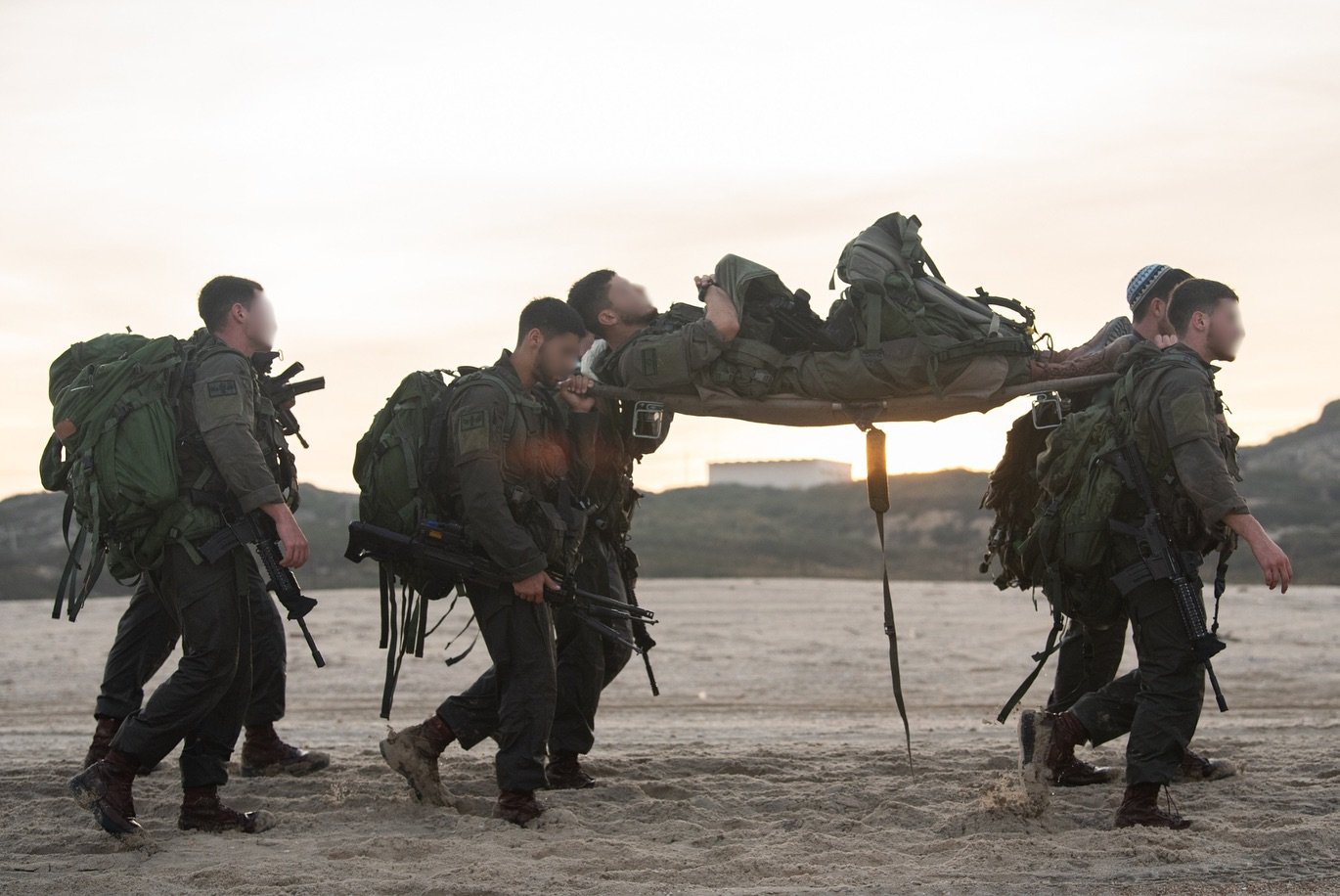
The training of November 23, 2024 soldiers from the Multidimensional Unit

Enlisted personnel selected for Unit 888 must go through a physical and mental selection process before starting training. Because of the unit's flexible nature and its mission to develop new tactics within the IDF, soldiers undergo regular special forces selection processes while also being tested for creativity and problem-solving skills. Combat training includes enduring extreme physical and mental challenges for over 14–16 months, which most trainees will not complete. Those who successfully complete training may receive additional training specializing in a specific field, and only then can go fully operational.

== Operational engagements ==
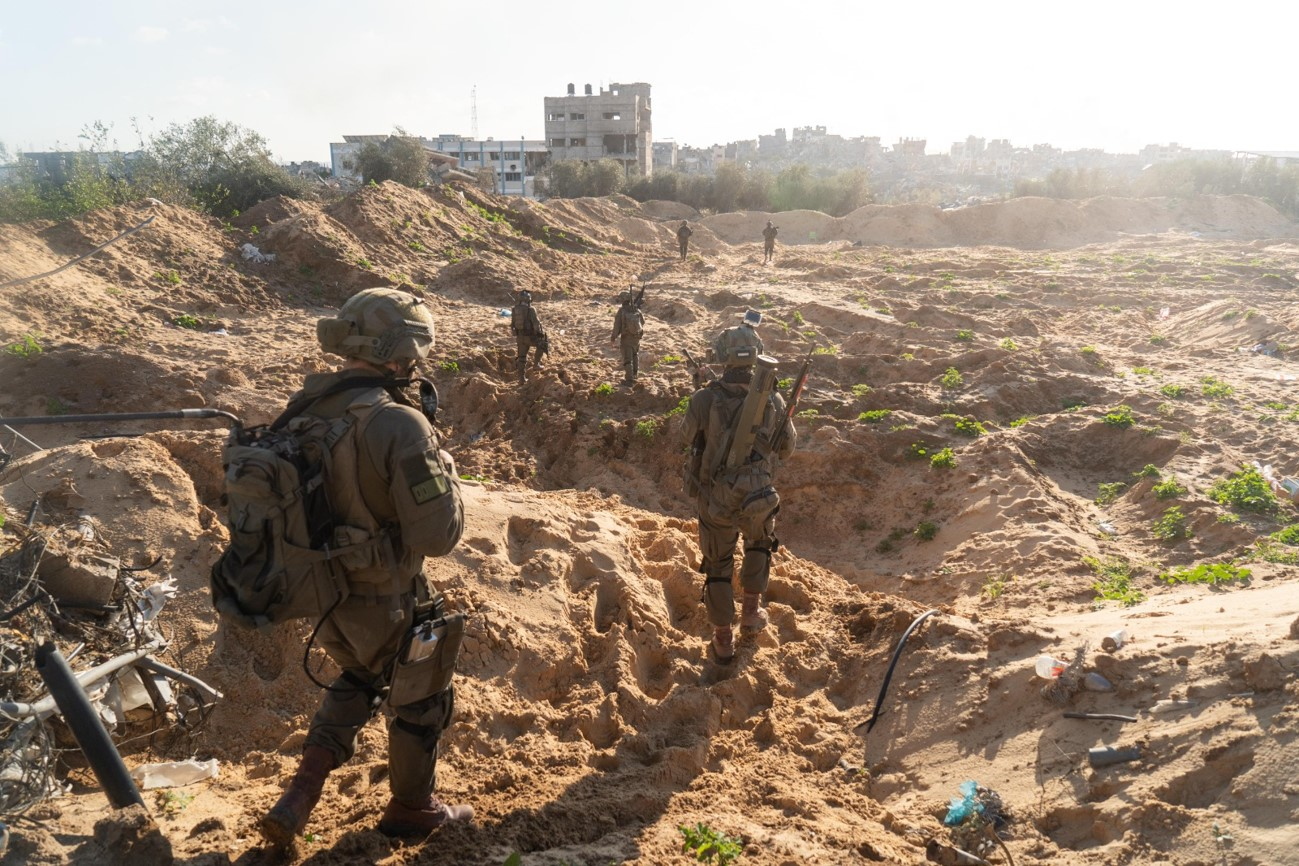
Soldier of the Multidimensional Unit maneuvering in the Gaza Strip during the Iron Swords War

The unit has been active in the Gaza war, with a significant loss on 7 October 2023, when Colonel Roi Levy was killed in the battle of Re'im. The unit saw its operational debut before the Gaza War, but during the war its operations were made public for the first time, conducting its first public ground operation in Gaza, including activity in Jabalya and northern Gaza, where it operated advanced technologies like armed drones and precision mortars.

== Gallery ==
Inauguration Ceremony, February 2020

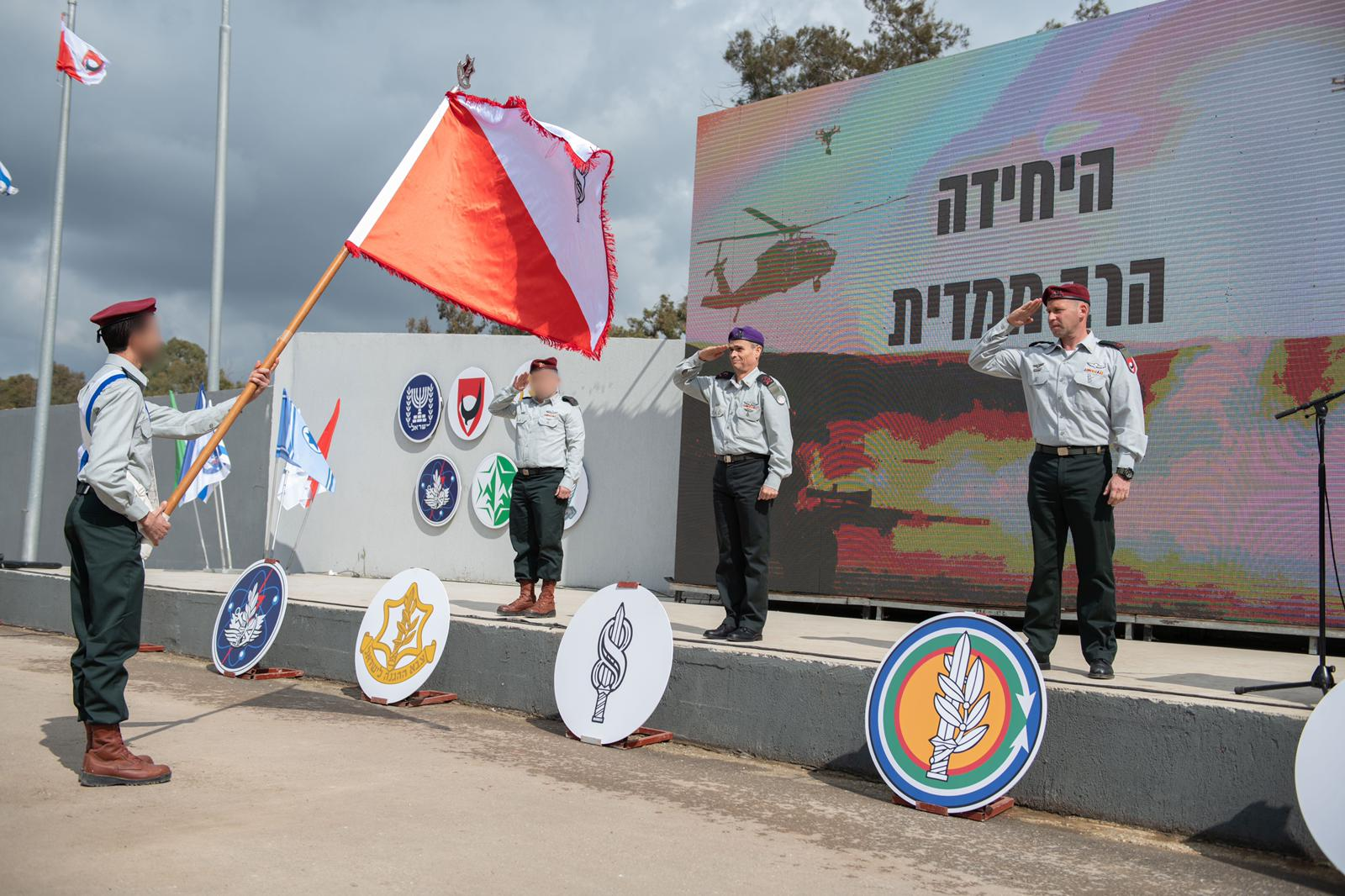

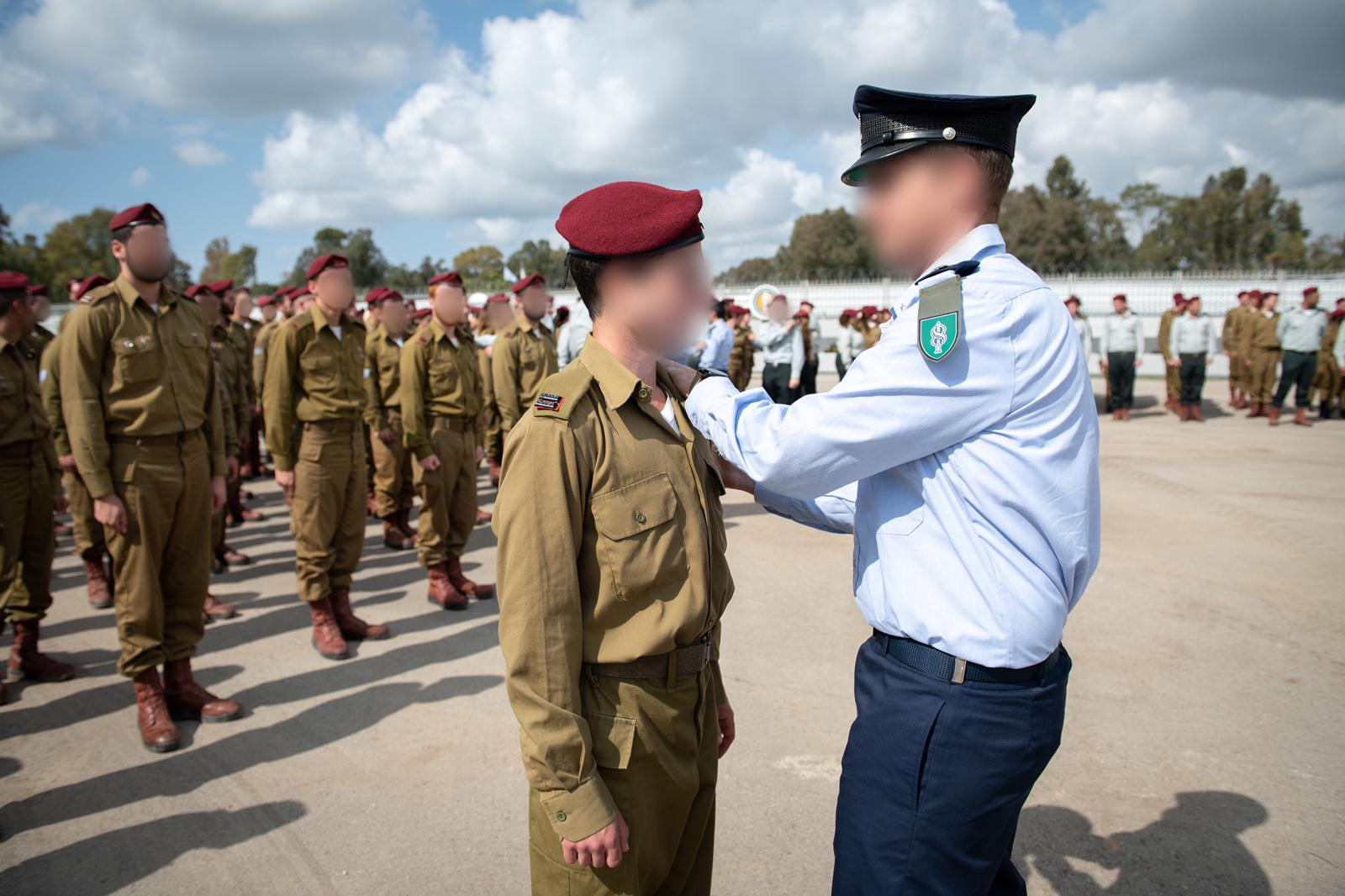

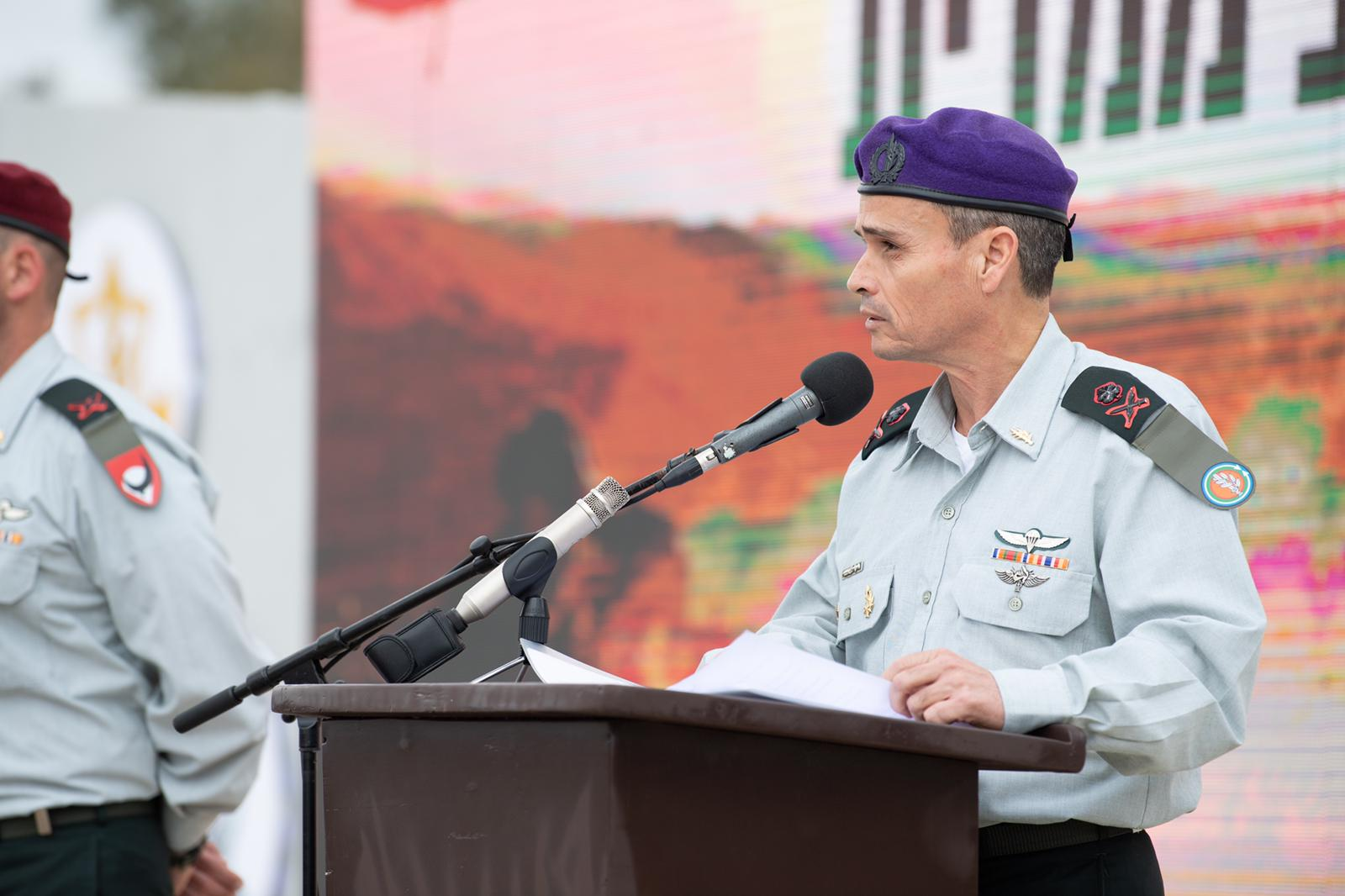

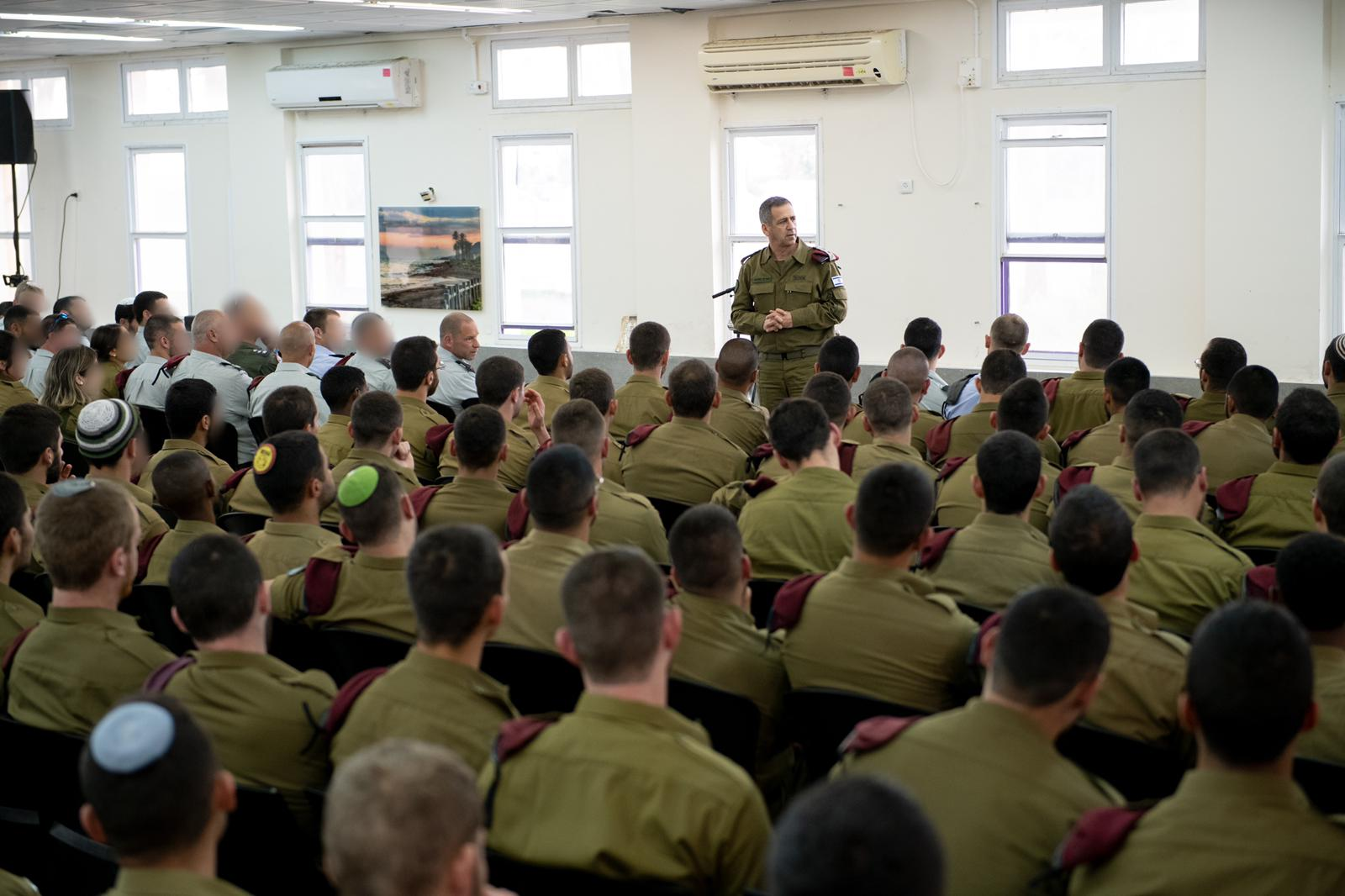
