= Granite Battalion =

932nd Nahal Infantry Battalion (“Granite”)
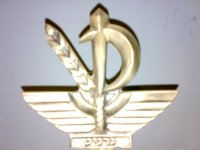
- Active: June 1976–present
- Country: Israel
- Allegiance: Israeli Defense Force
- Branch: Nachal Infantry Brigade
- Type: Battalion
- Mottos: "Granite Battalion, Tip of the Spear! גדוד גרניט ,קצה החנית
- Colors: Red and White
- Mascot: American alligator
- Engagements: Operation Peace for Galilee; Operation Defensive Shield; Second Lebanon War

Commanders
- Current commander: Battalion Commander Yoav Katzanelson

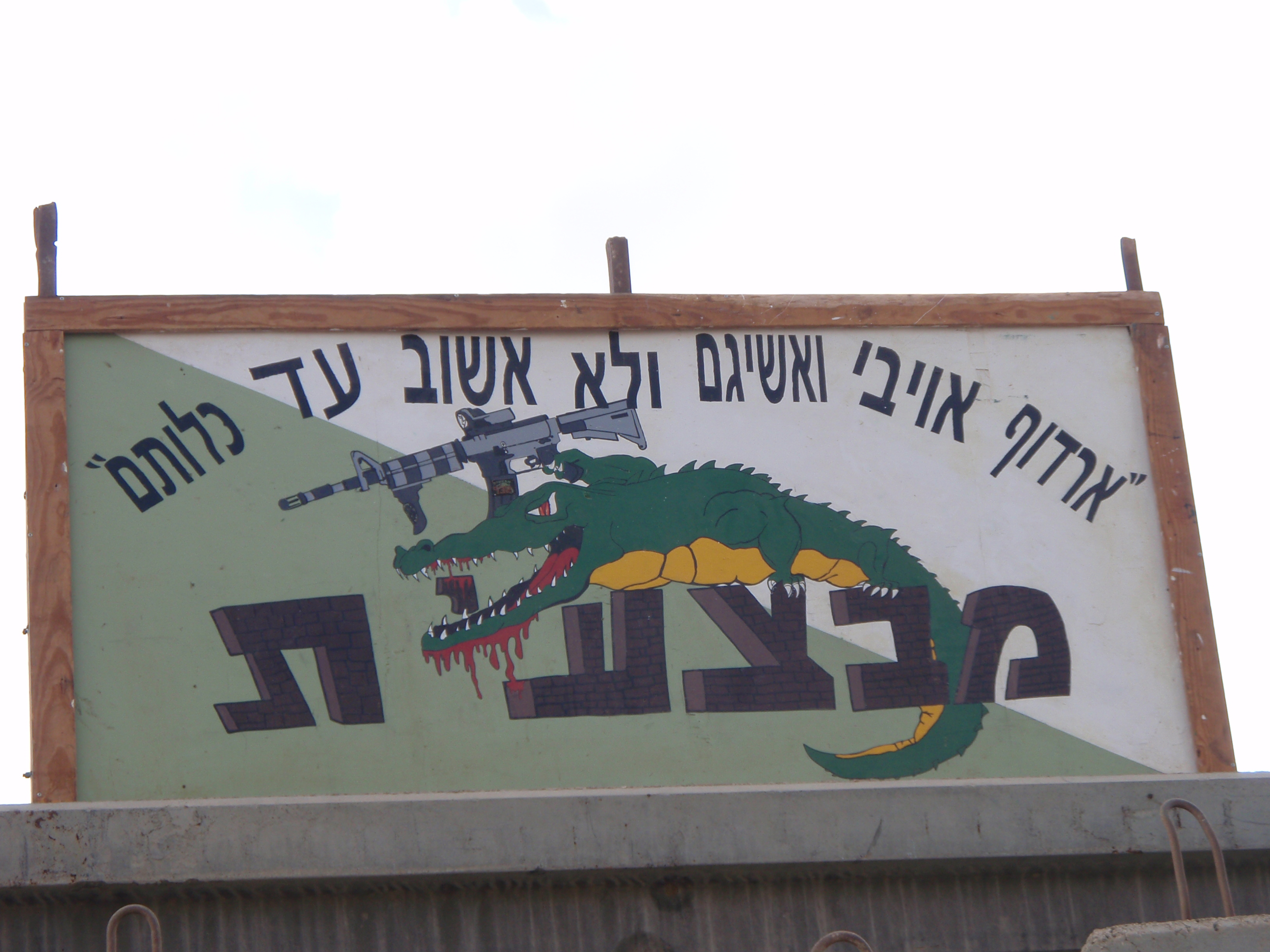
Mivtzayit Alligator Insignia

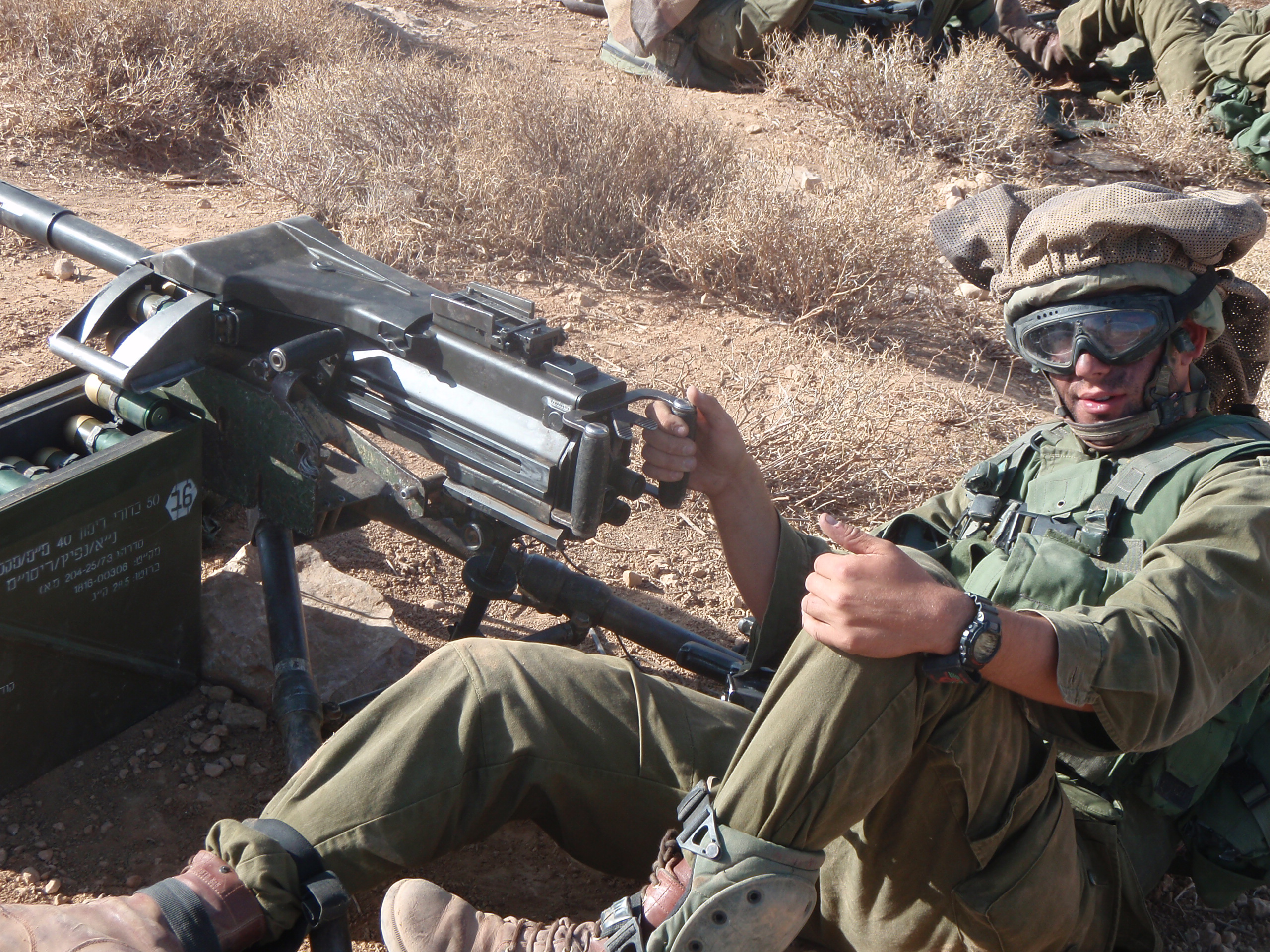
The MK-19 automatic grenade launcher, carried on the backs of IDF infantry soldiers.

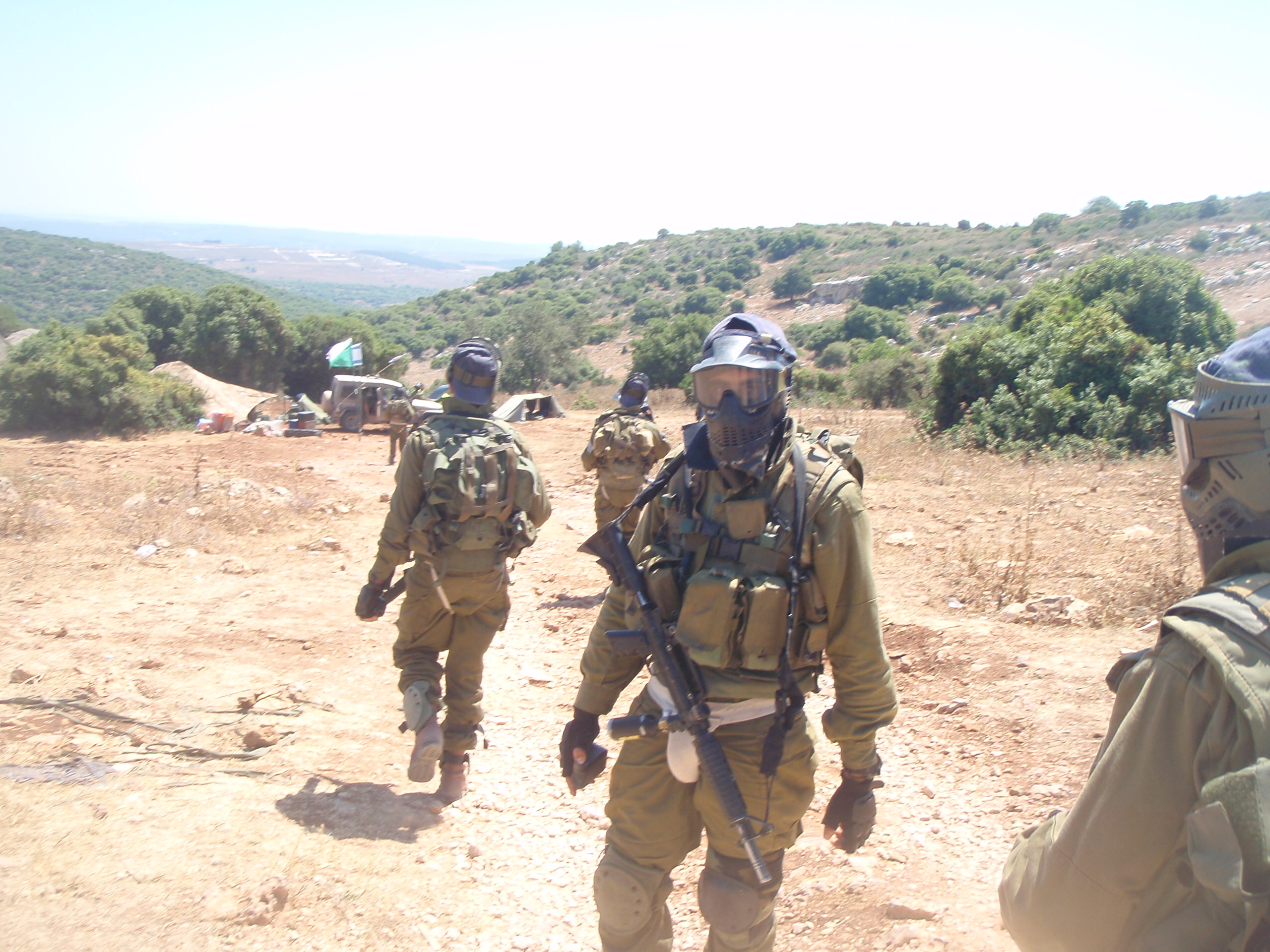
Paintball training

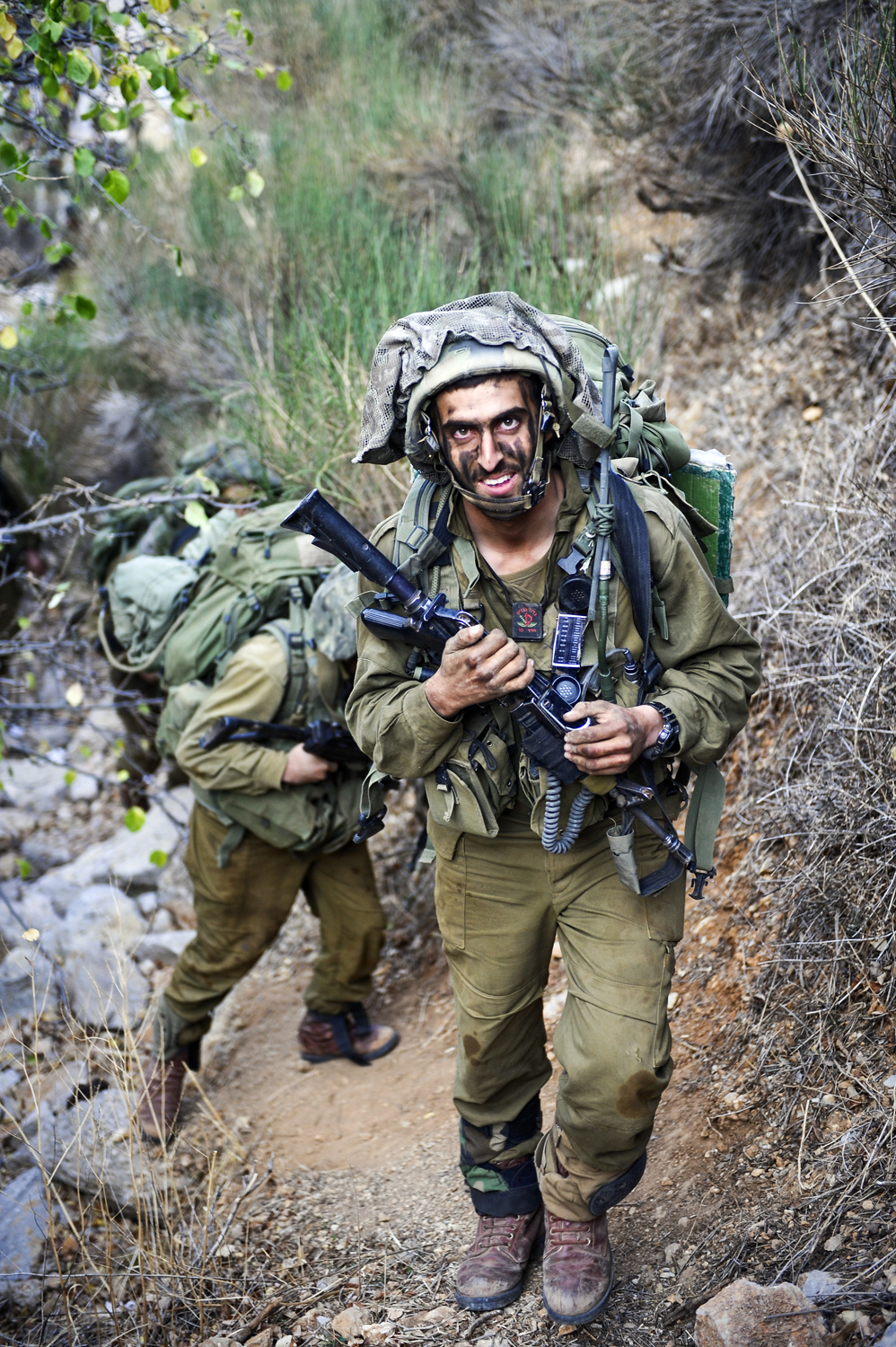
Training of Granite Battalion soldiers, Nov 2010

The 932nd "Granite" Battalion is part of the Israeli Defense Force's Nahal Brigade.

== History ==
Battalion 932 was established in June 1976 and until Operation Peace for Galilee functioned as a routine security battalion belonging to Central Command. Its main area of activity before the First Lebanon War was the northern sector of the Jordanian border with the West Bank in the Jordan Valley, replacing Sayeret Haruv which had been disbanded. It was based in Camp Gadi, next to Masua, and manned mainly by Nahal soldiers. During the First Lebanon War the battalion participated in the battle for Ein Zahlat against Syrian commandos and a Syrian armored battalion.

Until the withdrawal from Lebanon in 2000 the battalion set up multiple successful outposts and operations, including a cross-border operation, resulting in the elimination of four terrorists, nicknamed "turmeric 3."

The Granite Battalion received the Chief Of Staff (Ramatkal) Medal for its activities during Operation Defensive Shield, especially in the battle for Jenin. During the operation the battalion participated in arrests in Tulkarm, the Balata refugee camp, Nur, Nablus, the refugee camps in Ramallah and Amaary Jenin.

During the Second Lebanon War, Battalion 932 battled Hezbollah fighters in the villages of south Lebanon, including Mais al-Jabal, Rab Thalathin, Al-Qantara and the famous battle in the village of Al-Ghandouriyah in Wadi Saluki, towards the end of the war.

In Operation Cast Lead of 2008, Battalion 932 hindered a number of attacks originating from the Lebanese and Syrian borders.

In Operation Protective Edge, Battalion 932 fought in the northern Gaza Strip, combating Hamas militants and finding and destroying arms caches hidden in civilian buildings.

== Battalion organization ==
- Armored Company
  - Armored Support Platoon
  - Special Forces Platoon
- First Company
- Honor Company
- Medical Staff Company
- Reconnaissance Company
  - Aba Platoon
  - Ima Platoon
  - Sniper Platoon
- Spear Company
- Strenght Company
