= Yonatan Steinberg =

Israeli Defense Force colonel

- יהונתן שטיינברג
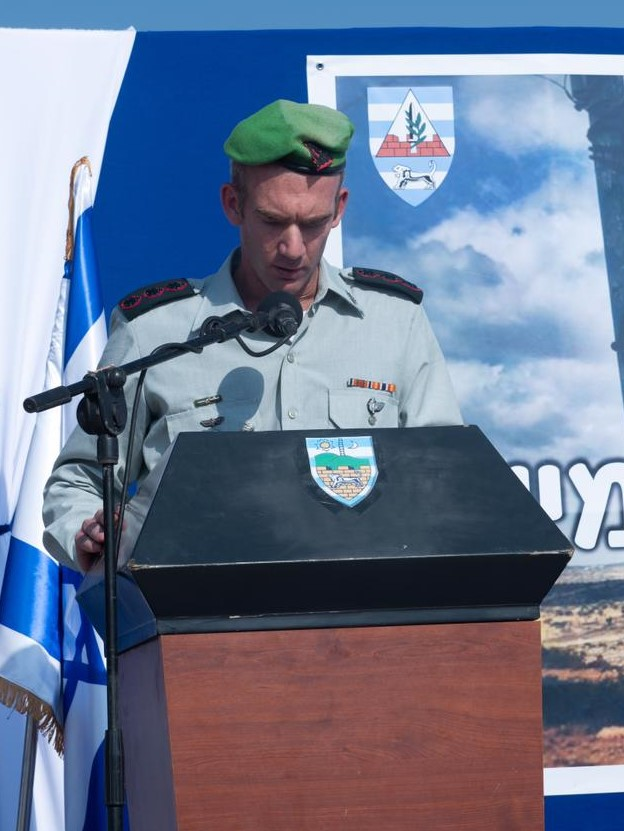
- Steinberg in 2019
- Born: 1980
- Died: 7 October 2023 (aged 42); Kerem Shalom, Israel
- Military career
- Allegiance: Israel
- Branch: Israel Defense Forces
- Commands: 933rd "Nahal" Brigade
- Conflicts: Gaza war †

Yonatan Steinberg (Hebrew: יהונתן שטיינברג; 1980 – 7 October 2023) was an officer in the Israel Defense Forces (IDF) with the rank of colonel, who served as the commander of the 933rd "Nahal" Brigade. He had previously served as the commander of the Center for Tactical Training in the IDF, the commander of the Binyamin Brigade, the Assistant Brigade Commander (Operations) of the Steel Formation, and the commander of Battalion 931. He was killed by Hamas fighters in a surprise attack on Israel in October 2023.

== Biography ==
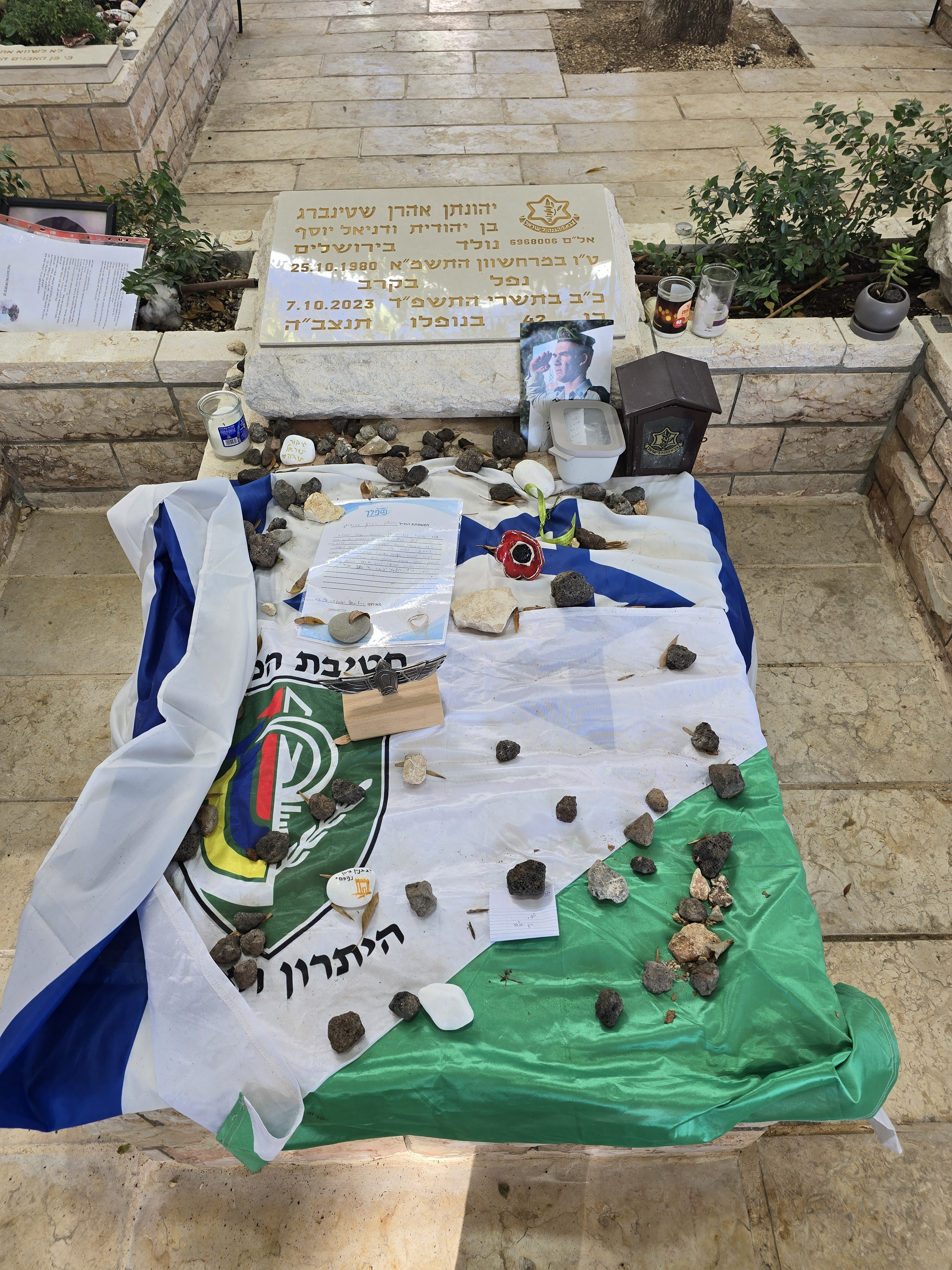

Steinberg studied at Jerusalem's Horev Yeshiva high school and Ma'ale Eliyahu yeshiva in Tel Aviv. He enlisted in the Israel Defense Forces (IDF) in August 2000 and was assigned to Battalion 931 in the Nahal Brigade. After completing basic training, he served as a combat soldier. He underwent the IDF's Combat Intelligence Collection Corps course and the IDF's Officer Candidate School. Upon completing the courses, he returned to Battalion 931, where he was appointed a platoon commander and participated in combat operations against Palestinian militants during the Second Intifada.

Later, he served as a company commander in Battalion 931. Between 2011 and 2012, he served as the deputy commander of Battalion 931. Following that, he served as the Assistant Brigade Commander (Operations) of the Nahal Brigade between 2012 and 2013. Subsequently, he was appointed the Chief of Staff's Military Secretary, serving in this role between 2013 and 2015. In 2016, he served as lieutenant colonel in Battalion 931 In 2019, he was appointed commander of the Binyamin Brigade of the IDF, reaching the rank of colonel. In 2022, he was made chief leader for tactical operations and held this position until 2023. He was made commander of the 933rd Brigade in May.

On 7 October 2023, Steinberg was killed in action in an exchange of fire with Palestinian militants during the Hamas-led attack on Israel. He was one of the most senior IDF officers to be killed in action for some time. His army-issued weapon was found by Israeli commandos in the Hamad City neighbourhood of Khan Yunis, along with personal effects of Israeli abductees, in March 2024.

== Personal life ==
Steinberg lived in Shomria, a religious kibbutz in southern Israel with his wife Yiska and six children.
