= Nahal Brigade =

Israeli military infantry brigade

933rd "Nahal" Brigade
- Nahal Brigade Insignia
- Active: 1982–present
- Country: Israel
- Branch: Israeli Ground Forces
- Type: Infantry
- Role: Infantry
- Size: 4 battalions
- Part of: 162nd Division (Israel), Southern Command
- Nickname: "Sticklights"
- Motto: "The Human Advantage"
- Colors: Light green beret ("glow stick green"), Green & White Flag
- March: "Ha-Nachal Kan" "The Nahal is here"
- Equipment: Small arms: *IWI Tavor X95; *M40 Grenade Launcher; *M72 LAW; Vehicles: M113; Eitan AFV
- Engagements: Suez Crisis; *Mitla Pass; *Six-Day War (reunification of Jerusalem, Umm-Katef) Yom Kippur War; 1982 Lebanon War; First Intifada; Second Intifada; 2006 Lebanon War; Gaza War(2008-2009); 2014 Gaza War; Gaza war

Commanders
- Current commander: Colonel Yisrael Shomer

The 933rd "Nahal" Brigade is one of the Israel Defense Forces' main infantry brigades. It has operated in all major wars and large-scale operations since its inception in 1982, playing key roles during the 1982 and the 2006 Lebanon Wars and the first and second intifadas.

== History ==
It was established as a separate brigade in 1982, in response to the growing need for infantry manpower, before the 1982 Lebanon War. Its 50th battalion was originally part of the Paratrooper Brigade in the 1950s. It is formed mainly from regular draftees, as well as from a core of soldiers from the Nahal group, part of the Nahal movement, which combines social volunteerism, agriculture (historically the establishment of kibbutz farming communities) and military service. Many Mahal foreign volunteers are also known to serve in the Nahal Brigade, providing a highly motivated and disciplined core of soldiers for the brigade.

Nahal Brigade soldiers are distinguished by their light green berets, which earned them the nickname "sticklights" (Hebrew for glowsticks). The brigade is composed of four active-duty battalions – 50, 931, 932, and 934 (the Gadsar, Hebrew for reconnaissance battalion) – and the various companies on its training base, which together comprise Battalion 933.

It operates on a rotational basis on the most volatile Israeli borders (Lebanon, Syria and Gaza) as well as in the West Bank territories. It is tasked with regular patrol and observation operations on the borders, counter-terrorist operations and riot control in the West Bank as well as tactical assault support to police operations in the territories.

It has operated in all major wars and large-scale operations since its inception, playing key roles during the First and Second Lebanon War and the First and Second Intifada.

On 10 June 1982, the Israeli air force mistook a column of IDF Nahal forces for a Syrian commando unit. An IAF F-4 Phantom attacked the Battalion 931, advancing in open APCs in south-eastern Lebanon with cluster ammunition. The unit suffered 24 soldiers killed and 108 wounded, with a further 30 soldiers shell shocked. It was the worst friendly-fire incident in the history of the IDF.

On 4 September 1982, a four-member Palestinian squad attacked an observation post manned by eight soldiers from the Nahal brigade. All the Israeli soldiers surrendered without firing a single bullet. Israel was then forced, in two separate exchange deals, to release almost 6000 Palestinian prisoners in exchange for the captured Nahal soldiers. The deals were severely criticized in Israel, for being extremely "lopsided". The less than heroic behaviour of the Nahal brigade soldiers was also pointed out. The Nahal Brigade Commander Gilboa went as far as branding the soldiers of his own brigade as "eight cowards".

In November 1987, two PFLP-GC fighters managed to slip through the Lebanese-Israeli border on hang gliders. One of them was cornered and killed by the IDF. The second fighter, Miloud Najah from Tunisia, avoided capture and attacked an IDF base outside Kiryat Shemona in northern Israel, manned by Nahal brigade soldiers. In a two minutes exchange of fire, Najah succeeded in killing six Nahal soldiers and wounding another 10, before being killed himself. The Palestinian victory was widely celebrated in the Palestinian Occupied Territories and contributed to the outbreak of the First Intifada.

In November 2002 three Nahal soldiers were killed in an ambush in the Palestinian city of Hebron. Another nine IDF soldiers and security personnel were killed in the incident, including Col. Weinberg, the commander of the Hebron brigade, were killed in the clash. The battle was widely seen as a victory for the Palestinian Islamic Jihad, who lost three fighters in the incident.

From August 2019 to June 2021, the brigade was led by Yisrael Shomer. On 28 June, Sharon Asman was appointed as the new commander. However, three days later, on 1 July, Asman suddenly died during morning training. As a result, Shomer was issued command again until a permanent replacement could be found.

=== Gaza war ===
On 7 October 2023, brigade commander Lt. Col. Yonatan Steinberg was killed during the Gaza War. The Nahal Brigade has lost 67 soldiers and commanders during the war, including during the October 7 attacks itself.

==== War Crimes ====
In April 2024, Nochi Mandel, the chief of staff of the Nahal Brigade, was dismissed following the World Central Kitchen aid convoy attack that killed seven aid workers. Mandel, a religious nationalist Israeli settler, had previously signed a letter calling for the flow of aid into Gaza to be restricted.

During the summer of 2024 an elderly Palestinian woman was taken bound and blindfolded for evacuation by an officer. However Major Menachem “Mendi” Lasri, (deputy commander of the Nahal Brigade’s 50th Battalion at the time) ordered the officer to get rid of her. Witnesses report that she was taken off the Hummer and executed. The officer continued on his way.

In February 2025, Lasri forced an elderly Palestinian in his 80s to act as a human shield by tying an explosive belt to his neck.

== Training ==
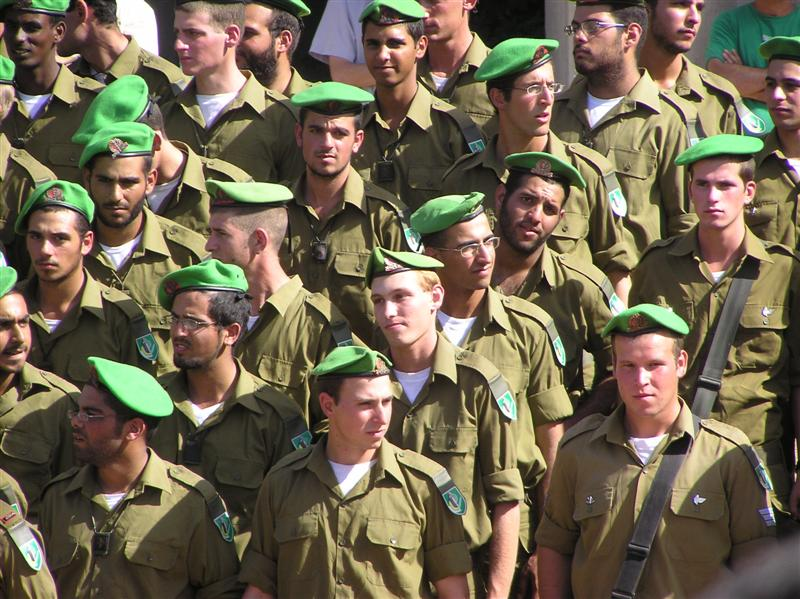
Nahal soldiers receiving their green beret

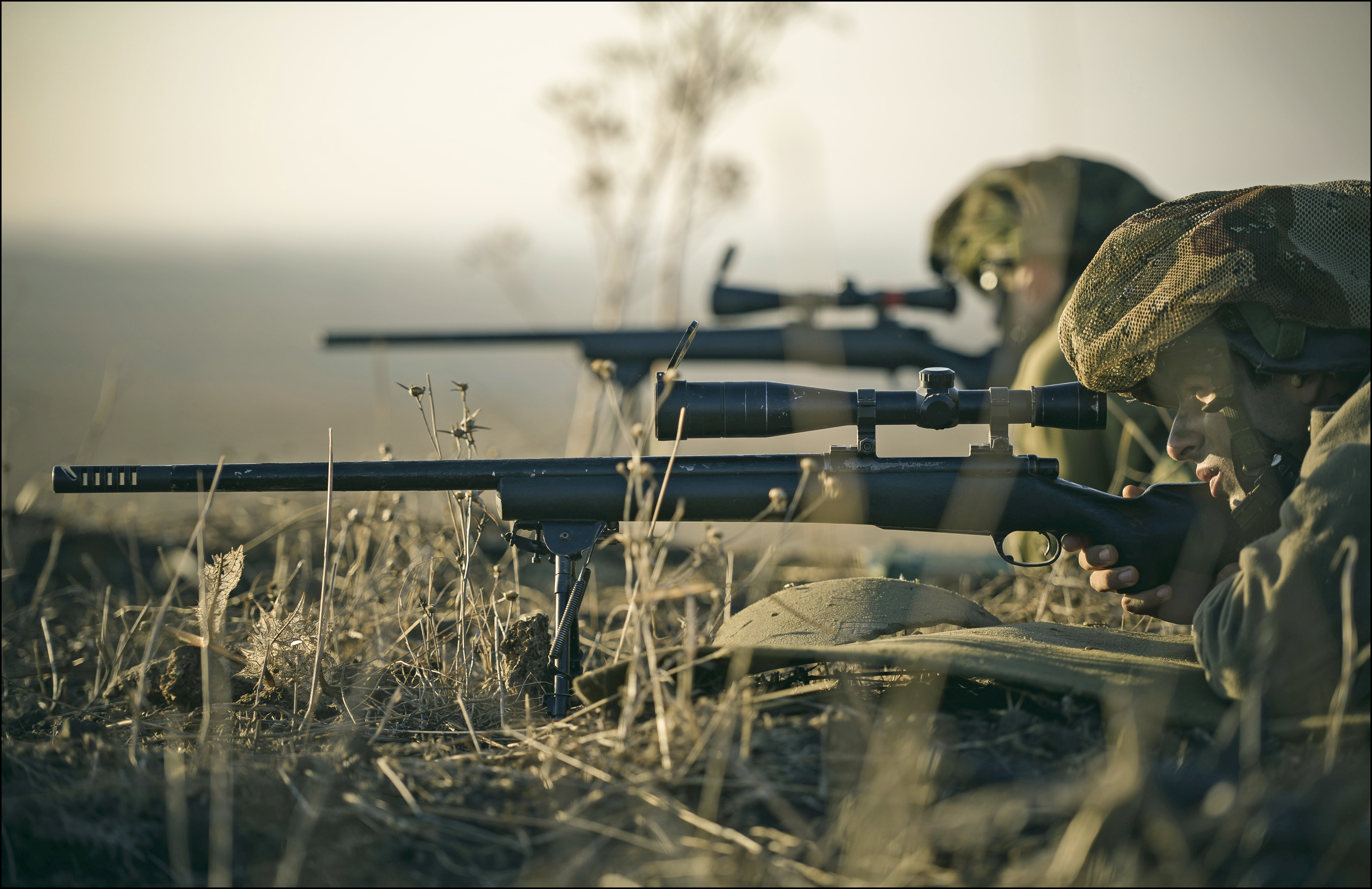
Nahal Brigade snipers (with the M24 Sniper Weapon System) during training

Nahal Infantry Brigade soldiers undertake around four months of basic training and around four months of advanced training in the Israeli desert.

=== Basic training ===
Consists primarily of physical conditioning, Krav Maga, rifle training and the qualifying obstacle course. Recruits begin their desert marches at this point in order to prepare them for their 70+ kilometers, depending on company beret march at the end of advanced training. These marches are performed fully kitted in order to prepare them for battlefield marching. Rifle training aims to perfect recruits' day and night shooting skills prior to advanced training.

Recruits undergo two-man team live firing exercises in the field. Weapon understanding and maintenance is an important element of basic rifle training. Recruits are taught army values and weapon safety and responsibility. Recruits are introduced to long field exercises in the desert. There they learn to survive for the first time on combat rations, limited water, extreme desert heat, sleep deprivation, and field injuries all while being subjected to intense physical activity. Camouflage, fortification construction, combat first aid, and stealth maneuvering will also be taught at this stage.

=== Advanced training ===
Recruits will be expected to be fully proficient with their rifles, both maintenance and shooting. Recruits displaying certain aptitudes will be sent on various specialist courses: sharpshooter training, squad automatic gunner training, tactical MATADOR-missile training, radio operator's course, advanced camouflage and fortifications course, combat paramedic course,

All recruits learn how to conduct live-fire drills at a squad, platoon, and company level. Recruits learn how to operate both on open field battlefields, desert and mountain, and in urban terrain.

After advanced training soldiers undergo a further stage of specialist training, combined with border guarding. During this time soldiers will undergo advanced urban warfare training, advanced navigation training, open field and mountain fighting training,

== Brigade organization ==
- 933rd Infantry Brigade "Nahal"
  - 50th Infantry Battalion "Bazelet" (Basalt)
  - 931st Infantry Battalion "Šoham" (Onyx)
  - 932nd Infantry Battalion "Granit"
  - (934th) Patrol Battalion "Topaz"
  - 935th Reconnaissance-Strike Battalion "Nofekh" (activated October 2026)
  - 7107th Combat Engineer Battalion "Raz" (Reserve)
  - 933rd Logistics Battalion
  - 7354th Signals Company "Palhik" (Agate)

Battalions 931 and 932 are composed entirely of soldiers who draft through the Bakum.

Prior to 2006, both groups of prospective 50th battalion soldiers were required to pass a two-day gibbush (selection phase) before being drafted in order to get into the 50th Battalion. Part of the battalion's training comprised a paratrooper course after advanced infantry training, hence Nahal Mutznaḥ, or Airborne Nahal, the name of the battalion before being transferred to the Nahal brigade. Since 2006, both the gibbush and the paratrooper course were dropped and the 50th became a regular infantry battalion. In 2010 Nahal soldiers from the 50th Battalion produced IDF Tick Tock, a viral video of themselves dancing as a flash mob in the streets of Hebron.

Soldiers in this battalion undergo an additional eight months of training in krav maga, urban combat, navigation, camouflage, parachuting and other specialized courses. During periods of low intensity conflict, the companies are tasked with capturing enemies of the state and serve as counter-terrorism forces, raiding terrorist homes and hideouts. Gadsar Nahal won the IDF Chief of Staff prize in 2010 for best land combat unit.

== Image gallery ==
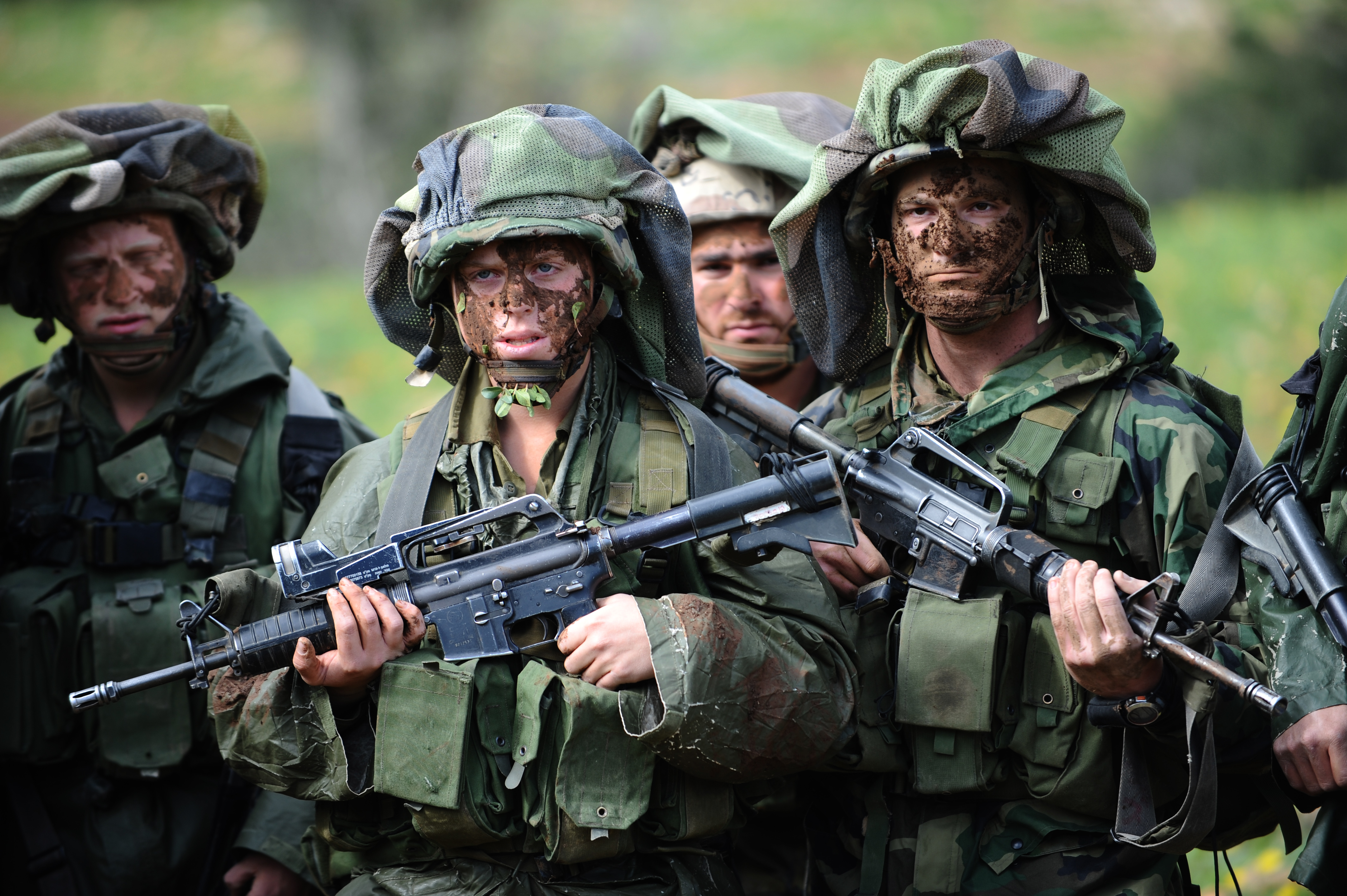
Camouflage training

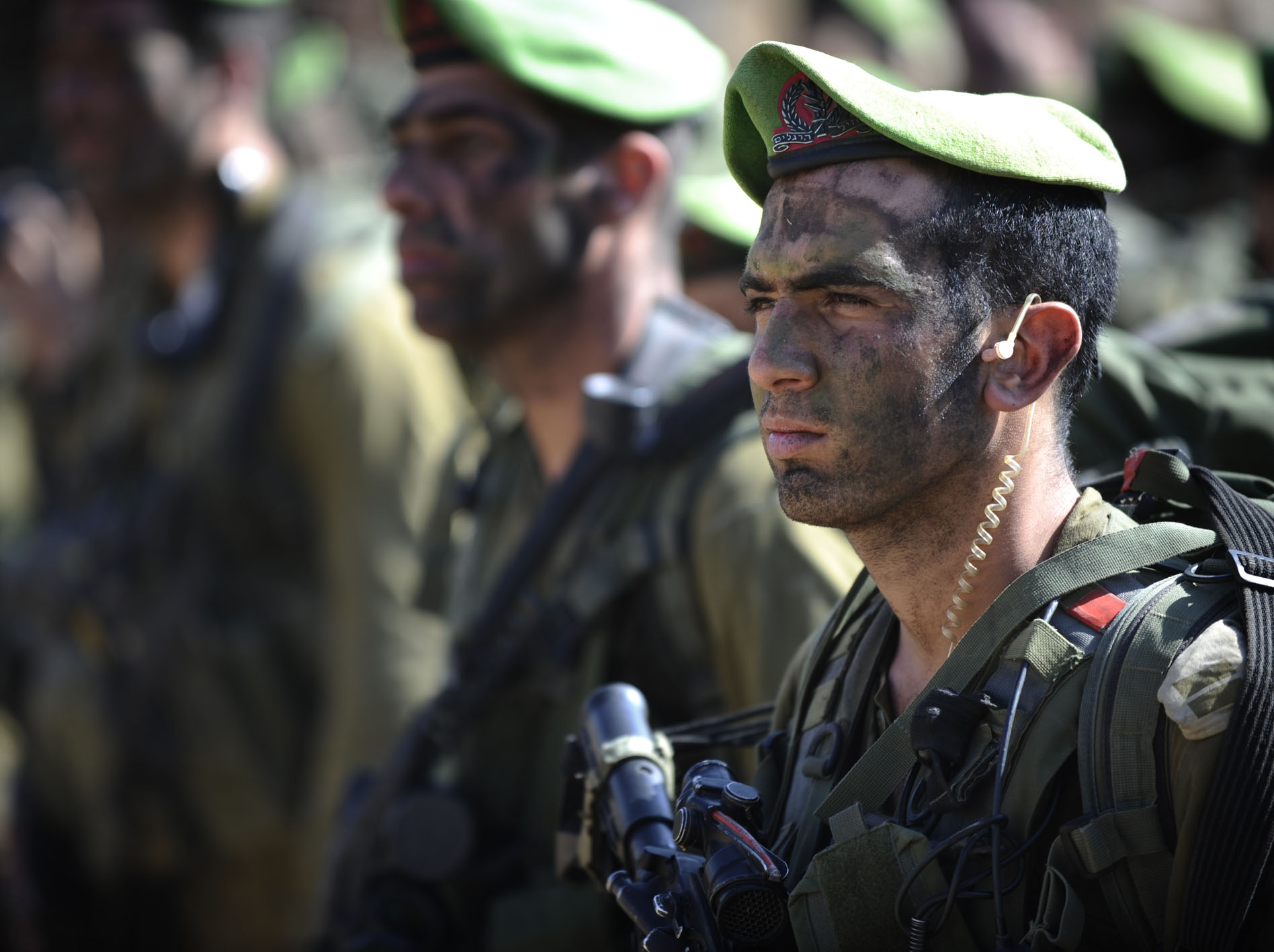
Nahal soldiers

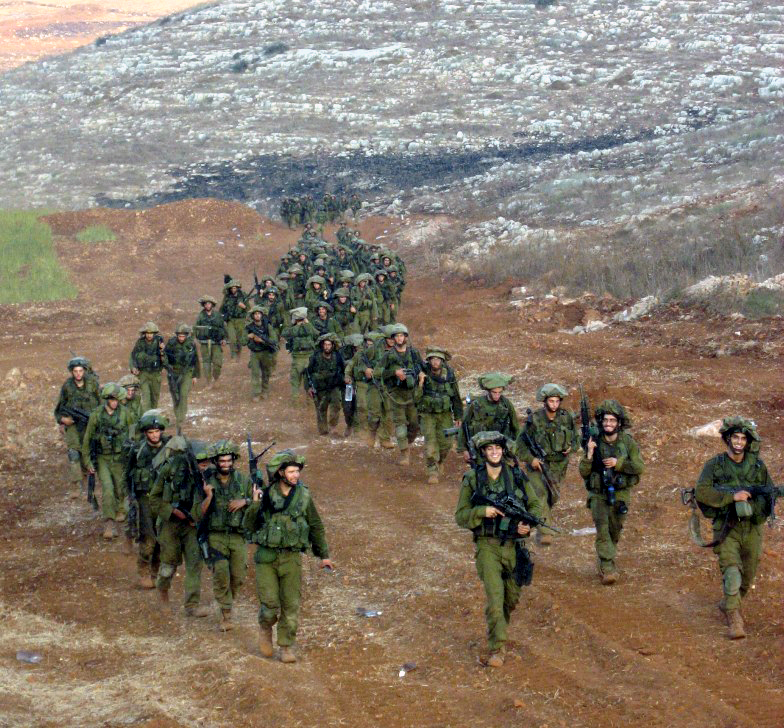
Returning to Israel after Second Lebanon War

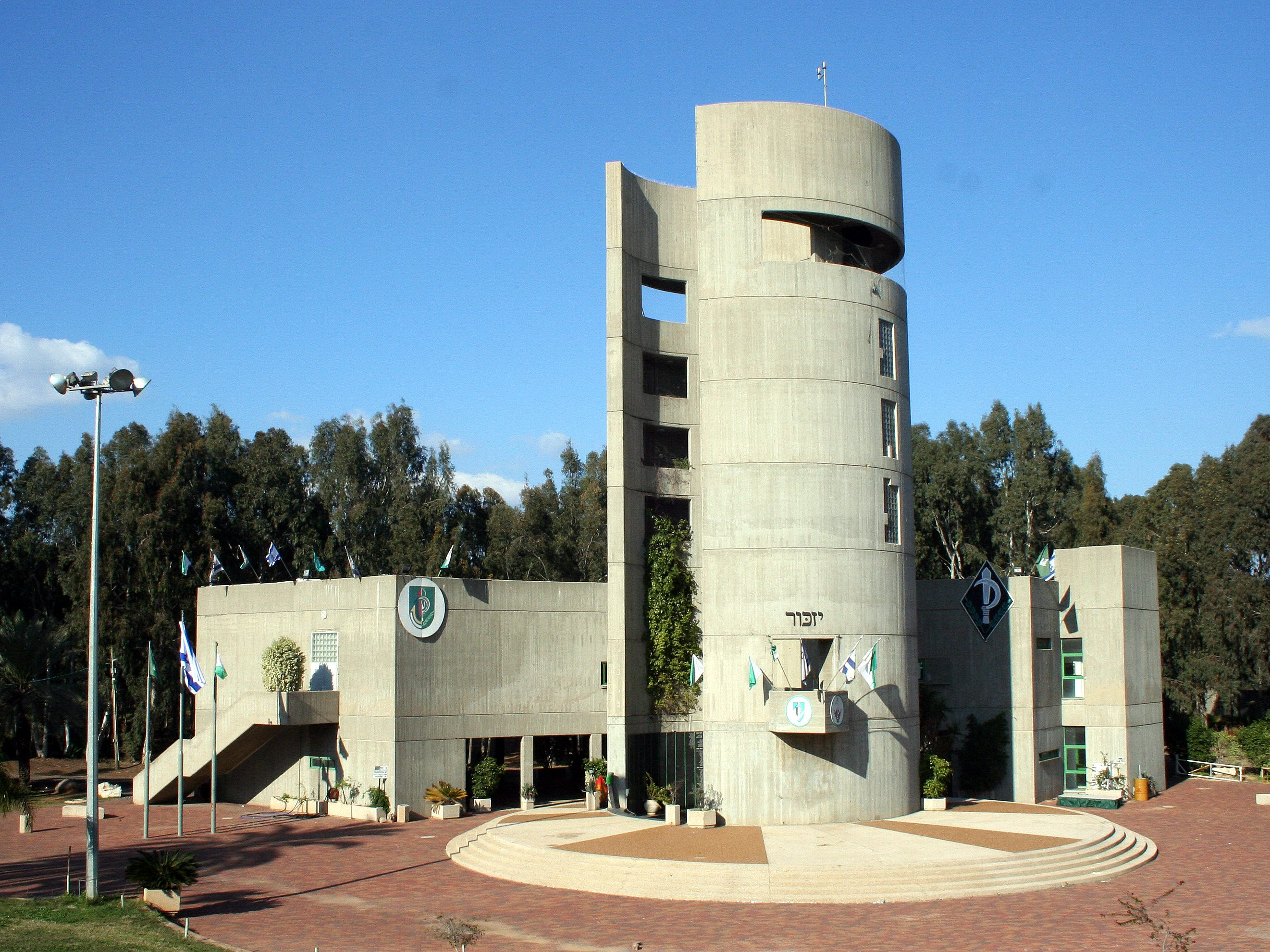
Nahal Memorial, Pardes Hanna

== See also ==
- Bhamdoun abduction operation
- IDF code of ethics
- Night of the Gliders
