= Meir Max Bineth =

Israeli Spy

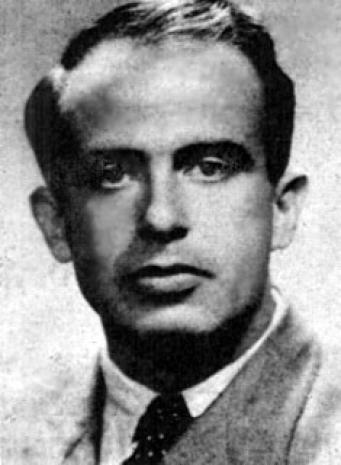
- Meir Max Bineth
- Born: 27 June 1917; Szombathely, Hungary
- Died: 21 December 1954 (aged 37); Cairo, Egypt
- Burial place: Mount Herzl, Jerusalem, Israel
- Spouse: Jane Bineth
- Children: 1
- Military career
- Allegiance: Israel
- Branch: Israel Defense Forces
- Service years: 1952–1954
- Rank: Lieutenant Colonel
- Unit: Israeli Intelligence
- Conflicts: Lavon Affair

Meir Max Bineth (Max Bennett; 27 June 1917 – 21 December 1954) was a lieutenant colonel in the Israeli Intelligence.

== Biography ==
Bineth was born in Szombathely, Hungary, and was the grandson of the scholar Jacob Obermeyer. He grew up in Cologne from 1919 until 1935, when he and his parents fled Nazi Germany and immigrated to Palestine.

Bineth's last duty and mission was as an Israeli intelligence spy (Secret Fighter) in Egypt from 1952 until the end of 1954. He was sent there undercover as a German businessman representing various German firms, primarily "von Laufenberg", a firm manufacturing equipment for the disabled. He was the first Israeli intelligence agent sent to an enemy country under a German identity, and was likely partly selected due to his early years in Germany.

Many doors of Egypt's top military echelon opened before him; he became acquainted with General Muhammad Naguib, then President of Egypt. He also built relations with German military and intelligence personnel and ranking ex-Nazi "advisors", who had found refuge in Egypt after the Second World War. Some of them were scientists who were helping Egypt develop missiles that could potentially threaten Israel.

While working in Egypt, Bineth was nominated as a consultant engineer at the "Anglo Egyptian Motors Company" (the German branch of the Ford Motor Company in Egypt). He suggested several projects to help improve Egypt's economy, believing that a crucial factor in generating wars between nations and communities is the lack of economic and social equilibrium. He wrote in his prison cell for his defence, among other things, the line "I think that the principal cause of wars is the age-old fear existing between man and communities that there may not be enough bread for all."

Bineth's cover and conduct were convenient: he had German citizenship, grew up with German culture, literature, and music, and German was his mother tongue. During the last seven months of his secret mission in Egypt, his wife Jane (South African in origin) and daughter joined him.

Bineth was caught and arrested by the SSIS after the failure of false flag Operation Susannah, an incident later known as the Lavon Affair. Bineth had been ordered by a senior officer in Israel to deliver money for the group's needs and had met Marcelle Ninio a few times. Ninio was the last to be caught; she gave a description of Bineth's car, which led to his capture.

After five months of interrogation and torture, on the day before his trial, Bineth committed suicide in his prison cell. (At the time, his wife and child were in Europe.) He realized that there was no way out for him and wanted to avoid public hanging, which was the fate awaiting him after conviction.

His body was re-interred in the Mount Herzl military cemetery in Jerusalem in 1959.

== See also ==
- Lavon Affair
- Moshe Marzouk
- Azzam Azzam
- Ouda Tarabin
- Ilan Grapel affair
- Naama Issachar affair
