= Moshe Sharett =

Prime Minister of Israel from 1954 to 1955

- משה שרת
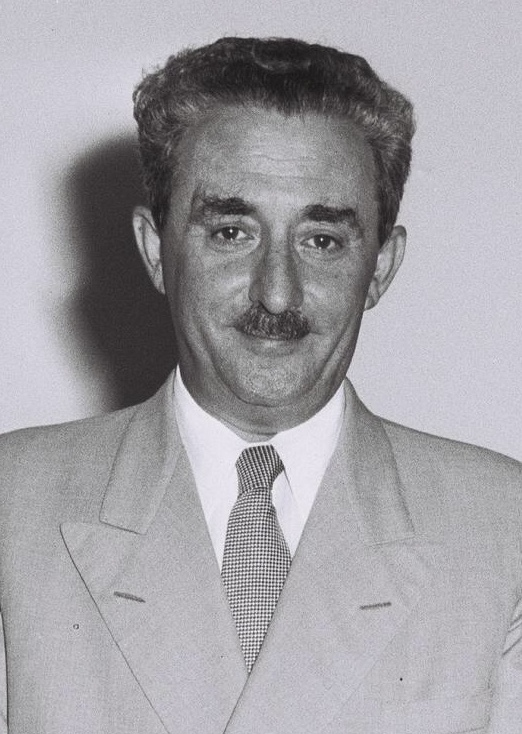
- Sharett in 1954

Prime Minister of Israel
- In office 7 December 1953 – 3 November 1955 Interim to 26 January 1954
- President: Yitzhak Ben-Zvi
- Preceded by: David Ben-Gurion
- Succeeded by: David Ben-Gurion

Minister of Foreign Affairs
- In office 15 May 1948 – 18 June 1956
- Prime Minister: David Ben-Gurion; Himself; David Ben-Gurion
- Preceded by: Office established
- Succeeded by: Golda Meir

Member of the Knesset
- In office 14 February 1949 – 7 July 1965

Personal details
- Born: Moshe Chertok; 15 October 1894 Kherson, Kherson Governorate, Russian Empire (now in Ukraine)
- Died: 7 July 1965 (aged 70) Jerusalem
- Party: Mapai
- Spouse: Tzipora Meirov (m. 1922)
- Children: 3
- Education: Istanbul University; London School of Economics
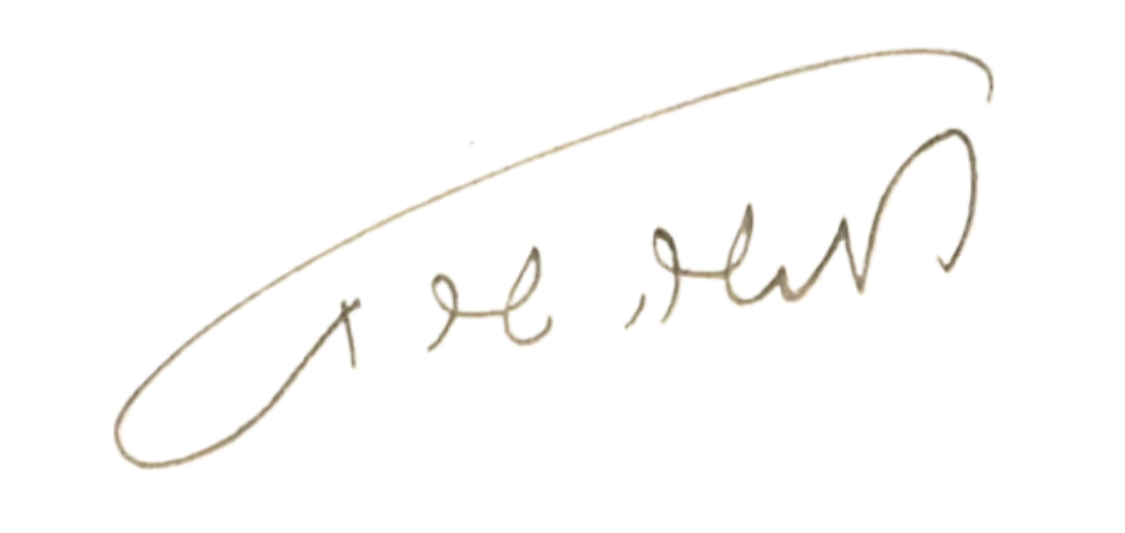
- Signature

Military service
- Allegiance: Ottoman Empire
- Branch/service: Ottoman Army
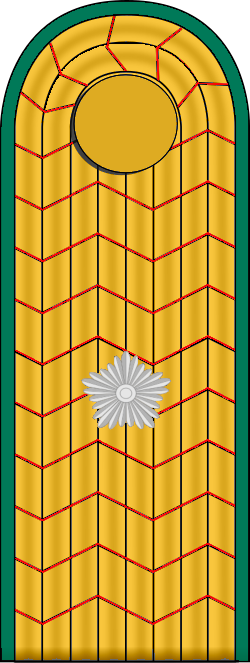
- Rank: First lieutenant
- Battles/wars: World War I Jewish insurgency in Palestine; 1948 Palestine War; Reprisal operations

Moshe Sharett (Hebrew: משה שרת; born Moshe Chertok (משה שרתוק); 15 October 1894 – 7 July 1965) was an Israeli politician who was Prime Minister of Israel from 1954 to 1955 and Minister of Foreign Affairs from 1948 to 1956. He signed the Israeli Declaration of Independence and was a principal negotiator in the cease-fire agreements that concluded the 1948 Palestine war. Beginning in 1933, he headed the political department of the Jewish Agency. He also founded the Jewish Brigade, which fought with the British Army against Nazi Germany during World War II.

A member of Mapai, Sharett's term was both preceded and succeeded by the premiership of David Ben-Gurion.

== Biography ==
Moshe Sharett was born in Kherson in the Russian Empire (today in Ukraine) to the family of Yaakov Chertok and Fanya née Lev (לב). In 1906 the Chertok family immigrated to Ottoman Palestine. For two years, 1906–1907, the family lived in a rented house in the village of Ein Siniya, north of Ramallah. In 1910 his family moved to Jaffa, then became one of the founding families of Tel Aviv.

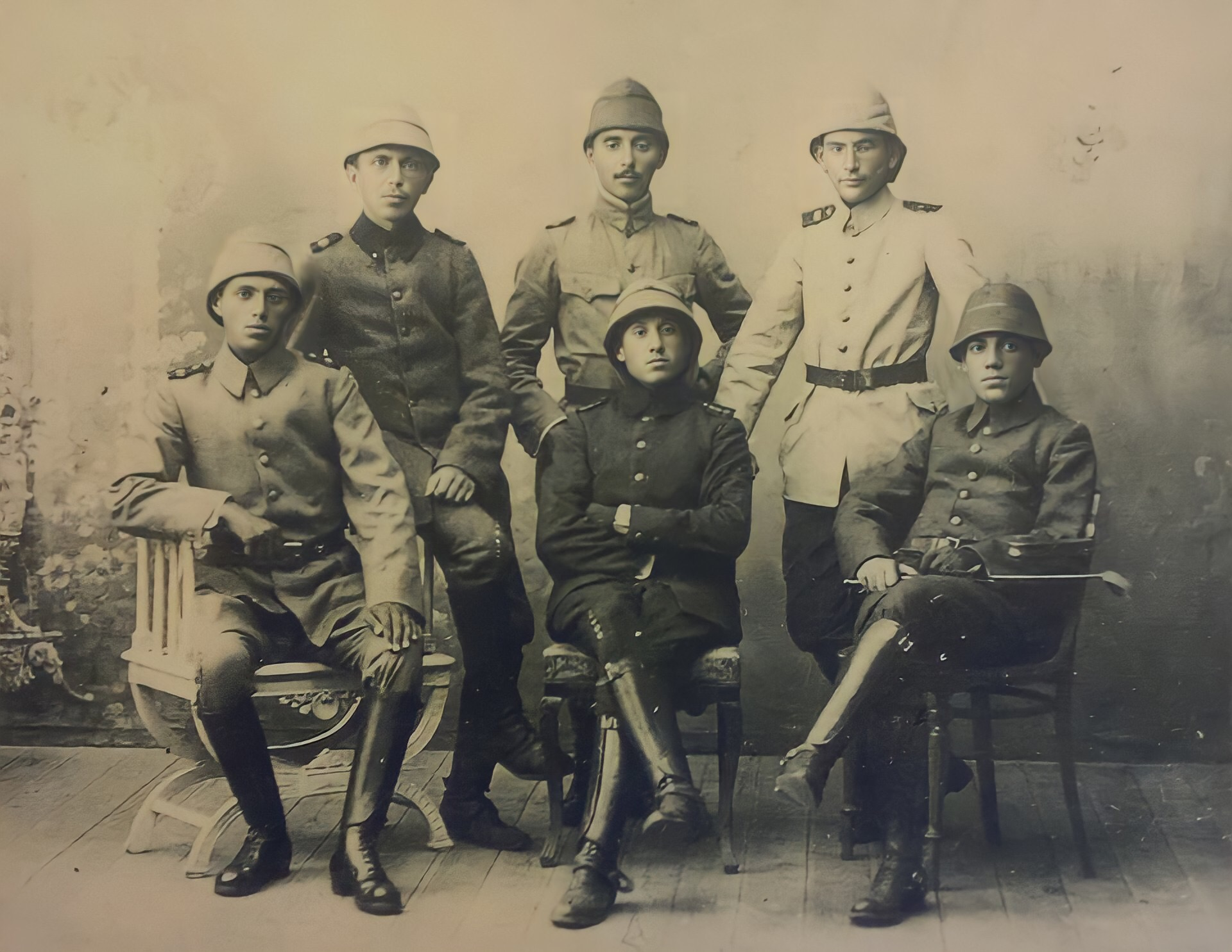
Moshe Sharett (standing in the middle), a first lieutenant in the Ottoman Army, with other Jewish officers from Palestine in the army (1916)

He graduated from the first class of the Herzliya Hebrew High School, subsequently studying music at the Shulamit Conservatory. He then went to Istanbul, then the capital of the Ottoman Empire, to study law at Istanbul University, the same university at which Yitzhak Ben-Zvi and David Ben-Gurion studied. His time there was cut short due to the outbreak of World War I. He joined the Ottoman Army in April 1916 and worked as an interpreter.

Sharett spoke Hebrew, Turkish, English and Russian, and also knew German, French and (intermediate) Arabic.

In 1922, Sharett married Tzippora Meirov, with whom he had two sons, Ya'akov and Haim, and a daughter, Yael.

== Political career ==
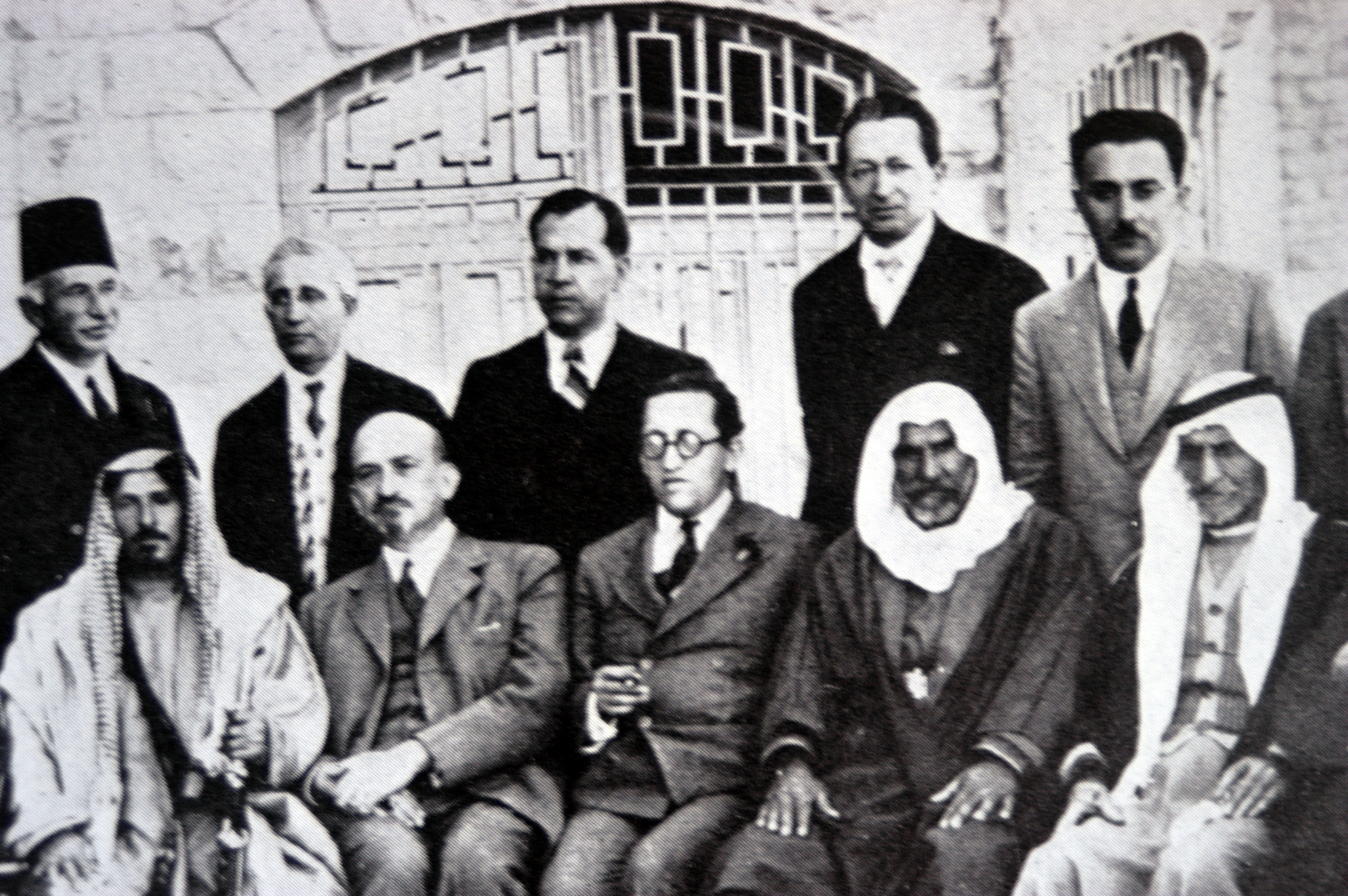
Moshe Shertok (Sharett) (standing, right) at a meeting with Arab leaders at the King David Hotel, Jerusalem, 1933. Also pictured are Haim Arlosoroff (sitting, centre) with Chaim Weizmann (to his right), and Yitzhak Ben-Zvi (standing, to Shertok's right)

After the war, Sharett worked as an Arab affairs and land purchase agent for the Assembly of Representatives of the Yishuv. He also became a member of Ahdut Ha'Avoda, and later of Mapai.

In 1922, he attended the London School of Economics, worked for the British Poale Zion and actively edited the Workers of Zion. One of the people he met while in London was Chaim Weizmann. He then worked on the Davar newspaper from 1925 until 1931.

In 1931, after returning to Mandatory Palestine, he became the secretary of the Jewish Agency's political department. After the assassination of Haim Arlosoroff in 1933 he became its head.

During World War II, via his wife Zipporah, Sharett became embroiled in the question of emigration of refugee Jews stranded in Europe and the East. Some Polish refugees, children with and without parents, were deported to Tehran with Soviet agreement. He met with Tel Aviv-bound Hungarian Jewish refugee representative Joel Brand, who had just arrived from Budapest. The Yishuv leadership mistrusted Brand, and the British thought him a criminal. Sharett's response was to hand Brand over to the British authorities, who drove him to prison in Egypt. Sharett's General Zionism was deeply concerned about making Palestine a commercially viable homeland; its secondary concern was the deep emotional impact of the murder in the Diaspora, which, by 1942, was in German hands.

Like Weizmann, whom he admired, Sharett was a principled Zionist, an implacable opponent of fascism, and a practical realist, prepared to co-operate fully with the Mandate authorities.

Sharett, as Ben-Gurion's ally, denounced Irgun's assassination squads on 13 December 1947, accusing them of playing to public feelings. Sharett held the foreign policy post under the Jewish Agency until the establishment of Israel in 1948.

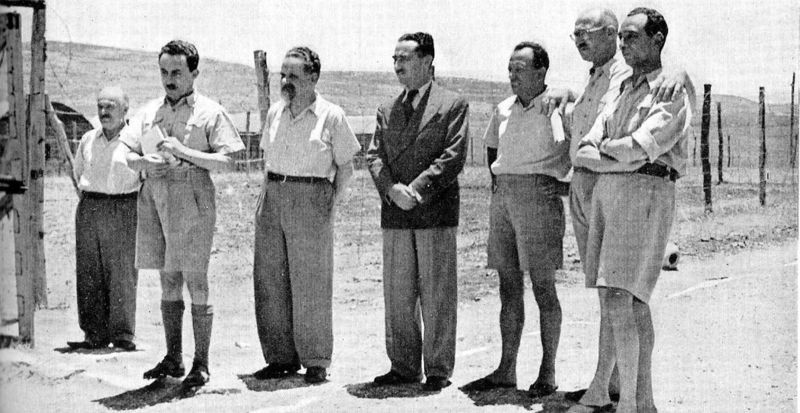
Zionist leaders, arrested in Operation Agatha, in detention in Latrun (L-R): David Remez, Moshe Sharett, Yitzhak Gruenbaum, Dov Yosef, Mr Shenkarsky, David Hacohen, and Isser Harel (1946)

== Independence ==
Sharett was one of the signatories of Israel's Declaration of Independence. Sharett was elected to the Knesset in the first Israeli election in 1949, and served as Minister of Foreign Affairs during the 1948 Arab–Israeli War. On 10 March, he was made part of the first cabinet. An armistice was signed with Lebanon that led to Israel's withdrawal from southern Lebanon on 23 March. International negotiations hosted by Britain took place on the Greek island of Rhodes at Suneh, King Abdullah's residence, when Israel's emissaries, Yigael Yadin and Walter Eytan, signed with Transjordan. Knowing the Jordanian position on the Hebron Hills, Yadin told Sharett that, surrounded by hostile Arab states, Israel had to sign the Transjordan over to Iraq. American Dr. Ralph Bunche, who drafted the United Nations (UN) treaty for Sharett's office, received the Nobel Peace Prize. The final agreement was signed at the "Grande Albergo delle Rose" in Rhodes (now the Casino Rodos) on 3 April 1949.

Ominous violence lay ahead for the new state, warned Sharett during a debate on 15 June, in which he reminded the Jewish people of their vital interests. A fourth and final agreement was signed with Syria on 17 July; the 1947–1949 Palestine war had lasted one year and seven months. In the elections that followed, Mapai formed a coalition, deliberately excluding Herut and the Communists at Ben-Gurion's behest.

As foreign minister, Sharett established diplomatic relations with many nations and helped to bring about Israel's admission to the UN. He continuously held this role until he retired in June 1956, including during his tenure as prime minister.

Sharett met with Pius XII in 1952 in an attempt to improve relations with the Holy See, although this was to no avail.

== Prime Minister ==
David Ben-Gurion withdrew from politics in 1953, and Sharett was chosen by the party to take his place. During his time as Prime Minister (the fifth and sixth governments of Israel), the Arab-Israeli conflict intensified, particularly with Nasser's Egypt. This included the Lavon Affair, which resulted in the resignation of Pinhas Lavon, the Defense Minister, and brought down the government. When Ben-Gurion returned to the cabinet, Lavon was a civilian adviser to Prime Minister Sharett. But when Sharett returned from the war, he was presented with a fait accompli; while a career diplomat was conventionally chosen as minister of defense, that was no longer the case. A portfolio once controlled by the prime minister's office was now taken by Ben-Gurion.

=== Lavon Affair ===
In 1954, three cells of local Jews living in Egypt, and one from Israel proper, were activated as terror groups to commit sabotage in Alexandria and Cairo on the orders of a secretive Unit 131 of Israeli Intelligence. The Israelis welcomed the British presence in Nasser's Egypt. Israel had formed an alliance with the European powers Britain and France. Britain had helped found the State of Israel, encouraged socialism, and fostered a sense of accountable democracy. Israel viewed Britain's historic role in Cairo as a convenient buffer against potential threatening incursions into Israel's borders.

A group of Israeli youths were chosen, ardent Zionist military trainees with little real experience of war. They were influenced by their charismatic leader and handler, Avri Elad. In July 1954 they threw firebombs into the American libraries of Cairo and Alexandria, with little damage, and cinemas in Cairo. 13 youths were arrested and tortured by the Egyptians. Two of the prisoners, including the Israeli agent Meir Max Bineth, committed suicide, and three were sent to prison. Sharett soon discovered that operations were being prepared for execution in other Arab capitals. When the news broke over Cairo Radio in summer 1954, Sharett turned to Minister for Labour Golda Meir for help. The minister of defense, Pinchas Lavon, and his Head of Military Intelligence, Benjamin Gibli, both declared each other as the responsible party.

Mapai was split over the crisis. Sharett called for a public inquiry led by a judge of the Supreme Court, Yitzhak Olshan, and a former chief of staff, Ya'akov Dori. Sharett had wanted to appoint Moshe Dayan as minister of defense but was aware that he was a controversial figure. There were those who defended his stubbornness as a military genius, and those who saw him as divisive. But criticism of Lavon was mounting. Mapai demanded the resignation of Dayan, Gibli and Lavon. Sharett appealed to a sense of fairness from Colonel Nasser, but to no avail. A guilty verdict was entered over the heads of the prisoners in Cairo. On 31 January 1955 two of the defendants, Moshe Marzouk and Shmuel Azar were hanged, found guilty of spying.

Lavon offered to resign from the Defense Ministry on 2 February 1955, the same day Sharett and Golda Meir travelled to Sde Boker to see Ben-Gurion. Lavon's resignation was accepted on 18 February. Ben-Gurion agreed to come out of retirement to fill the defense portfolio, and four months later he replaced Sharett as PM, while Sharett stayed as foreign minister. Olshan and Dori's final judicial report exposed the difficulty of political management in the Defense Ministry with the cabinet conflicts emerging from Ben-Gurion's stewardship.

Sharett's efforts to unblock the diplomatic impasse had failed. Nasser still prevented access to the Suez Canal. Israeli shipments of arms to defend the state dried up at a time when Arab belligerency was rising. Sharett might have learned from Weizmann's experience at befriending the consummate politician Ben-Gurion; Sharett also believed he could install him as his subordinate. Ben-Gurion had been out of office for a year, but returned to demand that Dayan be reappointed. Ben-Gurion spoke regularly with socialist leaders Dayan and Shimon Peres. A few weeks later an Israeli was murdered by infiltrators near the border. Ben-Gurion and Dayan immediately demanded approval of the planned Operation Black Arrow, which involved attacking Gaza. Sharett had attempted to be pacifistic and restrained during his premiership, but was overtaken by the vocal elements in Mapai and their growing electoral support in the run-up to a General election.

After the Qibya massacre, in which Dayan had caused civilians to be killed, he changed Israel Defense Forces (IDF) policy towards targeting military installations on 28 February 1955. Sharett was concerned that casualties should be kept to an absolute minimum; 8 Israelis and 37 Egyptians died in an operation that was the bloodiest since the armistice of 1949. An adjutant at the ministry, Nehemia Argov, wrote to Foreign Minister and PM Sharett to report the Gaza Raid as 8 dead and 8 wounded. The wounded were sent to Kaplan Hospital.

=== Principles of moderation ===
Sharett's diary included passages in which he bewailed the senseless denigration of duty lacking credibility. He harkened back to the days of Havlagah when in the 1930s both he and Ben-Gurion had pursued a policy of self-restraint in military matters. Sharett abhorred vengeful killing, regarding these acts as emotionally over-wrought responses devoid of moral sentiment. According to him, a policy of reprisal merely sought to justify the excessive use of force. Sharett's pacific doctrine was diluted by both Ben-Gurion and Minister of Defense Dayan, and Operational commander of the Paratroop Brigade, Sharon. Sharett opposed any move that would attract moral outcry of European powers and an arms trade embargo.

== Last months as foreign minister ==
At the next elections in November 1955, Ben-Gurion replaced Sharett as head of the list and became prime minister again. Sharett retained his role as foreign minister under the new government. Ben-Gurion justified much of his policy on the siege mentality of a minority of Jews living within 57 times as many Arabs living in 215 times the land area. Sharett came to see Nasser as "suffering from delusions of grandeur" with an almost Hitlerite ambition to export revolution abroad.

Shimon Peres was sent to London and Paris to drum up arms. He made a deal with France for jets and artillery. Peres, later a prime minister of Israel, was praised from the Knesset for handling the complexities of the 4th Republic. The uneasy diplomatic language between Nasser and Israel that had characterised the post-1949 period turned into open hostility. Nasser ended even secretive clandestine contacts. Within days of the Gaza Raid Iraq aligned in a Baghdad Pact with Turkey.

Ben-Gurion decided to replace Sharett as foreign minister with Golda Meir, who was more sympathetic to his views. The cabinet voted 35 to 7 in favour of resignation, with 75 members of the Central Committee abstaining.

The British and French would provide a shield for Israel against sanctions. Nasser proclaimed a determination to set the Palestinians free. The Egyptian army was very certain of success; the Syrians announced a "war against imperialism, Zionism and Israel". According to Ben-Gurion, the Soviet Encyclopaedia now declared the Arab-Israeli War of Independence in 1948 "was caused by American Imperialism".

== Retirement ==
After stepping down as Minister of Foreign Affairs on 18 June 1956 in protest of the new government's bellicose policy which he thought dangerously precipitate, Sharett decided to retire. During his retirement he became chairman of Am Oved publishing house, Chairman of Beit Berl College, and Chairman of the World Zionist Organization and the Jewish Agency. He died in Jerusalem in 1965, and was buried in Tel Aviv's Trumpeldor Cemetery.

== Commemoration ==
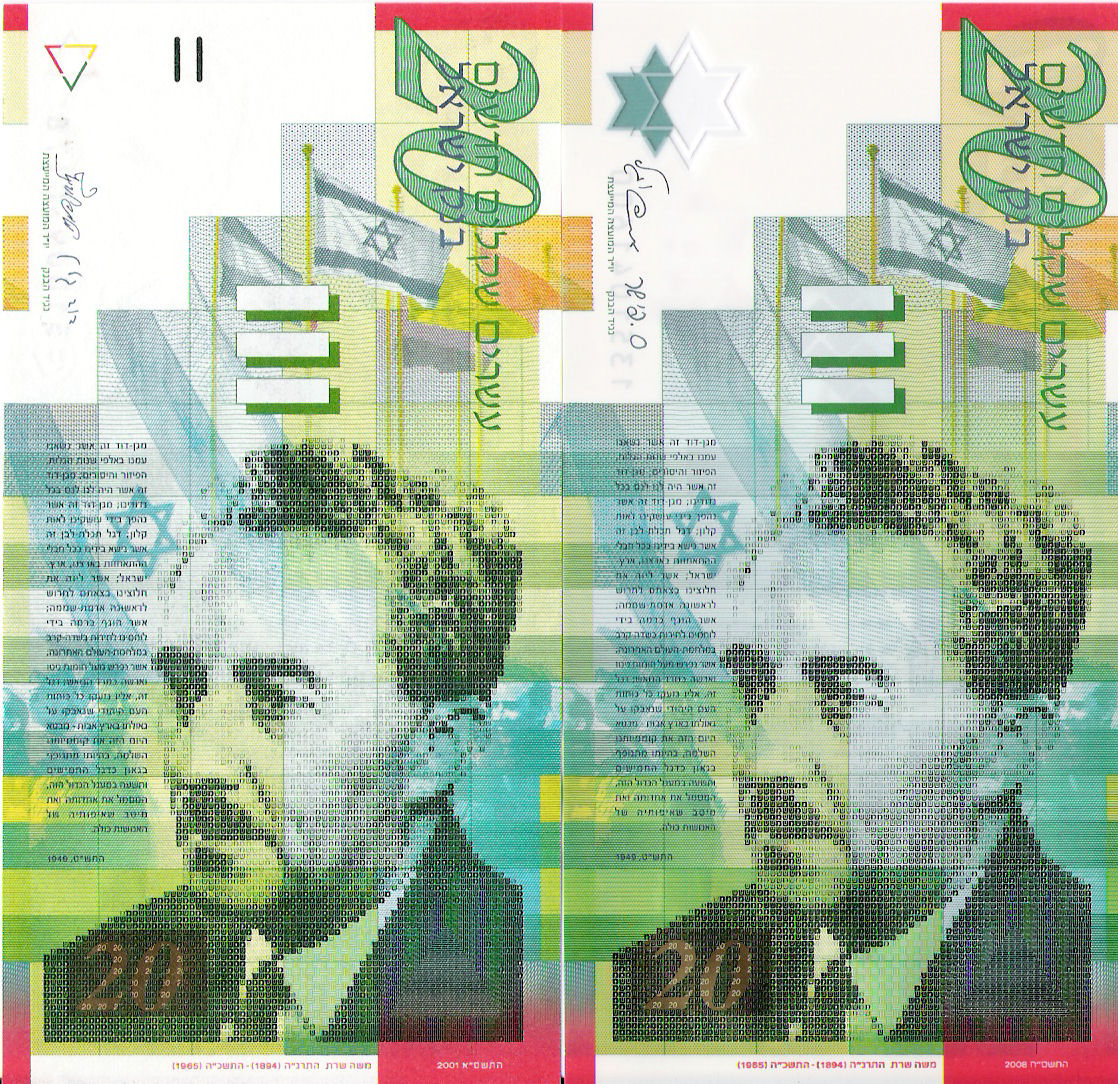
A portrait of Moshe Sharett on the 20 New shekels banknote issued by the Bank of Israel

Sharett's personal diaries, first published by his son Yaakov in 1978, have proved to be an important source for Israeli history. In 2007, the Moshe Sharett Heritage Society, the foundation that Yaakov established to care for Sharett's legacy, discovered a file of thousands of passages that had been omitted from the published edition. They included "shocking revelations" about defence minister Pinhas Lavon. A new edition published was complete, apart from a few words still classified.

Many cities have named streets, schools, or other landmarks in his honor, including streets in Tel Aviv, Bat Yam, Ramat Gan, Rishon LeZion, Herzliya, and Holon.

From 1988 to 2017, Sharett appeared on the 20 Israeli new shekel bills. The bill first featured Sharett, with the names of his books in small print, and with a small image of him presenting the Israeli flag to the United Nations in 1949. On the back of the bill, there was an image of the Herzliya Hebrew High School, from which he graduated. In 1998, the bill went through a graphic revision, with the list of Sharett's books on the front side being replaced by part of his 1949 speech to the UN. The back side then featured an image of Jewish Brigade volunteers, part of a speech by Sharett on the radio after visiting the Brigade in Italy, and the list of his books in small print. In November 2017, Sharett's portrait was replaced with that of Rachel Bluwstein as part of an overall redesign of Israeli shekel banknotes; all banknotes from the new series consistently feature portraits of poets.

== Gallery ==
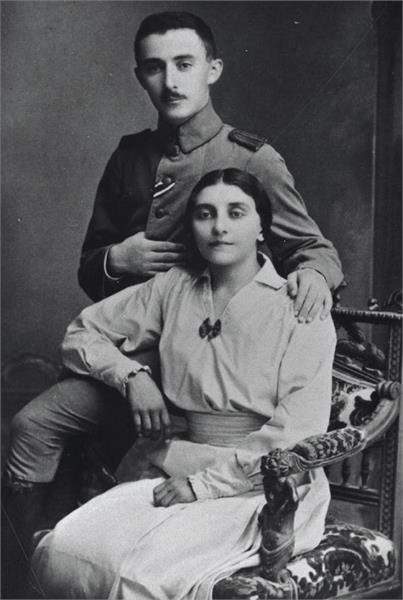
Sharett in Ottoman uniform with sister, Rebecca, 1917

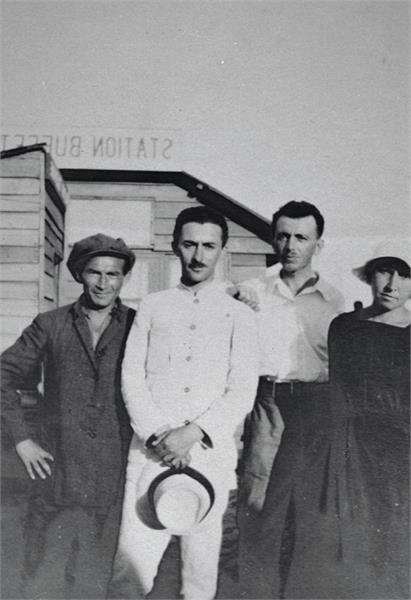
Sharett with Dov Hoz, 1930, Sharett's wife on left

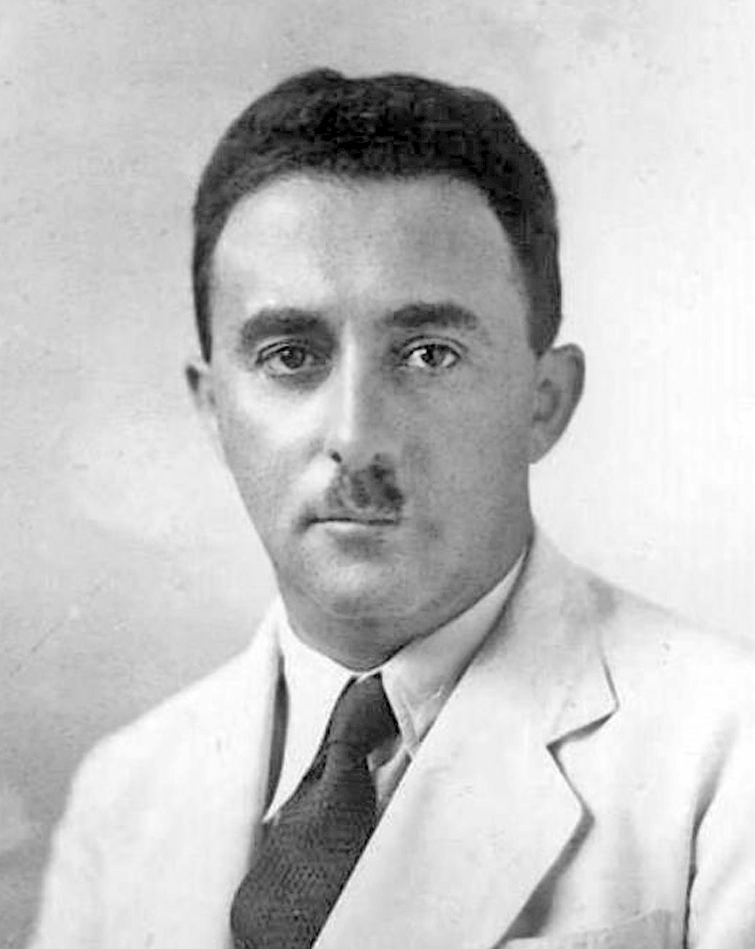
Moshe Sharett, 1936

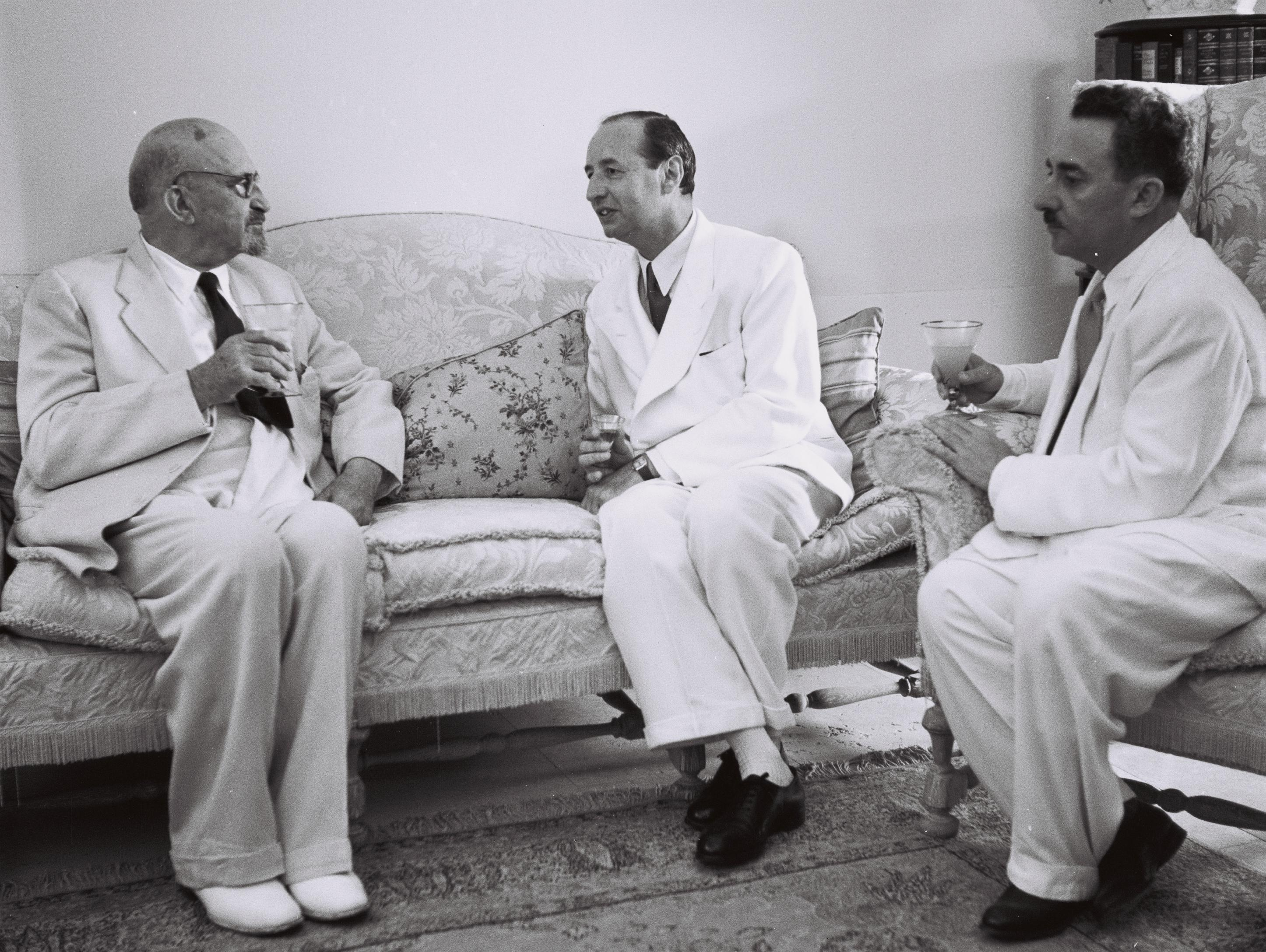
Israeli president Chaim Weizmann (left) with first Turkish ambassador to Israel, Seyfullah Esin (c), and Foreign Minister Moshe Sharett, 1950

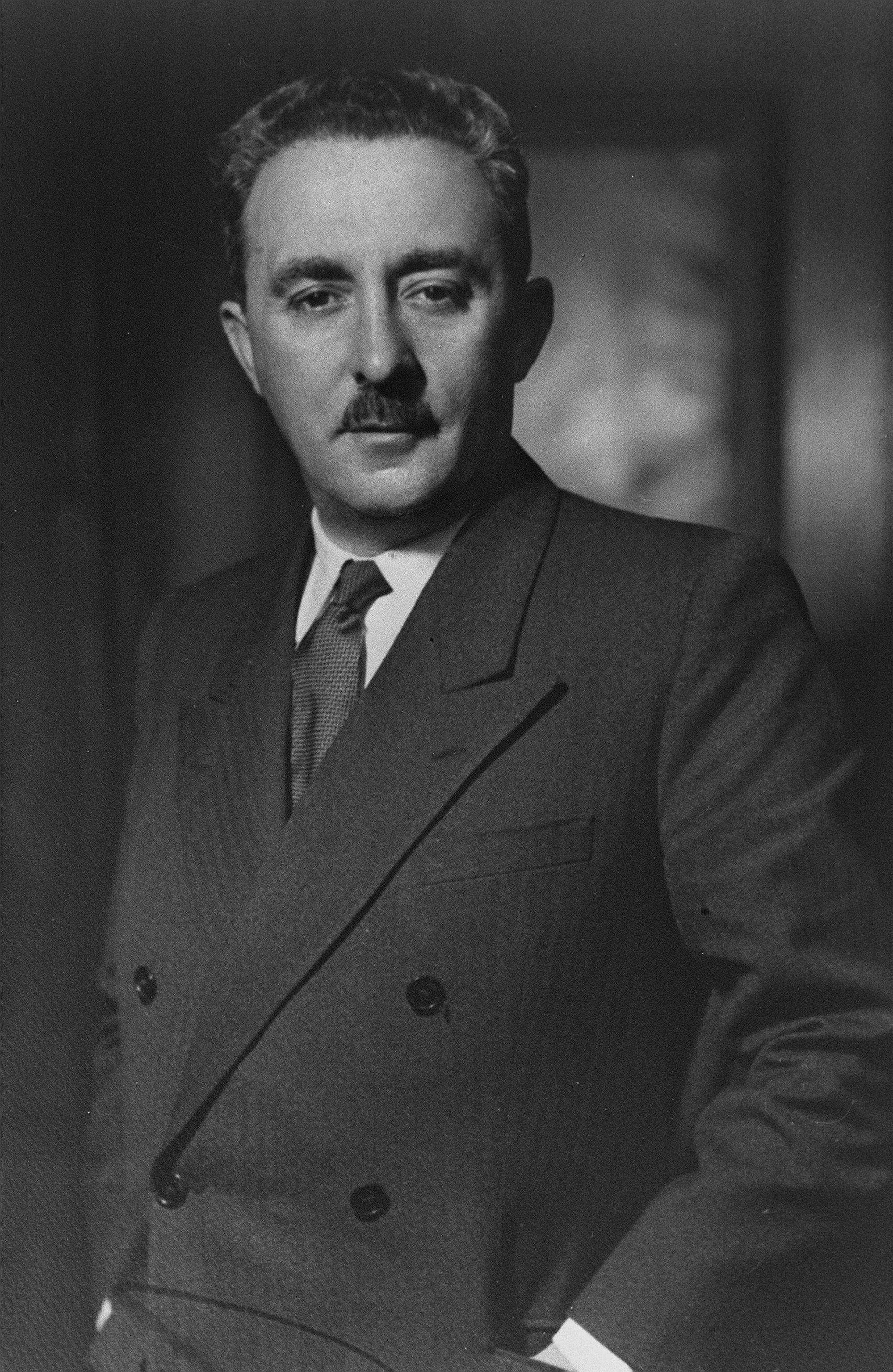
Moshe Sharett, 1952

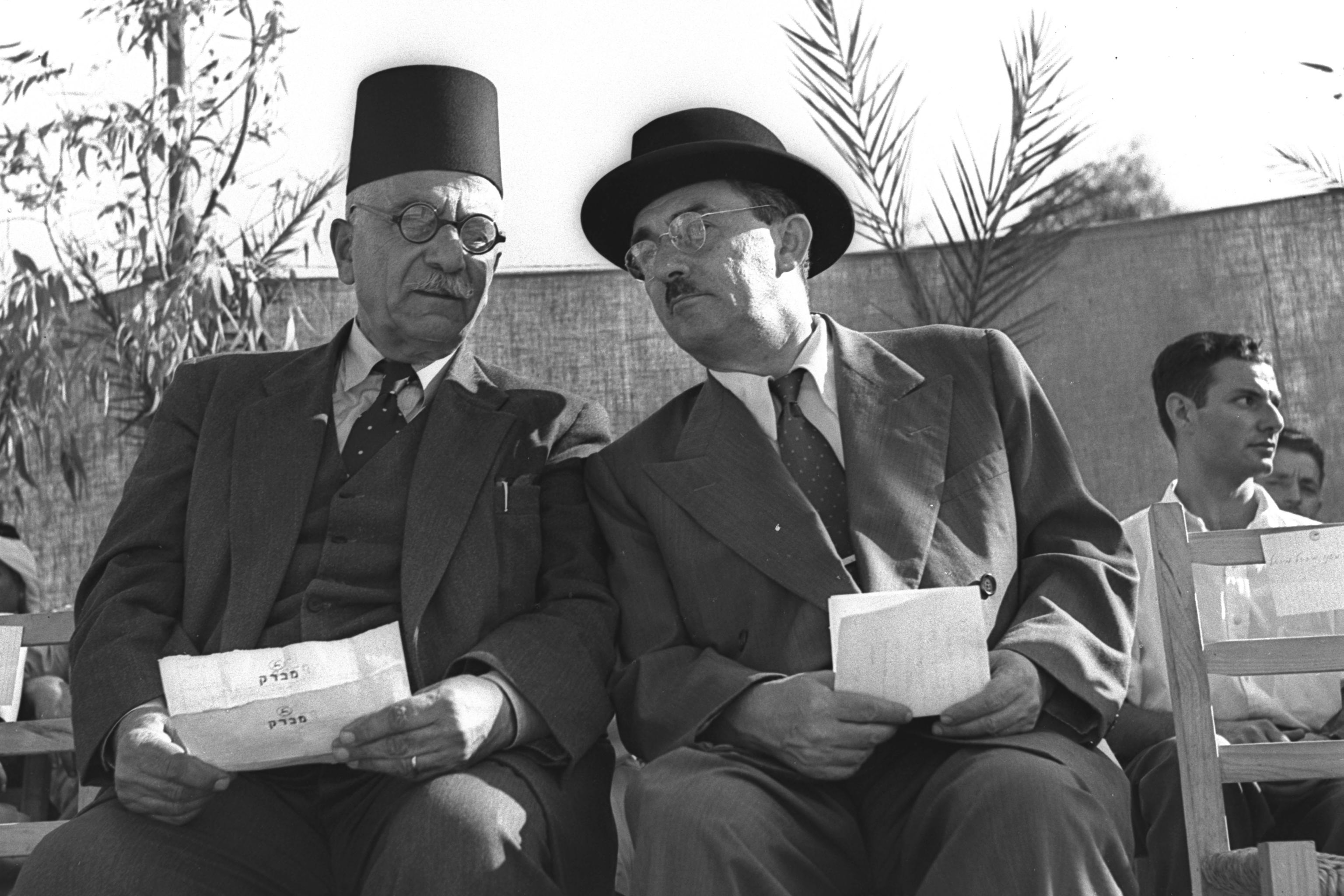
Amin Gargurah (left), the Mayor of Nazareth, and Moshe Sharett, 1955

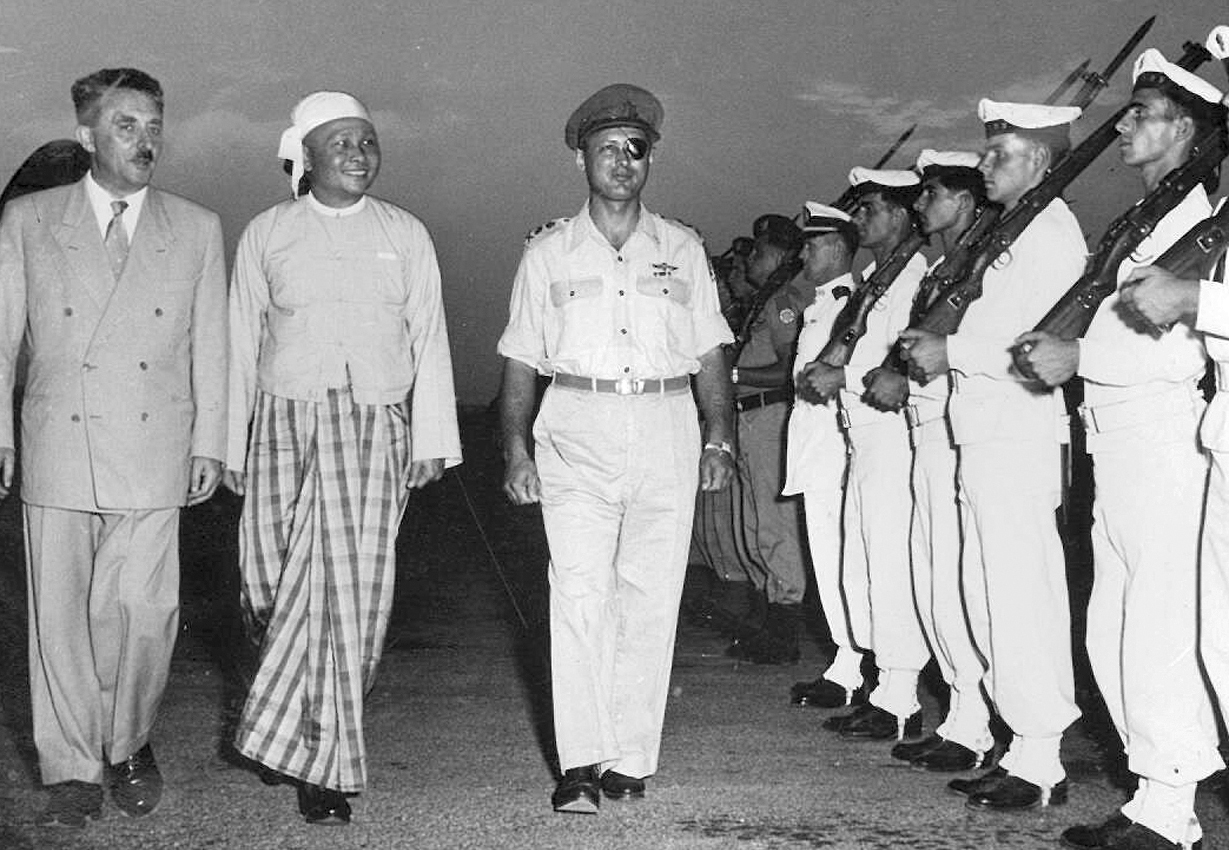
Moshe Sharett, U Nu, and Moshe Dayan at the Lod Airport in 1955.

Political offices
Preceded by David Ben-Gurion	Prime Minister of Israel; 1954–1955	Succeeded by David Ben-Gurion
Party political offices
Preceded by David Ben-Gurion	Leader of Mapai; 1954–1955	Succeeded by David Ben-Gurion
