= Ouda Tarabin =

Israeli Bedouin (born 1981)

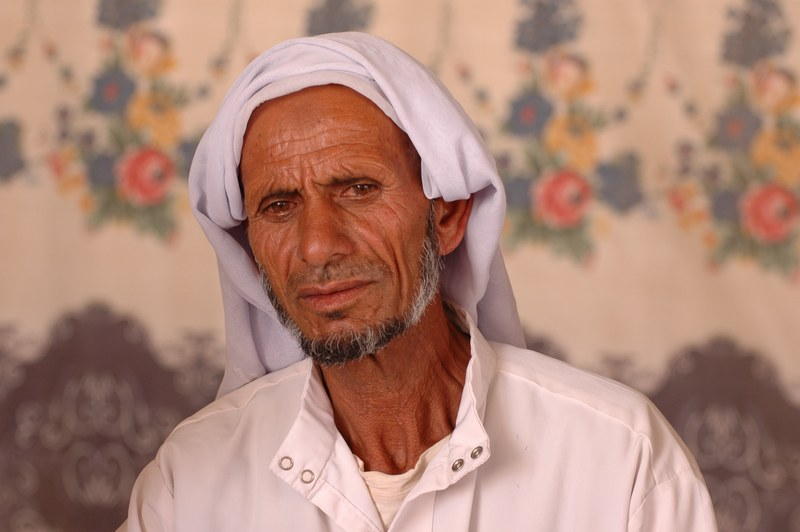
Suliman Tarabin, Israeli Bedouin, father of Ouda Tarabin

Ouda Tarabin (Arabic: عودة ترابين, Hebrew: עודה תראבין; born in 1981) is an Israeli Bedouin who was imprisoned in Egypt for 15 years on suspicion of spying for Israel after illegally crossing the Israeli-Egyptian border.

Tarabin, then aged 19, was arrested in 2000 after he illegally crossed the border from Israel (his brother suggests he went over to visit his sister in El-Arish). Illegal border crossings by the Bedouin residents of Israel and Egypt are not a rarity; Israel also occasionally arrests Egyptian crossers, who are returned over the border after a short interrogation. Ouda had previously crossed into Egypt; after his return to Israel, he was tried in absentia on charges of spying for Israel by an Egyptian military court. The stated basis of the prosecution was testimony given by Ouda's Egyptian cousin, Eid Suleiman, who was arrested for similar charges in 1999. The trial was conducted under Egypt's 1981 emergency law, granting police sweeping powers of arrest. He was convicted and sentenced to 15 years in prison. When Ouda was arrested after again crossing into Egypt in 2000, he was informed of his trial and sentence, and that his father had been similarly sentenced in absentia to 25 years for espionage. Ouda, therefore, had no chance of defending himself in person. According to his family, he had done nothing wrong other than cross into Egypt without the proper documentation. Tarabin was incarcerated in a Cairo prison, in the same cell which Azzam Azzam was once held in.

Druze MK Ayoob Kara met with Tarabin's family to work to secure his release.

In May 2012, it was reported that Israeli officials were conducting secret negotiations with Egypt, and were discussing the possibility of releasing all 83 Egyptians incarcerated in Israeli prisons in exchange for Tarabin. In 2013, Tarabin went on hunger strike in protest of his imprisonment. In December 2015, Tarabin was released from prison.

== See also ==
- Ilan Grapel affair
- Lavon Affair
- Moshe Marzouk
- Azzam Azzam
- Naama Issachar affair
