= Azzam Azzam =

Israeli Druze (born 1962)

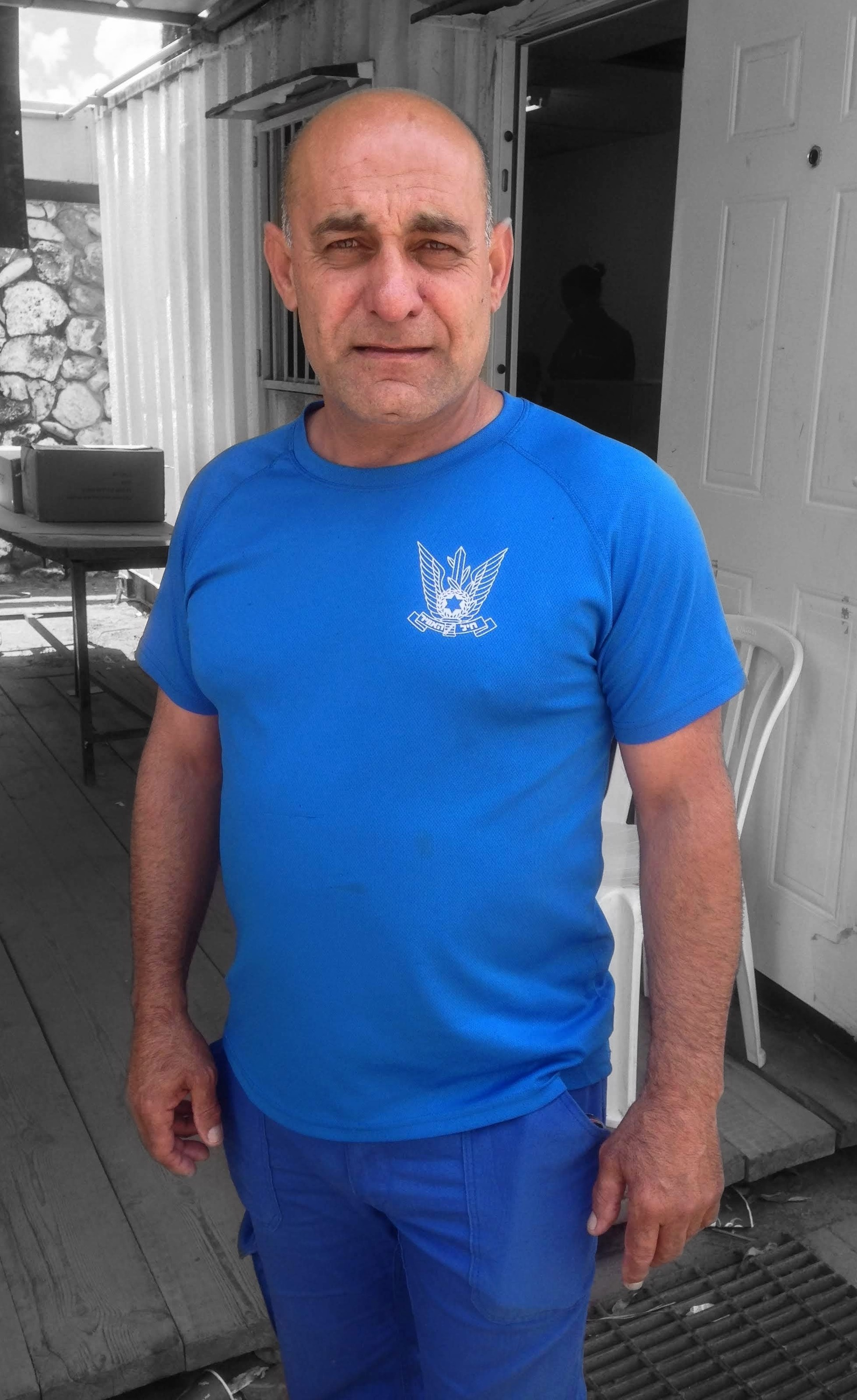
Azzam at his workplace, May 2017

Azzam Azzam (Arabic: عزام عزام, Levantine Arabic: [ʕazˈzaːm ʕazˈzaːm], Hebrew: עזאם עזאם; born 1962) is an Israeli Druze who was convicted in Egypt of spying for Israel, and jailed for eight years. He maintained his innocence throughout the ordeal.

== Arrest and trial ==
Azzam is from the town of Maghar, Israel. A mechanic by training, he worked for Tefron, an Israeli textile company. As part of his work for Tefron, he made trips to Egypt to visit local factories which were subcontractors of the company. During one such visit in November 1996, he was arrested in Cairo by the State Security Investigations Service. His arrest was kept secret for several days. It was only after it was noted in Israel that his whereabouts were unknown, and the Israeli Foreign Ministry and an official Israeli mission to an economic conference in Cairo pressed the issue with the Egyptian government that his arrest was made known.

Originally accused of industrial espionage, he was later accused of using women's underwear soaked in invisible ink to pass information to Israel's intelligence agency Mossad.

The trial opened on April 24, 1997, but was postponed until May 18, when it was discovered that the lawyer for his Egyptian co-defendant, Emad Abdel-Hamid Ismail, was not present. In the interim, the Egyptian Lawyers' Syndicate received a memo signed by twelve attorneys, stating that by defending Azzam, his lawyer, Farid Deeb, "polluted the distinguished history of the Lawyers' Syndicate". The letter demanded that disciplinary action be carried out against Deeb for "undertaking the defense of the Israeli spy"; in response the Syndicate decided to bring Deeb before its disciplinary committee on June 11. (Al-Wafd, May 14).

At the May 18 trial, a representative of the Lawyers' Syndicate requested that the court disqualify Deeb from defending Azzam, claiming that Azzam had acted against the Egyptian national interests. The court summarily denied the request, insisting that every individual had a right to legal representation. As well, the prosecution added the indictment that Azzam was a Mossad agent intending to harm the interests of Egypt, which allowed the prosecution to request the death penalty.

In August 1997 Azzam was convicted of helping to send news about Egyptian industrial cities to Mossad, and sentenced to fifteen years jail at hard labor; his co-defendant Ismail was sentenced to twenty-five years. Both Azzam and the Israeli government denied the charges.

Azzam was held in a small cell in harsh conditions which were slightly improved later on. While imprisoned, Azzam listened to a transistor radio. He secretly listened to Israeli radio broadcasts when the guards were not present.

== Freed by Egypt ==
After Shabak (Israel's internal security agency) head Avi Dichter had negotiated with his Egyptian counterparts, Azzam was released on December 5, 2004. In return, Israel freed six jailed Egyptian students who were accused of planning terrorist attacks.

Azzam expressed gratitude to the government of Israel, and to Ariel Sharon in particular, telling him "I love you very much," Azzam said. "I told my brothers that if I don't get out when Ariel Sharon is prime minister, I never will. I am lucky to have been born in Israel and I'm proud of it."

An official Israeli government press release stated,

Prime Minister Sharon reiterated his deep gratitude to Egyptian President Mubarak and to Gen. Soliman and emphasized that this humanitarian gesture would make an additional contribution towards the deepening of bilateral relations.

== Later life ==
Azzam returned to his home village of Maghar. In 2005, he lit the torch during the main ceremony of Israeli Independence Day. He found work as a branch manager for the Israeli company "Ace Buy-and-Build". Later, he found work as a maintenance man in the Haifa oil refineries. He also participated in Survivor 10: V.I.P, the sixth season of the Israeli reality show Survivor.

== See also ==
- Ouda Tarabin
- Ilan Grapel affair
- Lavon Affair
- Moshe Marzouk
- Naama Issachar affair
