= Ilan Grapel affair =

2011 alleged Israeli espionage incident

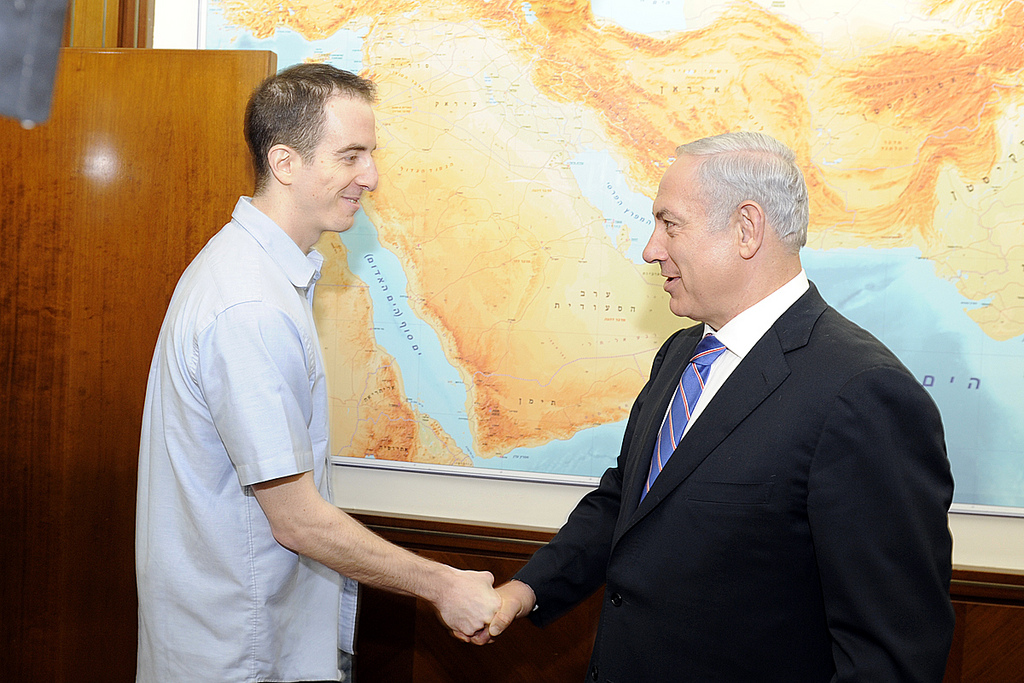
Ilan Grapel after his release on October 27, 2011, with Israeli prime minister Benjamin Netanyahu

The Ilan Grapel affair was an alleged Israeli espionage incident in Egypt involving dual U.S.-Israeli citizen Ilan Grapel. On 12 June 2011, Egyptian authorities arrested Grapel on charges of fomenting unrest in Egypt as a Mossad agent in the wake of the 2011 Egyptian revolution. Israel and Grapel's friends and family firmly rejected the charges, and the Egyptian government never provided public evidence to support its claim of Grapel being in involved in espionage.

On October 25, 2011, Israel and Egypt agreed on the release of Grapel in exchange for 25 Egyptian prisoners held in Israeli jails. The exchange was executed on October 27, 2011, ending Grapel's nearly five months of imprisonment.

== Arrest and charges ==
Ilan Grapel, a 27-year-old man born in Queens with dual American and Israeli nationality, was arrested on 12 June 2011 by Egyptian authorities, who claimed that Grapel was sent to Egypt by Mossad to build a team that had been trying to gather information and data and to monitor the events of the 2011 Egyptian revolution. The authorities also claimed that Grapel tried to incite violence amongst Egyptian protesters to spark a face-off with the military and spreading chaos in Egypt.

Friends and family of Grapel, as well as the Israeli government, adamantly rejected the espionage charges against Grapel and denied he had any connections to the Mossad. At the time of his arrest, Grapel was a rising third-year student at the Emory University School of Law. Grapel's friends and family said he went to Egypt for the summer to intern at Saint Andrew's Refugee Services, a non-government legal group that helps resettle refugees. Grapel had a long-time interest in Islam and the Middle East. He is trilingual, speaking English, Hebrew and Arabic.

The Egyptian government never gave evidence to support its claims against Grapel, and even in Egypt, the arrest was widely ridiculed.

In early October 2011, with reports increasingly indicating that Grapel would be released shortly, a senior Egyptian official admitted that Grapel wasn't a spy, according to the London-based newspaper al-Hayat. The source stated, "what Grapel did during the revolution did not amount to spying, and by this logic, he can be released in exchange for financial benefits".

== Biography ==
Ilan Grapel is a dual U.S.-Israeli citizen originally from Queens, New York. In 2005, Grapel graduated from Johns Hopkins University in Baltimore, Maryland, with a bachelor's degree in international studies. He then moved to Israel and performed compulsory military service in Israel. During his service, he was wounded in the 2006 Lebanon War. Grapel later returned to U.S. for law school, enrolling in Emory University in Atlanta, Georgia. His mother, Irene, said her son "always wanted to do good for the world" and went to Egypt to perform legal aid as part of this commitment. She added, "Ilan is a young man who wanted to see all sides of every issue."

In the summer of 2002, Grapel worked as an intern in the Queens office of Democratic congressman Gary Ackerman, who has lobbied for his release.

== Prisoner exchange deal ==
Following the successful execution of the first phase of the Gilad Shalit prisoner exchange on October 18, 2011, with the support of Egyptian mediators, Israel and Egypt agreed on the release of Grapel in exchange for 25 Egyptian prisoners. On October 25, 2011, Israel's Security Cabinet unanimously approved the prisoner swap, clearing the way for Grapel to be released to Israel on October 27. Israeli prime minister Benjamin Netanyahu thanked the U.S. for helping achieve the Grapel deal. The Israeli government stated that none of the Egyptian prisoners to be released are "security prisoners".

On October 27, 2011, Egyptian authorities released Grapel, and he arrived in Israel on a private jet. He subsequently flew to New York. The same day, Israel sent the 25 Egyptian prisoners into Egypt through the Taba Border Crossing.

== Implications ==
The arrest of Grapel sparked fears in Israel that relations with Egypt would sour after the fall of long-time Egyptian ruler Hosni Mubarak.

Yaroslav Trofimov of The Wall Street Journal asserted that the arrest of Grapel and other Westerners in the aftermath of the 2011 Egyptian revolution was part of a "military-inspired xenophobia campaign" to distance Egypt's new military rulers from the West, "portraying pro-democracy activists as spies and saboteurs, blaming the country's economic crisis and sectarian strife on foreign infiltrators, and blasting the U.S. for funding agents of change". He wrote, "As a result, connections with the U.S. and other Western countries have turned toxic just as the largest Arab country is struggling with a rocky transition to democracy." The detention of Grapel served to aggravate U.S.-Egyptian relations.

Boaz Ganor, founder and executive director of Israel's International Institute for Counter-Terrorism (ICT), said that it has always been dangerous for Israeli citizens to visit Arab countries. Still, it is unlikely for Arab states to adopt the arrest of Israelis as a tactic to extort Israel. Ganor stated that "the Grapel affair was designed to satisfy the Egyptian masses, and was a stage-managed incident meant to use 'the traditional rival – Israel – to distract Egyptians from their real problems.'" Ely Karmon, a senior researcher at ICT added that Egypt "has a record of arresting innocent Israelis such as Azzam Azzam and Ouda Tarabin and framing them as spies to prove to its anti-Israel public it is looking after state security".

== See also ==
- Ouda Tarabin, imprisoned in Egypt from 2000 until 2015
- Lavon Affair, 1954 failed Israeli false flag operation against Egypt
- Moshe Marzouk (1926–1955), executed spy for Israel in Egypt
- Azzam Azzam, Israeli convicted in 1997 for spying in Egypt, freed in 2004
- Naama Issachar affair, Israeli-American transit passenger arrested in 2019 in a Moscow airport, released in 2020
