= Marcelle Ninio =

Israeli spy in Egypt - part of Lavon affair

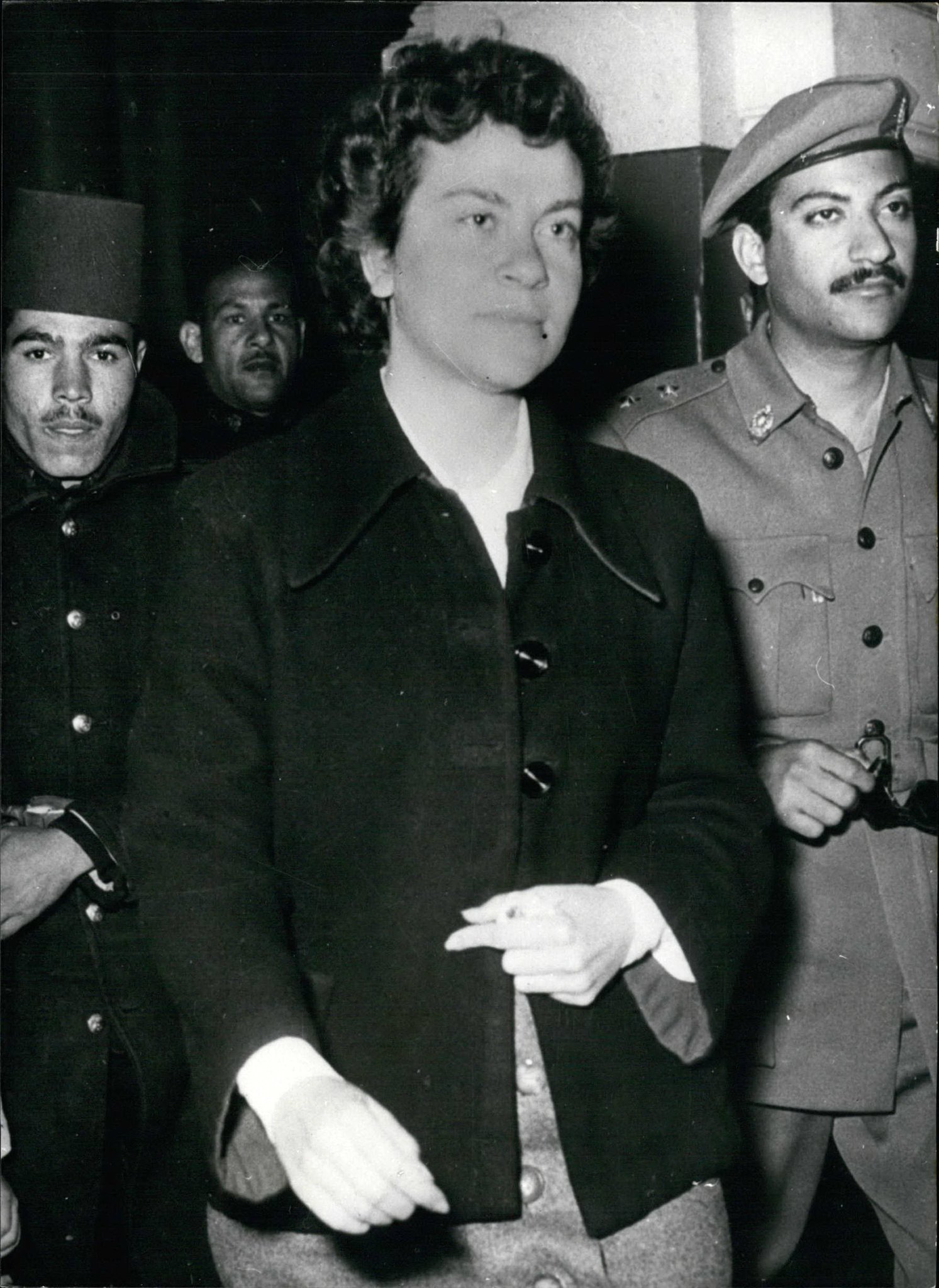
- Ninio during her arrest
- Born: Victorine Marcelle Ninio; 5 November 1929; Cairo, Egypt
- Died: 23 October 2019 (aged 89); Hod HaSharon, Israel
- Occupation: Secretary
- Known for: Spying for Israel

Victorine Marcelle Ninio (5 November 1929 – 23 October 2019) was an Egyptian secretary and an Israeli spy who became involved in what was known as the Lavon affair. She served time in an Egyptian jail before she was released and she went to live in Israel.

== Life ==
Ninio was born in Cairo in 1929. Her father Ya’acov was Bulgarian and her mother, Fanny, was Turkish. Her father died when she was young and she went to both Catholic and Jewish schools. Ninio joined a Jewish club, but she was more interested in basketball than in Zionism and she was a candidate to join Egypt's Olympic squad.

Ninio was recruited to act as a liaison for an Israeli spy cell in 1951. She was the only woman and her colleagues noted how unafraid she was, although it is not clear that she was aware of the dangers involved in her activities. The cell became active in 1954 and attempted to plant bombs inside Egyptian-, American-, and British-owned civilian targets: cinemas, libraries, and American educational centers to sour relations between Egypt and the Western countries.

The members of the cell that she was in were arrested after one of the cell members had a device go off prematurely whilst he was at the cinema. This caused embarrassment in Israel and the Defence Minister, Pinhas Lavon's, resignation made this "the Lavon Affair". Lavon and the Prime Minister denied any knowledge of their activities, but Lavon was named by one of the accused.

The trial began on 11 December and lasted until 27 January 1955; two of the accused (Moshe Marzouk and Shmuel Azar) were condemned to execution by hanging, two were acquitted, and the rest, including Ninio, received lengthy prison terms. Ninio received a 15-year sentence. The trial was criticised in Israel as a show trial, albeit the Israeli public were led to believe that the defendants were innocent. It was said that evidence had been extracted by torture.

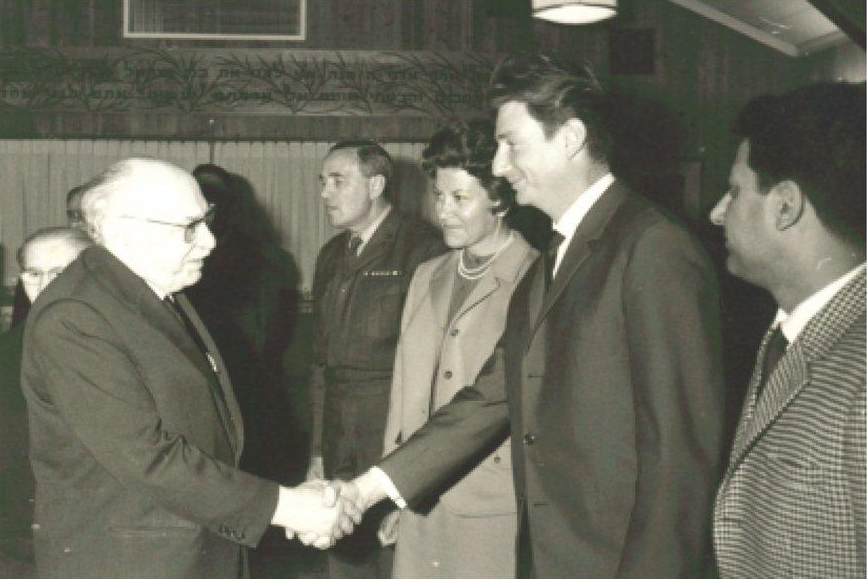
Israeli President Zalman Shazar met with the released operatives in 1968, (from left to right): Ninio, Philip Nathanson, and Robert Dessa.

After serving seven-year jail sentences, two of the imprisoned operatives (Meir Meyuhas and Meir Za'afran) were released in 1962. Ninio and the rest were freed in February 1968, in a secret addendum to a prisoner-of-war exchange.

In 1971, Prime Minister Golda Meir publicly accepted an invitation to Ninio's wedding to Ely Boger, and spoke with her about her time in prison. The meeting was taken as a sign by censors that more information about the Lavon affair could be released.

Ninio attended Tel Aviv University and learnt Hebrew to add to her fluent Arabic, and the French and English she had learnt at school. Lt. Gen. Moshe Ya’alon recognised her work in 2005 when she, Robert Dassa and Meir Zafran were given a military rank in the Israeli military.

Ninio died in Hod HaSharon in 2019.
