= Jacob Obermeyer =

Bavarian oriental researcher (1845–1938)

- Born: 21 March 1845; Steinhart, Bavaria
- Died: 1 March 1938 (aged 92); Würzburg, Bavaria
- Occupations: Oriental researcher, scholar and traveler

Jacob Obermeyer (21 March 1845 in Steinhart – 1 March 1938 in Würzburg) was a Bavarian Jewish oriental researcher, scholar and a traveler, and the grandfather of the Israeli agent Meir Max Bineth.

== Biography ==
=== Early years ===
Jacob Obermeyer was born in 1845, at Steinhart bei Ottingen (since 1976 incorporated into Hainsfarth) in Bavaria, modern-day Germany. His intellectual and spiritual training included men such as Chacham Isaac Bernays, rabbi Jacob Ettlinger and rabbi Seligman Bamberger.

Throughout his youth he acquired Talmudic knowledge. In early childhood he started to show a particular interest in the oriental Jewish life. In 1868 he traveled through North Africa from Morocco to Egypt and crossed the whole of Palestine and part of Syria to Damascus.

=== Teacher in Baghdad ===
In 1869 he was summoned to Baghdad to be a teacher in a school of the Alliance Israélite Universelle, a Paris-based organization for Jewish education. After three years, while still in Baghdad, he was hired to be a teacher and educator in the house of the exiled Persian pretender Naib al-Saltana, the brother of Nasir ad-Din, Shah of Persia.

In the winter of 1875–76, Obermeyer was chosen by the Persian prince Abbas Mirza Mulkara, the grandson of Abbas Mirza, to accompany them on a hunting trip. Obermeyer advised the party to go hunting in the region between the Euphrates and Tigris, where the two rivers run parallel to each other. The territory is a former Jewish-Babylonian main settlement from the beginning of the Babylonian exile, and the homeland of the Babylonian Talmud and the Gaonic academies. Obermeyer himself later reported, that he was completely indifferent to the hunt. Rather to him the central issue was to take a good look at the historical landscape from the time of the writing of the Babylonian Talmud, and at the sites where the Babylonian Amoraim unfolded their teaching. He gazed at the desolate ruins in the now-deserted steppe and after the dried canal runs, seeking to find connections to the geographical features described in the Talmud.

While in Baghdad Obermeyer published a series of articles in the monthly journal HaMaggid (Lyck 1876:20) criticising the Kabbalist and communal leader Hacham Yosef Hayyim and was excommunicated by the Hacham Bashi, his cherem being read in all the synagogues in Baghdad.

=== Return to Bavaria ===
After his return home in the summer of 1876 he published a series of articles entitled My trip to the ruins of Babylon in the Hebrew weekly HaMaggid.

=== Teacher of Persian royalty ===
From that time until his final return to Europe in 1884, Obermeyer often found the opportunity to travel even further through the scenery between the Euphrates and Tigris, and to explore and to extend his knowledge on the Babylonian Talmud. In the meantime the prince Abbas Mirza Mulkara reconciled with his brother and in 1881 returned to Persia. Obermeyer accompanied him first to Kaswin and then to Tehran, where he replaced the teacher in the house of the Persian prince.

=== Teacher in Vienna ===
In 1884 he received an invitation to come to Vienna as a teacher of Arabic and Persian language and literature at the Kaiserlich-Königliche Öffentliche Lehranstalt für Orientalische Sprachen (Imperial-Royal Public College of Oriental Languages, founded as part of the k.k. Akademie für Orientalische Sprachen), where he was active until 1915.

In 1907 he published the famous work Modern Judaism in Orient and Occident (German: Modernes Judentum im Morgen- und Abendland). This work treats with expertise many current problems of the Jewish life, and is filled with special interest to the author of the Tora Devoted (Hebrew: נאמני תורה) Judaism, in the spirit of which Obermeyer had led his whole life.

In 1929, at the age of 84, Obermeyer's life work The Babylonian Landscape in the era of the Talmud and the Gaonate was published. This work is an indispensable reference work on the geography of the Babylonian Talmud. It differs from the work of the predecessors in that apart from the use and support of previous writers of antiquity and Arab geographers and historians, it rests on Obermeyer's personal experience and on his own views of the sites and spots of Babylonia.

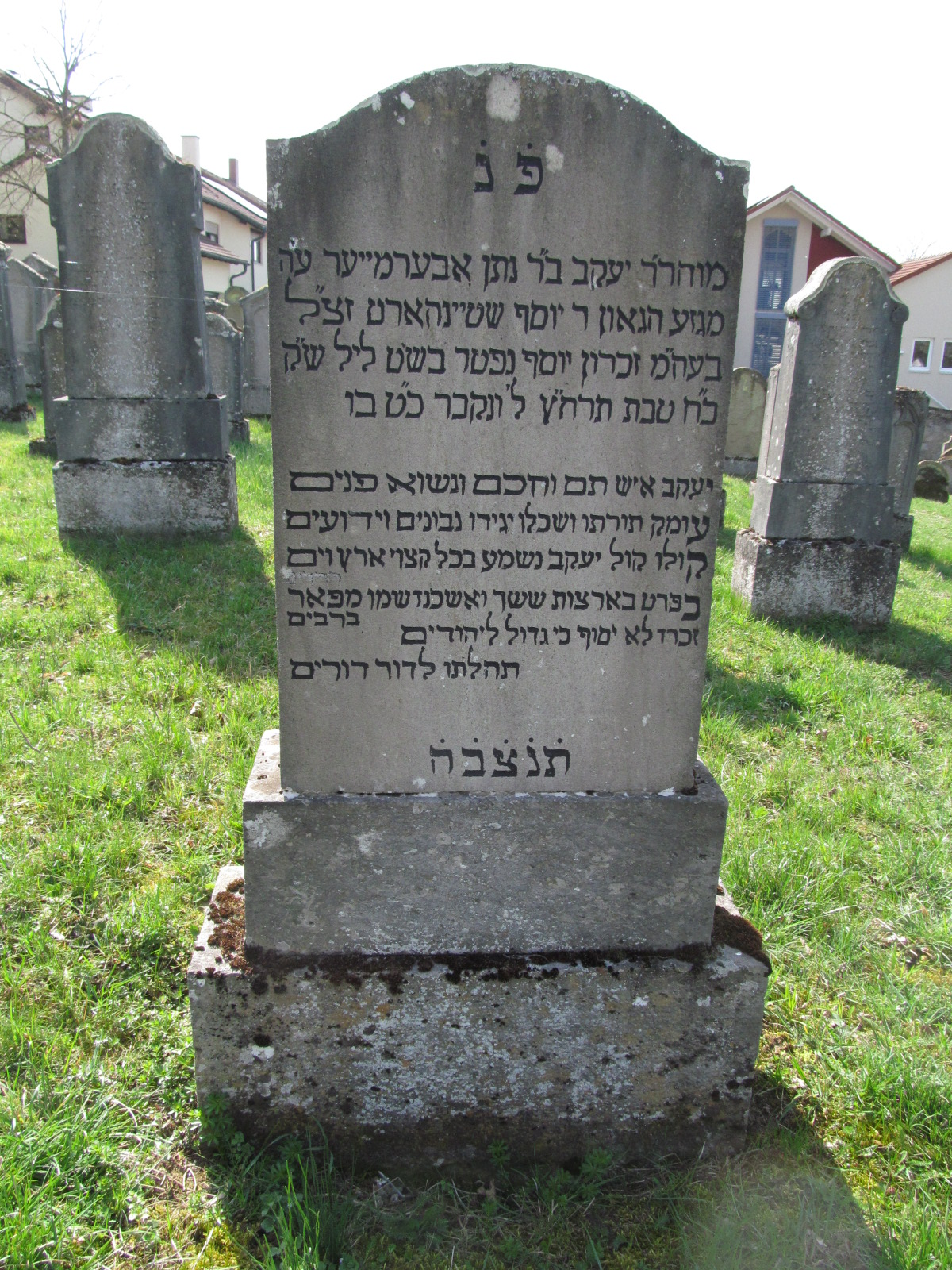
