= Tzippora Sharett =

Wife of the second prime minister of Israel, Moshe Sharett

- ציפורה שרת
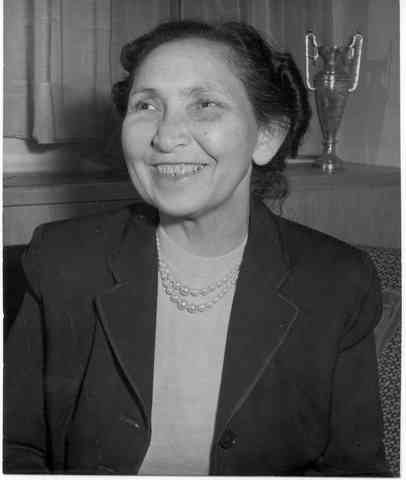
- Tzippora Sharett, 1955

Spouse of the Prime Minister of Israel
- In role 26 January 1954 – 3 November 1955
- Prime Minister: Moshe Sharett
- Preceded by: Paula Ben-Gurion
- Succeeded by: Paula Ben-Gurion

Personal details
- Born: Tzippora Meirov; 12 August 1896 Dvinsk, Russian Empire (now Daugavpils, Latvia)
- Died: 30 September 1973 (aged 77) Tel Aviv, Israel
- Spouse: Moshe Sharett (m. 1922; died 1965)
- Children: 3
- Education: Reading College

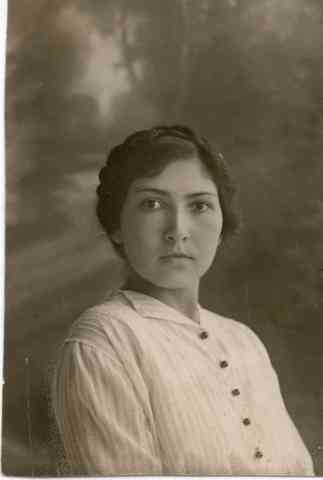
Tzippora Meirov, 1918

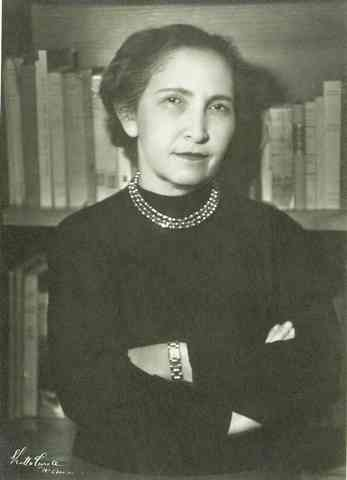
Tzippora Sharett, 1952

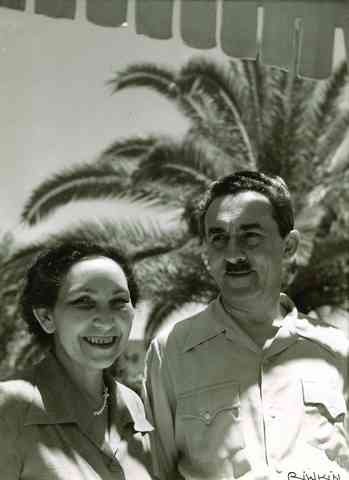
Tzippora and Moshe Sharett at the Foreign Minister's office in Tel Binyamin, Ramat Gan, 1953

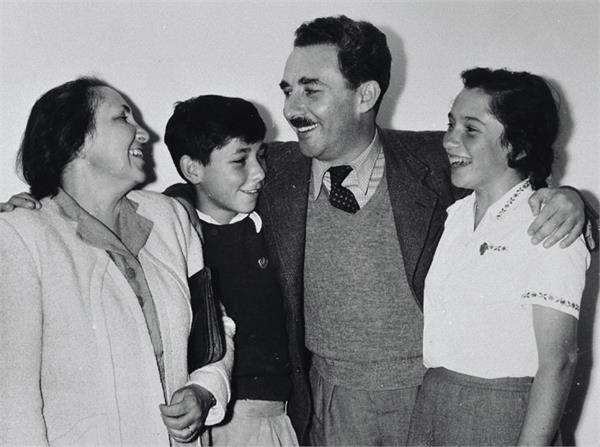
From right to left: Yael, Moshe, Haim and Tzippora Sharett, 1946

Tzippora Sharett (Hebrew: צפורה שרת; née Meirov; 12 August 1896 – 30 September 1973) was the wife of the second prime minister of Israel, Moshe Sharett.

She was born in Dvinsk, a city that was under the control of the Russian Empire at the time of her birth and is now Daugavpils, Latvia. In 1912, she made Aliya to Palestine with her family. While studying at the Hebrew Gymnasium, she met Moshe Sharett, one of the leaders of the Yishuv who later became the second Israeli prime minister and its first foreign minister, and in 1922 they married.

She supported her husband in all his diplomatic and political activities until his death in 1965. She died in 1973.

== Early life ==
Born Zippora Meirov in 1896 to Yehuda Meirov and Frida (née Meirovich) in Dvinsk in the Vitebsk region of the Russian Empire (now Daugavpils, Latvia) – a city that at that time almost half of its inhabitants were Jews. Her father was one of the "Lovers of Zion", and as a child she did not receive a primary education. Her younger brother is Shaul Avigur, one of the fighters of Tel Hai, one of the leaders of the Haganah, the commander of the Mossad LeAliyah Bet for most of its years, the deputy defence minister during the 1947–1949 Palestine war and the head of the Nativ organization.

In 1912, she immigrated to Palestine with almost no knowledge of the Hebrew language. Her family settled in Tel Aviv-Yafo, and Tzippora began her studies at the Hebrew Gymnasium. During her studies at the gymnasium, she met her future husband, Moshe Sharett. At that time he was a student, and was to become a senior diplomatic figure and the second Prime Minister of Israel. She knew Dov Hoz and Eliyahu Golomb, Sharett's best friends, and her closeness to the trio made her a partner in the political and diplomatic struggle for the establishment of the State of Israel from the dawn of her youth. This partnership is reflected in her life with Sharett, which culminated in her role as the wife of the Prime Minister of Israel.

Meirov and Sharett first got closer during a trip of the gymnasium for the students, on Passover 1913 in Hebron. A few years later, when Sharett was teaching Turkish, Meirov was one of his students and so the bond between the two became stronger. After getting to know each other in depth, they began to "date regularly".

In 1919, Meirov joined the Kinneret group, of which her brother Shaul was a member. She was one of the members of the Kvutzat Hashishim ("the Group of 60"), which engaged in agricultural work and contracting work, including the drying of the Jordan Valley' Swamp and the planting of eucalyptus trees.

== Marriage to Moshe Sharett ==
In 1921, Shertok's (later "Sharett") two sisters, Ada and Rivka, married his two closest friends – Dov Hoz and Eliyahu Golomb, his friends from the days of the gymnasium and the Histadrut metzumtzemet and one of the founders of the Haganah. Sharett waited another year before asking for the hand of Zippora, who had been his girlfriend since his youth.

== After marriage ==
A few months after her marriage, Zippora began studying agriculture at Reading College, two hours away from London, where she specialized in the dairy industry. According to her children, she wanted to study medicine, but the circumstances of those times led her to study agriculture instead. Due to the couple's dilapidated financial situation, the two rarely met or met during school vacations.

After the couple returned to Palestine in 1925, Zippora returned to her agricultural work. She ran the Meshek Hapoalot farm in Nahalat Yehuda and was active in the Tel Aviv Workers' Council. Two years later, in 1927, she gave birth to their eldest son, Yaakov. After birth she stopped her various jobs and made sure she devotes her time to her children and family. In 1931 her daughter Yael was born and in 1933 her son Haim was born.

== Wife of a politician ==
Her husband's entry into the political world practically stopped Zippora's professional career dream, and she devoted herself completely to whatever this kind of life demand alongside a party leader and statesman. Life alongside a Sharett did not end up with a symbolic role of hosting. In those years Zippora became a close partner and adviser to her husband in his diplomatic and political work.

As part of Sharett's role as head of the Jewish Agency's diplomatic department, he was often absent from the country for periods of weeks and even months, and the relationship between the two was mainly expressed the through exchange of love letters.

In October 1942, in the midst of World War II, Sharett travelled to Tehran on a mission from the Jewish Agency and the Youth Aliyah in order to help rescue about 900 orphaned Jewish children from Poland who wandered in Eastern Europe fleeing the horrors of war (known as "Tehran children"). As head of the Jewish Agency's Diplomatic Department, Sharett was involved in efforts to save them, and then the idea flashed in his mind to send his wife to the mission, who willingly accepted the mission. She arrived in Tehran for the purpose of running the orphanage, called the "Jewish Child's House", together with a group of Halutzim who came with the older Jewish refugees. No entry visas to Iran were issued to any other emissaries from Israel. The orphanage was run under conditions of severe shortage, especially of food, which its shortages was felt throughout Iran, and in a relentless effort to rescue more children from the hands of the priests and nuns.

On June 29, 1946, were the "Black Sabbath" events, during which her husband was arrested along with all the leaders of the Yishuv by the British Mandate authorities in Palestine and transferred to the Latrun detention camp. While detained in Latrun, Tzippora's role was to be the liaison between him and the Jewish Agency's management in Jerusalem and abroad.

In January 1947, two months after his release from detention in Latrun, Sharett travelled for a lengthy period of time to the United States as part of his position in the Jewish Agency's Diplomatic Department. He was later joined by his wife and their children, Haim and Yael.

In 1947, Sharett also added to her volunteer activities her role as a member of the board of directors of the Jerusalem Academy of Music and Dance. There, too, she tried to help as much as she could, especially in getting financial support and recognition from the establishment. She held this position from the day she was appointed until the day she died in 1973.

Unlike her predecessor as the wife of the Prime Minister of Israel, Paula Ben-Gurion, Tzippora was involved from a fairly early stage in public and volunteer activity, a work that continued even when she was the wife of the Prime Minister. In doing so, she set a precedent that almost all wives of prime ministers followed in the coming generations.

== Spouse of the prime minister of Israel ==
Tzippora's entry into the position of spouse of the prime minister of Israel was relatively smooth in light of her extensive experience as the wife of the head of the Jewish Agency's Political Department (1933–1948) and as the Foreign Minister's wife (1948–1954). Moreover, her predecessor in office, Paula Ben-Gurion left behind no behavioural legacy, which Tzippora could have adopted.

On January 26, 1954, her husband Moshe Sharett was elected prime minister and Tzippora began serving as the prime minister's wife. The change in her husband's status did not affect the pattern of behaviour between him and her and she remained a close partner and advisor in all his political affairs. She accompanied him to important meetings in the Knesset and Mapai Party and assisted him in writing speeches and in fact served as his support person. For example, in March 1954, Sharett was asked to deliver an obituary to Baron Edmond James de Rothschild in the Knesset plenum. The eulogy speech was written by Tzippora after Sharett failed to do so.

In parallel with her volunteer work among the new immigrants, she continued her public work for many organizations, a work that began even before she became the wife of the Prime Minister of Israel. On March 7, 1955, she organized celebrations of Purim in the Ma'abarot and villages in the Jerusalem Corridor.

== Spouse of a former prime minister ==
After her husband was forced to leave his post as prime minister, he continued to serve as foreign minister until June 1956. These months were very difficult for Moshe Sharett due to his murky and difficult relationship with David Ben-Gurion. Again he found an attentive ear in Tzippora. Despite her quiet and humble personality, Tzippora did not hesitate to voice her opinion about her husband's bitter rival, who had cut short his political career. An example of this is her reaction to Operation Kinneret, which Ben-Gurion initiated in December 1955, while she and her husband were in the United States. Upon her return to Israel, Tzippora harshly criticized Ben-Gurion's close aides, Yitzhak Navon and Teddy Kollek.

Over the months, Moshe Sharett's mood became increasingly bad, and his dependence on his wife increased. In September–November 1956, although he did not hold any official position, Moshe Sharett embarked on an official visit to Southeast Asia and the Far East on behalf of the Israeli government with the aim of establishing diplomatic relations with the various Asian countries. The journey was documented in the book Mashot b'Asia dedicated to Tzippora, "to whom that through the letters to her were the chapters of this diary recorded". During his stay in Asia, Sharett repeatedly emphasized the lack of Tzippora – in his book he wrote: "Again I miss Zipporah very much, whom I thought about and her absence in all the wonderful tour I did".

== The end of her days ==
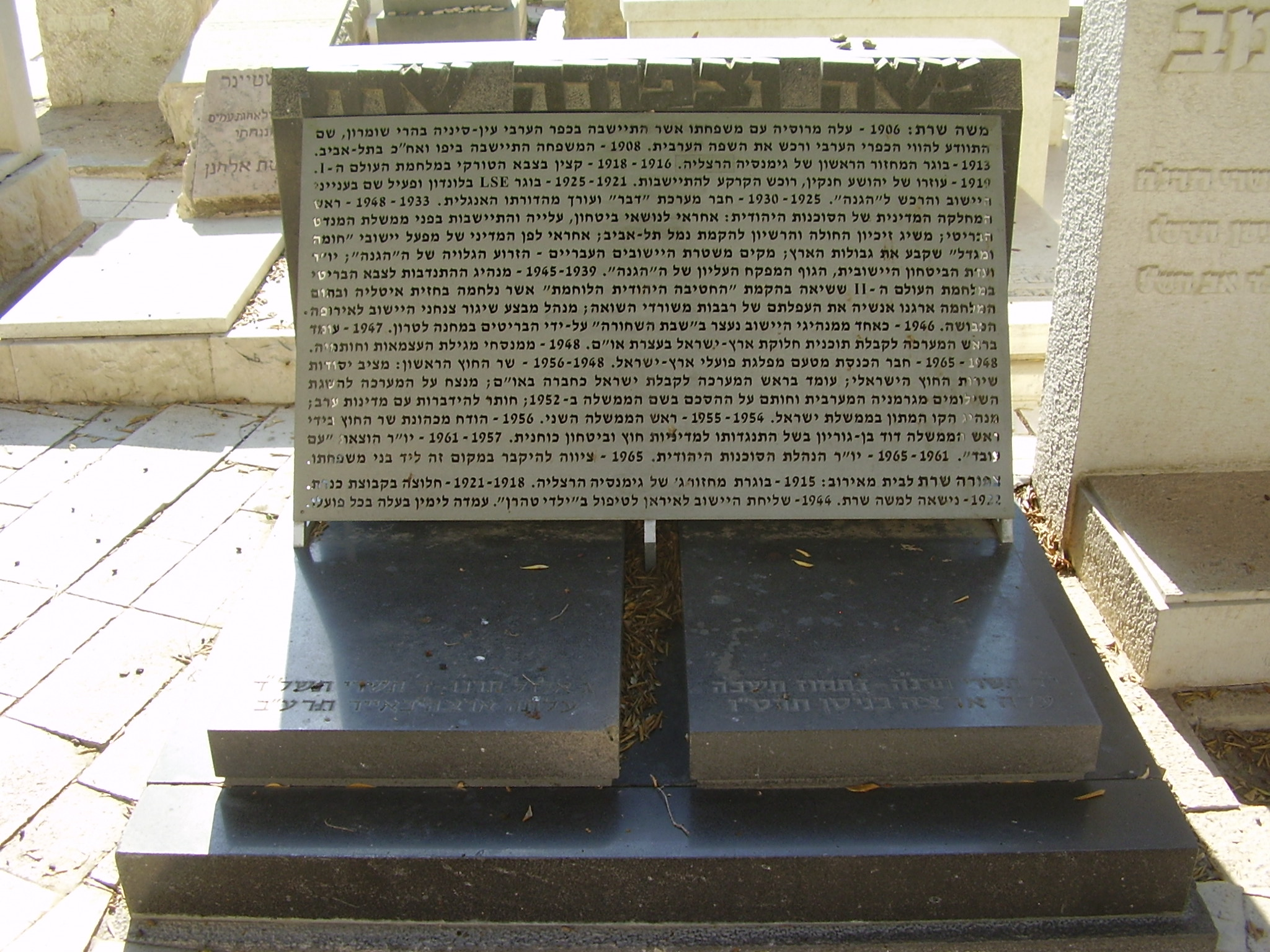
The graves of Tzippora and Moshe Sharett

In the years following her husband's death in 1965, Tzippora disappeared from the public eye almost completely. The only time she was seen in public after her husband's death was in 1970, when she received a medal of honor from the Jerusalem Municipality. In the following years, her health deteriorated and she died on September 30, 1973, at the age of 77 at the Tel Aviv Sourasky Medical Center in Tel Aviv. She was buried next to her husband in Trumpeldor Cemetery.
