= Pinhas Lavon =

Israeli politician (1904–1976)

- פנחס לבון
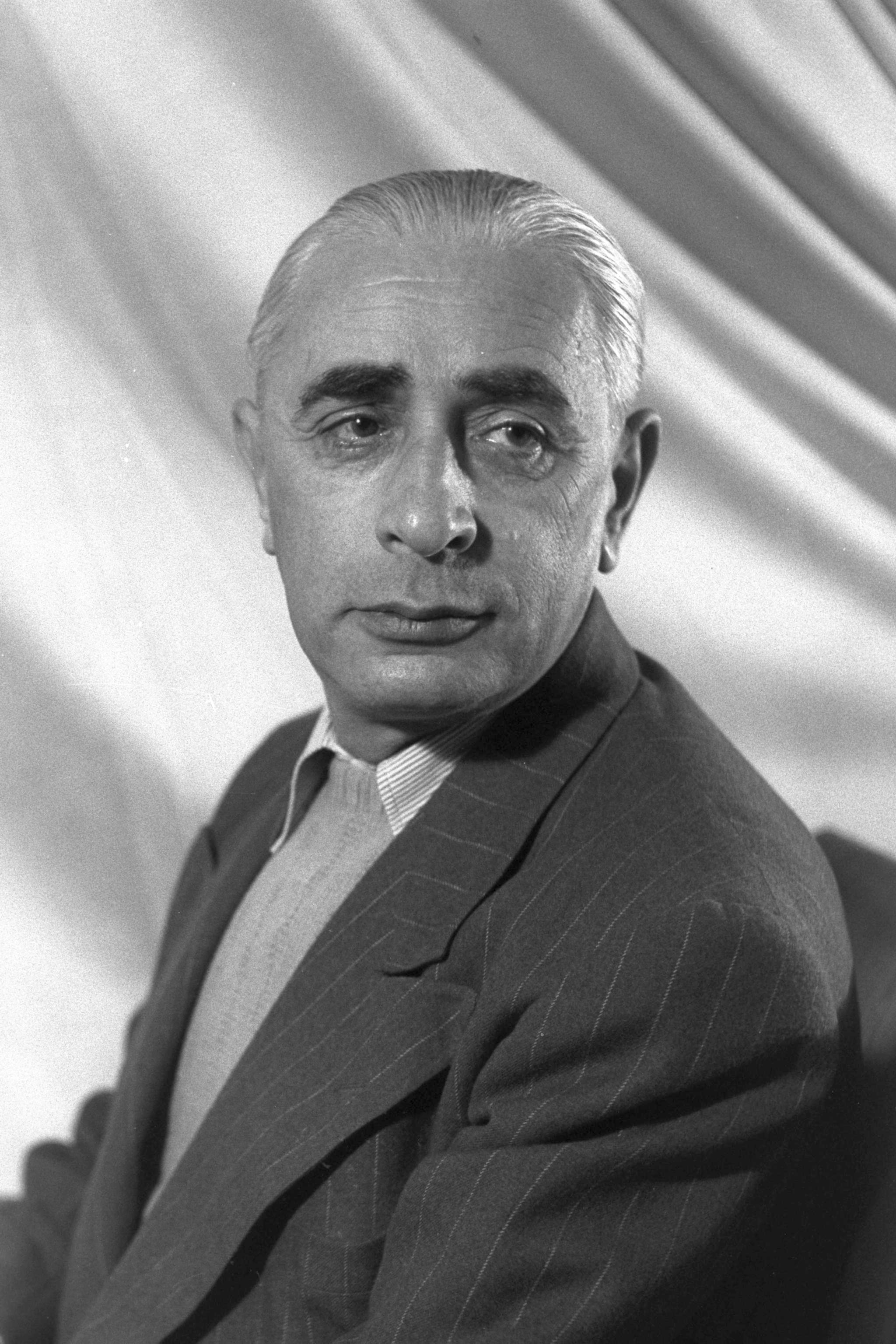
- Lavon in 1951

Ministerial portfolios
- 1950–1951: Agriculture
- 1952–1954: Without portfolio
- 1954–1955: Defense

Faction represented in the Knesset
- 1949–1961: Mapai

Personal details
- Born: 12 July 1904 Kopychyntsi, Austria-Hungary
- Died: 24 January 1976 (aged 71) Tel Aviv, Israel

Pinhas Lavon (Hebrew: פנחס לבון; 12 July 1904 – 24 January 1976) was an Austro-Hungarian–born Israeli politician, minister and labor leader, best known for the Lavon Affair.

== Early life ==
Lavon was born Pinhas Lubianiker in the small town of Kopychyntsi in the Galicia region of Austria-Hungary, now part of Ukraine. He studied law at the University of Lviv, where he organized Histadrut organizations in the region. In 1929, he immigrated to Mandatory Palestine.

== Political life ==
Lavon was elected to the first Knesset in 1949, and served briefly as the leader of the Histadrut in 1949–50. He was appointed Minister of Agriculture in David Ben-Gurion's second government.

He retained his seat in the 1951 elections, and in 1952 was appointed Minister without Portfolio. Following Ben-Gurion's resignation, he was appointed Minister of Defense in 1954.

However, he resigned from the cabinet after he was accused of authorizing an Israeli false flag operation in Egypt, which came to be known as the Lavon Affair.

Nevertheless, he remained an MK following elections in 1955 and 1959 and returned to the leadership of the Histadrut from 1956 to 1961. Lavon was later absolved of any involvement in the Egyptian bombings. He retired from public life in 1964 after a long-standing discord with Ben-Gurion and died in Tel Aviv in 1976.

During his tenure, Lavon strained relations with the Chief of Staff of the IDF Moshe Dayan by holding important policy meetings without Dayan being present, directly contacting IDF officers without following the established chain of command and attempting to scuttle Israeli purchases of arms from France.

The culmination came when Operation Susannah (as the Lavon affair was officially called) was launched when Dayan was out of the country. In his diaries, Israel's second prime minister, Moshe Sharett revealed that Lavon had proposed committing "atrocities" in the Gaza Strip, and spreading poisonous bacteria in the Israel-Syria Demilitarised Zone.

These were not implemented after Dayan and his predecessor Mordechai Maklef protested to Sharett.
