= Lavon Affair =

1954 Israeli false flag operation in Egypt

Operation Susannah
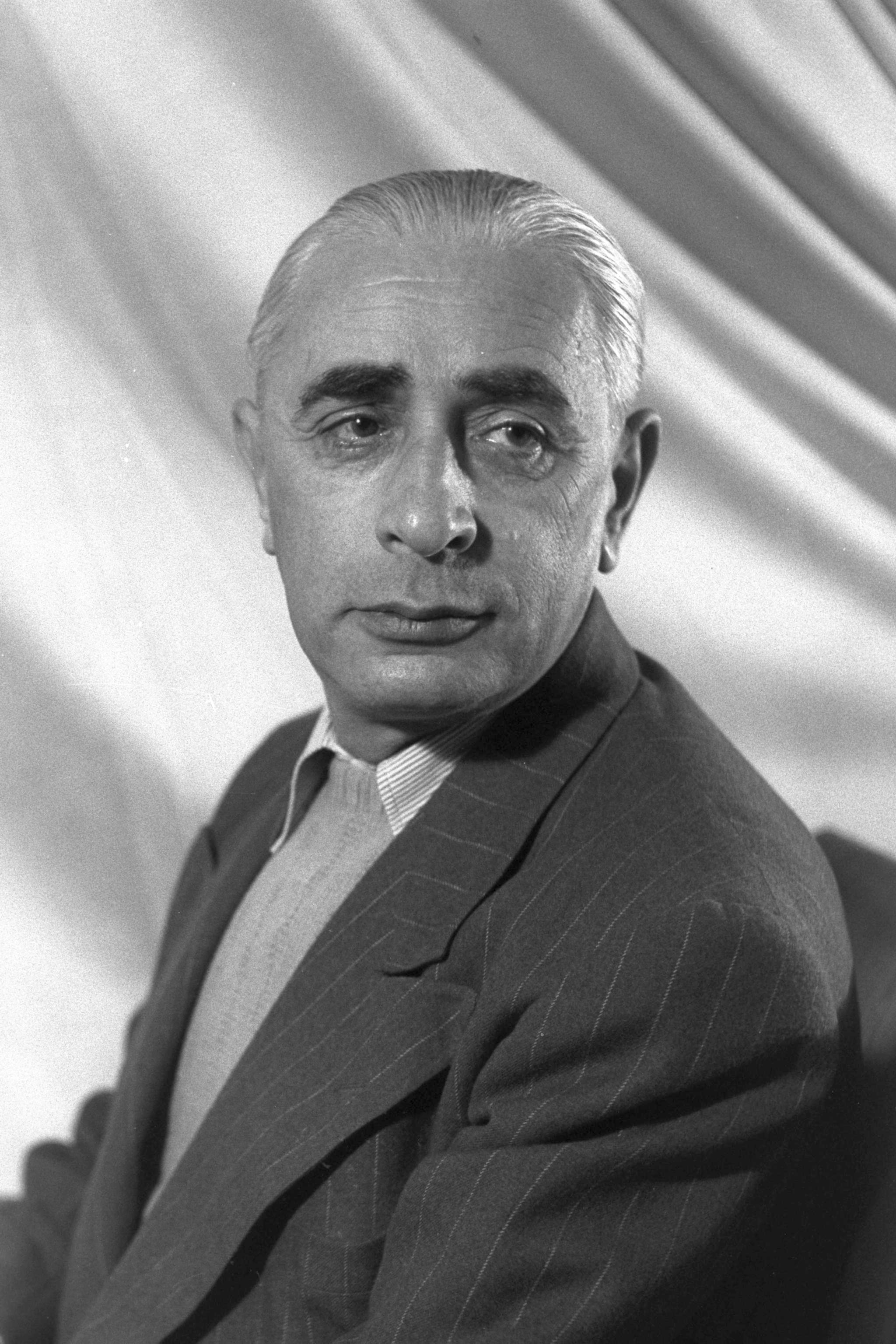
- Pinhas Lavon, Israeli defence minister
- Type: Covert and False flag operation
- Location: Egypt
- Planned by: Israeli Military Intelligence
- Target: Egyptian, American, and British-owned civilian targets
- Date: Summer of 1954
- Outcome: Israeli operational failure; Imprisonment and execution of most of the operatives; Resignation of Pinhas Lavon; Deterioration of Israel–United Kingdom relations; Deterioration of Israel–United States relations
- Casualties: Four Israeli operatives killed (two executed and two died by suicide); 5 Israeli operatives imprisoned

The Lavon affair was a failed Israeli covert operation, codenamed Operation Susannah, conducted in Egypt in the summer of 1954. As part of a false flag operation, a group of Egyptian Jews were recruited by Israeli military intelligence to plant bombs inside Egyptian-, American-, and British-owned civilian targets: cinemas, libraries, and American educational centers. The attacks were to be blamed on the Muslim Brotherhood, Egyptian communists, "unspecified malcontents", or "local nationalists" with the aim of creating a climate of sufficient violence and instability to induce the British government to retain its occupying troops in Egypt's Suez Canal zone. The operation caused no casualties among the population, but resulted in the deaths of four operatives. The overseer of the operation allegedly informed the Egyptians, after which 11 suspected operatives were arrested. Two died by suicide after being captured, two were executed by the Egyptian authorities, two of them were acquitted at trial, and the remaining five received prison terms ranging from 7 years to life in prison.

The operation ultimately became known as the "Lavon affair" after the Israeli defense minister Pinhas Lavon, who was forced to resign as a consequence of the incident. Before Lavon's resignation, the incident had been euphemistically referred to in Israel as the "Unfortunate Affair" or "The Bad Business" (Hebrew: העסק הביש, HaEsek HaBish). Israel publicly denied any involvement in the incident until 2005, when the surviving agents were awarded certificates of appreciation by Israeli President Moshe Katsav.

== Operation Susannah ==
=== Aim ===
In the early 1950s, the United States initiated a more activist policy of support for Egyptian nationalism; this aim was often in contrast with Britain's policy of maintaining its regional hegemony. Israel feared that the US policy, which encouraged Britain to withdraw its military forces from the Suez Canal, would embolden the military ambitions of Egyptian president Gamal Abdel Nasser towards Israel. Israel at first sought to influence this policy through diplomatic means, but was frustrated.

In the summer of 1954, Colonel Binyamin Gibli, the chief of Israel's military intelligence directorate Aman, initiated 'Operation Susannah' in order to reverse that decision. The goal of the Operation was to carry out bombings and other acts of sabotage in Egypt, with the aim of creating an atmosphere in which Anglo-American opponents of the British withdrawal from Egypt would be able to gain the upper hand and block the withdrawal.

According to historian Shabtai Teveth, who wrote one of the more detailed accounts, the assignment was "To undermine Western confidence in the existing Egyptian regime by generating public insecurity and actions to bring about arrests, demonstrations, and acts of revenge, while totally concealing the Israeli factor. The team was accordingly urged to avoid detection, so that suspicion would fall on the Muslim Brotherhood, the Communists, 'unspecified malcontents' or 'local nationalists'."

=== Secret cell ===
The top-secret cell which was to carry out the operation, Unit 131, had existed since 1948 and under Aman since 1950. At the time of Operation Susannah, Unit 131 was the subject of a bitter dispute between Aman (military intelligence) and Mossad (national intelligence agency) over who should control it.

Unit 131 operatives had been recruited several years earlier, when the Israeli intelligence officer Avraham Dar arrived in Cairo under the cover of a British citizen from Gibraltar named John Darling. He had recruited several Egyptian Jews, known as sayanim (Hebrew: סייענים), who had also previously been active in helping Jews flee to Israel, activities that Egypt deemed illegal, and trained them for covert operations.

=== Operation commenced ===
Aman decided to activate the network in the spring of 1954. On 2 July, the cell detonated bombs at a post office in Alexandria, and on 14 July, it bombed the libraries of the U.S. Information Agency in Alexandria and Cairo, and a British-owned theater. The homemade bombs, consisting of bags containing acid placed over nitroglycerine, were inserted into books and placed on the shelves of the libraries just before closing time. Several hours later, as the acid ate through the bags, the bombs would explode. They did little damage to the targets and caused no injuries or deaths.

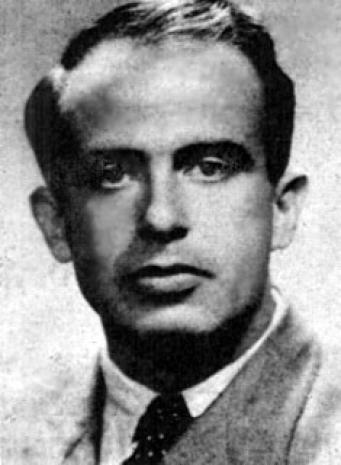
Meir Max Bineth

Before the group began the operation, Israeli agent Avri Elad (Avraham Seidenberg) was sent to oversee the operations. Elad assumed the identity of Paul Frank, a former SS officer with Nazi underground connections. Avri Elad allegedly informed the Egyptians, resulting in the Egyptian intelligence agency following a suspect to his target, the Rio Theatre, where a fire engine was standing by. Egyptian authorities arrested this suspect, Philip Natanson, when his bomb accidentally ignited prematurely in his pocket. Having searched his apartment, they found incriminating evidence and names of accomplices to the operation.

Eleven suspects were arrested by the Egyptian State Security, including Egyptian Jews and undercover Israelis. Elad and Colonel Dar managed to escape. Two suspects, Yosef Carmon and Israeli Meir Max Bineth, died by suicide in prison.

== Trials and jail ==
The Egyptian trial began on 11 December and lasted until 27 January 1955; two of the accused (Moshe Marzouk and Shmuel Azar) were sentenced to death by hanging, two were acquitted, and the rest received lengthy prison terms ranging from 7 years to life in prison.

In 1954, on behalf of both Winston Churchill and the World Jewish Congress, Maurice Orbach went to Cairo to intercede for the lives of those sentenced to death. Later, he said that Egypt's president, Nasser, had agreed to spare their lives but then reneged on this, balancing their deaths with those of members of the Muslim Brotherhood.

The trial was criticised in Israel as a show trial, although strict Israeli military censorship of the press at the time meant that the Israeli public was kept in the dark about the facts of the case, and in fact were led to believe that the defendants were innocent.

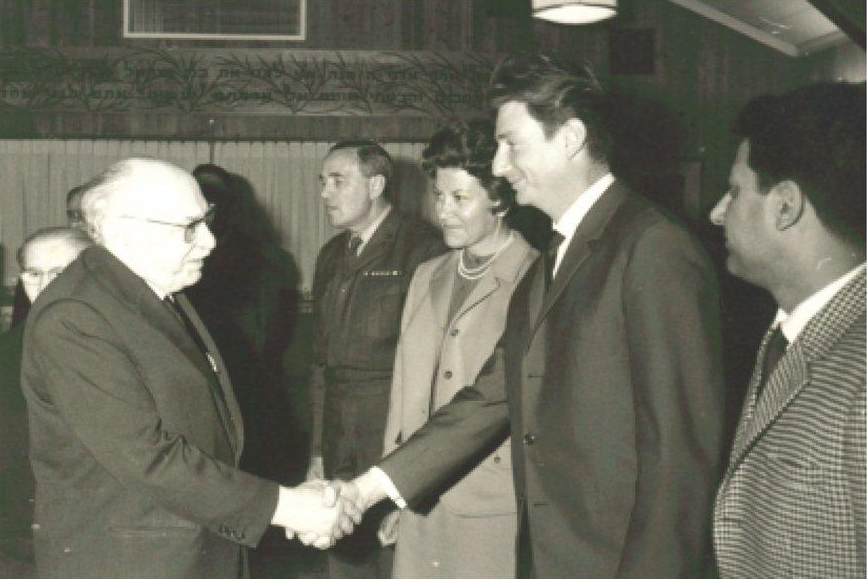
Ιsraeli president Zalman Shazar meets with the released operatives in 1968, including (from right to left): Robert Dessa, Philip Nathanson, and Marcelle Ninio.

After serving seven-year jail sentences, two of the imprisoned operatives (Meir Meyuhas and Meir Za'afran) were released in 1962. The rest were eventually freed in February 1968, including Marcelle Ninio, in a secret addendum to a prisoner-of-war exchange.

Soon after the affair, Mossad chief Isser Harel expressed suspicion to Aman concerning the integrity of Avri Elad. Despite his concerns, Aman continued using Elad for intelligence operations until 1956, when he was caught trying to sell Israeli documents to the Egyptians. Elad was tried in Israel and sentenced to 10 years imprisonment. During his imprisonment in Ayalon Prison, the media were only able to refer to him as the "Third Man" or "X" due to government censorship. In 1976, while living in Los Angeles, Elad publicly identified himself as the "Third Man" from the Lavon Affair. In 1980, Harel publicly revealed evidence that Elad had been turned by the Egyptians even before Operation Susannah.

== Political aftermath ==
=== Denial and first inquiry ===
In meetings with the prime minister Moshe Sharett, minister of defense Pinhas Lavon denied any knowledge of the operation. When intelligence chief Gibli contradicted Lavon, Sharett commissioned a board of inquiry consisting of Israeli Supreme Court Justice Isaac Olshan and the first chief of staff of the Israel Defense Forces, Yaakov Dori that was unable to find conclusive evidence that Lavon had authorized the operation. Lavon tried to fix the blame on Shimon Peres, who was the secretary general of the defense ministry, and on Gibli for insubordination and criminal negligence.

Sharett resolved the dilemma by siding with Peres (who had, along with Moshe Dayan, testified against Lavon), after which Lavon resigned on 17 February 1955. Former prime minister David Ben-Gurion succeeded Lavon as minister of defense. On 3 November 1955, Sharett (who had not known about the operation in advance, and had therefore strongly denied Israel's involvement) resigned as Prime Minister and was replaced by Ben-Gurion.

=== Subsequent revelations and inquiries ===
In April 1960, a review of minutes from the inquiry found inconsistencies and possibly a fraudulent document in Gibli's original testimony that seemed to support Lavon's account of events. During this time it came to light that Elad (the Israeli agent running Operation Susannah in Egypt) had committed perjury during the original inquiry. Elad was also suspected of betraying the group to Egyptian authorities, though the charges were never proven. He was eventually sentenced to a jail term of 10 years for trying to sell Israeli documents to the Egyptians in an unrelated matter. Ben-Gurion scheduled closed hearings with a new board of inquiry chaired by Haim Cohn, a Supreme Court justice.

This inquiry found that the perjury indeed had been committed, and that Lavon had not authorized the operation. Sharett and Levi Eshkol tried to issue a statement that would placate both Lavon and those who had opposed him. Ben-Gurion refused to accept the compromise, and viewed it as a divisive play within the Mapai party.

Another investigative committee took up the matter and sided with the Cohn inquiry. Ben-Gurion then resigned from his post as defense minister. This led to the expulsion of Lavon from the Histadrut labor union and an early call for new elections, the results of which changed the political structure in Israel. The specifics of Operation Susannah were kept secret from the Israeli public at the time of the political upheaval.

=== Public debate ===
Due to Israel's military censorship the details of the affair could originally not be openly discussed in the media. Despite this, debate occurred but with the use of code words such as the "Senior Officer", to refer to Gibli, and the "unfortunate business" to refer to the Egyptian operation.

== Legacy ==
Operation Susannah and the Lavon Affair turned out to be disastrous for Israel in several ways:

- Israel lost significant standing and credibility in its relations with the United Kingdom and the United States, that took years to repair.
- The aftermath saw considerable political turmoil in Israel, which affected the influence of its government.

Israel publicly honored the surviving spies on March 30, 2005; President Moshe Katsav presented each with a certificate of appreciation for their efforts on behalf of the state, ending decades of official denial by Israel.
