= Naama Issachar affair =

Israeli citizen arrested in Russia in 2019

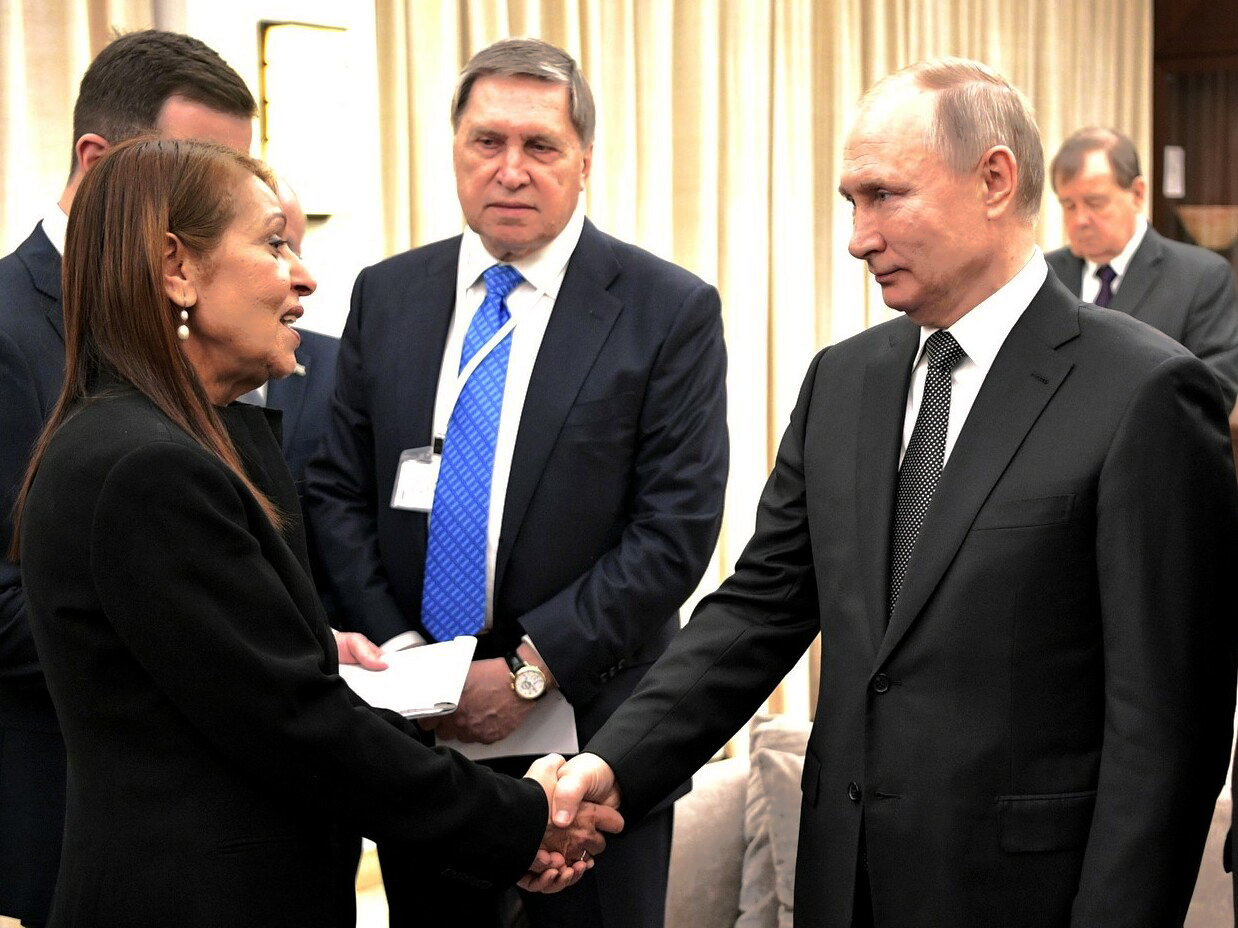
Yafa Issachar (left), mother of Naama Issachar, meets with Benjamin Netanyahu and Vladimir Putin during Putin's visit to Israel on January 23, 2020

In April 2019 in Sheremetyevo International Airport, Russian authorities arrested Israeli-American Naama Issachar (Hebrew: נעמה יששכר), a transit passenger flying from India to Israel, for alleged drug smuggling after some 10 grams (⅓ oz) of marijuana or hashish were found in her bag during a stopover in Moscow. On 11 October 2019, a Russian court sentenced her to seven and a half years in prison on drug possession and smuggling charges. Issachar's family and Israeli officials said that Russia told them she would be released if Aleksey Burkov (Russian: Алексей Бурков), a Russian national pending extradition from Israel to the United States on suspicion of committing cyber crimes, was released to Russia. Israeli prime minister Benjamin Netanyahu subsequently personally requested from Russian president Vladimir Putin a pardon for Issachar, which Putin said he would consider. Israel's High Court ultimately rejected Burkov's appeal against his extradition, leading Russia to condemn the decision as "a breach ... of Israel's international obligations", stating that the decision "does not contribute to the development of [Russian-Israeli] relations".

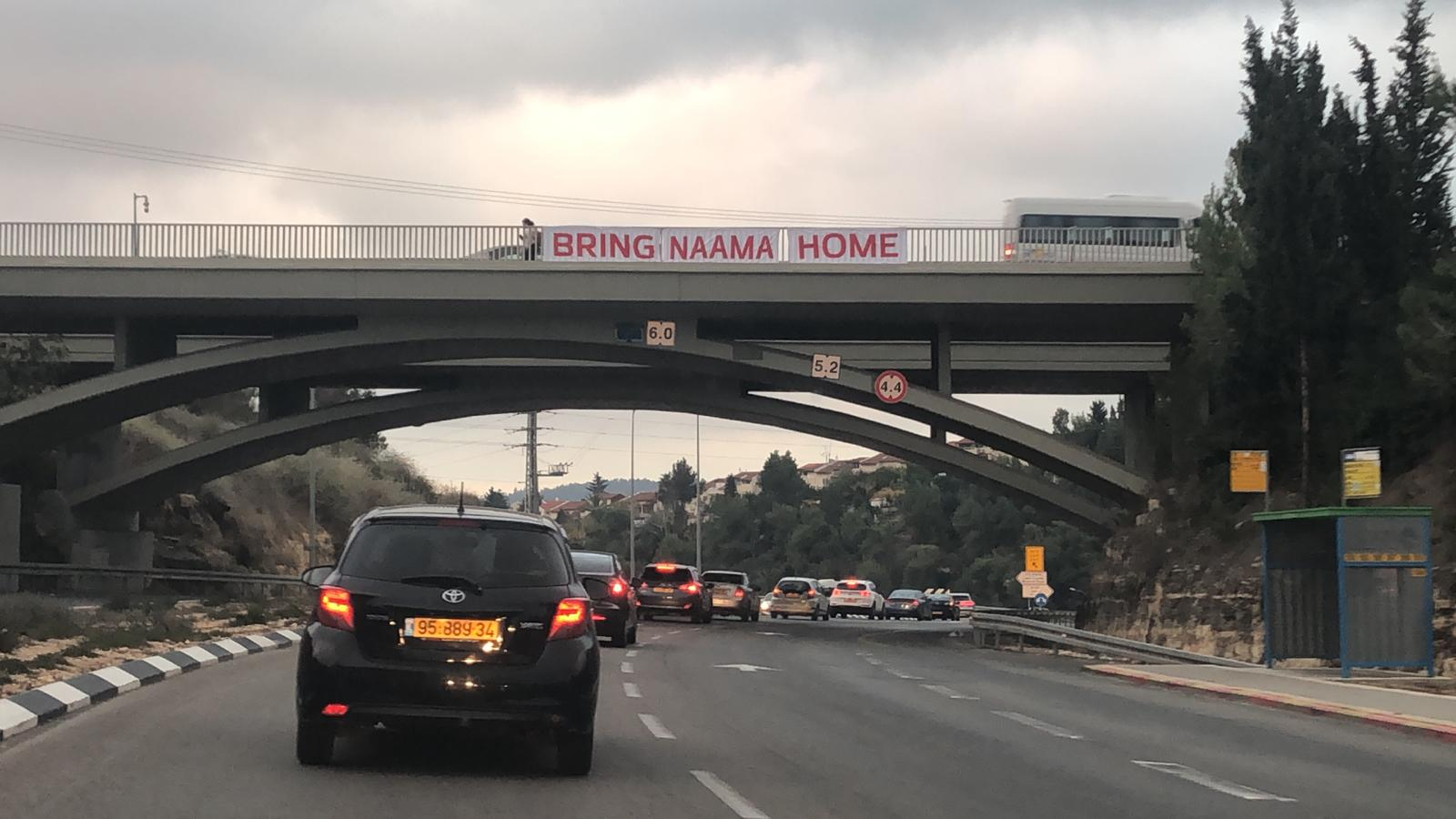
Road sign over Israeli Highway 1 calling for the release of Naama Issachar

On 19 October 2019, rallies were held in Tel Aviv and New York City calling for Issachar's release. Billboards were put up in Israel calling on Putin to "please bring Naama home."

In December 2019, the Israeli Justice Ministry transferred the historical Alexander's Courtyard in Jerusalem to the Putin-allied Imperial Orthodox Palestine Society from the competing Imperial Orthodox Palestine Historic Society, which many commentators linked to negotiating Issachar's release. On 29 January 2020, Putin signed her pardon. Her attorney previously noted that no convicted foreigner was ever pardoned by a Russian president before.

== See also ==
- Israel–Russia relations
- Ilan Grapel affair
- Brittney Griner - an American citizen detained in Russia on similar charges
