= Moshe Marzouk =

Egyptian spy

Moshe Marzouk

Moshe Marzouk (Hebrew: משה מרזוק; or Musa Lieto Marzuk, Arabic: موسى ليتو مرزوق; born 20 December 1926 – 31 January 1955) was an Egyptian Karaite Jew, who was hanged in 1955 for his involvement in a series of bombings in Cairo codenamed Operation Suzannah.

Marzouk was born in Cairo to a Karaite family who had emigrated from Tunisia in the early 20th century, though they retained French citizenship. While working as a surgeon at the Jewish Hospital in Cairo in the early 1950s, he was recruited as a spy by Israeli military intelligence, along with other young Egyptian Jews. In 1954 the group carried out a series of bombings, targeting the post office in Alexandria, two libraries in Cairo and Alexandria, and a movie theatre. There were no casualties. These actions triggered an Israeli political crisis later known as the Lavon Affair. Marzouk and his group were caught and tried by the SSIS, during which time they were allegedly tortured. Marzouk was executed in a Cairo prison. His remains were brought to Jerusalem and buried on Mount Herzl.

== See also ==
- Lavon Affair
- History of the Jews in Egypt
