= Timeline of the Egyptian Crisis under the SCAF =

2011-2012 Egypt protests
- Part of the Egyptian Crisis
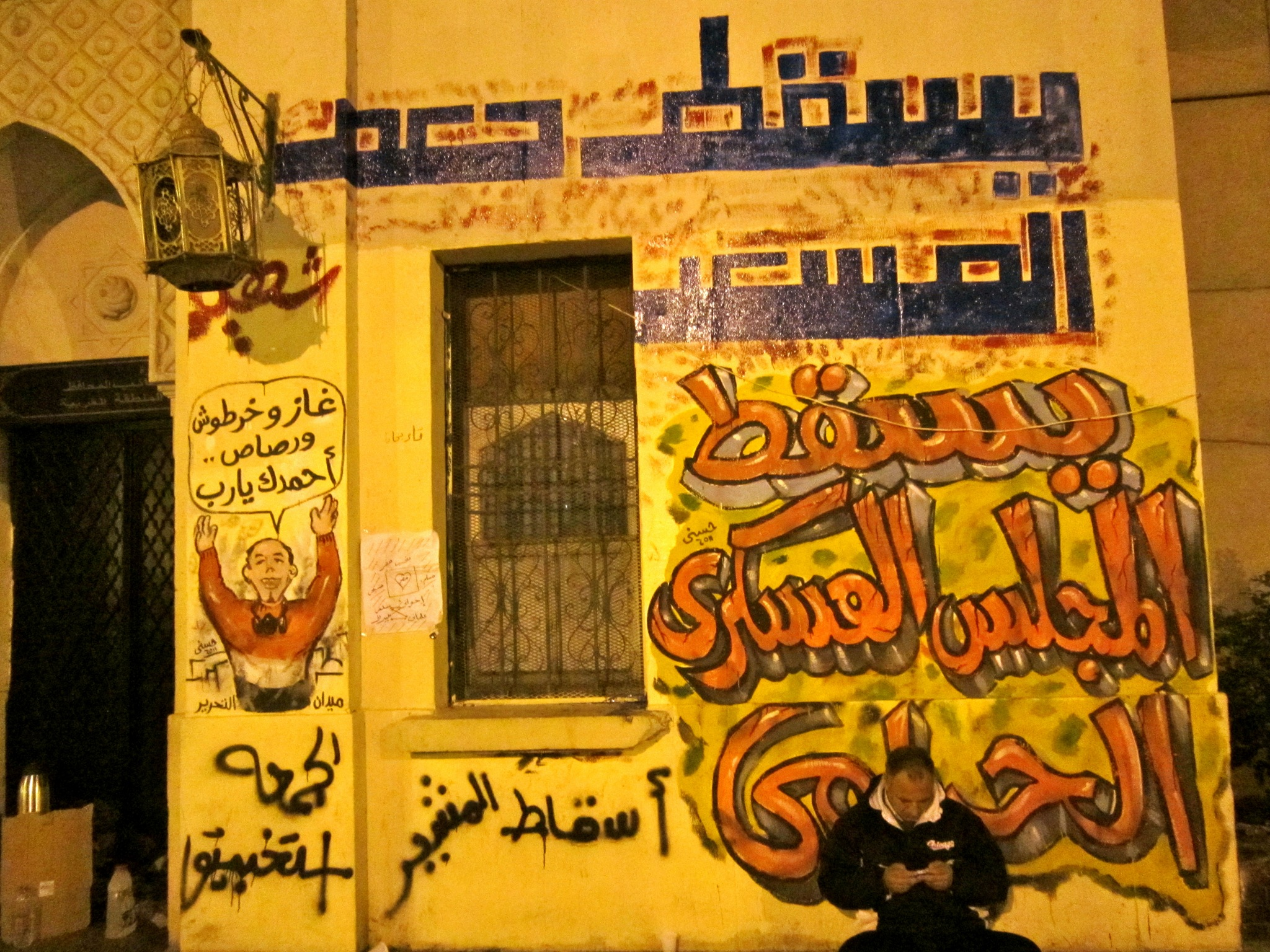
- Down with military rule (graffiti)
- Date: 12 February 2011 – 30 June 2012
- Location: Egypt; 30°2′N 31°13′E
- Methods: Civil disobedience; Civil resistance; Demonstrations; Riots; Strike actions; Online activism

Casualties
- Deaths: 300+ people
- Injuries: More than 3,702 people
- Arrested: 13,000

The following is a chronological summary of the major events that occurred during the Egyptian Revolution of 2011, after Hosni Mubarak's resignation. Protests and riots led to the deaths of hundreds, injuries of thousands and the arrests of tens of thousands. Millions have mobilised the streets since the revolution.

== 2011 ==
=== February ===
==== 12–15 February ====
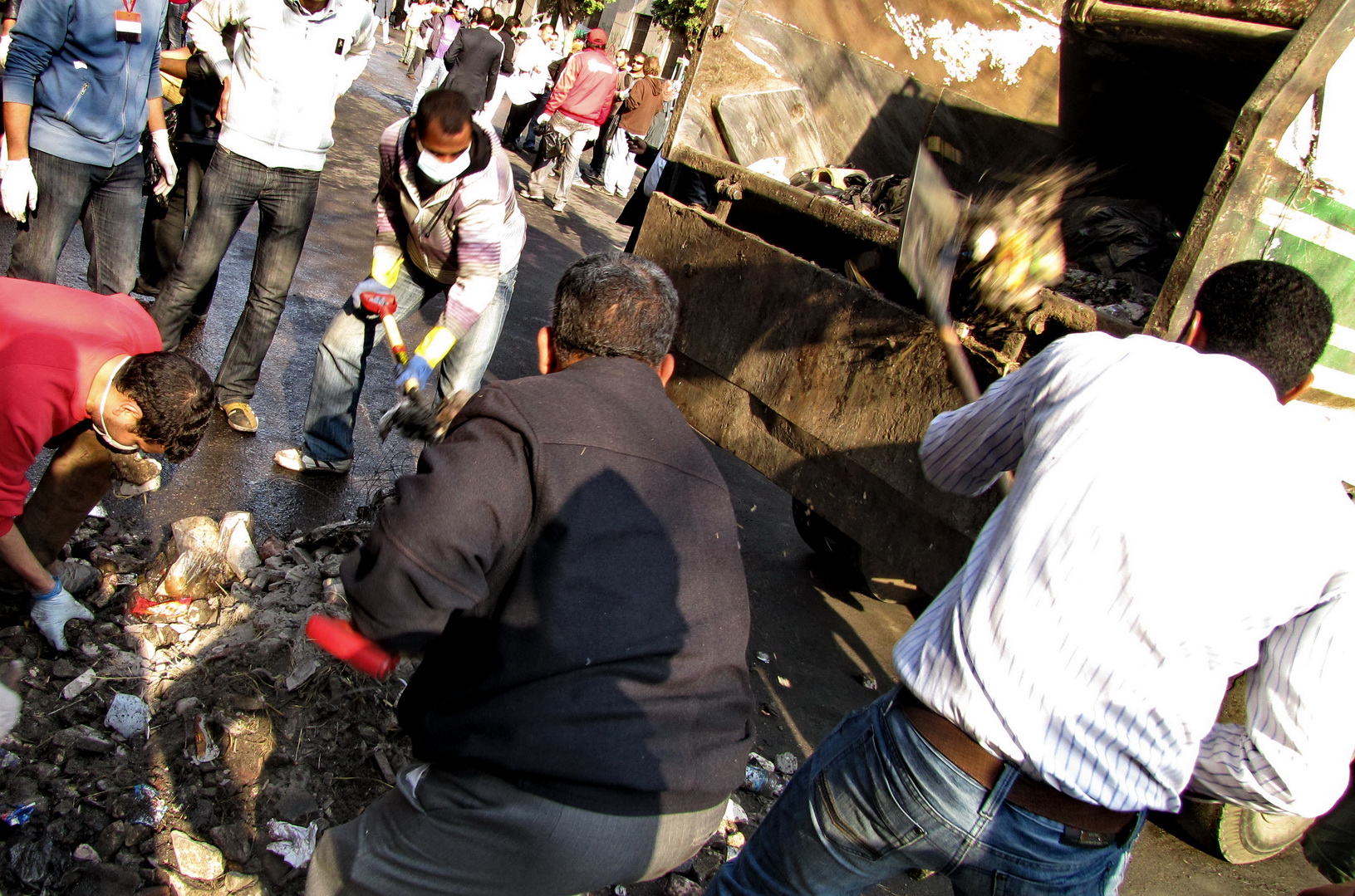
Volunteers use shovels to dispose rubble, debris, and trash.

People celebrating on the streets of Cairo

A group of activists issued the "People's Communiqué No 1", which imitated the titles of communiqués from the Army. It demanded the dissolution of the cabinet Mubarak appointed on 29 January, the suspension of the parliament elected in late 2010 in a poll that was widely suspected of being rigged, the creation of a transitional presidential council made up of four civilians and one member of the military, the formation of a transitional government to prepare for an election to take place within nine months and a body to draft a new democratic constitution, freedom for the media and syndicates and for the formation of political parties, and the scrapping of military and emergency courts. They also announced the formation of a council to organize mass protests. Curfew was reduced to between midnight and 6:00 Eastern European Time. The Supreme Council of the Armed Forces issued "Communiqué no. 4" in which they "promised to hand power to an elected, civilian government ... [and] also pledged that Egypt would remain committed to all international treaties." Minister of Information, Anas El-Fekky, had been placed under house arrest, and later resigned from his position.

Egypt's stock market regulator said the trading, which was due to start on 13 February, was delayed until 16 February.

Thousands of people also began to clean up Cairo's Tahrir Square, which had been disfigured by 18 days of rallies and sporadic street battles.

The army stated that the constitution was suspended and parliament was dissolved and that it would stay in power until the presidential and parliamentary elections could be held. The High Council of Egyptian Armed Forces had selected its chief to represent the council. The caretaker cabinet appointed by Mubarak would remain until a new cabinet was formed after the elections.

Police in the city of Bani Suef were protesting for better pay and more rights by lying down on a bridge. Hundreds of police also marched in Tahrir Square to show solidarity with the protesters. Waving Egyptian flags, the police demonstrators shouted, "We and the people are one", and said they wanted to "honor the martyrs of the revolution".

Jean-Claude Juncker, the chairman of the Eurogroup, said he would support a freeze on the assets of Hosni Mubarak.

After an inventory was completed, it was determined that a total of 18 artifacts from the Egyptian Museum were missing. About 70 objects were damaged.

It was reported that the secretary-general of the Arab League, Amr Moussa, was to stand down and run in the upcoming elections.

Eight representatives from the demonstrators, including Wael Ghonim and Amr Salama, met with spokespersons of the military and reported that there would be a referendum on changes to the constitution within two months.

Military rulers called for an end to the strikes and protests. Thousands of state employees, including police, transit workers, and ambulance drivers, protested for better pay. In a statement, the ruling military council issued a final warning to the labor unions stating that the armed forces could intervene. They also imposed an outright ban on gatherings and strikes. In addition, the army cleared out most of the remaining demonstrators from Tahrir Square.

Tarek El-Bishry, a retired judge known for his pro-opposition views and his support for a strong independent judiciary, was tasked with setting up the committee to reform the constitution. The changes would be formally announced within ten days. Adly Fayed, the director of public security at the interior ministry, and Ismail El Shaer, Cairo's security chief, have been fired over their decision to open fire on the demonstrators.

Hillary Clinton has told Al Jazeera that the US is hopeful that Egypt will become a model for democracy in the region.

Amr Moussa announced on 15 February that he would run in the presidential election. The Muslim Brotherhood announced on the same day that it would form the Freedom and Justice Party to run in the parliamentary elections.

==== 16–28 February ====
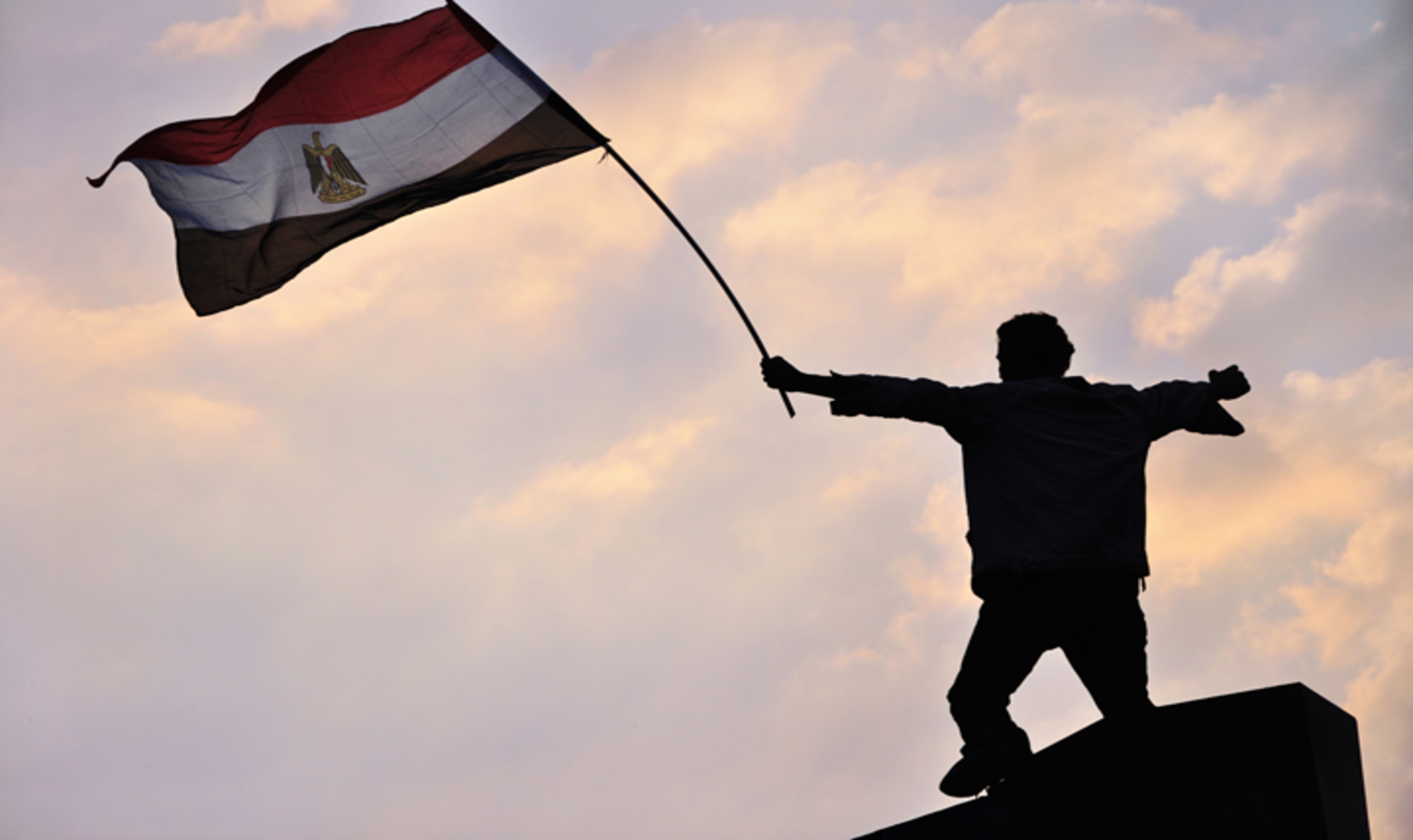
One of the protestors waving the Egyptian Flag during the protests in Tahrir Square, Cairo

On 17 February, the army stated that it would not field a candidate in the upcoming presidential elections. Four important figures of the former regime were detained on that day: former interior minister Habib el-Adly, former minister of housing Ahmed Maghrabi, former tourism minister Zuheir Garana, and steel tycoon Ahmed Ezz.

On 18 February, Muslim cleric Yusuf al-Qaradawi arrived in Egypt after his exile in Qatar and led the "Victory Day" Friday sermon in Tahrir Square, which was attended by hundreds of thousands of people. Men, who appeared to be Qaradawi's guards, barred Wael Ghonim from joining him on stage. On that same day, Wael Ghonim wrote the following on his Twitter: "I loved Sheikh Qaradawi Khutbah today. Was truly inspired when he said: 'Today I'm going to address both Muslims and Christians. Respect!'"

On 20 February, the constitutional reform committee stated that its work was almost done, and also announced that the caretaker government would soon be reshuffled. On 21 February, David Cameron, Prime Minister of the United Kingdom, became the first world leader to visit Egypt since Mubarak was ousted as the president. A news blackout was lifted as the prime minister landed in Cairo for a brief five-hour stopover, which had been hastily added to the start of a planned tour of the Middle East.

A government reshuffle took place on 22 February, but the defense, interior, foreign, finance, and justice ministries remained unchanged. New ministers included Yehia el-Gamal as deputy prime minister, the New Wafd Party's Monir Fakhri Abdel Nour as tourism minister, the Tagammu Party's Gowdat Abdel-Khaleq as minister of social solidarity and social justice, and Ismail Ibrahim Fahmy as the new labor minister. The changes were not well-received by the public, because most of Mubarak's former supporters remained in the cabinet, and there were renewed calls for a demonstration to demand the resignation of the interim government. Protesters were also set to return to Tahrir Square to keep up the pressure on the interim government.

=== March ===
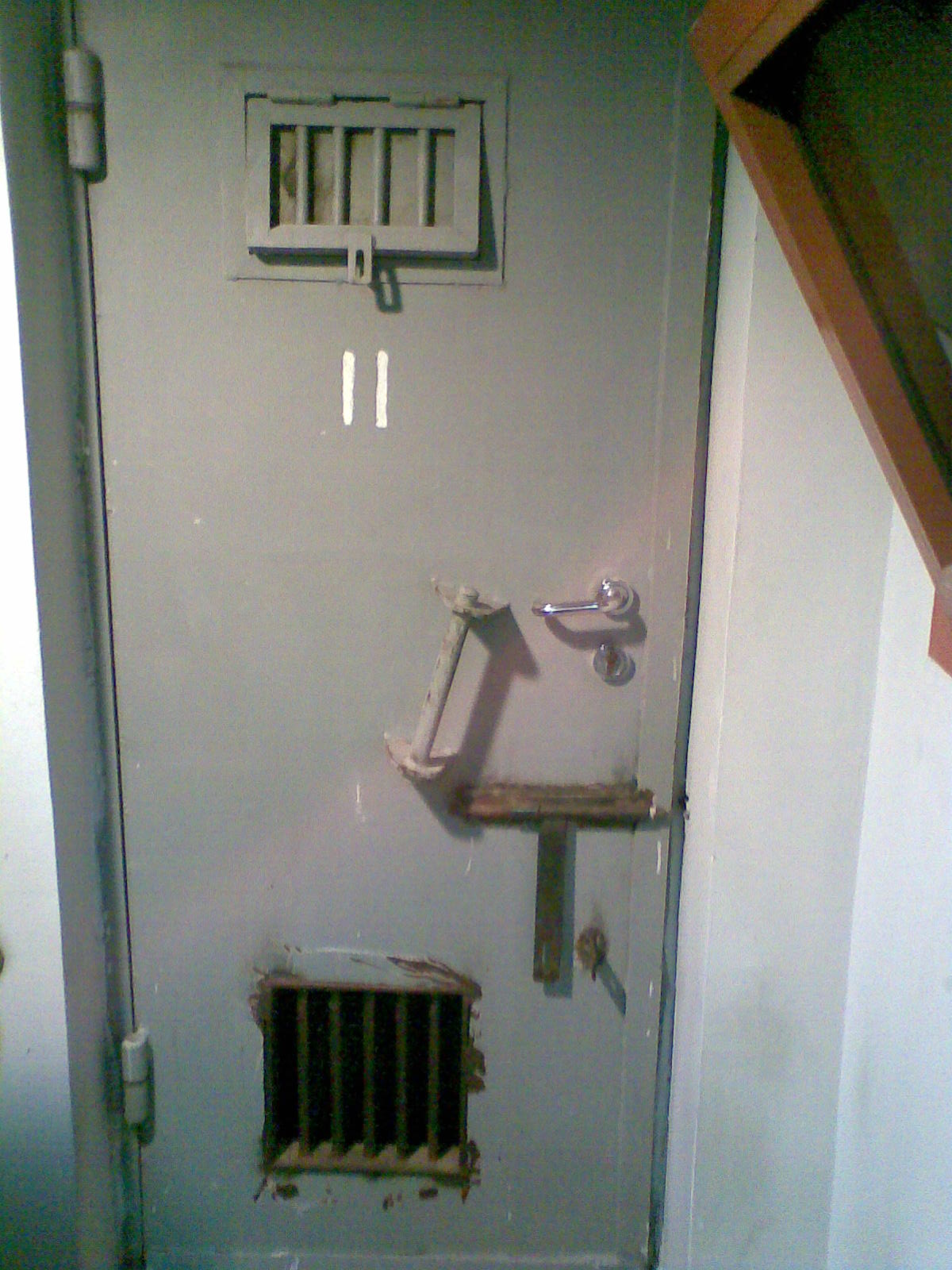
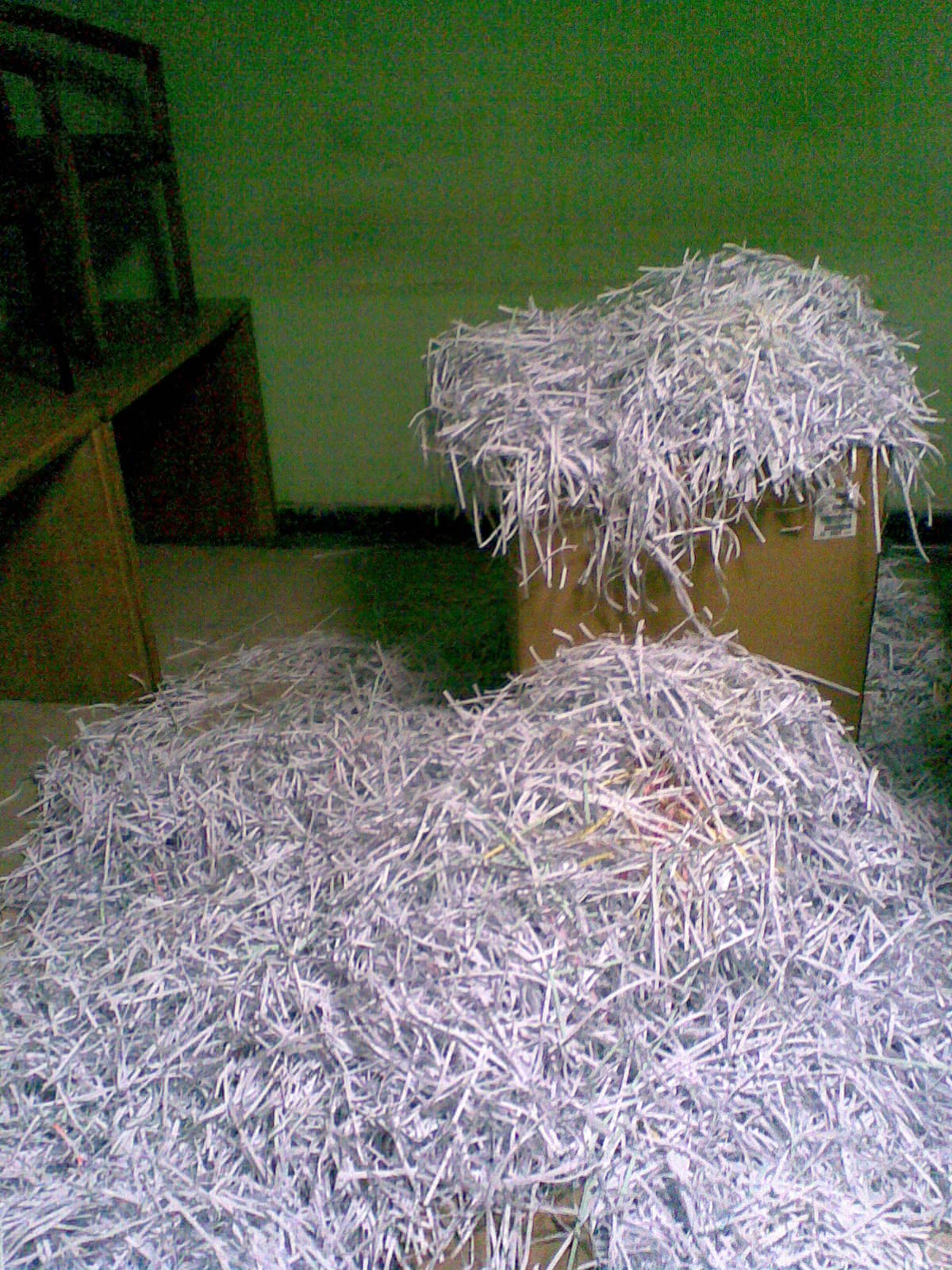
Left: An underground cell in State Security Investigations Service. Right: Shredded documents found inside State Security Investigations Service.

Before any large protests against him were planned, Ahmed Shafik stepped down as Prime Minister and was replaced by Essam Sharaf. Sharaf returned to Tahrir Square, which he had also visited during the revolution, to address the Friday mass rally.

The foreign, justice, interior, and oil ministers resigned and three new ministers were named: General and former governor of Minya, Mansour El Essawi, became interior minister; Mohamed Abdel Aziz Al-Guindy became justice minister; and former judge Nabil Elaraby was appointed foreign minister. Secretary General of the New Wafd Party, Monir Fakhri Abdel Nour, remained tourism minister. State television aired footage of the ceremony showing the prime minister and his Cabinet taking the oath before Field Marshal Mohammed Hussein Tantawi, who heads the ruling military council.

On 5 March, three weeks after Hosni Mubarak was ousted as President, Egyptians turned their anger toward his internal security apparatus by storming the agency's main headquarters and other offices in order to seize documents that would provide evidence of human rights abuses as well as preventing said documents from being destroyed. Following rumors that officials were destroying evidence, 200 protesters stormed the secret police headquarters in Cairo. The closing of the agency has been a key demand of the protesters but one which had not been heeded. Human rights abuses, including torture, were alleged to have been carried out inside it. The protesters stated that they stormed the building to secure evidence as they feared that it might be destroyed. The SSIS was announced dissolved on 15 March 2011, with a new National Security Force replacing it.

A group of youths who participated in the protests announced the formation of the Party of Youths for Change on 6 March 2011.

Mohamed ElBaradei stated on 9 March 2011 that he would run in the presidential elections.

On 19 March, the constitutional referendum was held, with millions of Egyptians turning up to vote on nine proposed amendments to the constitution. Eager for their first free vote, Egyptians formed long lines outside polling centers to cast their ballots on constitutional amendments that were sponsored by the ruling military. In the lead up to the referendum, there was still dispute amongst the political movements and parties in Egypt about whether they should approve or reject the proposed constitutional amendments. 16 of those political parties and movements, including The Alliance of Women's Organizations, announced that they would reject the proposed amendments and call for the creation of a new constitution. The movements also renewed their calls for protests against the amendments to be held. Supporters of the amendments include the Muslim Brotherhood, the Wasat Party, and the Labor Party. The proposed amendments were limited to nine articles, which some deemed to be insufficient as they failed to limit the power of the president, whilst others argued that the amendments were only a temporary measure and as such did not need to include all the changes that were requested, as the Constitution was to be completely redrafted after the parliamentary and presidential elections. This point has proven to be the most contentious with those who oppose the amendments. They claim that a redrafted Constitution will not be representative with the Egyptian presidential candidate Mohamed ElBaradei calling on all Egyptians to reject the proposed constitutional amendments, saying that a "Yes" vote will "provide a parliament not representative of the people, composed mainly of members of the National Democratic Party and benefiting businessmen, the opportunity to uphold a Constitution which is also not representative of the people, and this will take us backwards to a great extent." ElBaradei was assaulted when he showed up at a school in Moqattam to vote.

The final results of the referendum were announced the next day: 77.2% of Egyptians voted "YES" to constitutional amendments, while 22.8% voted "NO". In total, 18,537,954 Egyptians voted out of around 45 million eligible voters, making the turnout 41%.

=== April ===
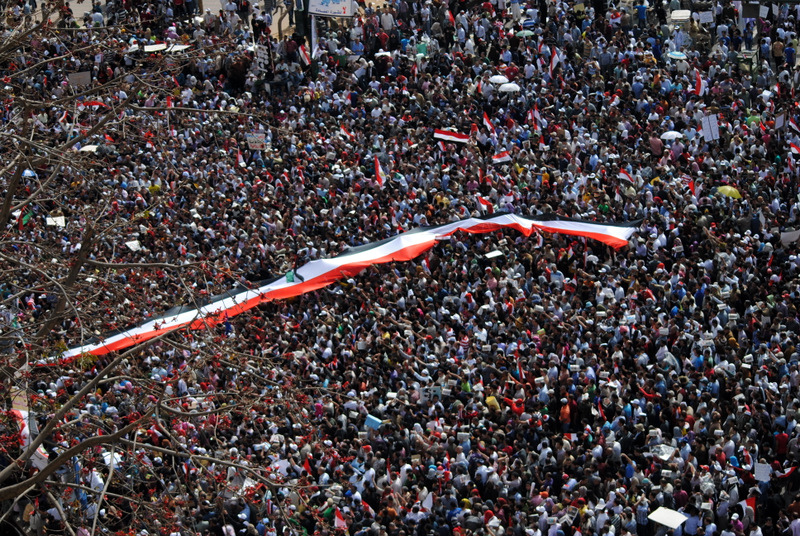
Hundreds of thousands of people protesting in Tahrir Square on 1 April 2011

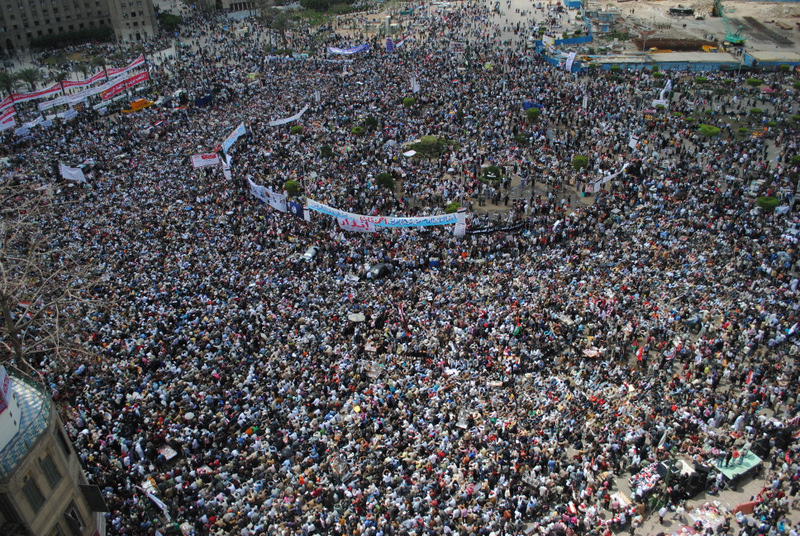
Hundreds of thousands of people protesting in Tahrir Square on 8 April 2011

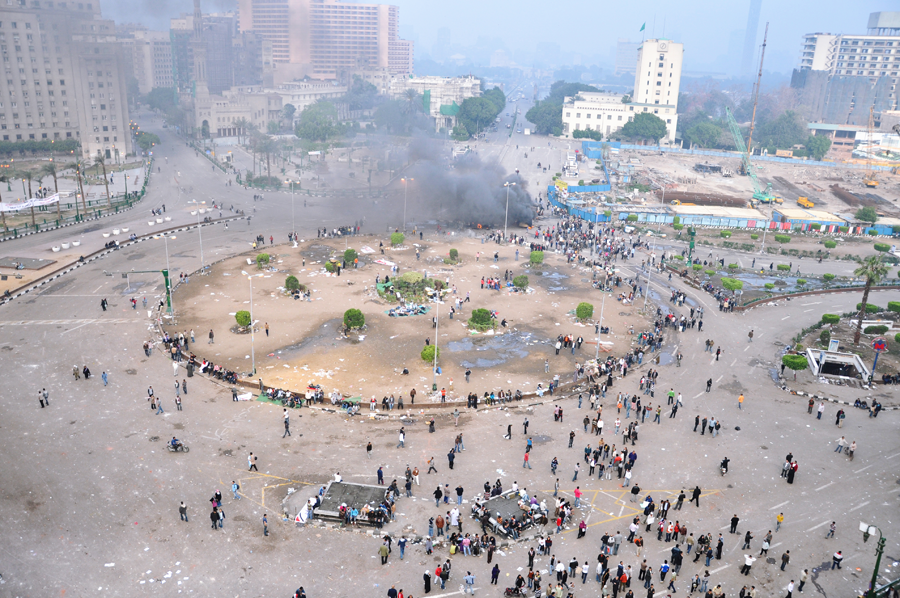
Two army vehicles burning in Tahrir Square after the army attack that happened on 9 April 2011 in the Square from 3:00 to 5:30 am; at least two protesters were killed and dozens were wounded.

On 1 April, protesters called for a "Save the Revolution" day in which thousands of demonstrators filled Tahrir Square after Friday prayers demanded that the ruling military council move faster to dismantle lingering aspects of the old regime; it was the largest protest since Mubarak's resignation.

On 3 April, the Muslim Brotherhood called on its members to participate in the demonstrations in Tahrir Square on 8 April. Having withheld support for demonstrations held on 1 April because they coincided with Orphans' Day, the Brotherhood called for a large turnout to pressure the government to pursue cases against members of the old regime who remained in positions of influence after the revolution. The Brotherhood also suggested the name "Friday of Purging" for the event. The next day, employees of the Ministry of Agriculture and the Amonsito Textile Company demonstrated outside cabinet offices.

On 5 April, Egyptian authorities arrested Omneya Soliman, the former housing minister.

On 7 April, the National Association for Change seemed to accept the Brotherhood's proposal, calling for the "Friday of Prosecution and Purging", a million-man march on Tahrir Square, on 8 April. The NAC also proposed holding a mock "people's trial" of the regime figures for whom they demand the prosecution and/or removal of. While Friday protests in Tahrir Square had been a weekly event, million-man protests had not been seen for some time. The following day, protesters called for a "Friday of Cleansing" in which hundreds of thousands of demonstrators filled Tahrir Square again. They criticised the ruling SCAF for not following through on the protesters' previous demands. They called for the resignation of the remaining Mybarak-era figures and the removal of Egypt's public prosecutor due to the slow pace of investigations of corrupt former officials.

On 9 April, the military used force to break up a camp that protesters had set up in Tahrir Square, as tensions also continued to build between the protesters and the military leadership that were running the country in the interim.

On 12 April, Hosni Mubarak was questioned in hospital by prosecutors. The following day the country's Prosecutor General ordered the detention of Mubarak and his two children, Alaa Mubarak and Gamal Mubarak, for 15 days. A statement from the Attorney General Egyptian published on its Facebook page said that the arrest warrant was issued after the prosecution presented the charges against them and in accordance with the development of the criminal investigations around the rioting that led to the fall of the regime.

On 15 April, thousands of protesters again marched from Shoubra to Tahrir in support of minority rights for Coptic christians.

On 16 April, the National Democratic Party was dissolved and its assets transferred to the state. Mubarak's name was also removed from all public places on 21 April 2011.

On 23 April, Egypt ordered the former energy minister to stand trial for the natural gas deal with Israel. Three days later, the pipeline to Israel and Jordan was again attacked.

On 18 April, Iran appointed its first ambassador to Egypt since the Islamic Revolution.

On 29 April, demonstrators in Tahrir Square expressed solidarity with other Arab uprisings.

=== May ===
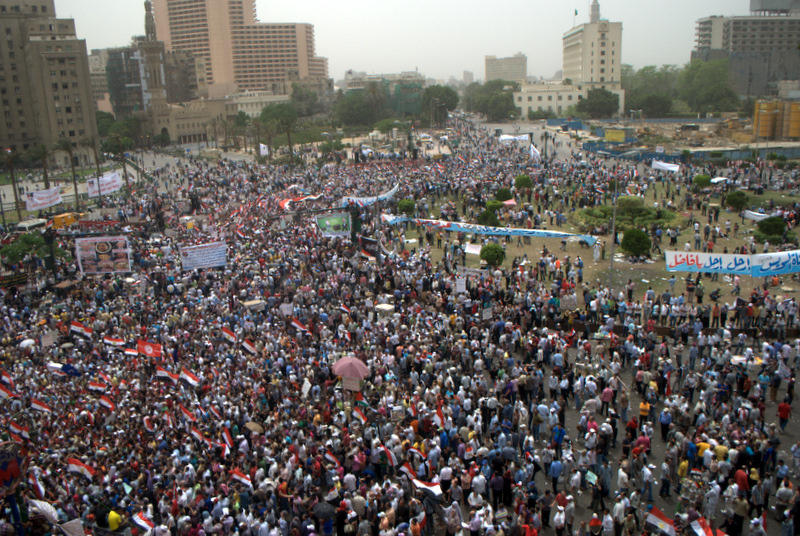
Hundreds of thousands of people protesting in Tahrir Square on 27 May 2011

On 24 May, it was announced that Mubarak and his two sons, Gamal and Alaa, would be tried over the deaths of anti-government protesters. On 28 May, Mubarak was fined $34m (£20m stg) for cutting off communications services during the uprising.

Egypt also eased the blockade at the Rafah border crossing with Gaza. Women, children, and men over 40 were allowed to pass freely while men aged between 18 and 40 would still require a permit. Though trade across the border remained prohibited, the crossing was opened between 9:00 – 21:00 every day except on Fridays and public holidays. The move was strongly opposed by Israel.

=== June ===
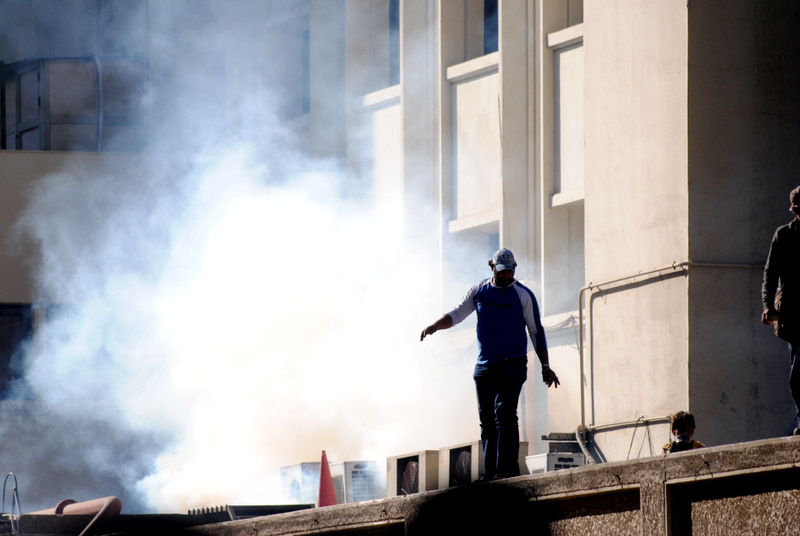
A protester braving tear gas near the AUC during 28 June.

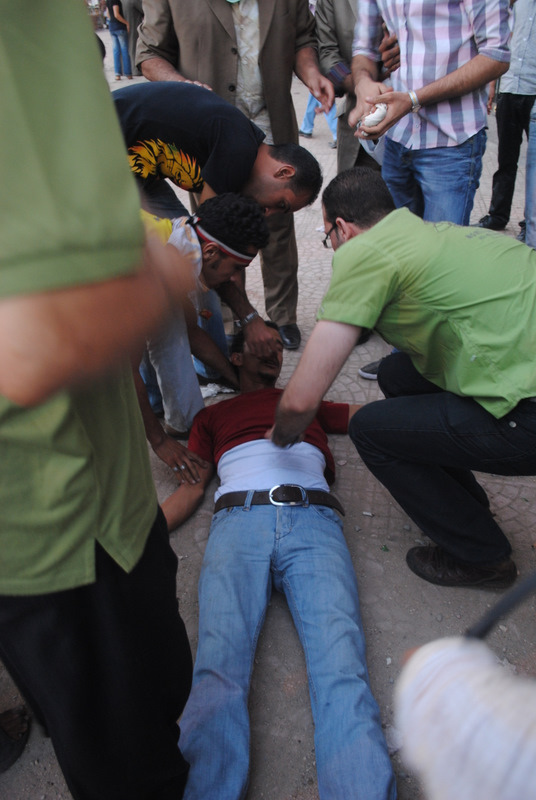
Treating an injured man in Tahrir due to inhalation of CS gas during 28 June.

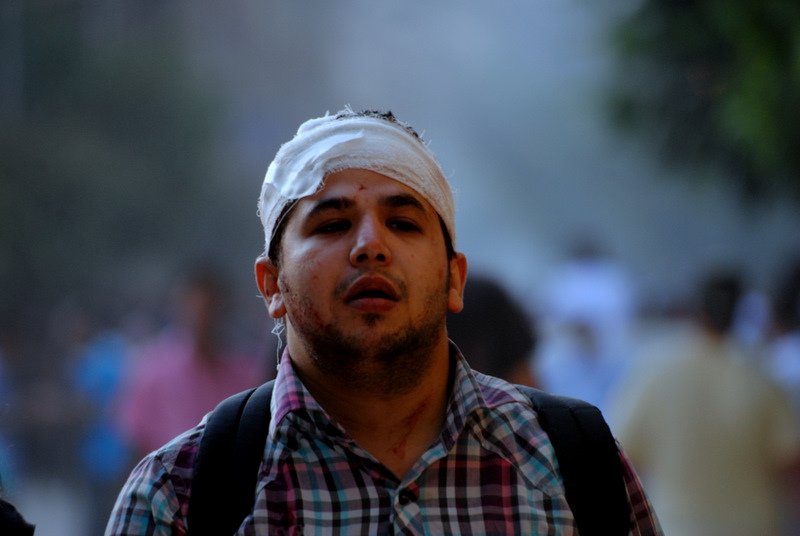
Injured protester near Tahrir Square during 28 June.

On 6 June, crowds of Egyptians dressed in black held demonstrations to honour Khaled Said, a young man from Alexandria who was beaten to death in 2010 in a savage attack which was blamed on police. This attack helped inspire the uprising that brought down Egypt's president. Pictures of his body, taken by his family in a morgue, caused public outrage that caused the January 2011 uprising. Hundreds of protesters stood side by side on Stanley Bridge in Alexandria in a silent protest commemorating the death of Said. The protesters neither held pictures or banners of Said; they only carried the Egyptian flag. They then marched to Said's family's home in Cleopatra. By the time they arrived there, more people joined, and the number of protesters reached about 1,500. They set a big monitor on the street screening a documentary on Said's case and its development.

On 12 June, Ilan Grapel, accused for being an Israeli spy, was arrested by Egyptian authorities, who claimed that Grapel was sent to Egypt to build a team that had been "trying to gather information and data and to monitor the events of 25 January revolution." The authorities also claimed that Grapel tried to incite violence amongst Egyptian protestors, hoping to spark a face-off with the military "and spread chaos in the Egyptian public and harm the state's political, economic, and social interests." Grapel appears to be the same man who told Haaretz that he moved to Israel three years before its 2006 war with Lebanon and ended up enlisting in the Israeli Defense Force. Israel, however, has denied the reports, stating that "There is no such thing, no Israeli agent has been arrested in Egypt. These reports are false." Friends and relatives of Grapel said that he is a law student in Atlanta with an avid interest in the Middle East, and not a Mossad agent out to sabotage Egypt's revolution, as Egyptian authorities have charged. His mother said he arrived in Cairo in May, countering implications that he was involved in protests as early as February. The arrest of 27-year-old Ilan Grapel has sparked fears in Israel that relations with Egypt will sour now that Hosni Mubarak has been deposed. Later that year, Egyptian officials admitted Ilan Grapel was not a spy, and he was scheduled for release in exchange for 25 Egyptian prisoners held in Israel.

On 19 June, the military prosecution released the editor-in-chief of Al-Fagr, Adel Hammouda, and journalist Rasha Azab without bail pending further investigation. They were both interrogated on charges of publishing false news that disturbed the peace and negligence in the editorial process. Hammouda was released at around 13 pm, while Azab was released at around 16:30 pm after which she immediately led chants of "down with military rule." Azab had written an article about a meeting between SCAF and prominent members of an advocacy group against military trials for civilians called "No to Military Trials" in which group members provided SCAF with proof and evidence of military violations against civilians. Azab said that Major General Hassan El-Roweiny was astonished when he saw the pictures and testimonies. She added that El-Roweiny apologized to one of the female witnesses for being violated in military prison, adding that individual actions don't represent the morals or principles of the army.

On 20 June, Mubarak's lawyer, Farid el-Deeb, said that in 2010 the former president underwent "critical surgery" in Heidelberg, Germany to remove his gallbladder and part of his pancreas which were cancerous. el-Deeb told The Associated Press that "there is evidence suggesting that there is a recurrence of cancer and that it has reached the stomach,". He called Mubarak's condition "horrible" and said the former leader "doesn't eat and he loses consciousness quite often." Mubarak is hospitalized in Sharm el-Sheikh, the Red Sea resort where he has been living since he was removed from power.

On 21 June, Egypt's military rulers launched an online poll to test the popularity of potential presidential candidates, a move that could be aimed at judging public opinion for former officials who were trying to run for positions of parliament again. The list includes at least four ex-military officers as well as Islamists, judges, diplomats and others. Most have declared that they will run, including two former officers.

On 22 June, Egypt's cabinet approved a budget for the 2011–2012 fiscal year, boosting spending in social programs to meet the growing demands from the people after the uprising. The budget totals E£490.6 billion ($83 billion), reflecting a spending increase of 14.7% over the current fiscal year, while revenues are forecast at $59 billion. On the same day, leaders of the youth wing of the Muslim Brotherhood have split with their elders to form an independent political party. This has deepened the fractures within the group as some of its prominent members have moved towards a more centrist and liberal version of Islamist politics. The new group, the Egyptian Current Party, is expected to advocate the separation of religion from politics, the protection of individual freedoms and the embrace of Islamic morals and culture without the enforcement of Islamic religious law. Its founders, including Islam Lotfy, Mohamed el-Kasaas and Mohamed Abbas, were amongst the young leaders of the Egyptian revolution and broke with the Brotherhood to help lead the first day of protests that brought down Hosni Mubarak.

On 26 June, John McCain and John Kerry visited Egypt at the head of a U.S. business delegation. Both politicians said that it was in America's national security interests to see that the uprising succeeded. They said that Washington was not interested in dictating policy to Egypt. Instead, the focus was on finding ways to help the Arab world's most populous nation boost its economy and address the needs of its people.

On 28 June, Egyptian security forces clashed with around 5,000 protesters in central Cairo. According to witnesses and medical officials, dozens of demonstrators were injured. Clouds of tear gas engulfed Tahrir Square as the security forces battled to regain control of the central plaza from the demonstrators, a number of whom had family members who were killed during the revolution. The families were frustrated with what they perceived to be the slow prosecution of security officers who were believed to be responsible for the deaths of some 850 protesters during the 18-day uprising in February. As Tuesday's clashes moved into early Wednesday morning, rocks and shattered glass littered the streets around Tahrir, as protesters chanted "Down with the military junta". The demonstrators used motorcycles to ferry the injured to safety. According to the Health Ministry some 1,036 people were injured, among them at least 40 policemen. Early the next day there were still some demonstrators who were hurling stones at police near the ministry as commuters went to work.

=== July ===
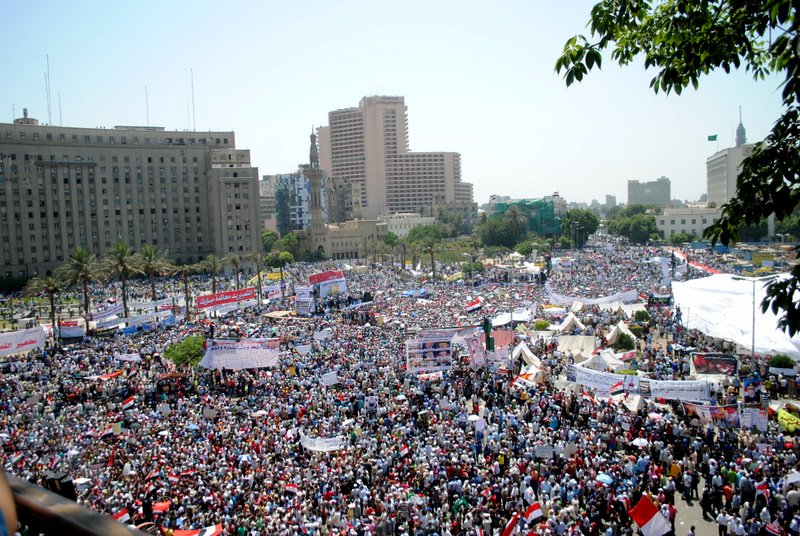
Hundreds of thousands of people protesting in Tahrir Square on 8 July 2011

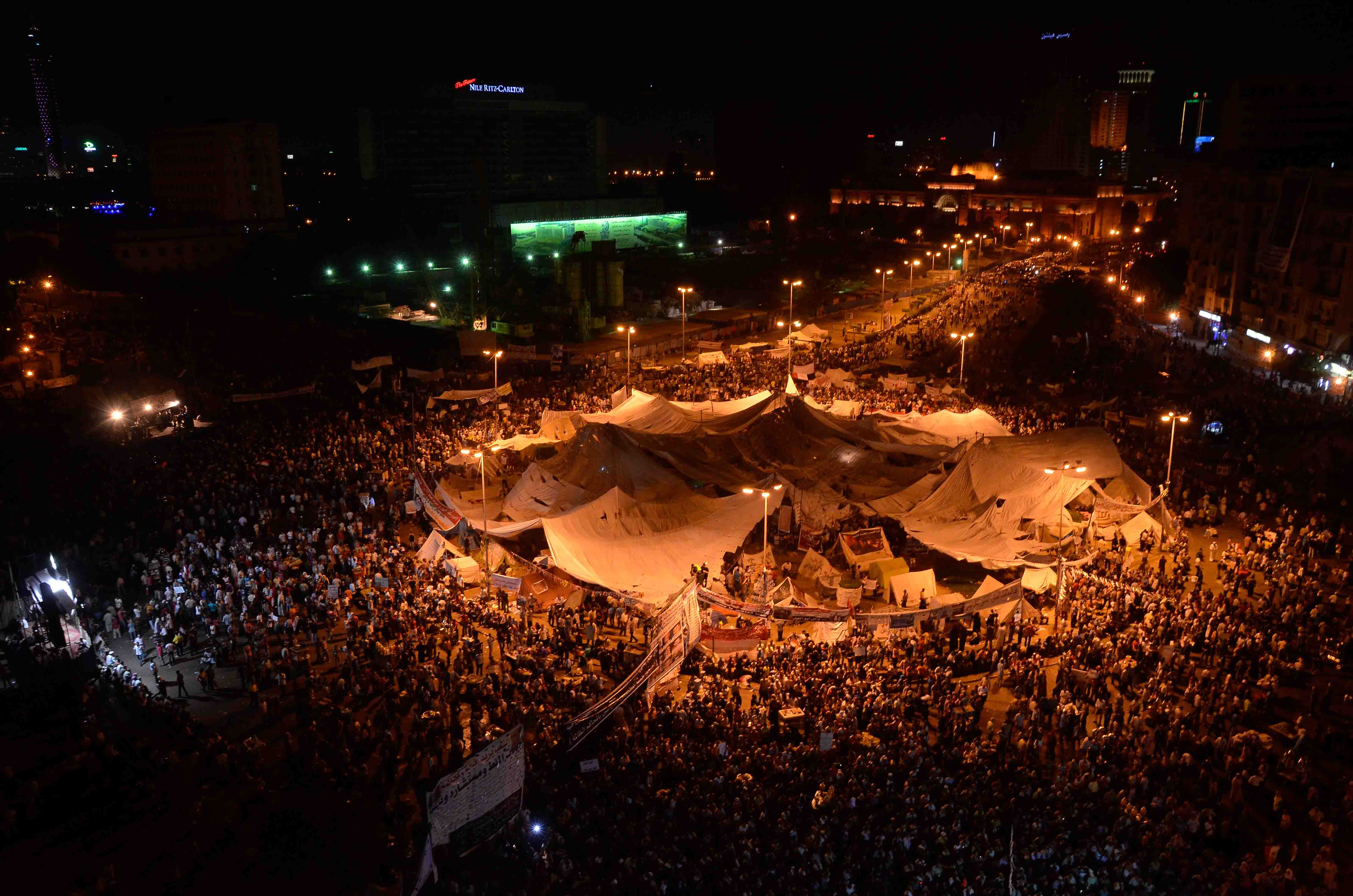
Hundreds of thousands of people protesting in Tahrir Square on 15 July 2011

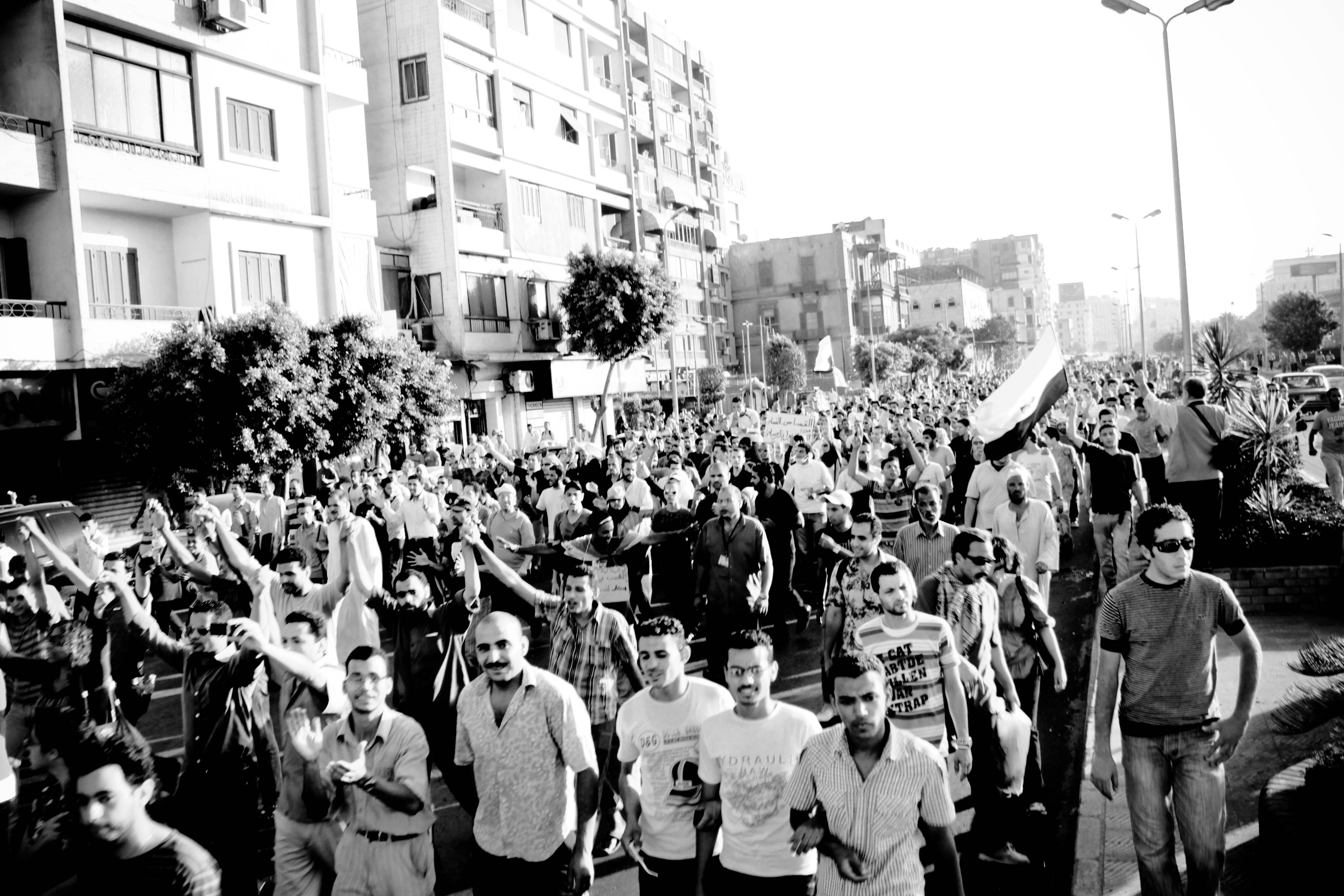
Thousands of people protesting on 23 July 2011

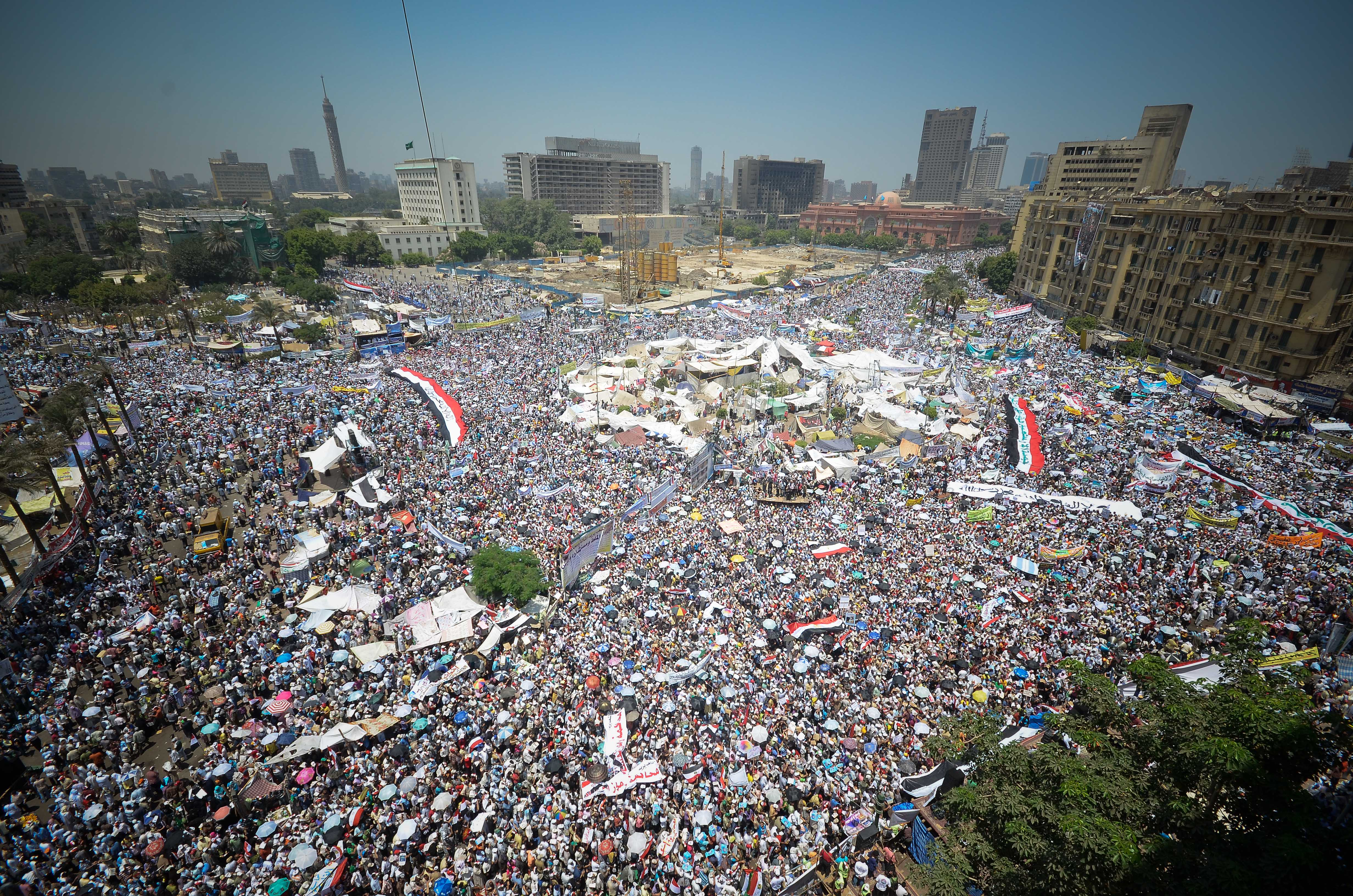
Hundreds of thousands of people protesting in Tahrir Square on 29 July 2011

A Facebook page entitled "The Second Egyptian Revolution of Rage" read: "Seeing that the situation, under the leadership of the Supreme Council of the Armed Forces, is only going from bad to worse, and since the council has proven from day one that public pressure is the most effective policy for achieving the demands of the legitimate revolution, we have decided to take to the streets and squares [once again] and demonstrate throughout Egypt until our demands are met ..." On 1 July, tens of thousands of protesters gathered for what they termed the "Friday of Retribution" in Suez, Alexandria and Tahrir Square in Cairo to voice frustrations with the ruling Supreme Council of the Armed Forces for what they perceived to be the slow pace of change five months after Mubarak's ousting.

On 4 July, an explosion at the pipeline near Nagah in the Sinai Peninsula halted natural gas supplies to Israel and Jordan. This was the third attack on Egyptian gas pipelines since Mubarak was removed from power. There was also a failed attempt to attack the pipeline in March.

On 8 July, hundreds of thousands of protesters gathered for what they called the "Friday of Determination" or the "March of the Million" in Suez, Alexandria, Cairo and other cities. They demanded immediate reforms and swifter prosecution of former officials from the ousted government. Revolutionaries in Tahrir square also began another sit-in which is still ongoing.

Most of Egypt's political parties and coalitions supported widespread calls for the protest to be staged across Egypt. The protesters hoped to start a "second revolution". The main demand of these groups is to combine efforts toward achieving the goals of the revolution, including: banning the trial of civilians by military courts; setting a minimum wage; bringing Mubarak, his sons and the senior officials to justice quickly; banning former National Democratic Party (NDP) members from political activity for five years; releasing all political prisoners; purging the police, the legal system, the media, the universities and the banks of members of the former regime; electing new municipal councils; stopping the export of natural gas to Israel; the arrest and trial of those responsible for killing protesters; and restructuring the ministry of interior. An employee of the Suez Canal University said that in Ismailiya, there were also protests for higher wages and stable employment contracts. Protesters also called for the removal of Mohamed Hussein Tantawi, who was said to be emblematic of the old regime.

Several stages have been set up by the Revolution Youth Coalition (a coalition of liberal parties and movements), the Muslim Brotherhood, the Wafd party and leftist parties in order to organise the protests. As the Muslim Brotherhood's stage was the highest and largest, a number of protesters complained that they were attempting to gain an unfair advantage over the other political parties. These accusations were also compounded by the Muslim Brotherhood's opposition to a sit-in called by other political groups to pressure the Supreme Council of Armed Forces (SCAF) into meeting their demands. Though the Muslim Brotherhood decided to join the protests only two days before the event, it said that it would avoid the sit-in and leave by 17:00. The event was used to rally support for the various groups by organizing their own tents and passing out paraphernalia.

On 9 July, Minister of Interior Mansour Essawy sacked the head of the Suez Security Police Osama El-Taweel and appointed Adel Abd El-Hamid as his replacement following clashes between families of those killed during the revolution and the Suez police. The clashes, in turn, followed accusations that the head of the Suez police had helped the police officers accused of killing protesters to escape trial after a court ruling released the officers on bail. Prime Minister Essam Sharaf also responded to the protests, saying that any member of the security forces who was accused of killing protesters would be sacked: "I have issued new instructions as a matter of urgency for the minister of interior to suspend any officers implicated in the killing of protesters. I have also demanded a swift return to the highest levels of security on the streets of Egypt to make them safe again and give our citizens the dignity they deserve." On the night of 10 July, gunmen blew up an Egyptian natural gas pipeline to Israel and Jordan in the town of El-Arish in the Sinai Peninsula. This is the fourth time this has occurred this year and the second time in less than a week

On 11 July, Prime Minister Essam Sharaf made a televised statement reassuring protesters that the government would respond to public demands and also included a timeline in which these demands would be met. The changes included a new cabinet to be formed within one week and a change in provincial governors before the end of the month. The protesters responded with calls for a million-man march the following day and continuation of their sit-in in Tahrir Square. The Muslim Brotherhood responded that they will not participate in the sit-in. The next morning the SCAF issued a statement, which was perceived as aggressive.

On 13 July, state television reported that Egypt's government had met a key demand of protesters by firing nearly 700 top police officers in order to cleanse the discredited and widely unpopular force. It was also reported that 37 of the dismissed officers face charges of killing protesters. Among those dismissed were 505 major-generals, including 10 of the interior minister's top assistants, 82 colonels and 82 brigadiers.

On 14 July, Mubarak told prosecutors that he did not order security forces to open fire on protesters during the initial uprising in February. Transcripts of prosecutors questioning Mubarak were published in two Egyptian newspapers, and judicial officials confirmed the authenticity of the documents. Mubarak said he issued clear instructions for police not to use force against the protesters. He also denied charges that he ordered or had knowledge of security forces firing on the demonstrators.

On 16 July, Maj. Gen. Tarek el-Mahdi briefly visited a protest camp in Tahrir Square but left after protesters, some holding shoes in anger, booed him off a stage. He had come to persuade a dozen demonstrators to end a hunger strike which had begun several days ago. El-Mahdi later told state television that he was disappointed that a small crowd of protesters managed to drive him out of the square before he could reach the tent housing the hunger strikers. Prime Minister Essam Sharaf also accepted the resignation of Foreign Minister Mohammed el-Orabi. He then appointed two new deputies, one of which was prominent economist and former head of the U.N. Economic and Social Commission for Western Asia, Hazem el-Biblawi.

On 17 July, Sharaf named 12 new Cabinet members. State television dubbed the new government lineup the "Revolution Cabinet". Most of the ministers were newcomers as the government sought to placate further criticism by the protesters. Despite the cabinet reshuffle, a number of the protesters said that they had no intention of calling off their week-old sit-in. One of the members of the "Revolution Cabinet" was the Chief of Antiquities Zahi Hawass. Hawass is a prominent member of Egypt's archaeological community but has been the target of protests himself. These protests were begun by archaeology students who accused him of falsely claiming publicity for himself and corruption. Sharaf also accepted the resignation of Finance Minister Samir Radwan (the reason for his resignation was because his new budget was deemed by multiple protesters to be too conservative in dealing with the poverty which had been one of the main catalysts of the uprising) and the foreign minister, who was replaced by the former ambassador to Saudi Arabia, Mohammed Kamel Omar. Radwan's position was taken by economist Hazem el-Biblawi, who had also been appointed deputy prime minister. There were also changes in the ministries of transport, military production, higher education, communication, agriculture, health, religious endowments, local development, trade and industry and civil aviation, with ministers being replaced.

On 21 July, the SCAF announced that it would bar foreign monitors in the upcoming parliamentary election because of what it claimed was the preservation of Egyptian sovereignty.

On 23 July, thousands of protesters tried to march to the Defense Ministry of Egypt in Cairo when they were attacked by groups of men wielding knives, sticks, stones and Molotov cocktails. It was the second time in two days that crowds had tried to march to the headquarters located in Heliopolis. The march started moving from Tahrir Square at 4:00 pm, picking up more and more protesters as the march went on to Ramsis and then to the eastern Abbasiya neighbourhood, where it was stopped by army barricades. The march was a reaction to the SCAF accused 6 April Youth Movement and Kefaya of treason and that their movements are harming "national interests" a day earlier. The violence broke out following a televised speech commemorating the 1952 coup by Field Marshal Mohammed Hussein Tantawi, head of the ruling military council, who attempted to defuse tensions by praising young people who led the uprising that toppled Mubarak. The clashes broke out after civilians threw rocks from rooftops in adjacent buildings. Some in the crowd were thought by protesters to be thugs but some residents of the Abbassiya district were fearful protests in their neighborhood were obstructing business and normalcy. State media said the civilians fighting with the demonstrators were from "people's committees" protecting the neighborhood and the army had maintained all self-restraint, blaming the violence on protesters. Some Abbasiya residents appeared to believe protesters were seeking to create rifts between the army and the people. Military police, armed with Tasers and batons, fired in the air to stop the demonstrators from approaching the Defense Ministry. A Reuters witness said tear gas fumes were wafting outside the area as military helicopters circled overhead. The Health Ministry stated a total of 231 people were wounded in the violence.

=== August ===
External videos
- Salma el Daly's testimony about the Ramadan Iftar on YouTube
- Salma Said's testimony about the Ramadan Iftar on YouTube

On 1 August, the first day of Ramadan, Egyptian soldiers clashed with protesters in Tahrir Square, tearing down tents the activists had used for the sit-in and where hundreds of protesters had been sleeping in the square since 8 July. Egyptian forces swinging electrified batons and shouting the battle cry "God is great" swiftly chased off dozens of activists who had refused to end four weeks of renewed protests at Tahrir Square to pressure the country's transitional military rulers. Hundreds of riot police backed by armored vehicles and soldiers moved in to tear down the camp of dozens of tents after a group of holdout activists — some of them relatives of people killed in the uprising that toppled Hosni Mubarak in February — refused pleas over loudspeakers to go home. Some in the crowd hurled stones at the police. Protesters' rights groups said that the military police detained 66 people in the process. The removal of the Tahrir sit-in was a calculated political move. Average citizens had been growing weary of the lack of mobility in the central square, so when the military showed up on early Monday afternoon they were met with cheers. Most Egyptians supported the military's actions.

The trial of Hosni Mubarak and his two sons Ala'a and Gamal, along with former interior minister Habib el-Adly and six former top police officials began on 3 August 2011 at a temporary criminal court at the Police Academy in north Cairo. The charges were corruption and the premediated killing of peaceful protestors during the mass movement to oust him, the latter of which carries the death penalty. The trial was broadcast on Egyptian television, with Mubarak making a surprise first appearance since his resignation, brought in on a hospital bed and held in a cage for the session. Upon reading out the charges to him, Mubarak pleaded not guilty, denying responsibility for the charges against him. Judge Ahmed Refaat adjourned the court, ruling that Mubarak be transferred under continued arrest to the military hospital on the outskirts of Cairo, with the second session scheduled for 15 August.

The trials of Mubarak and el-Adly were separated after the first session, and a second hearing was held for el-Adly's case on 4 August to release evidence regarding the killings of protesters. After hearing the complaints and requests of the defense lawyers, Judge Refaat proceeded to open multiple boxes of evidence for screening before the lawyers and audience. The evidence included documents of the Central Security Forces, their unit formations and organization, operational police logs and details of orders received and carried out during the protests, a jacket and pants of one of the victims of the protests riddled with bullet holes, guns, spent ammunition casings and grenades used during the protests. At the end of the hearing, Judge Refaat adjourned the trial to 14 August.

The conduct of individual defense lawyers in both sessions was widely criticized, being somewhat unruly and disorderly, and Judge Refaat demanded at least once during the second hearing that they assume order. That day, Interior Minister Mansour el-Esawy issued several warnings for police officers not to salute or greet el-Adly and the other accused men, and threatened that he would place the officers under investigation if they did so again.

On Friday, 6 August, protesters reassembled in Tahrir, this time to hold a funeral prayer for one who died during the Abasseya clashes. Around 200 attended, and were prevented from moving to Tahrir Square. Later during the day, a festive iftar was held in the square by protesters. After finishing, they were attacked by military police and central security forces, who dispersed them using force.

On 14 August, Asmaa Mahfouz was arrested on charges of defaming the Egyptian military junta for calling them a "council of dogs". She was referred to a military court, prompting activists, as well as presidential hopefuls such as Mohamed ElBaradei and Ayman Nour, to protest her being charged in a military court. Mahfouz was released on bail in the amount of E£20,000, equivalent to approximately US$3,350.

=== September ===
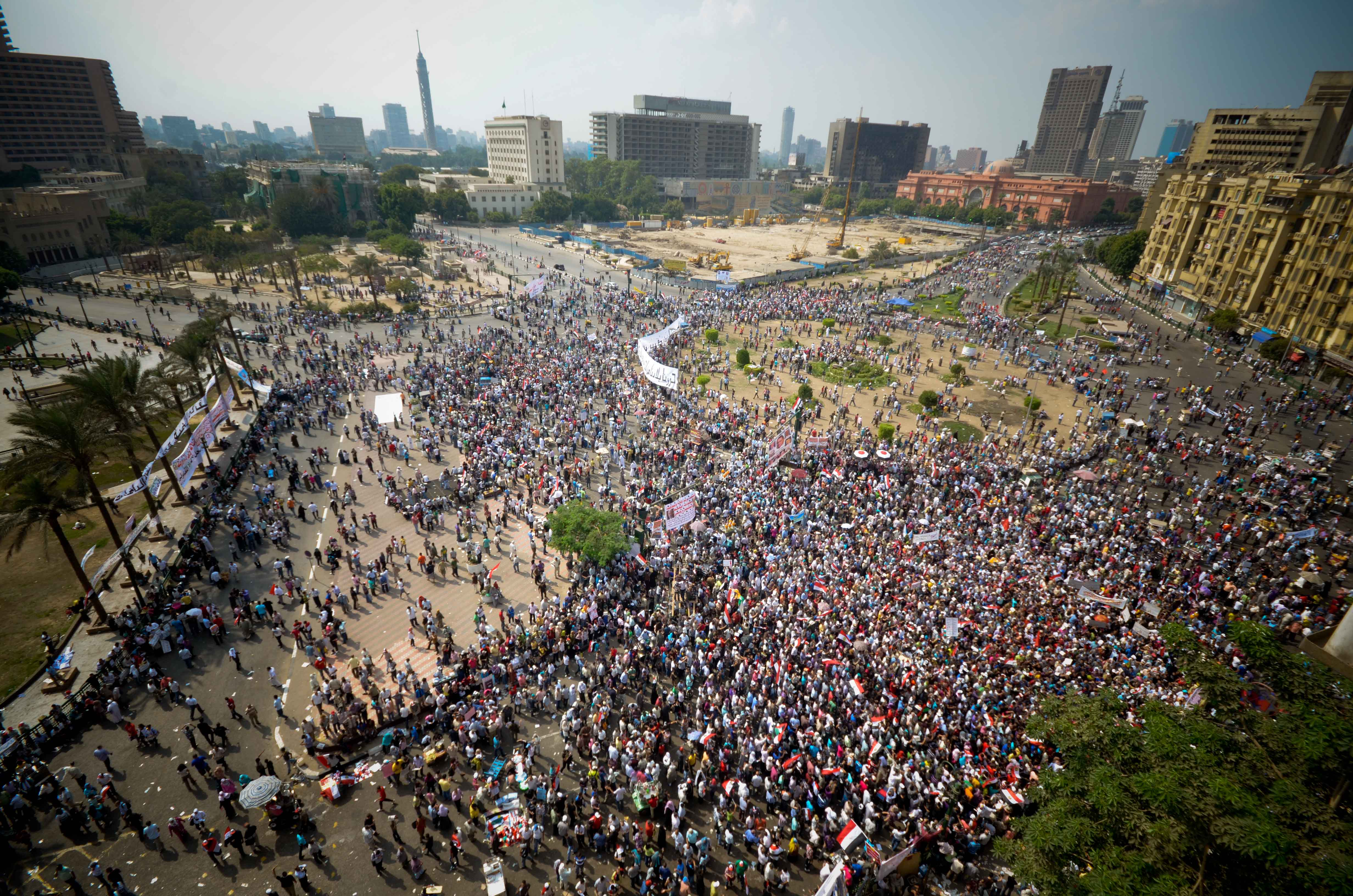
Tens of thousands of people protesting on 9 September 2011

On 9 September, tens of thousands of protesters gathered for what they called the "Friday of Correcting the Path" (or the "Correct the Path") in Suez, Alexandria, Cairo, and other cities, in the absence of supporters of Islamic political movements.

The major demands of the Friday were relieving the Mansour el-Essawy (The current Minister of the Interior), maintaining independence of the judiciary, closing the Israeli embassy in Cairo, amending the laws of the People's Assembly and Shura Council, and stopping military trials for civilians that began under the SCAF.

After gathering in Tahrir Square, the protest moved to the MOI, then to the Supreme Constitutional Court of Egypt, and finally towards the Israeli embassy. The 2011 Israeli embassy attack occurred later in Cairo, when Egyptian protesters entered the Israeli embassy after tearing down the wall surrounding the building that housed it. Police fired tear gas into the crowds. Israeli Foreign Ministry spokesman Yigal Palmor said that about 3,000 protesters had torn apart the wall, forcing the Israeli ambassador to Egypt to flee. The military restored a state of emergency; Egyptian activists denounced the political manipulation of doing so.

=== October ===
External videos
- The storming of 25 January TV station on YouTube
- Clashes between the army and demonstrators in front of Maspero on YouTube
- RAW: Egypt Copts in Deadly Clashes with Army on YouTube

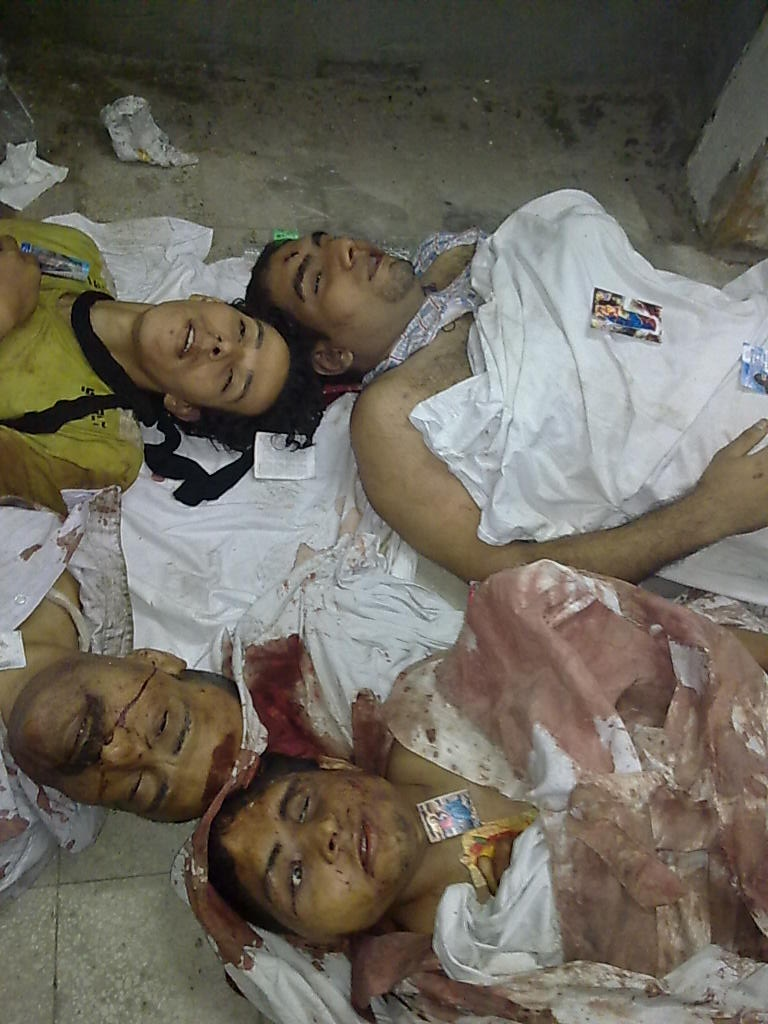
Victims of the 9 October riots.

Late into the evening of 9 October, during a protest that was held in Maspiro, peaceful Egyptian protesters, calling for the dissolution the Supreme Council of the Armed Forces, the resignation of its chairman, Field Marshal Mohamed Tantawi, and the dismissal of the governor of Aswan province, were attacked by military police. At least 25 people were killed and more than 200 wounded. The protest began due to an attack on a Coptic Christian church in Merinab village in Aswan on 30 September. Aswan governor Mustafa al-Seyyed said that Copts had built the church without having the proper permits. The 9 October attack was committed by both the Egyptian police force and military police using live ammunition, vehicles to run over protesters and extensive rounds of tear gas were fired.

The Army also stormed Al-Hurra TV station and 25 January TV stations, and took them off air. The State Media, which has become biased to military junta, asked on "honorable" Egyptians to protect the army against attacks by "Coptic protesters" even though the protesters were not only Copts.

=== November ===
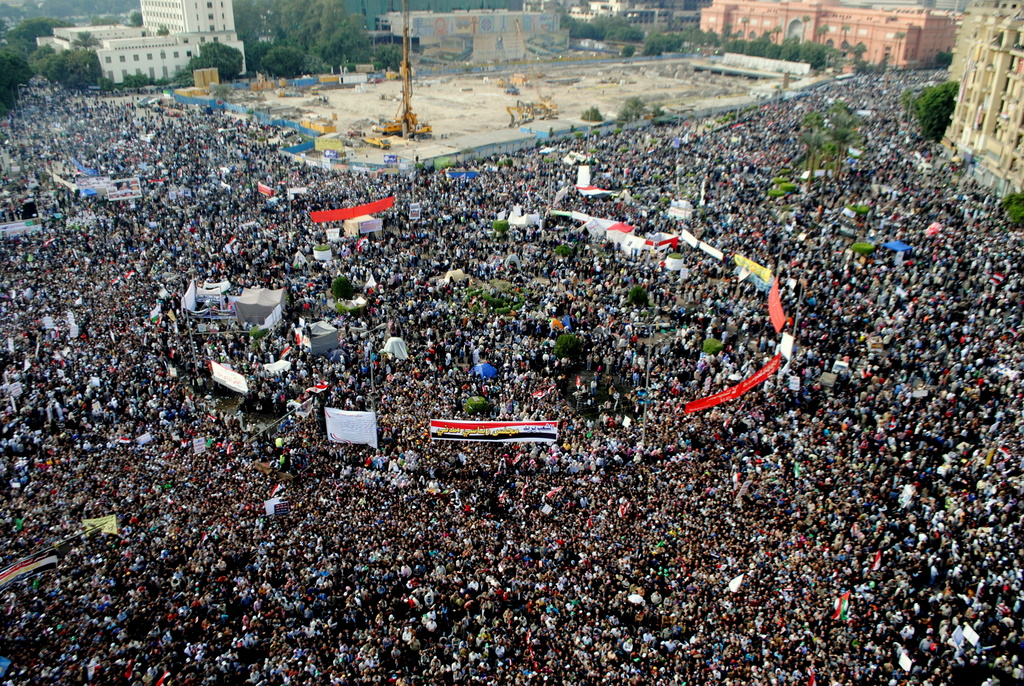

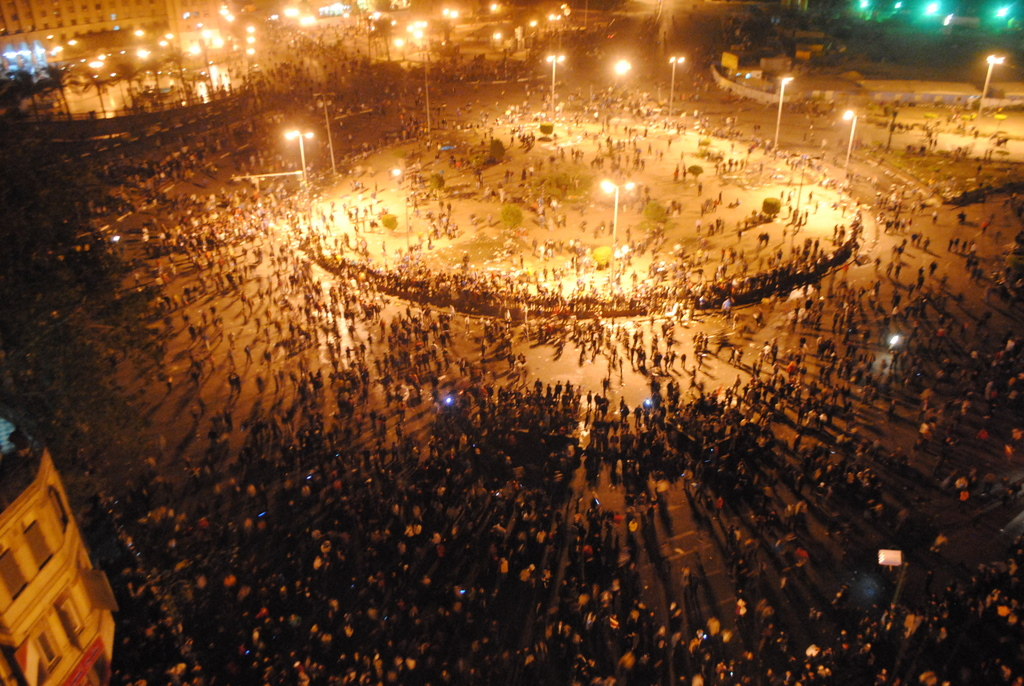

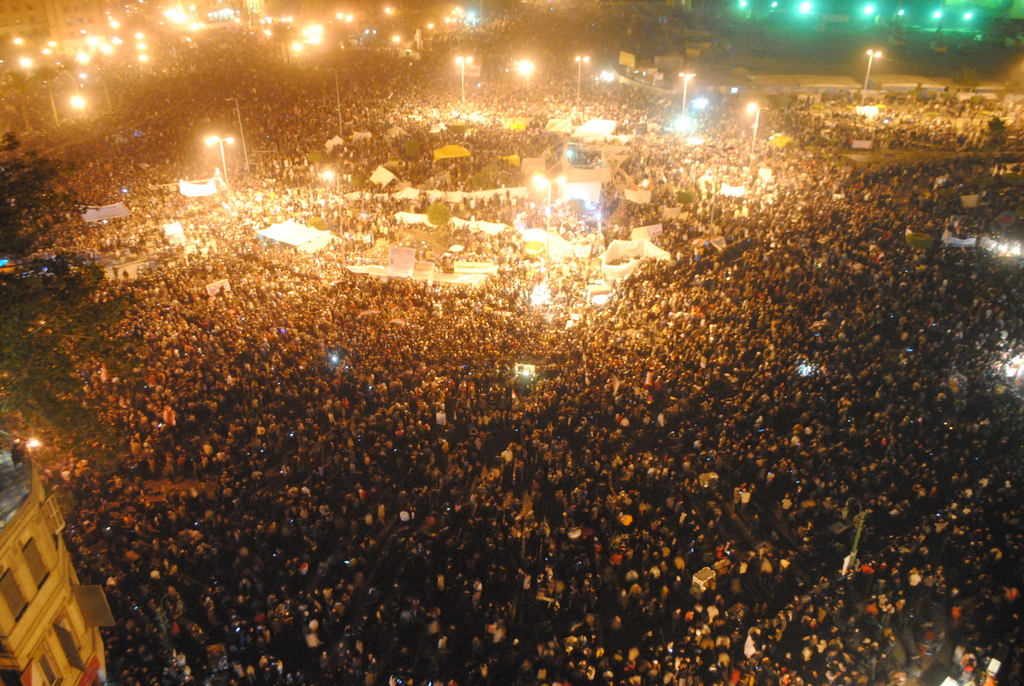

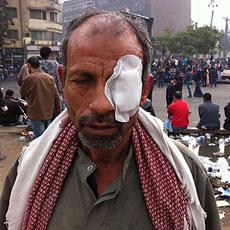
Man injured in clashes between Egyptian police and protesters angry at army's continuing political influence in Cairo, 20 November 2011

In November 2011, dissatisfied with the progress of the reforms, almost all civilian political parties called for an accelerated end to the military rule before drafting a constitution — either an immediate handover to a civilian-led government, or a turnover to the lower house of Parliament when it is seated in April, or after a presidential election, which would be scheduled as soon as possible. A major difference between Egyptian revolutionaries is that secular groups want the election to be postponed since they believe that the election would favor religious parties and well established groups like the Muslim Brotherhood while those parties want the parliamentary elections to be held on time. On the other hand they are united in their demand that the military should get out of politics and stop imposing restrictions on the future constitution and allow democratically elected representatives of Egyptians to freely write the new constitution.

The protesters are demanding the SCAF to step down from governing and politics, and hand over the authority to civilians. Other demands include banning former members of Hosni Mubarak's regime from running in the next election, and rejection of the military's super-constitution (which restricts the power of the future elected representative in writing the new constitution, gives the military the power to select up to 80 percent of the membership committee that writes the new constitution, and removes the possibility of civilian control of the military and Egypt's foreign policy which will allow the military to act as a state within a state in Egypt, a system similar to Turkey's Deep State before democratic reforms). The protesters state that the situation has not improved during the last 10 months under military government. Media and freedom of expression has become even more restricted, civilian political activists are being tried in military courts for insulting military, human rights situation has not improved, the emergency law (which gives government extra-ordinary powers and the right to ignore laws) continues, and the military junta continues to use the same methods that Mubarak was using. They are also angry at Field Marshal Tantavi's statement announced on TV which implies that military wants to remain involved in politics and will not return to barracks even after presidential elections.

On 19 November, two people were killed and 600 wounded in violent clashes after mass protests in Tahrir Square against the military junta regime. The protests started in reaction to the military unilaterally announcing a super-constitution that representatives elected for writing the constitution will not be able to change.

Egyptian medics say a police and army assault on anti-government protesters in Cairo has killed at least three people, raising the death toll in Egypt to at least five killed in two days of unrest. Police in Cairo lobbed teargas into crowds of protesters angry at the military government's continued role in political life. Demonstrators kept control of Tahrir Square Sunday morning, and vowed to keep their revolution alive.

Protesters demanding faster reforms and establishment of civilian government took to the Tahrir square in Cairo, and also in other cities, and clashed with the security forces. On 21 November 2011, after several days of violent demonstrations in which more than 33 protesters lost their lives and over 1,500 were wounded, the provisional government offered its resignation to the supreme military council in reaction to the use of force against the protesters.

At a crisis meeting on 22 November 2011 between the political and the military leaders, the parties agreed for a new interim government to be formed, and to proceed with the scheduled parliamentary election on 28 November, with a goal of holding a presidential election before the end of June 2012. Also on the same day, the US State Department condemned the excessive use of force against the demonstrators by the Egyptian security forces.

=== December ===
External videos
- Police brutality in Egypt on YouTube

Since Kamal Ganzouri was appointed prime minister, there has been a three-week protest sit-in, outside a government building near Tahrir square. In the morning of 16 December 2011, the army attempted to forcefully disperse the protesters. In the following days, 7 people were killed and violence has escalated.

On 19 December, Hillary Clinton US Secretary of State in a speech at Georgetown University in Washington, denounced the stripping and beating of a female protester and said that 'recent events in Egypt have been particularly shocking' and "women are being beaten and humiliated in the same streets where they risked their lives for the revolution only a few short months ago."

On 20 December, thousands of Egyptian women demonstrated against abuses by military police.

== 2012 ==
=== January ===
On 5 January 2012, a prosecutor in the trial of Hosni Mubarak demanded that he be sentenced to death by hanging, in connection with the killing of protesters during the 2011 Egyptian revolution that toppled his regime. On 11 January, the parliamentary elections officially concluded. On 24 January, Mohamed Hussein Tantawi, who was overseeing the country’s affairs, announced a partial lifting of the state of emergency, which had been in place for decades with the decision set to take effect the following day.

=== February ===
On 1 February 73 people were killed at a football game, in a stadium in Port Said. The riots began when fans of the team El Masry invaded the stadium, some of them carrying knives, and attacked fans of the rival team, Al Ahly. Initial media reports stated that more than 70 people were killed, with the death toll rising.

Numerous protests then took place, following this event. On Thursday, 2 February, protesters took to the streets of Cairo, enraged by the fact that the lax security had failed in preventing this tragedy from happening. Some of the protesters were heard chanting that Tantawi should be executed. The police then deployed tear gas, on the protesters.

=== March ===
On 17 March, Pope Shenouda III died, at the age of 88. His passing greatly affected the entire nation of Egypt, and especially the Coptic Christian community.

On 24 March, protesters took to the streets, angry that the football team El-Masry was banned for two more seasons, following the riots last month. The army then attacked the protesters. At least one person was killed, and at least 18 others were injured.

=== April ===
On 20 April, hundreds, possibly thousands, of protesters re-assembled in Cairo's Tahrir Square, demanding that the country's military rulers transfer power to a civilian government, sooner. They also wanted the Field Marshal, and leader of Egypt's military, Mohamed Hussein Tantawi, to step down.

On 14 April, several candidates in the upcoming presidential election were disqualified, for various reasons.

=== May ===
On 23–24 May, the first round of voting in the presidential elections took place. A number of people went to the polls, to vote. The two candidates with the highest number of votes were the Muslim Brotherhood's replacement candidate, Mohamed Morsi, and Hosni Mubarak's last Prime Minister, Ahmed Shafik.

On 31 May, the decades-old State of Emergency was finally completely lifted, in Egypt.

=== June ===
On 2 June, former Egyptian President Hosni Mubarak was sentenced to life in prison, for complicity in the killings of protesters by police, during the revolution that eventually toppled him, in 2011. However, the judge also found him not guilty, on corruption charges. This, and the fact that he had not received the death penalty, led protesters to immediately take to the streets, directly after the verdict was announced. On 14 June, Egypt's Constitutional Court ruled that a law preventing members of Hosni Mubarak's former government from running for President was unconstitutional, therefore letting Ahmed Shafik remain in the presidential race. The court also ruled that the mainly Islamist-led Parliament, should be dissolved. Both of these verdicts also led to protests, as well.

On 16–17 June, the second round of voting in the presidential elections took place. Both candidates claimed that they had won the election, and each accused the other of cheating. The results of the presidential election were initially going to be officially announced, on Thursday, 21 June. However, this date was later postponed.

On 18 June, the Muslim Brotherhood announced that its candidate, Morsi, had won the election. On the same day, the ruling military junta, (which is scheduled to transfer power to the newly elected President on 30 June), made a statement, in which they severely restricted the powers, of the Presidency. This led to huge protests in Tahrir Square, the biggest since those that eventually ousted Mubarak, more than a year earlier. A number of the protesters were members of the Muslim Brotherhood. On 19 June, the protests continued. Protesters rallied in Tahrir Square in Cairo, accusing the SCAF of planning a coup, and demanding that it back down.

The results of the presidential election were officially announced on 24 June 2012. It was announced that Morsi had narrowly beat Shafik, gaining 52% of the votes, while Shafik got 48% of them. Right after the announcement, Morsi supporters in Tahrir Square celebrated their victory. It has also been noted that this is the first time since Hosni Mubarak's resignation, on 11 February 2011, that celebrations of this magnitude have occurred, in Egypt. However, even after the results of the presidential election were announced, a number of protesters still remained, in Tahrir Square. They were protesting the apparent power grab by the Supreme Council of the Armed Forces.

On 30 June 2012, Morsi was sworn in as the fifth President of Egypt. This marked the first time in Egypt's history that a civilian president has been elected by the people. In the past, all of the other presidents were either from the military or had a military background.

The inauguration of Morsi led to the third wave of the revolution.
