= Subhi Saleh =

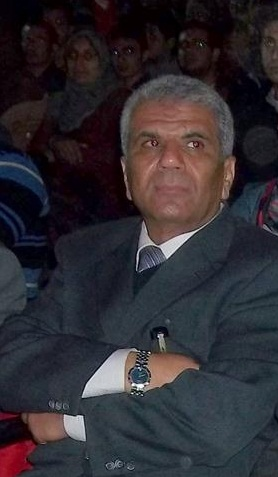
Sobhi Saleh Moussa

Sobhi Saleh Moussa (born September 19, 1953) is an Egyptian lawyer and a prominent member of the Muslim Brotherhood. From 2005 to 2010, he represented the Alexandria district of Ramla in the Parliament of Egypt, belonging to the Muslim Brotherhood bloc. On April 2, 2003, he was arrested (along with other members of Alexandria's Muslim Brotherhood leadership). On February 15, 2011, he was appointed to the Egyptian constitutional review committee of 2011.

He was jailed for three days during the events of the Egyptian Revolution of 2011.
