= 2011 Egyptian constitutional referendum =

- 19 March 2011

Results
Choice	Votes	%
Yes	14,192,577	77.27%
No	4,174,187	22.73%
Valid votes	18,366,764	99.08%
Invalid or blank votes	171,190	0.92%
Total votes	18,537,954	100.00%
Registered voters/turnout		41.9%
- Results by governorate Yes: 60–70% 70–80% 80–90% 90–100%
- Source: Referendum.eg

A constitutional referendum was held in Egypt on 19 March 2011, following the 2011 Egyptian revolution. More than 14 million (77%) Egyptians voted in favour of the proposed constitutional changes, while around 4 million (23%) opposed the changes; 41% of 45 million eligible voters turned out to vote.

The approved constitutional reforms included a limitation on the presidency to two four-year terms, judicial supervision of elections, a requirement for the president to appoint at least one vice president, a commission to draft a new constitution following the parliamentary election, and easier access to presidential elections by candidates—via 30,000 signatures from at least 15 provinces, 30 members of a chamber of the legislature, or nomination by a party holding at least one seat in the legislature.

The reforms were recognised by both sides to increase democratic safeguards, but opponents argued that they did not go far enough and that an election held too soon could favour the well-organised Muslim Brotherhood and members of the former ruling National Democratic Party of Hosni Mubarak. Supporters cited concerns that waiting too long could increase the chances of the military regaining power or risk destabilisation before an election.

A parliamentary election was planned within the next six months, with groups already working to create new political parties, promote candidates and increase turnout among their supporters.

== Background ==
The 1971 constitution was suspended by the Supreme Council of the Armed Forces on 13 February 2011, two days after the resignation of Hosni Mubarak. It then organised a committee of jurists to draft amendments to pave the way for new parliamentary and presidential elections.

Had the referendum resulted in a "no" vote, the 1971 constitution would have been nullified and a new one was to be drawn up before elections, which would likely have extended the planned transition period until an election to 2012.

== Older constitutional articles ==
1. Article 75 of the Constitution of Egypt provides for minimum qualifications of the office of President.
2. Article 76 of the Constitution of Egypt provides for the method of nomination and election of the President.
3. Article 77 of the Constitution of Egypt provides for the term of office of the President.
4. Article 88 of the Constitution of Egypt provides for the method of election of Members of the People's Assembly.
5. Article 93 of the Constitution of Egypt provides for the method of challenging the election of Members of the People's Assembly.
6. Article 148 of the Constitution of Egypt provides for the imposition of a State of Emergency.
7. Article 179 of the Constitution of Egypt allows the President to authorize all courts (including military courts) to try people charged of terrorism.
8. Article 189 of the Constitution of Egypt provides for the Amendment method of the Constitution.

== Proposed amendments ==
Summary

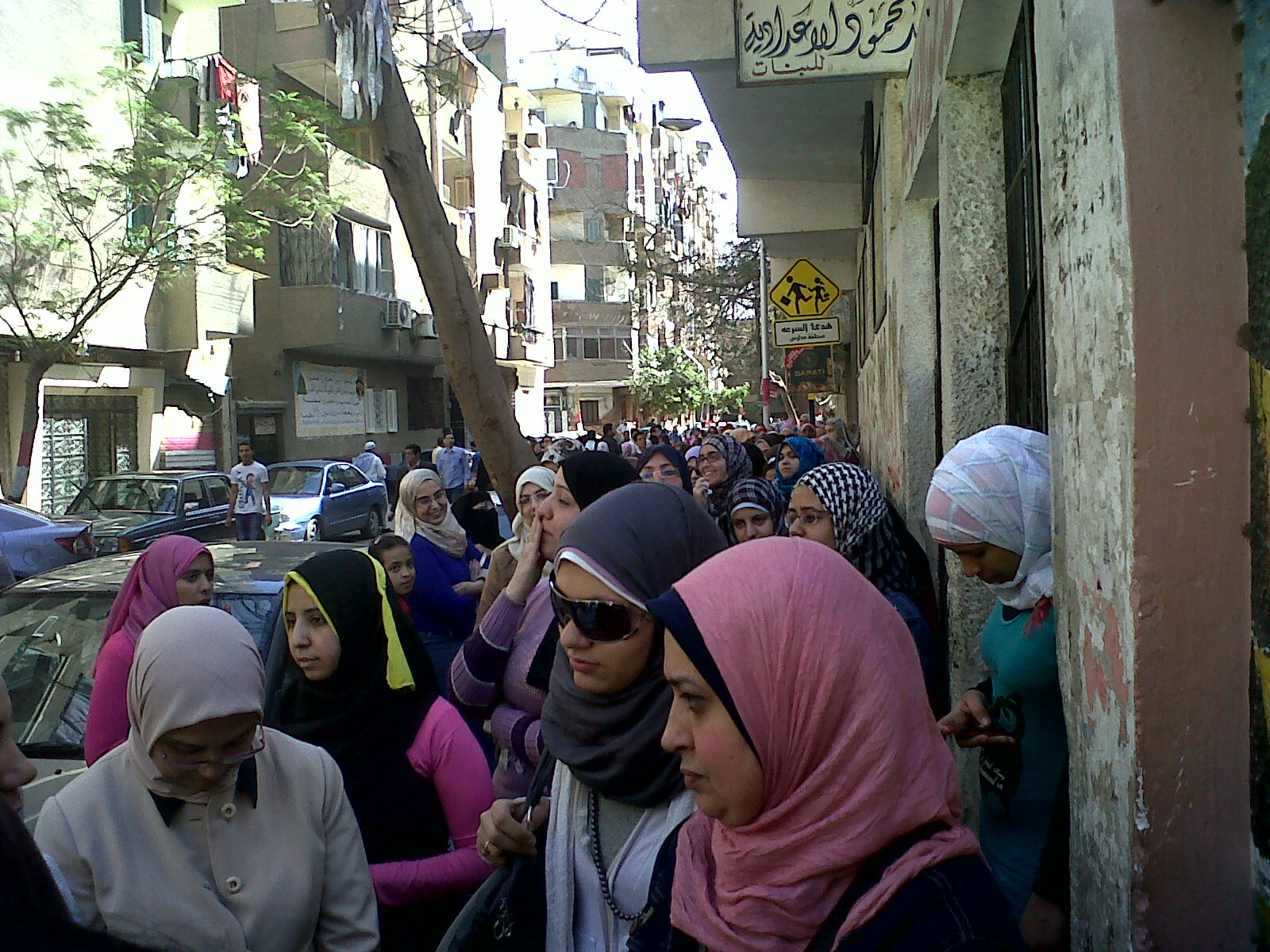
Women standing in line to vote on the 2011 Egyptian constitutional referendum

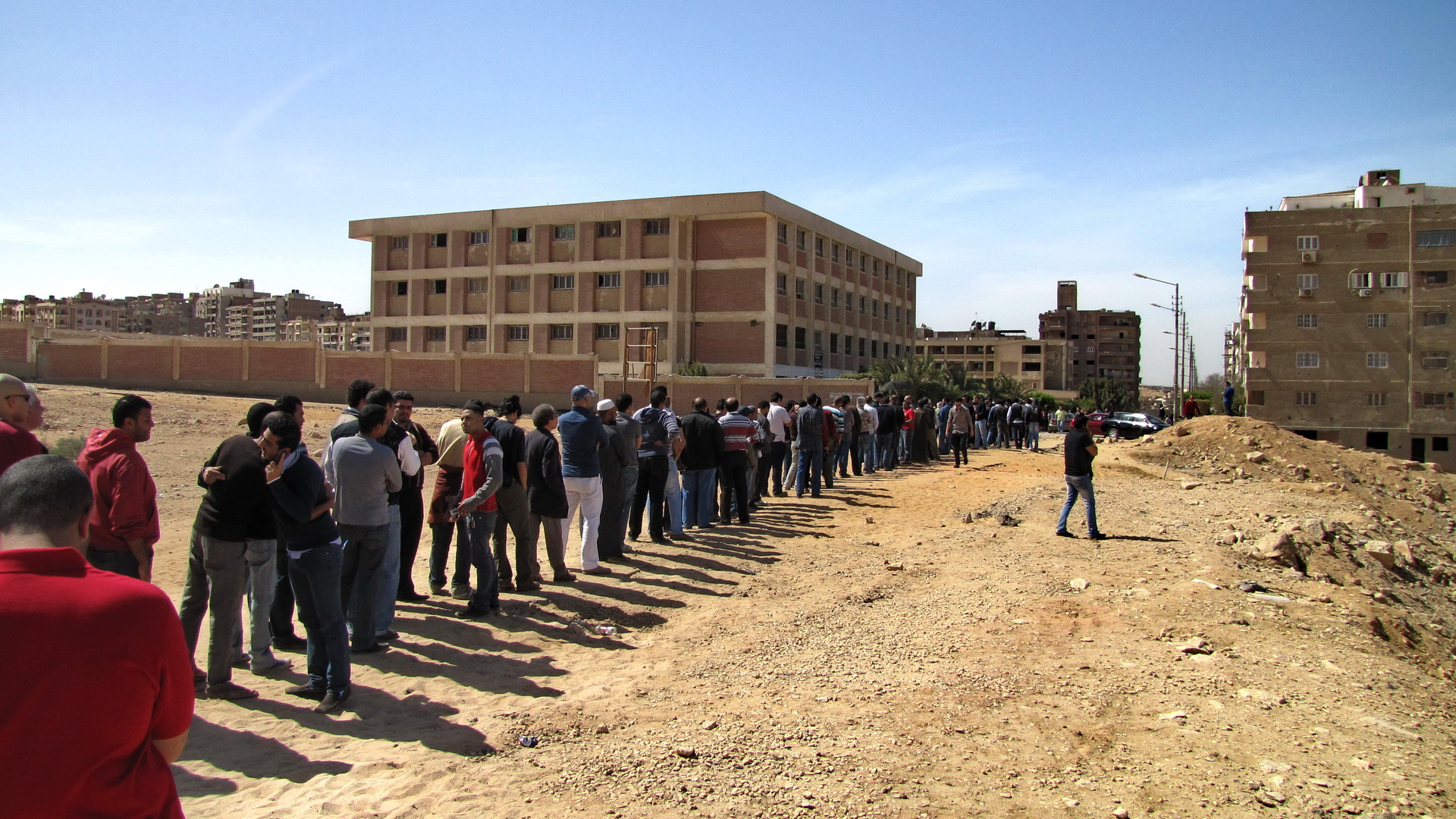
The men's line during the referendum, in the up-scale neighborhood of Mokattam Hill in Cairo

The proposed amendments include the following:

- Article 75: A candidate would be ineligible if he or she had dual nationality, parents who were citizens of countries other than Egypt or married to a non-Egyptian.
- Article 76: Easing the requirements for being a presidential candidate.
- Article 77: Limiting the terms a president can serve to two consecutive terms, each four years only.
- Article 88: The juridical system is responsible for monitoring the election process.
- Article 93: would give the highest appeal court the power to rule on challenges to disputed parliamentary races, whereas before only the parliament could decide.
- Article 139: The president must appoint a vice-president within 60 days of the start of the term
- Article 148: would impose new restrictions on the president declaring a state of emergency, including requiring the approval of a parliamentary majority, and says it cannot exceed six months unless it is extended through a referendum.
- (Article 179): would be canceled. The article allows the president to use military courts for "terror" cases even for civilians.
- (Article 189): Require the newly elected parliament to write a new constitution within 60 days.

Article 75

The committee proposed a number of qualifications for a person seeking to nominate themselves in presidential elections, including:

- The nominee must be an Egyptian citizen
- Both of the nominee’s parents must be Egyptian citizens
- The nominee must not be under a suspension of political and civic rights
- Neither the nominee nor the nominee’s parents may have held foreign citizenship
- The nominee must not be married to a foreigner
- The nominee must be at least 40 years of age

Article 76

The committee proposed 3 tracks for nomination which candidates may choose in presidential elections:

1. Nominees must win the endorsement of 30 elected members of Parliament;
2. Nominees must win the endorsement of 30,000 registered voters from 15 governorates with at least 1000 endorsements from each of those governorates;
3. Parties with at least one elected seat in parliament may nominate one of their members in presidential elections.

Members of Parliament and voters may not endorse the nomination of more than 1 candidate for president.

Article 77

The committee proposed that the term of the President be reduced to four years and that a limit of two terms be adopted.

The issue of limiting presidential powers was postponed until after the elections as part of the new constitution drafting process.

Article 88

The committee proposed that elections and referendums, from voter registration to the announcement of results, be administered and supervised by an all-judge High Elections Commission, whose composition and mandate will be defined by law.

Members of the judiciary nominated by the supreme councils of the judicial agencies and appointed by the High Elections Commission will supervise ballot casting and counting.

Article 93

The Committee proposed that competence to determine the validity of membership of parliamentarians be transferred from parliament to the Supreme Constitutional Court. Challenges to the validity of the membership of a parliamentarian must be filed with the Court within 30 days of the election of the parliamentarian in question and decided upon by the Court within 90 days. The ruling the Court would be final.

Article 139

The committee proposed that the president be required to appoint one or more vice-presidents within 60 days of taking office, and that the president shall determine them and of the vice-president. If the vice-president is dismissed from office, the president must appoint a replacement.

The same qualifications that apply to the presidency would also apply to the vice-president. (See Article 75)

Article 148

The Committee proposed that the consent of a majority of the members of the People’s Assembly be required to declare a state of emergency. In addition, the Committee proposed that the state of emergency could only be declared for a period of up to 6 months. Also, a renewal of the state of emergency would require a popular referendum.

The committee proposed that if the President declares a state of emergency then the People’s Assembly must review the decision within seven days of the declaration. If the People’s Assembly is not in session at the time, the President must immediately call it to session. If the People’s Assembly is dissolved the declaration must be reviewed by it in its first session.

Article 179

The committee proposed that the Article be stricken from the constitution. No further information available.

Article 189 and 189 repeated

The committee proposed that that Shura Council function without it appointment members until such time as a president is elected to fill the appointment of 1/3 of its seats

The committee proposed that the president or at least half the members of the People’s Assembly and the Shura Council may request the drafting of a new constitution.

The committee proposed that within six months of their election the elected members of the People’s Assembly and the Shura Council must appoint, by majority vote, a 100-member constituent assembly to draft a new constitution. The constituent assembly would have to complete the draft within six months of its creation, and within 15 days of the completion of the draft constitution the president must call for a referendum on it.

== Polls ==
A 13 March poll by the Egyptian government on its Information and Decision Support Center website said that 24,121 Egyptians (57 percent of the total number of voters) would vote against the amendments, while 15,173 Egyptians (37 percent) supported them. Five percent were undecided.

== Campaign ==
A diagram that explains the 2011 Egyptian Constitutional Referendum process based on a Yes or No vote on 19 March 2011

The Egyptian military called for a media silence over the referendum. It also set up a committee to review the proposed amendments. Later saying it would help to secure a vote on the proposed amendments.

Though 16,000 members of the judiciary were scheduled to supervise the referendum, 2000 judges threatened to boycott the supervisory process.

Amidst other controversy, a court ruled against canceling the referendum following an appeal.

=== Opponents ===
External videos
- An AD asking people to vote NO by many celebrities, public and political figures on YouTube
- Another AD asking people to vote NO by many celebrities, public and political figures on YouTube

An opposition coalition (including presidential candidates Amr Moussa and Mohamed ElBaradei, the New Wafd Party, the Coalition of the Youth of the Revolution, the National Progressive Unionist Party, the el-Ghad Party and the Egyptian Arab Socialist Party) criticised the proposed amendments as not enough and that the new constitution needs to be written immediately to regulate the process and the requirements for members of parliament. They also said that the President's power was not limited enough under the proposed changes.

The Christian Church was also opposed to the amendments, as was the reformist faction of the Muslim Brotherhood.

=== Proponents ===
The Muslim Brotherhood and the Salafi movement (including preachers such as Sheikh Mohammed Hassan and Mohammed Abdel Maksoud), among other Islamist groups, think that the amendments are suitable for the time being and that the situation in Egypt is not suitable to write a new constitution at the moment. They have suggested that Article 2 of the constitution (which states that "Islam is the Religion of the State. Arabic is its official language, and the principal source of legislation is Islamic Jurisprudence") will be removed or altered if the proposed changes are not approved even though the constitutional amendment committee said that Article 2 will not be touched. Sheikh Yusuf al-Qaradawi advised Egyptians to approve the referendum. The NDP also have asked their base to vote Yes.

The Muslim Brotherhood and the NDP are also perceived to be in favour of an approval because early elections could benefit them the most as they already have the biggest grassroots support while smaller and newly founded parties would have little time to prepare for elections in the planned schedule.

== Election ==
=== Voting issues ===
External videos
- ElBaradei Attacked by Voters on YouTube

- Some sheikhs took the platforms on Friday and focused in their sermons to call onto worshipers to vote yes.
- The Egyptian Coptic Church and other Christian denominations in Egypt have called their Christian faithful to vote No.
- Mohamed ElBaradei was attacked by men throwing rocks at him as he tried to vote in Mokattam. He left without voting and later voted elsewhere.
- A Salafist hang a sign, which distinguish between those who are voting yes, and those voting no in front of a committee.
- The two women wearing a niqāb distributed leaflets calling for a vote yes in front of a committee.

== Results ==
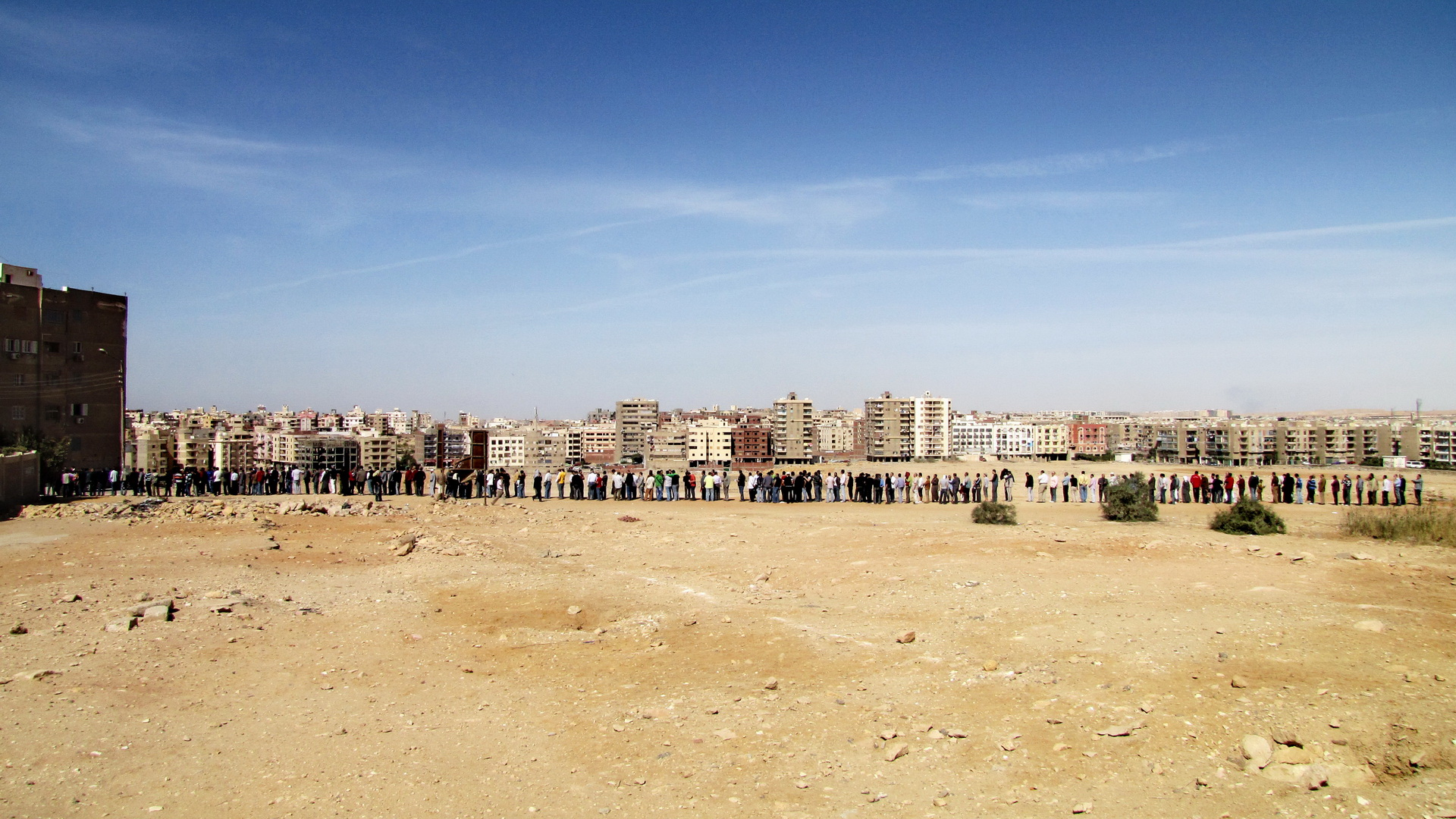
Another view of the men's line in Mokattam during the referendum. The queue was so long it extended well outside the built-up area and into the desert.

Choice	Votes	%
For	14,192,577	77.27
Against	4,174,187	22.73
Total	18,366,764	100.00
Valid votes	18,366,764	99.08
Invalid/blank votes	171,190	0.92
Total votes	18,537,954	100.00
Source: Supreme Judicial Committee

=== By governorate ===
Governorate	Total votes	Valid votes	Invalid votes	For		Against	
Governorate	Total votes	Valid votes	Invalid votes	Votes	%	Votes	%
Cairo	2,306,561	2,283,363	23,198	1,381,738	59.9	901,625	39.1
Alexandria	1,524,387	1,513,552	10,835	1,015,945	66.6	497,607	32.6
Sharqia	1,226,799	1,217,353	9,446	1,054,749	85.9	162,604	13.3
Minya	1,121,260	1,106,817	14,443	848,101	69.1	258,716	21.1
Dakahlia	1,104,724	1,096,905	7,819	874,384	79.1	222,521	20.1
Beheira	1,070,733	1,061,796	8,937	931,338	87.0	130,458	12.2
Qalyubia	960,883	952,647	8,236	771,667	80.3	180,980	18.8
Gharbia	933,732	926,005	7,727	729,920	73.5	196,085	21.0
Giza	907,696	895,908	11,788	610,779	67.3	285,129	31.4
Asyut	803,827	794,085	9,742	583,304	72.6	210,781	26.2
Monufia	759,415	753,598	5,817	652,952	86.0	100,646	13.3
Sohag	751,180	744,481	6,699	585,514	77.9	158,967	21.2
Helwan	601,720	596,886	4,834	429,821	71.4	167,065	27.7
6th of October	574,399	568,256	6,143	479,716	83.5	88,540	15.4
Beni Suef	568,437	562,955	5,482	492,441	86.6	70,514	12.4
Kafr el-Sheikh	568,336	564,392	3,944	496,191	87.3	68,201	12.0
Faiyum	544,128	538,536	5,592	486,011	89.3	52,525	9.7
Qena	452,480	449,898	2,582	387,292	85.6	62,606	13.8
Damietta	332,342	330,083	2,259	273,218	82.2	56,865	17.1
Ismailia	253,328	250,907	2,421	195,428	77.1	55,479	21.9
Aswan	247,885	245,479	2,406	203,449	82.1	42,030	17.0
Port Said	213,666	211,377	2,289	149,635	70.0	61,742	29.0
Luxor	203,683	201,467	2,216	164,241	80.6	37,226	18.3
Suez	173,106	171,075	2,031	134,864	77.9	36,211	20.9
Red Sea	104,233	102,437	1,796	64,924	62.3	37,513	36.0
Matruh	84,555	83,628	927	77,283	91.4	6,345	7.5
North Sinai	63,974	63,318	656	54,604	85.4	8,714	13.6
New Valley	41,357	40,890	467	37,186	89.9	3,704	9.0
South Sinai	39,128	38,670	458	25,882	66.1	12,788	32.7
Source: Supreme Judicial Committee
