= Tarek El-Bishry =

Egyptian judge (1933–2021)

Tarek El-Bishry (Arabic: طارق عبد الفتاح سليم البشري, IPA: [ˈtˤɑːɾˤeʔ ʕæbdelfætˈtæːħ seˈliːm elˈbeʃɾi]; 1 November 1933 – 26 February 2021) was an Egyptian judge. On 15 February 2011, El-Bishry was appointed by the Supreme Council of the Armed Forces to head the committee set up to propose constitutional changes in the aftermath of the Egyptian Revolution of 2011.

== Biography ==
El-Bishry was born in Cairo, Egypt. His grandfather, Saliem el-Bishry, was shaykh of al-Azhar from 1900 to 1904 and 1909–1916. His father, 'Abd al-Fattah al-Bishri, was president of the Egyptian Court of Appeal until his death in 1951. His uncle, 'Abd al-'Aziz, was a celebrated writer. He has two sons, 'emad and Zyad.

El-Bishry graduated from the Faculty of Law at Cairo University in 1953. Upon graduation, he was appointed after the Council of State, where he worked until his retirement in 1998. At the time of his retirement, he held the offices of first deputy (Al-na'ib al-awwal) to the Council of State and Chairman of its General Assembly for Legislation and Consultation (Al-jama'iya al-'umumiya lil-fatawa wal-tashri').

El-Bishry was once a secular leftist, but became a prominent "moderate Islamic" political thinker, which earned him respect as a bridge between the movements.

El-Bishry was named in 2008 by Hamdy Kandeel, a prominent Egyptian television and radio personality, as a suitable candidate for the 2011 Egyptian presidential elections, during an interview led by Amr Adeeb.

He died on 26 February 2021, in Cairo from complications related to COVID-19, during the COVID-19 pandemic in Egypt. He was 87.

== Works ==
He was a prolific writer on questions of law, history, and Islamic and social thought:

- Al-ʻArab fī muwājahat al-ʻudwān (العرب في مواجهة العدوان).
- Al-Ḥiwār al-Qawmī-al-Dīnī : awrāq ʻamal wa-munāqashāt al-nadwah al-fikrīyah allatī naẓẓamahā Markaz Dirāsāt al-Waḥdah al-ʻArabīyah (الحوار القومي الديني : اوراق عمل ومناقشات الندوة الفكرية التي نظمها مركز دراسات الوحدة العربية).
- Al-Ummah fī ʻām : taqrīr ḥawlī ʻan al-shuʼūn al-siyāsīyah wa-al-iqtiṣādīyah al-Miṣrīyah (الأمة في عام : تقرير حولي عن الشئون السياسية والاقتصادية المصرية).
- Al-Islām wa-al-taṭarruf al-dīnī (الإسلام والتطرف الديني).
- Miṣr bayna al-ʻiṣyān wa-al-tafakkuk (مصر بين العصيان والتفكك).
- Al-Qaḍāʼ al-Miṣrī bayna al-istiqlāl wa-al-iḥtiwāʼ (القضاء المصري بين الاستقلال والاحتواء).
- Ḥarakah al-siyāsīyah fī Miṣr, [1945-1952] (حركة السياسية في مصر [1945-1952]).
- Al-Malāmiḥ al-ʻāmmah lil-fikr al-siyāsī al-Islāmī fī al-tārīkh al-muʻāṣir (الملامح العامة للفكر السياسي الإسلامي في التاريخ المعاصر).
- Al-Waḍʻ al-qānūnī al-muʻāṣir bayna al-sharīʻah al-Islāmīyah wa-al-qānūn al-waḍʻī (الوضع القانونى المعاصر بين الشريعة الإسلامية والقانون الوضعى).
- Al-Dīmūqrātīyah wa-al-Nāṣirīyah (الديموقراطية والناصرية).
- Dawr al-thaqāfah fī taḥqīq al-wifāq al-ʻArabī (دور الثقافة فى تحقيق الوفاق العربى).
- Al-Jamāʻah al-waṭanīyah : al-ʻuzlah wa-al-indimāj (الجماعة الوطنية : العزلة والإندماج).
- Manhaj al-naẓar fī al-nuẓum al-siyāsīyah al-muʻāṣirah li-buldān al-ʻālam al-Islāmī (منهج النظر في النظم السياسية المعاصرة لبلدان العالم الإسلامي).
- Shakhṣīyāt wa-qaḍāyā muʻāṣirah (شخصيات وقضايا معاصرة).
- Mustaqbal al-ḥiwār al-islāmī al-ʻalmānī
- Mushkilatān wa-qirāʼah fīhimā (مشكلتان وقراءة فيهما).
- Saʻd Zaghlūl yufāwiḍu al-istiʻmār : dirāsah fī al-mufāwaḍāt al-Miṣrīyah al-Barīṭānīyah, 1920-1924 (سعد زغلول يفاوض الاستعمار : دراسة في المفاوضات المصرية البريطانية، 1920-1924).
- Bayna al-Islām wa-al-ʻUrūbah (بين الإسلام والعروبة).
- Al-Dīmūqrāṭīyah wa-niẓām 23 Yūliyū 1952-1970 (الديمقراطية ونظام ٢٣ يوليو، ١٩٥٢-١٩٧٠).
- Dirāsāt fī al-dīmuqrāṭīyah al-Miṣrīyah (دراسات في الديمقراطية المصرية).
- Al-Ḥarakah al-siyāsīyah fī Miṣr, 1945-1952 (الحركة السياسية في مصر، ١٩٤٥-١٩٥٢).
- Al-Muslimūn wa-al-Aqbāt fī iṭār al-jamāʻah al-waṭanīyah (المسلمون والأقباط في إطار الجماعة الوطنية).
- Bayna al-jāmiʻah al-dīnīyah wa-al-jāmiʻah al-waṭanīyah fī al-fikr al-siyāsī.
- Fi al-mas'alah al-Islamiyah al-mu'asirah bayna al-Islam wa al-'Urubah.
- Māhiyāt al-muʻāṣarah.
- Shakhṣīyāt tārīkhīyah.
- Buḥūth muʼtamar miʼawīyat al-Imām al-Bannā : al-mashrūʻ al-iṣlāḥī lil-Imām Ḥasan al-Bannā : tasāʼulāt li-qarn jadīd (بحوث مؤتمر مئوية الامام البنا : المشروع الاصلاحي للامام حسن البنا : تساؤلات لقرن جديد).
- Ummatī fī al-ʻālam : ḥawlīyat qaḍāyā al-ʻālam al-Islāmī, 1419-1420 H/1999 M (أمتي في العالم : حولية قضايا العالم الإسلامي ١٤١٩-١٤٢٠ ه /١٩٩٩م).
