= Egyptian constitutional review committee of 2011 =

A committee was formed in February 2011 by the Egyptian military following the suspension of the constitution during the 2011 Egyptian revolution. The committee's purpose is to review the constitution of Egypt, to be ratified by a referendum.

== Aims and composition ==
The eight-member committee tasked with amending the constitution was composed of legal experts of various ideologies, including secular liberal scholars, three serving judges of the Supreme Constitutional Court, and a Christian.

=== Members ===
- Tarek El-Bishry was appointed as the head of the committee.
- Subhi Saleh, lawyer, former member of parliament, and member of the Muslim Brotherhood.
- Maher Sami Yussef, counselor to the President of the Supreme Constitutional Court.
- Hassan El Badrawi, vice president of the Constitutional Court.
- Hatem Bagatou, president of the consultative commission of the Supreme Constitutional Court.
- Mohamed Hassaneim Abdel Al, former dean of the law school at Cairo University.
- Mahmoud Atef El Bana, constitutional law professor at Cairo University.
- Mohamed Bahey Abou Younis, of the College of Law at Alexandria University.

== Amendment proposals ==
A constitutional amendment proposal announced on 26 February 2011 proposed to amend Articles 76, 77, 88, 93, 139, 148 and 189 and to remove Article 179. Changes to Article 76 would make it easier to become a presidential candidate. Either 30,000 signatures from at least 15 governorates (provinces), 30 members of a chamber of the legislature, or nomination by a party holding at least a seat in the legislature. The proposed changes to Article 77 would limit the President to two terms of four years in office. Changes to Articles 88 and 93 would restore judicial supervision of elections and allow the Constitutional Court of Egypt to control the validity of membership of parliament. The proposed amendment to Article 139 would oblige the president to appoint a vice-president. It was also proposed that a commission drafts a new constitution following the parliamentary election.

The issue of limiting presidential powers was postponed until after the elections as part of the new constitution drafting process.

== See also ==
- Constitution of Egypt
- Egyptian constitutional referendum, 2011
