= 35th Paratroopers Brigade =

Elite Israel Defense Forces unit

- Paratroopers Brigade insignia
- Active: 1955 – present
- Country: Israel
- Branch: Israeli Ground Forces
- Type: Paratrooper
- Role: Airborne infantry Special reconnaissance
- Size: 4 battalions
- Part of: 98th Paratroopers Division (Reserve), Infantry Corps
- Mottos: !אחרי לצנחנים (After me, to the paratroopers!)
- Colors: Maroon beret, Red & White Flag
- March: "Kol Hazman Tzanchan" (Always a paratrooper)
- Mascot: Winged Snake (Shfifon)
- Engagements: Suez Crisis (Mitla Pass); Six-Day War; War of Attrition; Operation Rhodes; Operation Entebbe; Second Intifada; 2006 Lebanon War; Gaza War (2008–2009); Operation Brother's Keeper; 2014 Gaza War; Gaza war; 2024 Israeli invasion of Lebanon

Commanders
- Current commander: Colonel Ami Bitton
- Notable commanders: Ariel Sharon, Rafael Eitan, Moshe Ya'alon, Aviv Kohavi, Herzi Halevi

Insignia
- Flag

The 35th Paratroopers Brigade (Hebrew: חֲטִיבַת הַצַּנְחָנִים, Ḥativat HaTzanḥanim) is an Israeli military airborne infantry brigade. It is a selective unit, which accepts new recruits following physical tryouts and interviews, and consists of volunteers. It forms a major part of the Israeli Ground Forces' Infantry Corps, and has a history of carrying out special operations from the 1950s onwards. Soldiers of the brigade wear maroon berets with the Infantry Corps pin and russet boots.

As part of an Israel Defense Forces (IDF) tradition unique to the brigade, its soldiers wear a tunic and belt over their shirts. The IDF maintains four reserve paratrooper brigades, currently the 55th, 226th, 551st and 646th, at all times, whose enlisted personnel consist of reservists that have already completed their compulsory military service in the 35th Brigade.

== History ==
In 1949 Chaim Laskov asked Machalnik Captain Tom Derek Bowden to create a paratroop school. He did so, writing a training manual with the help of his Hebrew-speaking secretary Eva Heilbronner and training soldiers with British Army surplus equipment. Bowden returned to England in 1950.

The brigade was created in the mid-1950s when the commando Unit 101 was merged with the 890th Battalion (the IDF's Airborne Commando unit) in order to form an elite infantry brigade. The new unit was equipped with the IMI Uzi submachine gun as their primary weapon as it provided light and small automatic fire, essential properties for recon units and commandos.

The goals in creating the Paratroopers Brigade were:

1. To have an elite leading force.
2. To innovate and improve fighting skills within other units.
3. To raise the next generation of military commanders and officers.

The first commander of the Paratroopers Brigade was Ariel Sharon.

The Paratroopers Brigade has had only one operational combat parachute drop, during the 1956 Sinai War. In the Six-Day War (1967) reservists from this unit, formed into the 55th Paratroopers Brigade, took part in the capture of Jerusalem, along with the Jerusalem Brigade, Harel Brigade and armored support. The 55th Brigade paratroopers were the ones to capture the Western Wall and the Temple Mount, considered a historic moment and the highlight of the war by the Israeli public due to the sanctity of these places to the Jewish people.

Over the years, the Paratroopers Brigade has been the source of several future Israeli Chiefs of Staff, including Shaul Mofaz, Moshe Ya'alon, Benny Gantz and Aviv Kochavi.

== Selection and training ==
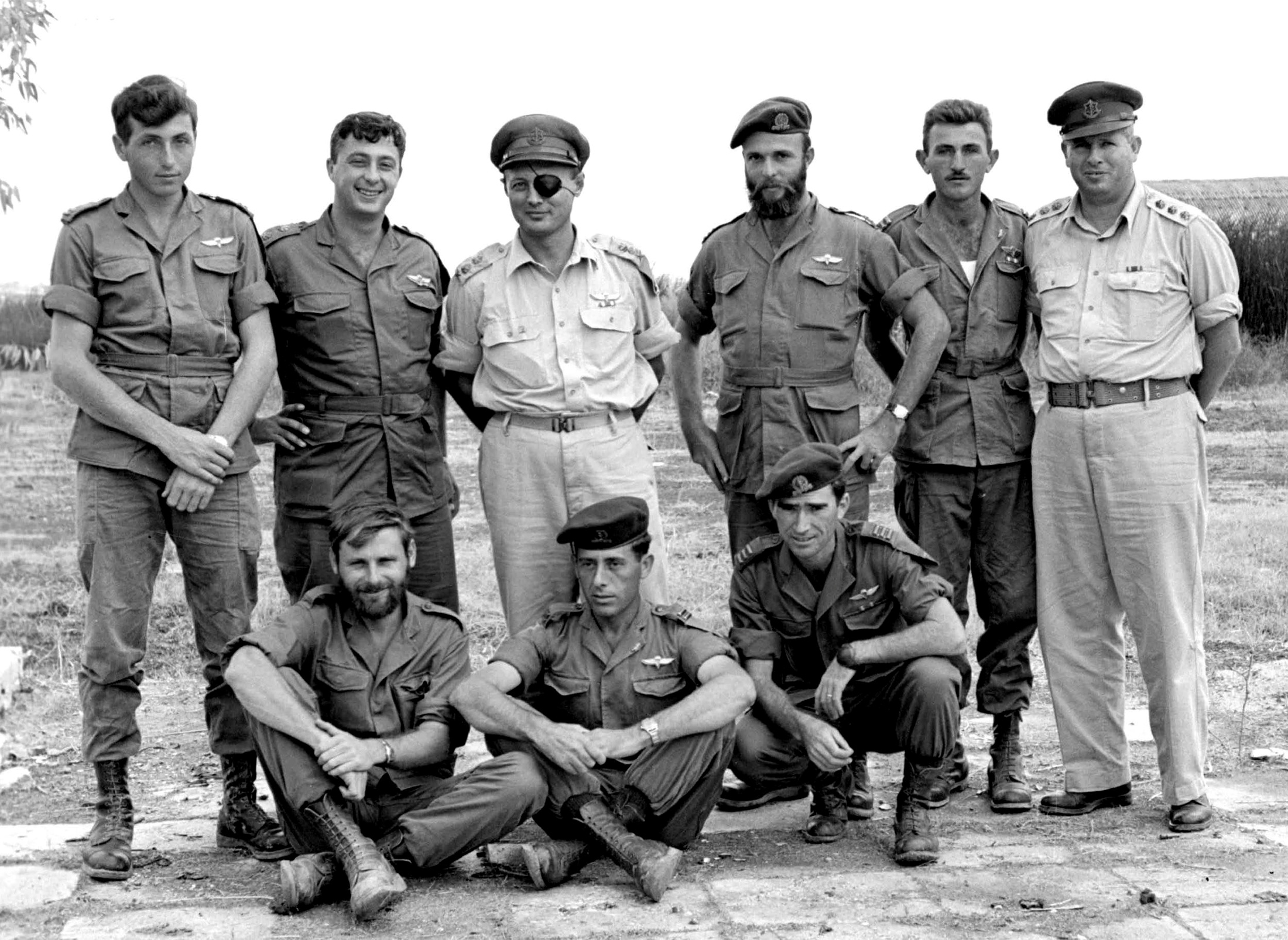
Members of 890th Paratroop Battalion after Operation Egged (November 1955). Standing l to r: Lt. Meir Har-Zion, Maj. Ariel Sharon, Lt. Gen Moshe Dayan, Capt. Danny Matt, Lt. Moshe Efron, Maj. Gen Asaf Simhoni; On ground, l to r: Capt. Aharon Davidi, Lt. Ya'akov Ya'akov, Capt. Rafael Eitan

Service in the Paratroopers is voluntary and requires passing an intense two-day selection process that includes tests of physical fitness as well as emotional preparedness, leadership skills and the ability to cooperate in a group. Each year the brigade receives five times more applicants than it can accept. Paratrooper recruits go through a year of training, and more than a quarter drop out.

The paratrooper training course includes fitness training, Krav Maga training, harsh combat skills, specializing in a wide range of weapons, field craft, long marches with heavy equipment, weeks of survival training including navigation and camouflage, helicopter training, jump training, collaboration with other units, close quarters combat, and urban warfare. The course begins with four months of basic infantry training followed by advanced training that ends with a "Beret March", where recruits march 80 kilometers in full combat gear, after which they are inducted into the IDF.

== Battles and operations ==
=== Reprisal operations ===
The Paratroopers Brigade played a key role in the Reprisal operations, a series of retaliatory raids into Arab territory in response to fedayeen attacks on Israel. In 1955, the 890th battalion of the Paratroopers Brigade carried out Operation Elkayam, successfully attacking Egyptian military positions in the Khan Yunis area of the Gaza Strip. This was followed up with Operation Volcano, a successful raid by paratroopers together with Nahal Brigade and Golani Brigade infantry against Egyptian military positions on the Egyptian-Israeli border.

It was the largest Israeli military undertaking since the 1948 Arab–Israeli War, and Operation Egged later that year, a raid that destroyed an Egyptian military post in the Sinai. In December 1955, paratroopers augmented by Nahal and Givati Brigade infantry carried out Operation Olive Leaves, an attack on Syrian gun emplacements along the border which had been shelling Israel, destroying them. In 1956, a force of paratroopers carried out Operation Black Arrow, raiding an Egyptian military base in Gaza and ambushing an Egyptian military relief convoy.

=== Sinai Campaign (1956) ===
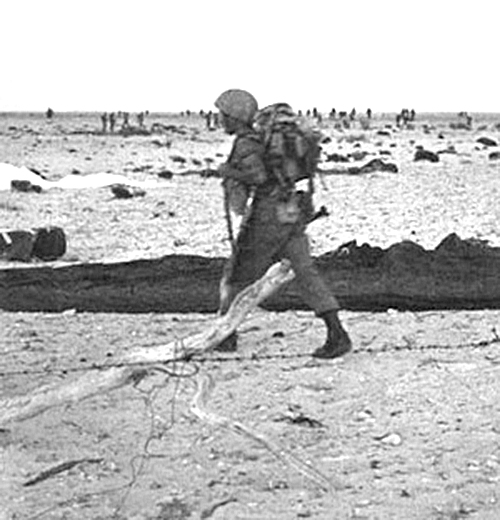
An Israeli paratrooper at the Mitla Pass during the Suez Crisis

The Suez Crisis began with a drop of an entire paratroop battalion over the eastern approaches to the Mitla Pass. The remaining members of the brigade force traveled along a 300 km route, 200 km deep within enemy territory, and linked up with the battalion. This break-through took 28 hours, during which the column swept through the deserted Kuntilla and fought two short but fierce battles against Egyptian forces in Thamad and Nakhl.

The major paratroop action during the campaign was the battle for Mitla Pass. A paratroop reconnaissance patrol entering the pass found itself trapped by an overwhelming enemy force. The Egyptians enjoyed the topographical advantage, fighting from positions and niches in superior terrain. Outnumbered reinforcements who entered the fray fought desperately to rescue their comrades. After nightfall, the Egyptians were routed, but at the cost of 38 paratroopers dead and over 100 more wounded. Enemy losses were estimated at 260.

The paratroopers jumped once again during the Sinai Campaign at At-Tur, on the south-eastern shore of the Gulf of Suez. The rest of the brigade proceeded by land to conquer Ras Sudar and link up with their comrades at At-Tur. They then moved southeastward to Sharm El Sheikh at the southern tip of the Sinai Peninsula, which they conquered in a classic pincer movement in coordination with the 9th brigade which had been moving southwestward. After the war's end, the paratroopers concentrated on reorganization and training with emphasis on helicopter operations.

At least 49 Egyptian POWs were executed by the Paratroopers Brigade. The officer Arye Biro ordered the executions, because "We had to move on to Ras Sudar".

=== Six-Day War (1967) ===
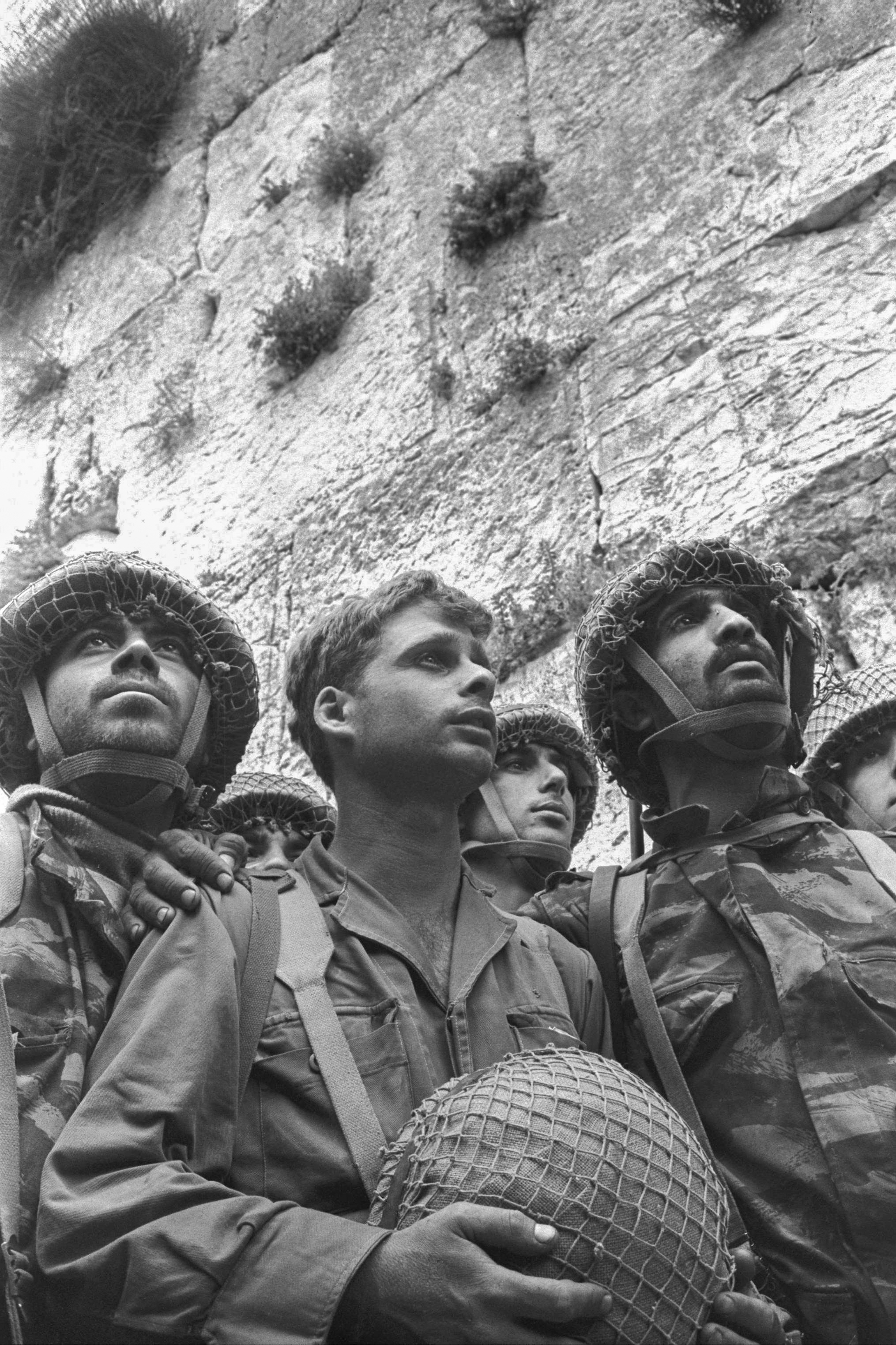
Israeli paratroopers reach the Western Wall on 7 June 1967

During the Six-Day War, the paratroopers, whose ORBAT had now greatly increased in number, fought on all fronts: the Sinai Peninsula, Judea, Samaria and the Golan Heights. Paratroopers and armor broke through the Rafah positions heavily defended by the Egyptian 7th Division from behind, with the unit suffering heavy losses. Many troops were further killed in action during the evacuation of the wounded. The following day, the unit entered Gaza. Paratroop forces under the command of Danny Matt, who later attained the rank of Major General, made a helicopter landing at the Um Katef artillery positions in the enemy's rear line.

A battalion raced against the 7th IDF Armored Division for the honor of being the first to reach the Suez Canal. Veteran paratrooper Aharon Davidi arrived first at the banks of the Suez. During the Six-Day War, paratroopers reached Sharm El Sheikh and likewise participated in the attack on the Golan. During the recapture of East Jerusalem from Jordanian annexation, considerable care was taken to protect and avoid damaging the holy places of the three religions. For this, the Paratroopers paid a heavy price in dead and wounded.

Sayeret Tzanhanim reconnaissance paratroopers equipped with Jeeps mounting 106mm recoilless rifles waged a campaign of destruction against Egyptian armor formations. During the Battle of Firdan Bridge the paratroopers destroyed dozens of T-55 tanks right off the freighter in Alexandria harbor.

=== War of Attrition (1968–1973) ===
After the Six-Day War, paratroopers participated in pursuit and retaliation operations against Egyptian infiltrators and became embroiled in the War of Attrition on various fronts. On March 21, 1968, paratroopers and armor raided a headquarters in Karame, Jordan, killing 250 Jordanian soldiers. On December 12, 1968, a heliborne paratroop force raided Beirut Airport and destroyed Lebanese aircraft. The raid came in response to repeated terrorist attacks against Israeli aircraft. On December 23, 1969, paratroopers participated in Operation Rooster 53, airlifting an entire Soviet radar station out of Egypt and transporting it back to Israel.

In January 1970, the brigade spearheaded Operation Rhodes, taking over the Egyptian island of Shadwan. Three Israeli soldiers were killed in the raid which saw the paratroopers remain on the island for 36 hours before departing with 62 Egyptian POWs and a captured Decca radar set.

On 12 May 1972, a hijacked Sabena airliner landed at Israel's Lod Airport (now Ben Gurion), after which paratroopers disguised as El-Al flight technicians assaulted the aircraft and rescued the passengers.

On the night of April 9, 1973, during Operation Spring of Youth, a select force of paratroopers headed by Chief of Staff Lt. Gen. Amnon Lipkin-Shahak landed in different sites in and around Beirut, where according to published foreign reports, they linked up with waiting cars hired by Mossad agents. According to these sources, the soldiers drove through Beirut without arousing suspicion.

They simultaneously attacked the Popular Front for the Liberation of Palestine's headquarters and the residences of three high-ranking Palestine Liberation Organization (PLO) leaders responsible for the Fatah–Black September Munich massacre of Israeli athletes in 1972. Surprise was total, and despite fierce resistance in the headquarters, all teams succeeded in carrying out their missions and were extracted by Israeli Air Force helicopters. Two Israeli soldiers and dozens of PFLP fighters were killed during the fighting.

=== Yom Kippur War (1973) ===
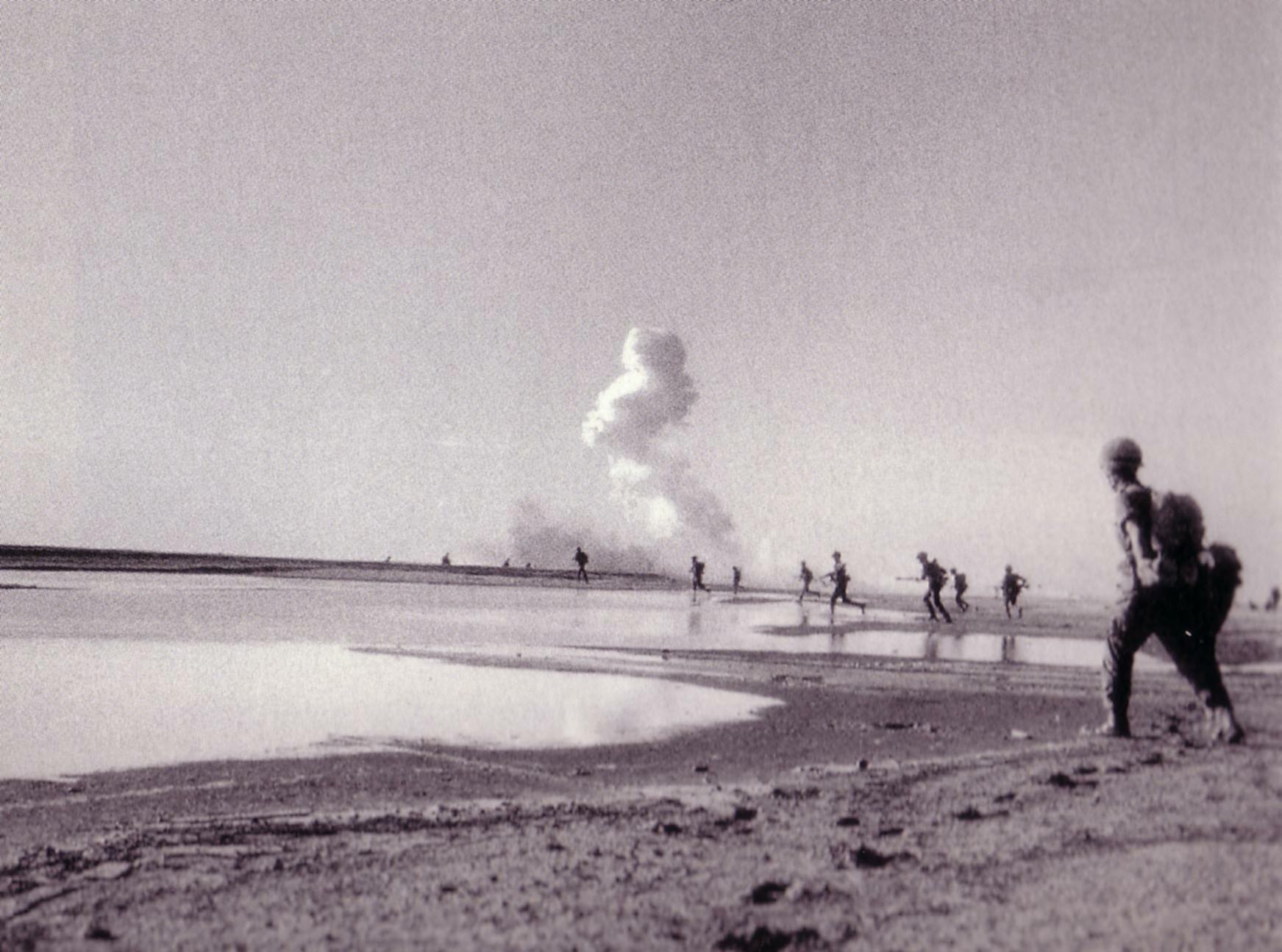
Israeli paratroopers advance in the Sinai during the Yom Kippur War

The Yom Kippur War saw the paratroopers fighting in some of the most difficult battles of the war. In the Sinai, paratroopers assigned to armored units rescued the beleaguered 'Budapest' outpost and destroyed the Egyptian forces. Paratroopers armed with LAW missiles helped contain an Egyptian armored thrust. Paratroopers of Danny Matt's brigade crossed the canal, as the spearhead of General Sharon's divisions, and established a bridgehead. Others, attempting to break open a route for them, ran up against the massive "Chinese Farm" fortifications.

For three days, paratroopers and armored corps of General Sharon's and General Adan's divisions made repeated attempts until they succeeded in breaking through and rescuing their comrades. During the bitter fighting, IDF soldiers ran over open ground to evacuate fallen comrades, and often fell victim to enemy fire in the process. The battles for the "Chinese Farm" prevented the Egyptians from closing in on the bridgehead and eventually succeeded in opening an access point to it.

On the West Bank of the Suez Canal, paratroopers fought in the city of Suez and advanced upon the city of Ismailia. On the Syrian front, paratroopers captured the peaks of Mt. Hermon in a heliborne operation. Other troops conquered Quneitra in the Golan Heights and Tel Shams and acted as armored infantry in the thrust into Syrian territory. After the Yom Kippur War the paratroopers and other infantry units were placed under the command of a chief Paratroop and Infantry Officer.

During an operation known as Operation Nightgown Sayeret Tzanhanim paratroopers were dropped off at a grassy opening near Kasr al-Hayr on the main Baghdad-Damascus Highway. They headed for a bridge where a brigade of Iraqi T-62 tanks was about to cross en route to the Golan Heights battlefield. The paratroopers attacked the Iraqi armor from the front causing a bottleneck. The Sayeret Tzanhanim paratroopers also attacked the trapped brigade from the rear with machine gun fire and RPGs destroying the brigade.

The paratroopers then placed explosive charges underneath the bridge full of destroyed Iraqi tanks destroying the bridge. This prevented crucial Iraqi reinforcements from ever reaching the Golan Heights front destroying an Iraqi tank brigade in the process. Operation Nightgown was one of the smallest Israeli special operations ever mounted and also one of the most important. Approximately a dozen paratroopers destroyed the Iraqi tank brigade.

=== Operation Entebbe (1976) ===
On the morning of July 4, 1976, a counter-terrorist hostage-rescue mission headed by Brig. Gen. Dan Shomron succeeded in rescuing 102 passengers and crew of a hijacked Air France aircraft at Entebbe, Uganda. The Paratroopers force, led by Col. Matan Vilnai, was tasked with securing the civilian airport field, clearing and securing the runways, protection and fuelling of the Israeli aircraft. The commandos, transported in four Lockheed C-130 Hercules transport planes, succeeded in landing undetected at Entebbe's airport and taking the hijackers and their Ugandan collaborators by surprise. All seven hijackers and dozens of Ugandan soldiers were killed during the mission.

After the raid, the assault team returned to their aircraft and began loading the hostages where they were shot at by Ugandan soldiers. Israeli forces returned fire with their AK-47s, inflicting casualties on the Ugandans. During this brief but intense firefight, Lt. Col. Yonatan "Yoni" Netanyahu, the older brother of Israeli Prime Minister Benjamin Netanyahu, was shot in the chest and killed during the firefight. He was the only Israeli commando killed in the operation. Three hostages were killed, one was left in Uganda, and approximately 10 were wounded. The 102 rescued hostages were flown to Israel via Nairobi, Kenya, shortly after the raid.

=== Operation Litani (1978) ===
Paratroopers participated in the 1978 invasion of Lebanon, carried out after the infamous Coastal Road massacre, which temporarily purged Southern Lebanon of PLO terrorists. After the IDF withdrawal and the return of sporadic attacks, the Paratroopers participated in preventive raids against bases in Lebanon, raids designed to keep the terrorists off balance and "on the run", thereby preventing them from carrying out their operations within Israel.

=== 1982 Lebanon War (1982–1985) ===
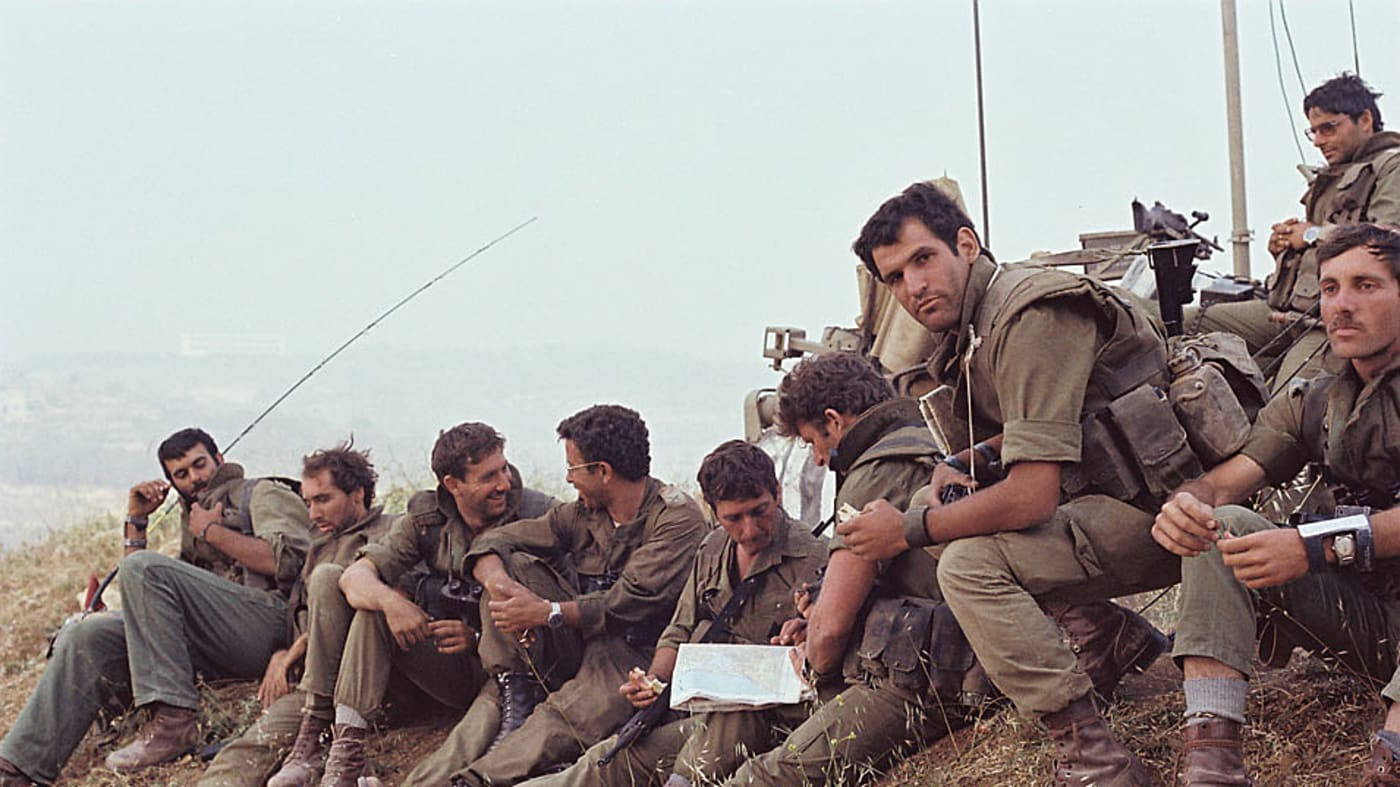
Paratroopers take a break during the Lebanon War in 1982

The paratroopers were an important component of the 1982 Lebanon War. The war in Lebanon proved the IDF's fighting ability and tested Paratroop combat doctrine, which had been revised as a result of the lessons of the Yom Kippur War, Operation Litani and other operations. Paratroopers fought in every sector of the war against Syrian troops and paratroops, both in built-up and mountainous areas. They operated efficiently and in full coordination with other corps, the Navy and the Air Force.

One of the better known operations was the amphibious landing at the mouth of the Awali River, north of Sidon, from where the paratroopers advanced to the outskirts of Beirut through the mountains. In their advance, they engaged Syrian commando forces.

=== Second Intifada ===
The paratroopers played a key role in the Second Intifada. Paratroopers participated in Operation Defensive Shield, taking part in the Battle of Jenin and Battle of Nablus.

=== 2008–2009 Gaza War ===
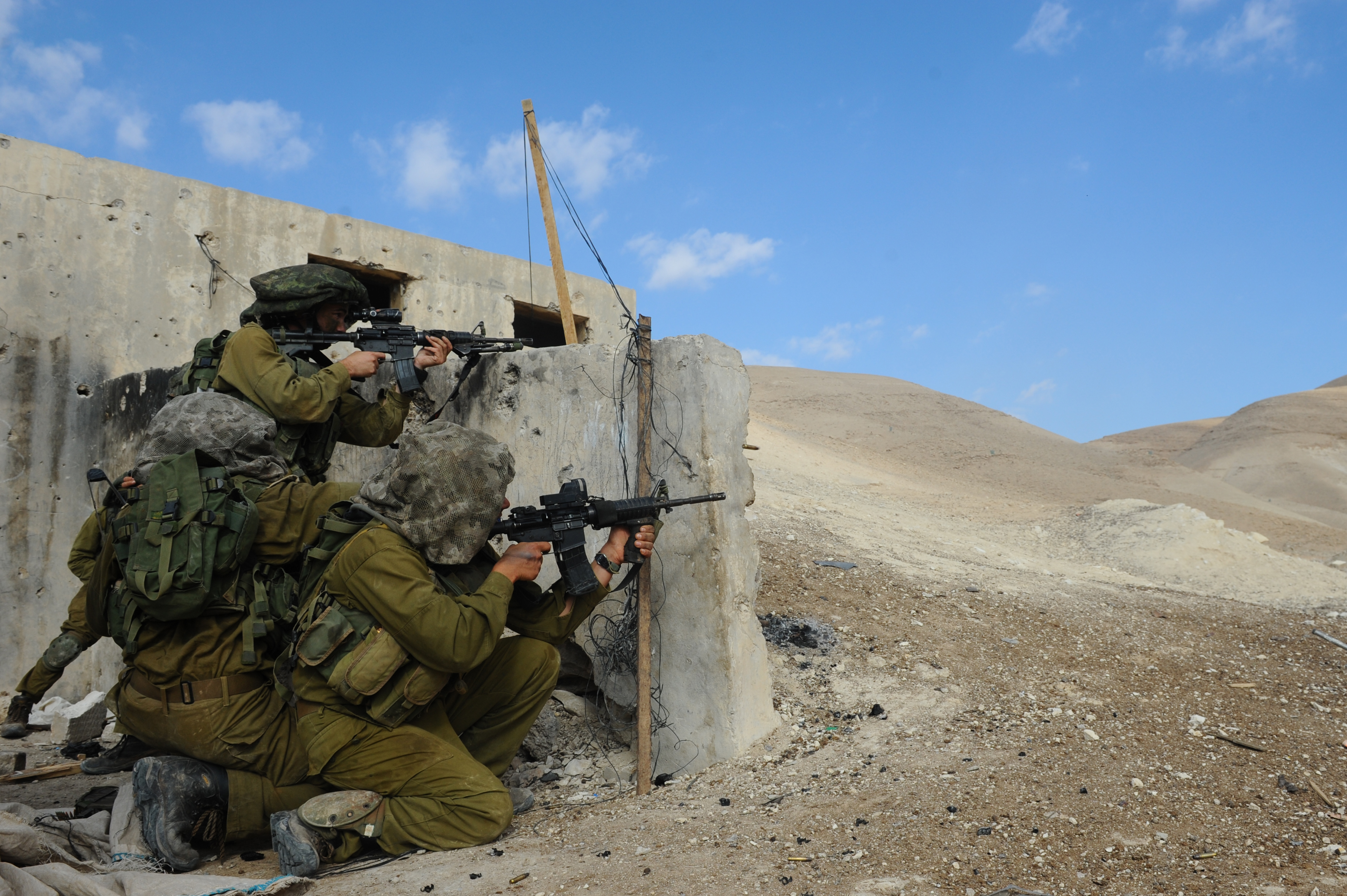
Paratroopers' reconnaissance in training

Paratroopers took part in ground operations in the 2008–2009 Gaza War. The brigade was an important component during the war.

=== 2006 Lebanon War ===
The brigade participated in the 2006 Lebanon War. The paratroopers took part in key engagements. Paratrooper units took part in the Battle of Maroun al-Ras, the first serious battle of the war, which ended in the IDF capturing most of the town. The paratroopers also participated in the Battle of Bint Jbeil, the Battle of Ayta ash-Shab, and Operation Change of Direction 11.

=== 2014 Gaza War ===
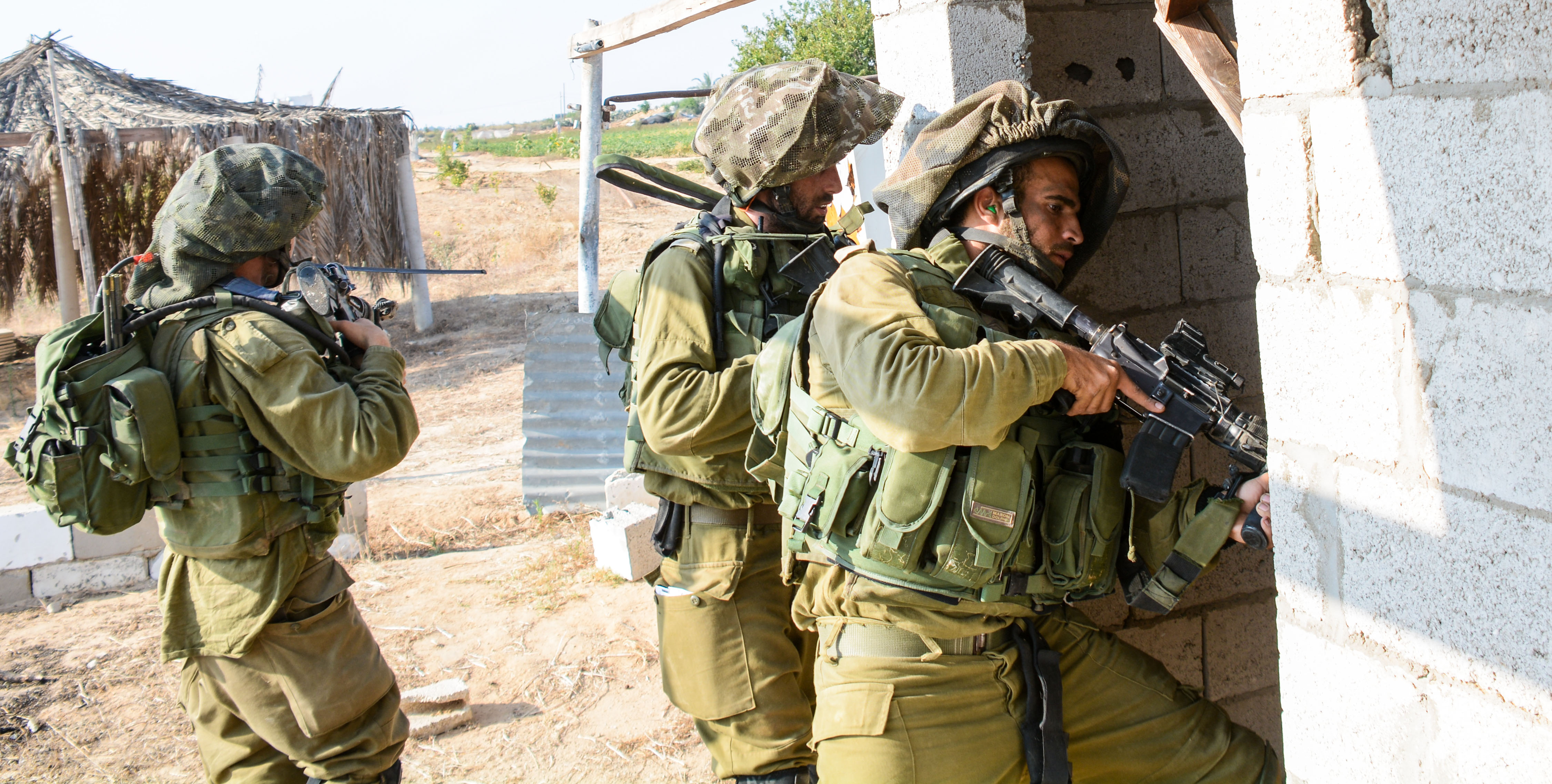
Paratroopers in Gaza during the 2014 Gaza War

During the 2014 Gaza War, the Paratroopers Brigade participated in ground operations, particularly in the Khan Yunis area. The brigade was credited with killing 141 Hamas militants and locating four tunnels during the war. Eight paratroopers were killed in the war, including one in a grenade explosion outside of combat.

== Organization and insignia ==
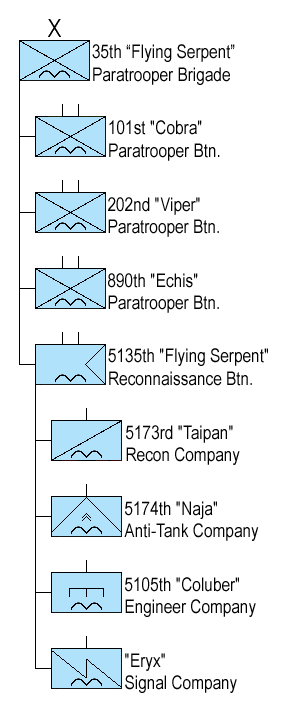
Brigade structure

The 35th Paratrooper Brigade is part of the IDF's 98th Division, also known as the "Fire Formation". It consists of three regular battalions, each bearing the name of a venomous snake. The 101st, bearing the number of disbanded Unit 101, is the Brigade's first battalion. The 202nd is the Brigade's second battalion and was numbered to keep it in line with the 101st. The 890th, although the brigade's 3rd battalion, was in fact the IDF's first paratrooper battalion. The brigade operates a sayeret battalion combining the three specialized units of the brigade.

Soldiers of the Paratroopers Brigade are distinguished by their red beret, paratrooper wings, reddish-brown leather boots and the paratroopers tunic (Yerkit), which is slightly different in an appearance from the regular infantry outfits.

=== Units ===
- 35th Paratroopers Brigade "Shfifon/Flying Serpent"
  - 101st Paratroopers Battalion "Fatan/Cobra"
  - 202nd Paratroopers Battalion "Tzapa/Viper"
  - 890th Paratroopers Battalion "Efea/Echis"
  - 5135th Reconnaissance Battalion "Shfifon"
  - Logistic Battalion
  - Signal Company

=== Weapons and gear ===
The Paratroopers Brigade uses the M4 carbine.

== Memorials ==
The main memorial is situated between Gedera and Rehovot 1.5 kilometers west of Tel Nof Airbase on National Road. The Black Arrow Memorial for special operations of the paratroopers is located near kibbutz Mefalsim. Near moshav Shtula the Givat Harabatim commemorates fallen soldiers of the 1982 Lebanon War.

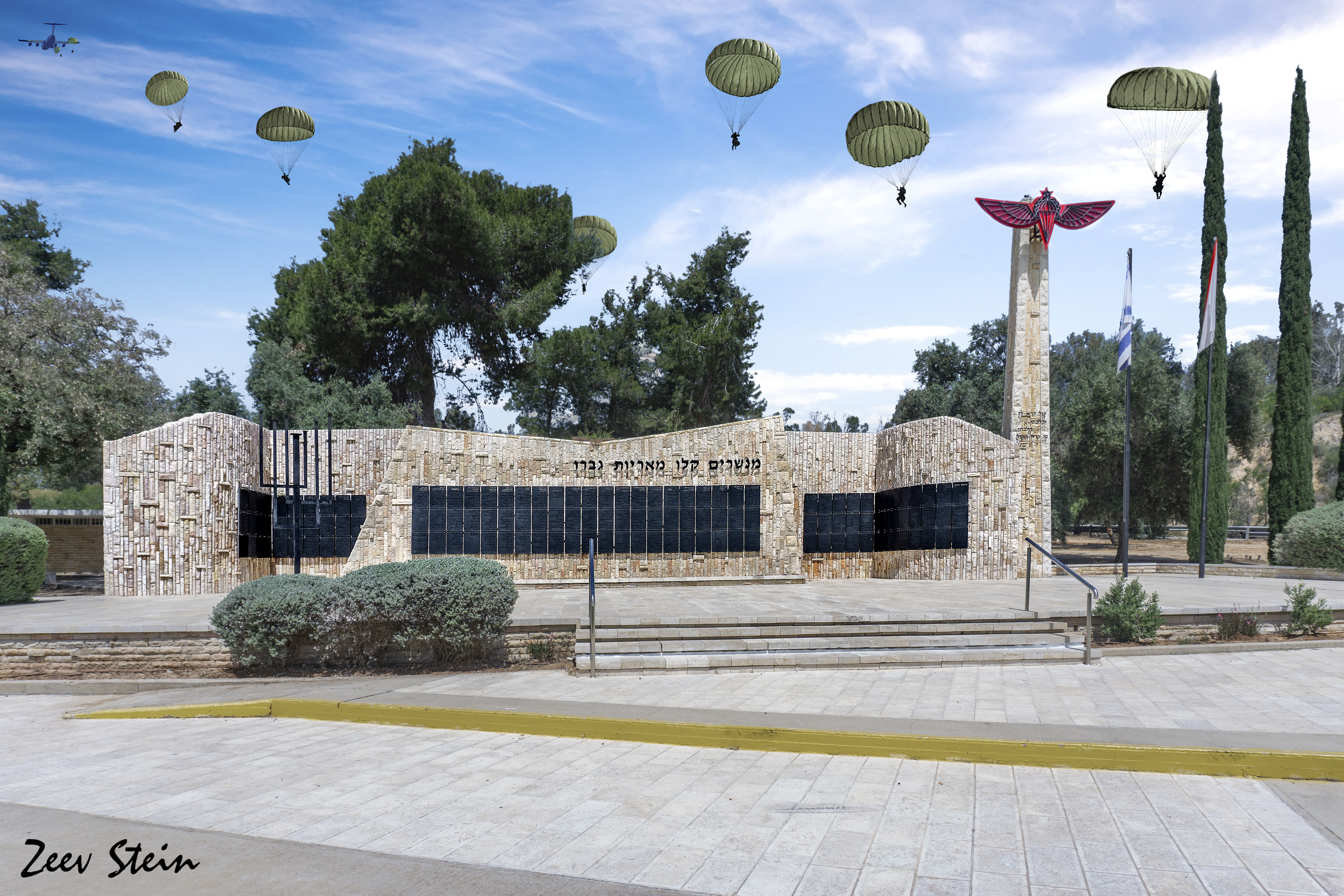
Paratroopers' main memorial near Gedera in 2015

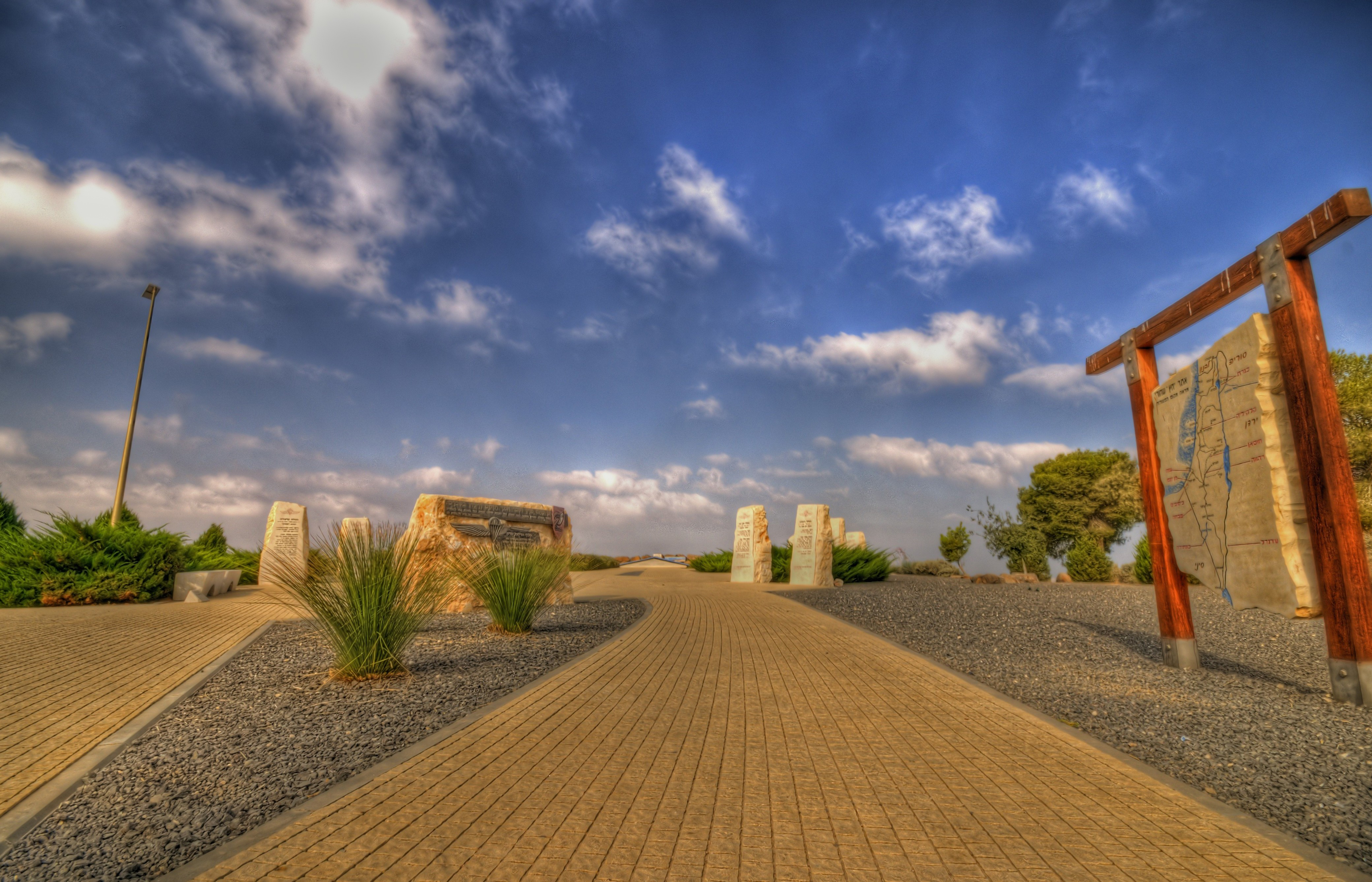
The Black Arrow Memorial near Mefalsim in 2011

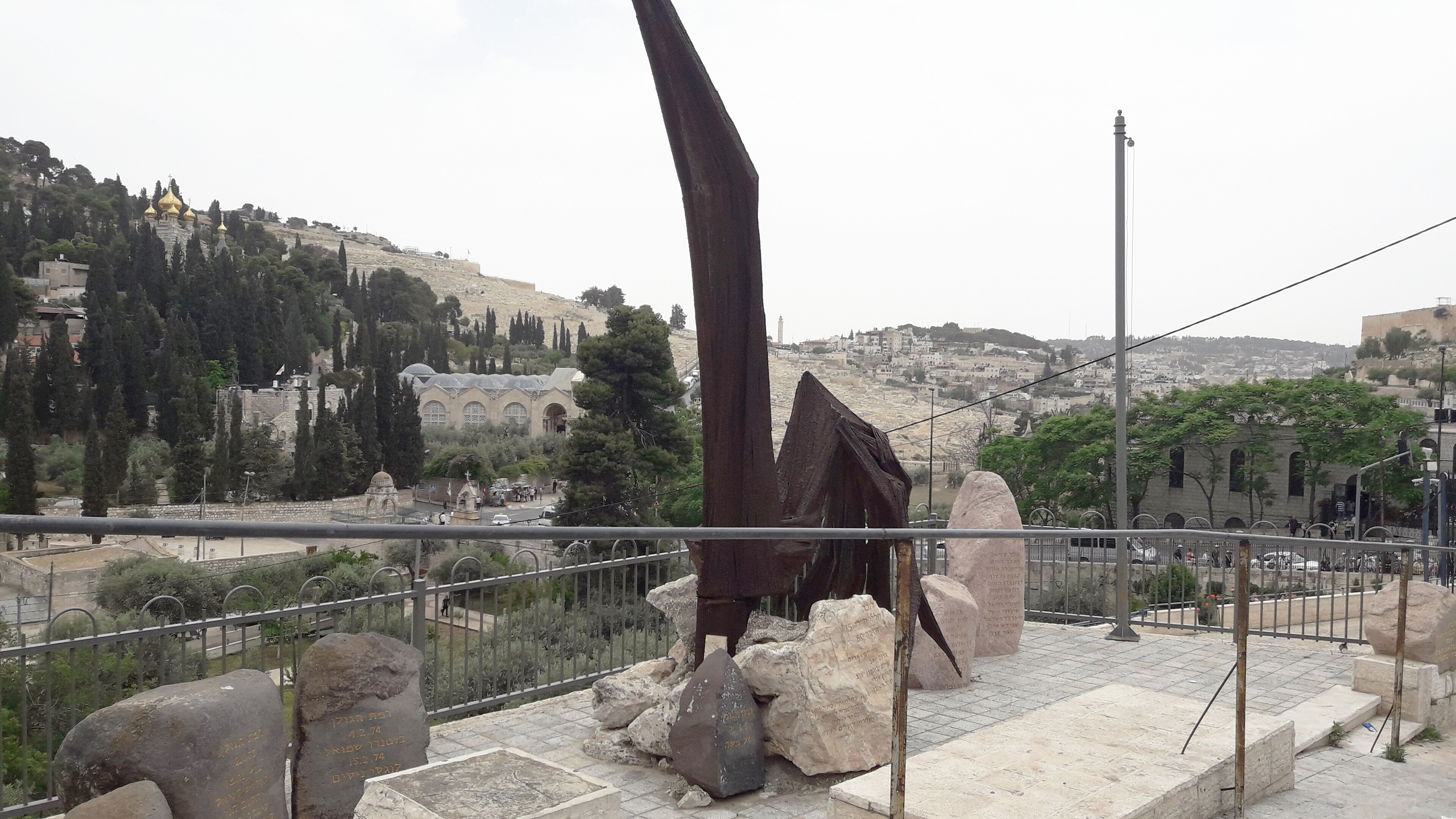
Paratroopers' memorial in Jerusalem near the Lions' Gate in 2018

== See also ==
- Duvdevan Unit
- IDF Code of Ethics
- Maglan
