= March 1955 Outburst in the Gaza Strip =

1955 unrest in the Gaza Strip

The March 1955 Outburst in the Gaza Strip was a wave of significant unrest in the Egyptian-occupied Gaza Strip over proposed plans by Egyptian government to relocate several thousand Palestinian refugee families into the Sinai Peninsula.

== Background ==
Following the 1948 Arab–Israeli War, the Gaza Strip was occupied by Egypt.

== Outburst ==
On 23 February 1955, three Egyptian intelligence agents infiltrated Israel from the Egyptian-occupied Gaza Strip. During their infiltration, they murdered an Israeli civilian. As a result, the Israeli military launched Operation Black Arrow on 28 February, with a unit commanded by Ariel Sharon attacking an Egyptian military outpost in Gaza, resulting in the deaths of eight Israeli soldiers and thirty-six Egyptian soldiers.

Operation Black Arrow coincided with growing discontent inside Gaza over Egyptian government plans that had first been published in 1953 to relocate thousands of Palestinian refugee families from the Gaza Strip into the Sinai Peninsula. A demonstration held by Palestinians on 1 March in Gaza City against the Egyptian government soon turned violent, with Egyptian troops opening fire on the demonstrators, killing one. Over the following days, mass demonstrations and rioting would break out across Gaza, led particularly by Palestinian communists and members of the Muslim Brotherhood. Some of the rioting included attacks against United Nations personnel in Gaza.

The Egyptian government would regain control over Gaza by the end of 9 March, effectivly suppressing the unrest by carrying out extensive mass arrests of communists and Muslim Brotherhood members. The government also forcibly dissolved Gazan unions that had participated in the protests. According to Jean-Pierre Filiu, the force of the Egyptian crackdown "convinced both the communists and the Islamists to refrain from pressing their advantage," leading to an outcome where "the enthusiasm generated by the ‘March uprising’, which was designated by the Arabic expression ‘intifada’, was of short duration."

== Aftermath ==
Nasser would make his first official visit to the Gaza Strip on 29 March 1955.

Following the outburst of Palestinian unrest, the Egyptian government abandoned any proposals to resettle Palestinian refugees and, also due to the Israeli military operation, began directly sponsoring Palestinian fedayeen militants in Gaza.
