= Operation Black Arrow =

1955 Israeli military operation

- Part of the reprisal operations (during the Palestinian Fedayeen insurgency)
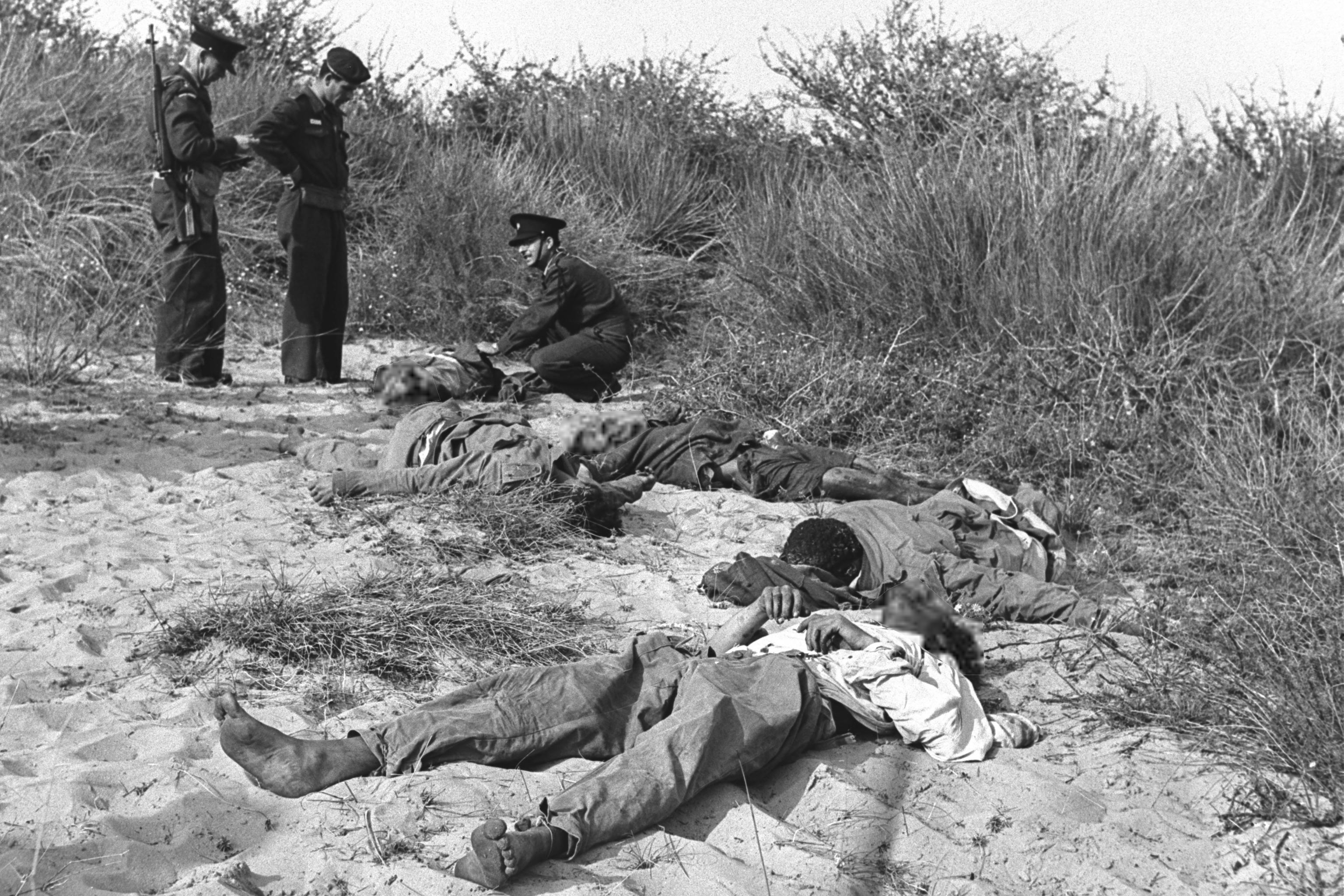
- Five fedayeen killed by Israeli border police in chase after attack near Nir Galim.
Date	28 February – 1 March 1955 (two days)
Location	Egyptian-occupied Gaza Strip 31°30′48″N 34°28′49″E
Result	Israeli victory

Belligerents
Israel	Egypt

Commanders and leaders
(Israel) Ariel Sharon (Israel) Danny Matt (Israel) Aharon Davidi	

Units involved
Paratroopers Brigade	

Casualties and losses
8 killed and 13 wounded	37–38 killed and 31 wounded

Operation Black Arrow (Hebrew: מבצע חץ שחור, romanized: Mivtza Ḥetz Shaḥor) was an Israeli military operation carried out in Gaza (while under Egyptian control) on 28 February 1955. The operation targeted the Egyptian Army. Thirty-eight Egyptian soldiers were killed during the operation as were eight Israelis.

Israel's actions were unanimously condemned by United Nations Security Council Resolution 106.

== Background ==
The 1948 Arab–Israeli War resulted in a decisive Israeli victory. However, the Arab nations remained intransigent and were only willing to sign armistice agreements with Israel. Thus, a static situation of “no war, no peace,” emerged. Moreover, hundreds of thousands of Arab refugees now camped alongside Israel's porous borders. The refugees lived in squalor and were kept under martial law. Arab governments, but in particular Egypt, sensing the refugees’ discontent, capitalized on the opportunity to recruit embittered Palestinians for armed actions against Israel. At first, the infiltrations and border transgressions took the form of petty banditry and thievery.

However, with the rise of Gamal Abdel Nasser in 1954, tensions spiked. Israel engaged in covert terrorist operations as part of Operation Susannah, most notably the failed Lavon Affair, with a view to creating instability and disruption so as to allow the UK to justify stopping its military withdrawal from Suez - while the Egyptian military intelligence was taking an active role in providing various forms of support for Palestinian fedayeen activity.

In the months leading up to the 28 February 1955 incident, tensions along the Egyptian-Israeli Armistice Demarcation Line near the Gaza Strip were high, marked by repeated low-level infiltrations, retaliations, and mutual accusations of ceasefire violations. The region experienced relative calm from November 1954 to early 1955, but both parties lodged numerous complaints, with Israel citing 80 cases of infiltration and Egypt condemning incursions and aggressive patrol behavior. Several emergency meetings of the Egypt-Israel Mixed Armistice Commission (MAC) were called to address more serious violations, such as cross-border raids, sabotage, and exchanges of fire. The United Nations Truce Supervision Organization report on the incident notes provocations from both sides, including Israeli patrols mocking Egyptian soldiers and Egyptian infiltrators accused of espionage and sabotage. UN officials attempted to mediate, proposing joint patrols and local security arrangements, but agreement was limited. This deteriorating situation set the stage for the most serious clash since the 1949 Armistice. After a trio of Arabs working the Egyptian military stole military documents and murdered a civilian, Israel decided to take decisive action against Egypt for its sponsorship of the Palestinians and initiated Operation Black Arrow.

== Casus belli ==
Initially, Israel informed the Mixed Armistice Commissions that "an Israeli patrol was ambushed inside Israeli-controlled territory by an Egyptian armed force". They suggested that Egypt initiated the aggression in Egypt and that Israel pursued them into Gaza. The Israeli spokesperson told the media "Israeli troops suffered a number of casualties in fierce fighting with an Egyptian attacking force near Gaza.. [Egyptian Army] was beaten off and the Israeli unit returned to its base".

However, it later indicated that the actual case was retaliation for Egyptian infiltration. On February 23rd 1955, three Arab infiltrators broke into an Israel Government building near Rishon Le Zion and stole official documents, and the same group murdered an Israeli civilian who was cycling in the town of Rehovot on February 25th. One of the infiltrators who was pursued and killed by Israeli forces was found to be in possession of documents stolen from Rishon Lezion and reports on movement of vehicles in the south of Israel, linking him to Egyptian military intelligence. Defense Minister David Ben-Gurion and Chief of Staff Moshe Dayan demanded a harsh response directed against those believed to have sponsored the attack. Prime Minister Moshe Sharett was more hesitant but demurred.

== Attack ==
On February 28, Ariel Sharon, commander of the Paratroop Brigade was issued the go-ahead to initiate Operation Black Arrow. That night, a force of 150 paratroopers, led by Aharon Davidi and Danny Matt, attacked an Egyptian base near the city of Gaza.

The UN report S/3373 describes the attack as a coordinated assault by Israeli regular army forces into Egyptian-controlled territory near Gaza. Around 20:30 local time, two Israeli platoons crossed the Armistice Demarcation Line, advanced over three kilometers into Gaza, and launched a multi-pronged offensive. The targets included an Egyptian military camp, the Gaza railway station master’s house, and a water-pump facility vital to local infrastructure. The Israeli forces used mortars, anti-tank weapons, hand grenades, bangalore torpedoes, and explosives, destroying buildings and causing fires. A separate Israeli unit ambushed an Egyptian military truck carrying reinforcements, resulting in heavy casualties.

The attack lasted about three hours. According to the Egyptian-Israeli Mixed Armistice Commission, 36 Egyptian soldiers and 2 civilians were killed, with 29 soldiers and 2 civilians wounded, while 8 Israelis were killed.

== Aftermath ==
Benny Morris suggests that in Egypt there was a sense of humiliation. Not since the Arab–Israeli war of 1948 had the Egyptians suffered such a blow. The extent of Egyptian losses was censored in Egypt in the immediate aftermath. Ralph Stevenson called personally to Mahmoud Fawzy urging Egypt to refrain from reprisal action.

Egypt issued a complaint to the United Nations, claiming a "violent and premeditated aggression" was launched against them while Israel launched a counter complaint again claiming that Israeli troops were responding to Egyptian aggression. Following a report to the United Nations Security Council by E. L. M. Burns, the Israeli attack was unanimously condemned in a resolution brought to the council jointly by the USA, France and the UK while Israel's counter complaint was dismissed - an unusual instance of agreement during the Cold War. British Diplomat, Pierson Dixon, dismissed Israel's counter-complaint, maintaining that Israel's assault was "obviously a premeditated attack". The lack of Egyptian reprisal action was praised by the UK and France at the debate on the resolution. At the UN, Dixon said he had expected to hear "some expression of regret for this armed attack" from Israel, "Nothing of the sort was offered us. Instead we are faced, without denial, by a complete disregard.. of the security councils call to Israel to take steps to prevent all retaliatory action in the future."

Blaming UN inaction for their plight, heavy protests by Palestinians led to the storming of a UN building in Gaza, the UN flag being torn down and the burning of a food storage barn. A dawn to dusk curfew was imposed for several days. Through Reuters, Israeli Foreign Minister, Moshe Sharett, warned Egypt that as long as it maintains an official status of not being at peace, "she must face the consequences, including armed clashes".

In Egypt, President Nasser decided to close the Gulf of Aqaba to Israeli shipping and air traffic in response. He also increased support for Palestinian fedayeen raids, which invited even harsher Israeli retaliatory raids such as Operation Elkayam (72 Egyptian KIA) and Operation Volcano (81 Egyptian KIA, 55 captured). Egypt then pivoted away from the USA and to the Soviet Union and signed the Egyptian–Czechoslovak arms deal beginning a significant change to Soviet foreign policy in the Middle East, setting a precedent for similar sales and direct deals with the governments of Syria (starting the 1950s), Iraq (following the abolition of the monarchy in 1958), Algeria (in the 1960s), Libya (post-1969), Sudan (after 1967), and North and South Yemen (in the 1970s and 1980s).

Tensions between Egypt and Israel ultimately led to Israel taking part in the invasion of the Sinai Peninsula and Suez Canal alongside the United Kingdom and France (who held different motivations for invading) in which the Egypt was invaded by three armies, defeated, Israel began its first occupation of Sinai, and the Fedayeen bases disbanded.

== Memorial ==
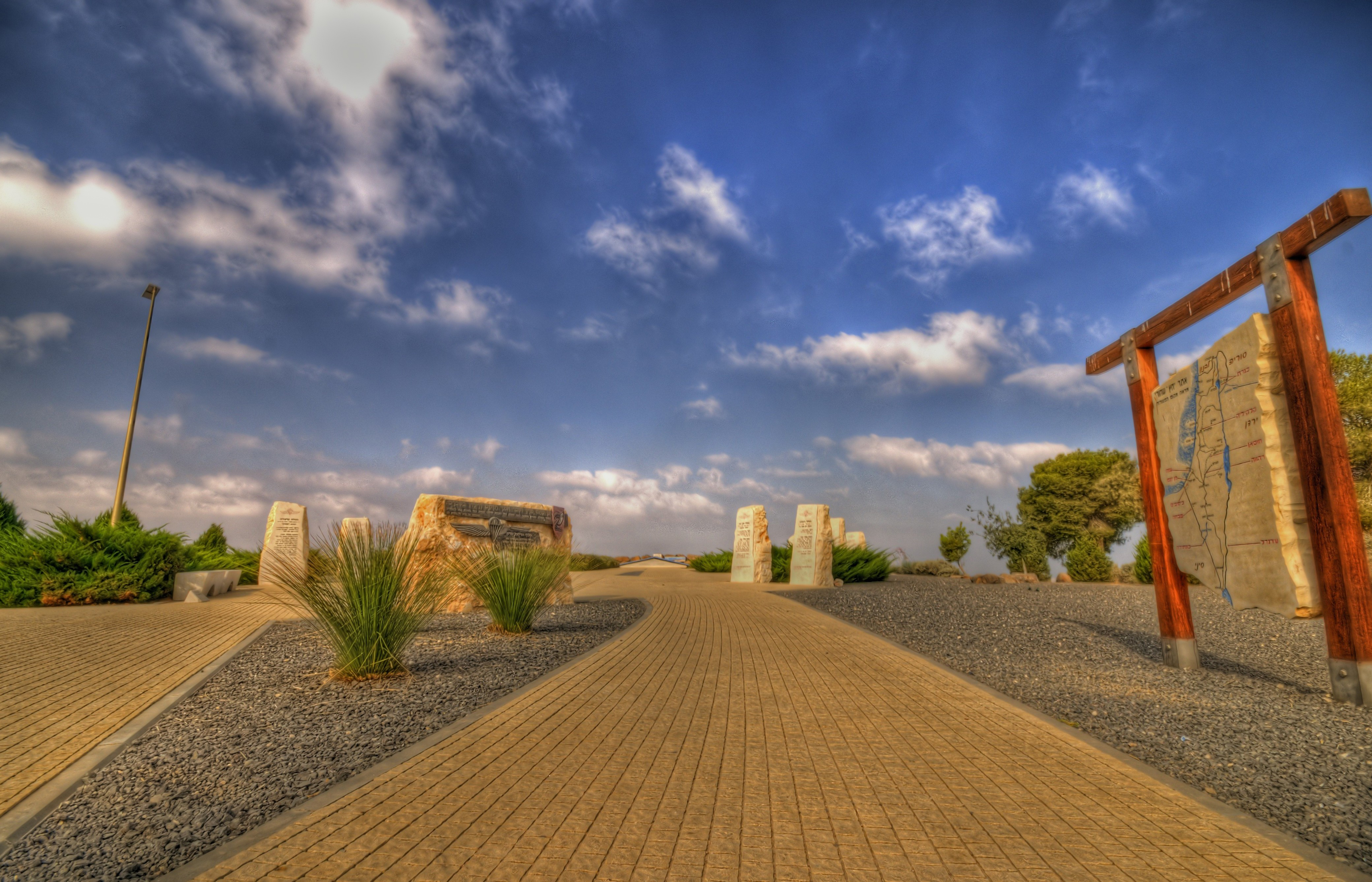
Black Arrow memorial

A memorial to this operation and other IDF paratrooper operations is situated between Kibbutz Mefalsim and the Gaza Strip.
