= Sar-El =

Israeli non-profit organization

- שר-אל
- Logo of Sar-El

Agency overview
- Formed: 1983; 43 years ago
- Headquarters: Tel Aviv, Israel
- Agency executive: Israel Geva, Executive General Manager
- Website: www.sar-el.org

Sar-El (Hebrew: שר-אל; lit. The National Project for Volunteers for Israel or Service for Israel) is a non-profit service organization, subordinate to and under the direction of the Israeli Logistics Corps.

== Eligibility ==
The program is open to both Israelis living abroad and non-Israeli citizens who wish to participate in a service program akin to national service without enlisting in the Israeli Defense Forces. The program usually consists of three weeks of volunteer service on different rear army or air force bases, doing non-combative work. The program also has one and two week service periods. In the case of non-Israelis, they must be aged 17 years or older (or 16 if accompanied by a parent), and in the case of Israeli citizens, they must be 30 years of age or older, and have for some reason or another not completed their national service requirement.

Volunteers are employed for a few weeks in the IDF workshops – usually related jobs in maintenance and Logistics. Many volunteers come from the US organized by a US-based non-profit organization Volunteers for Israel.

Sar-El accepts both Jewish and non-Jewish supporters of Israel from the age of 17 upwards.

== History ==
The association was founded in spring 1983 by Yehuda Meir Indor and Cantors. Aharon Davidi, an Israeli general, was invited to be the first director of the organisation. Most of the volunteers arrived in Israel as part of the organization from the United States and from France.

In 1988, the association was awarded the Speaker's Prize.

Sar-El had 881 volunteers from the United States in 2015, although volunteers have come from over 60 countries.

Notable volunteers have included American politicians Rahm Emanuel, who volunteered during the Gulf War, and Brian Mast.
