= Volunteers for Israel =

Volunteers for Israel (VFI) is an American non-profit 501(c)3 organization that volunteers to do civilian work in Israel, open to both Jews and non-Jews. It is most famous for doing civilian work on Israel Defense Forces bases in partnership with Sar-El. The organization began in 1982, during the 1982 Lebanon War. Today, VFI has evolved from its initial focus on aiding the military to providing what it calls ‘Volun-Touring’ opportunities. These opportunities encompass a wide range of Israel’s broad history and culture. Volunteers now help in hospitals, assist on farms, participate in archaeological digs, support the IDF, and engage in various other community-oriented projects as well as touring the country and getting familiar with Israeli culture and history.

Presently VFI's eight Volun-Tour programs in Israel are: VFI Mission: Feed the Soldiers; VFI Rehab Program; VFI Archaeology Program; VFI Archaeology and Feed the Soldiers Program, VFI Farm Program; VFI Volun-Tour Odyssey Program; VFI Holyland Volun-Tour Program, and VFI Private Group Volun-Touring. See vfi-usa.org
