= United Nations Security Council Resolution 106 =

UN Security Council Resolution 106
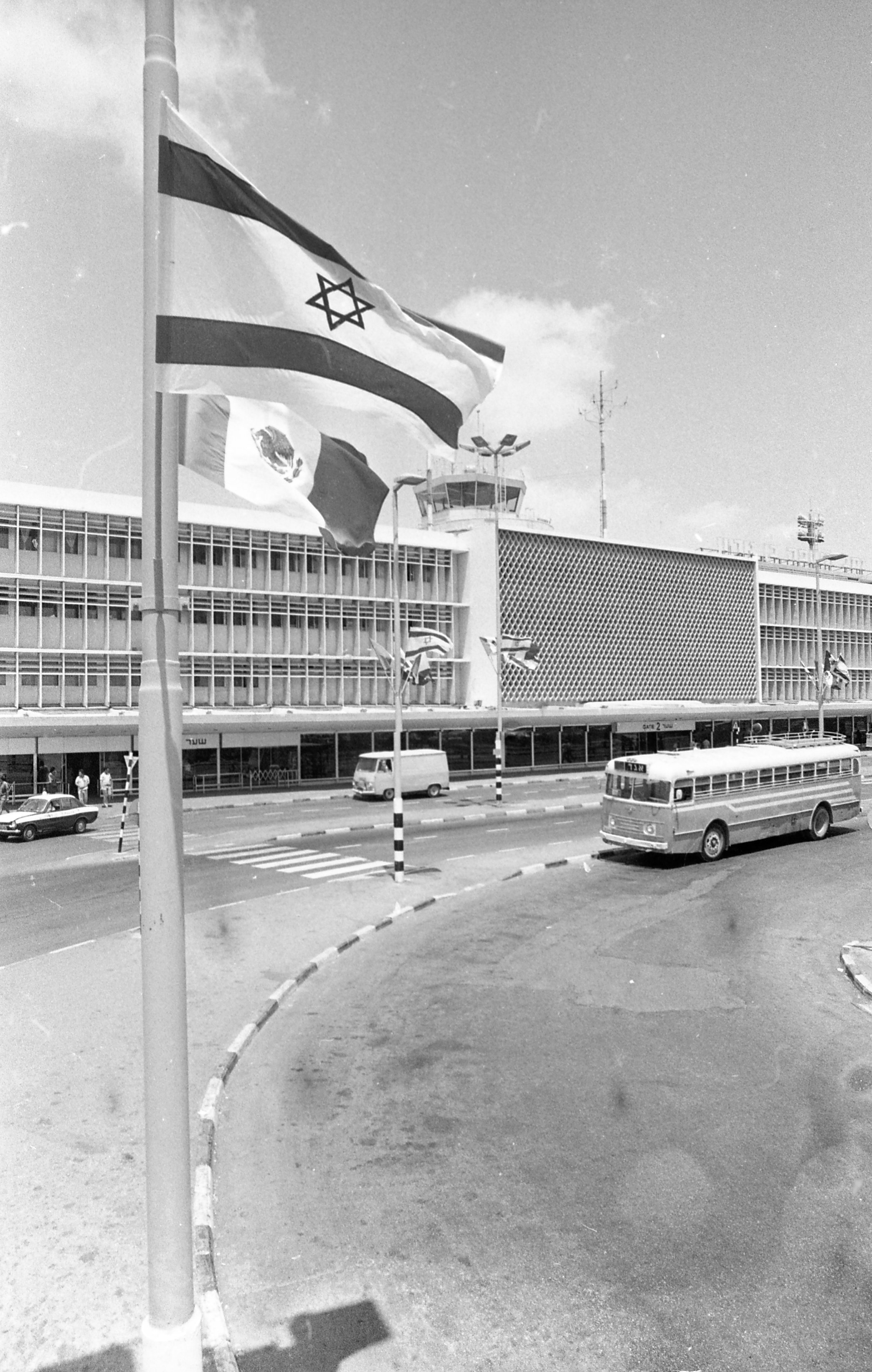
- Israel flag
- Date: March 29 1955
- Meeting no.: 695
- Code: S/3378 (Document)
- Subject: The Palestine Question
- Voting summary: 11 voted for; None voted against; None abstained
- Result: Adopted

Security Council composition
- Permanent members: China; France; Soviet Union; United Kingdom; United States
- Non-permanent members: Belgium; Brazil; Iran; New Zealand; Peru; Turkey

United Nations Security Council Resolution 106 was adopted unanimously on March 29, 1955, after hearing reports from the Chief of Staff of the United Nations Truce Supervision Organization in Palestine and representatives of Egypt and Israel. The Council noted that the Egyptian-Israel Mixed Armistice Commission determined that a "prearranged and planned attack ordered by Israel authorities" was committed by regular Israeli forces against elements of the Egyptian Army in the Gaza Strip on February 28, 1955. The Council condemned this attack as a violation of United Nations Security Council Resolution 54, called upon Israel to take all necessary measures to prevent such action, expressed its conviction that the maintenance of the General Armistice Agreement was threatened by deliberate violations and that no progress towards the return of permanent peace in Palestine would be made unless the parties complied strictly with their obligations.

== See also ==
- List of United Nations Security Council Resolutions 101 to 200 (1953–1965)
- United Nations Security Council Resolution 107
