= Tom Derek Bowden =

British army officer (died 2019)

- Born: 17 December 1921; Surrey, England, United Kingdom
- Died: 10 June 2019 (aged 97); England, United Kingdom
- Military career
- Allegiance: United Kingdom
- Branch: British Army
- Units: Royal Scots Greys; Parachute Regiment; Special Air Service
- Conflicts: Arab revolt in Palestine; Second World War; 1948 Arab–Israeli War

Tom Derek Bowden (1921–2019) was a British army officer noted for his role in 1948 Arab–Israeli War and helping create the Israeli Paratroopers Brigade.

== Early life and military career ==
Bowden was born in Surrey, the son of a well-to-do South London family. He married Eva Heilbronner with whom he had four children.

== Military career ==
Bowden enlisted the British cavalry in 1938 at age 17, and serving in Mandatory Palestine with the Royal Scots Greys during the Arab revolt in Palestine. He served under Orde Wingate.

In 1941, Bowden, now an officer, led a British cavalry charge into battle on horseback against Vichy forces in Vichy-held Syria-Lebanon. Bowden was badly wounded in the leg.

After six months recovery at the home of the Appel family in Tel Aviv, Bowden volunteered for the Parachute Regiment (United Kingdom). He trained in Egypt, and fought in Sicily, Italy and on D-Day with the Special Air Service, and parachuted into the Battle of Arnhem, where he was taken prisoner. When his German captors discovered letters from his Israeli girlfriend, kibbutznik, Hannah Appel, in his gear, the officer who examined his papers said to him, "Now you will see how we treat the Jews,'" and sent him to the Bergen-Belsen concentration camp where he was made to work carting Jewish corpses to disposal pits. After a month at Bergen-Belsen, Bowden was sent to a POW camp near Hamburg where he remained until liberation.

After the war, Bowden went to Yugoslavia, then ruled by Marshal Tito, to work as a parachute instructor. "But the Israeli thing was starting up and I thought to myself, I'd better get there - we don't want another Belsen."

Bowden entered British Mandatory Palestine clandestinely, through Cyprus, joining the Haganah under a pseudonym, Captain David Appel, although he spoke no Hebrew. He served at the Battle of Latrun, fighting alongside Holocaust survivors to keep the road between Jerusalem and the coast open. He later told an interviewer for The Guardian, "We were up against the British army-trained Trans-Jordan Frontier Force and had no water or supplies. I was in command of a lot of Polish chaps who only spoke Yiddish, so I had to learn a few words to order them to fire at the enemy." After the accidental shooting of Mickey Marcus, an American volunteer fighting for Israel who was mistaken for an Arab when he stepped from his field tent and did not realise that he was being asked in Hebrew for a password, the English-speaking 7th volunteer Brigade was formed. Bowden led a unit that fought in the Galilee.

In 1998, Bowden told an interviewer that he, like everyone else, knew that Arab armies would attack the Jews as soon as the British withdrew, "I was going to make sure they didn't get stamped on. (The Arabs) were going to kill the whole sodding lot of them! I'd seen enough annihilation."

In 1949, Chaim Laskov asked Captain Bowden to create a paratroop school, and to establish the predecessor of the Paratroopers Brigade. He did so, writing a training manual with the help of his Hebrew-speaking secretary Eva Heilbronner and training soldiers with British Army surplus equipment.
