= Aharon Davidi =

Israeli general and founder of Sar-El volunteer organization

- אַהֲרוֹן דָּוִידִי
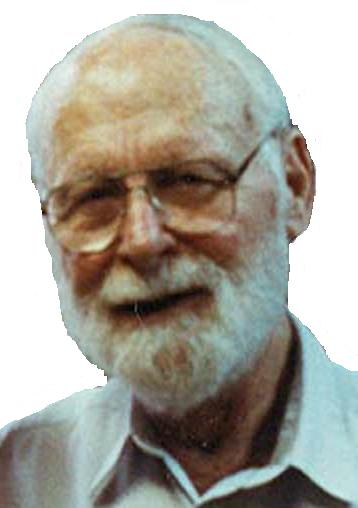
- Aharon Davidi
- Born: 1927
- Died: February 11, 2012 (aged 84–85); Israel
- Burial place: Israel
- Military career
- Allegiance: Israel
- Branch: Army
- Service years: 1953-1970
- Rank: Brigadier
- Nickname: Davidi
- Commands: Paratroopers Brigade
- Conflicts: 1947–1949 Palestine war Sinai Campaign; Six-Day War
- Awards: Medal of Courage
- Other work: Lecturer; Director of Community and Cultural Activities of the Golan and Jordan Valley

Aharon Davidi (Hebrew: אַהֲרוֹן דָּוִידִי; 1927 – February 11, 2012) was an Israeli general and founder of the Sar-El volunteer program of the IDF.

== Biography ==
He was born in Mandatory Palestine as the youngest son of an immigrant family from Bender (Bessarabia). At the age of fifteen, he served in the Haganah and Palmach. In the 1947–1949 Palestine war he fought on the southern front with the Negev Brigade, where he met his future wife, Hassida.

In 1953, Davidi volunteered for the new IDF Paratroopers Brigade as a company commander. The next year, the unit was very active in operations and other dangerous missions behind enemy lines. Davidi and his company supported Ariel Sharon's Unit 101 in the raid on Qibya Massacre, he and Sharon remained close friends. He was decorated for actions in the Gaza strip in 1955 with the Medal of Courage.

In the Sinai Campaign, Davidi, as Lieutenant-Colonel and regimental commander, played a decisive role in the battle of Mitla Pass. From 1965 to 1968, as a colonel, he was the first commander of the IDF Paratrooper and Infantry Corps. During the 1967 Six-Day War, Davidi commanded the decisive actions to capture Sharm-el-Sheik. When Raful Eitan was wounded in action, Davidi led his paratroopers to the Suez Canal.

In 1970 he retired as Brigadier from active military service and spent three years at the University of London earning his MA and PhD. He focused on the cultural problems of Chinese minorities.

Davidi began teaching geography at Tel Aviv University in 1974. Three years later, he moved to the Golan Heights as Director of Community and Cultural Activities of the Golan and Jordan Valley. In the summer of 1982, during the 1982 Lebanon War, Davidi founded the Sar-El IDF volunteer program which flourishes today with 5,000 world-wide volunteers a year. In 2010, Davidi won the Moskowitz Prize for Zionism.

Davidi, who lived in Ramat Gan, had three children, 11 grandchildren, and two great-grandchildren. His sister, Rivka Davidit, was a Hebrew children's author and theater critic.

Brig. Gen. (ret.) Dr. Aharon Davidi died on February 11, 2012.

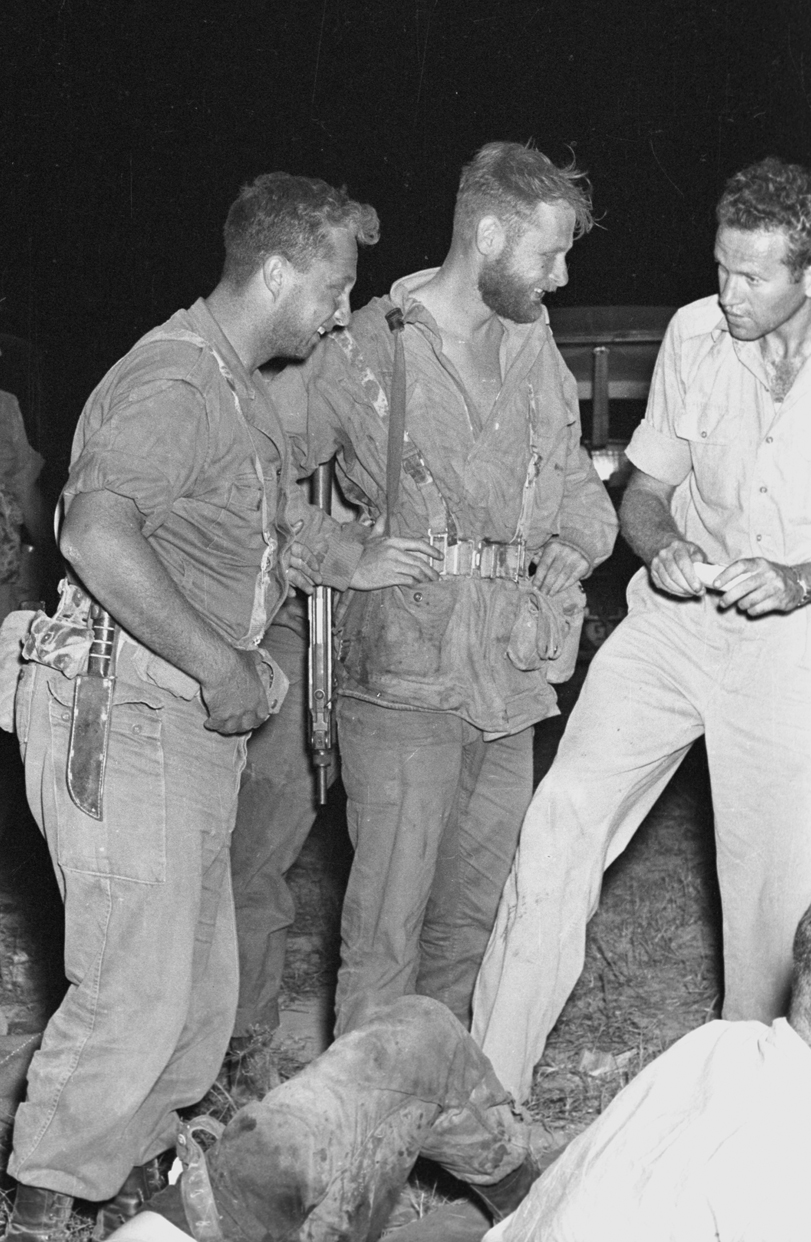
Davidi (center) with Ariel Sharon (left) and Yitzchak Ben Menachem shortly before Operation Olive Leaves (August 1955).

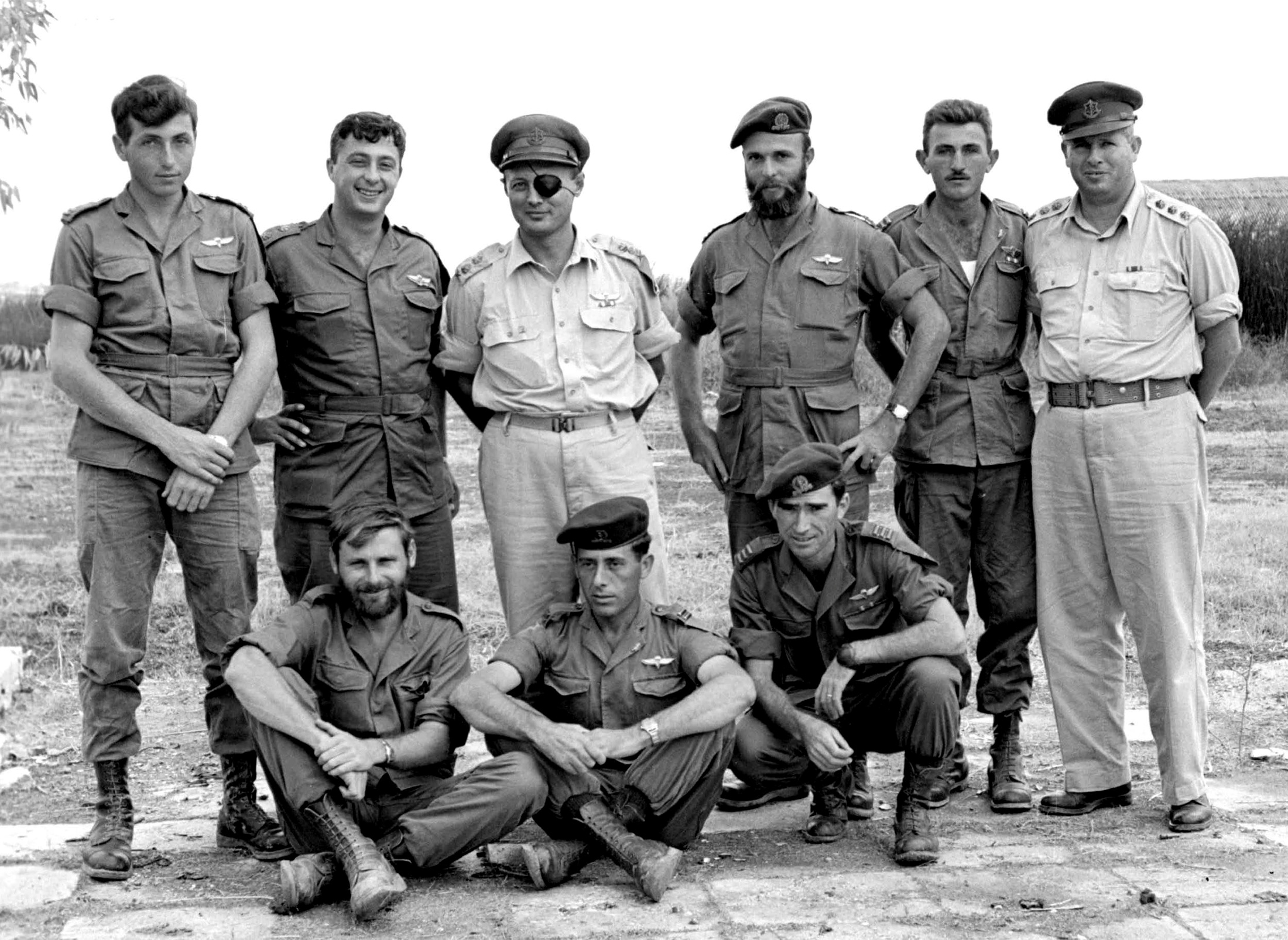
With members of 890th Paratroop Battalion after Operation Egged (November 1955). Standing l to r: Lt. Meir Har-Zion, Maj. Ariel Sharon, Lt. Gen Moshe Dayan, Capt. Dani Matt, Lt. Moshe Efron, Maj. Gen Asaf Simchoni; On ground, l to r: Capt. Aharon Davidi, Lt. Ya'akov Ya'akov, Capt. Raful Eitan.
