= Mefalsim =

Kibbutz in southern Israel

Mefalsim: מפלסים (Hebrew)
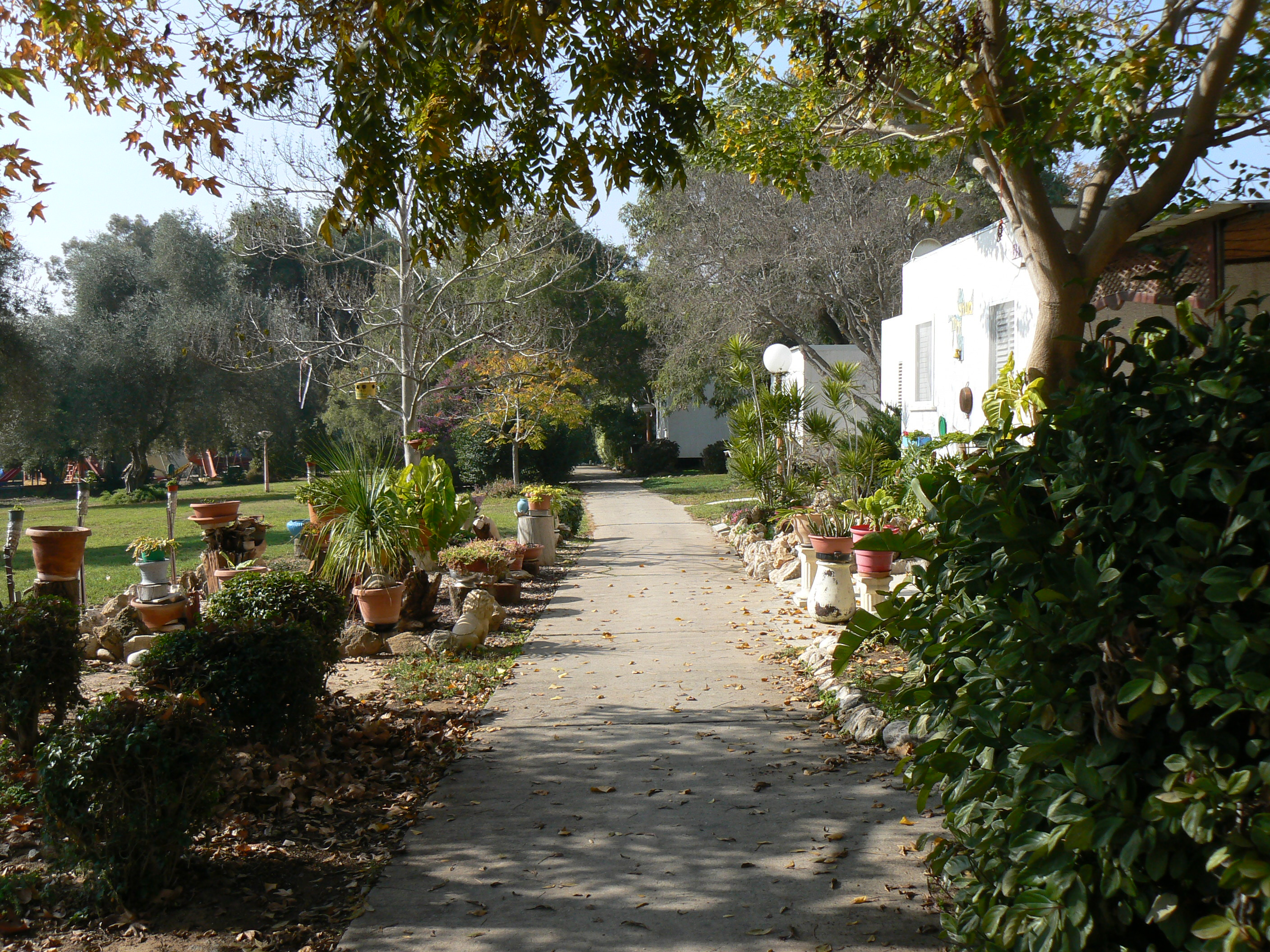
- Etymology: Road pavers
- Location within Northwest Negev region of Israel Location within Israel
- Coordinates: 31°30′7″N 34°33′52″E
- Country: Israel
- District: Southern
- Subdistrict: Ashkelon
- Council: Sha'ar HaNegev
- Affiliation: Kibbutz Movement
- Founded: 1949
- Founder: Argentine and Uruguayan Jews
- Population (2024): 949
- Website: www.mefalsim.co.il

Mefalsim (Hebrew: מפלסים, lit. 'Road pavers') is a kibbutz in southern Israel. Located near the western Negev city of Sderot and the Gaza Strip, and covering 11,000 dunams, it falls under the jurisdiction of Sha'ar HaNegev Regional Council. In 2024 it had a population of 949.

== History ==
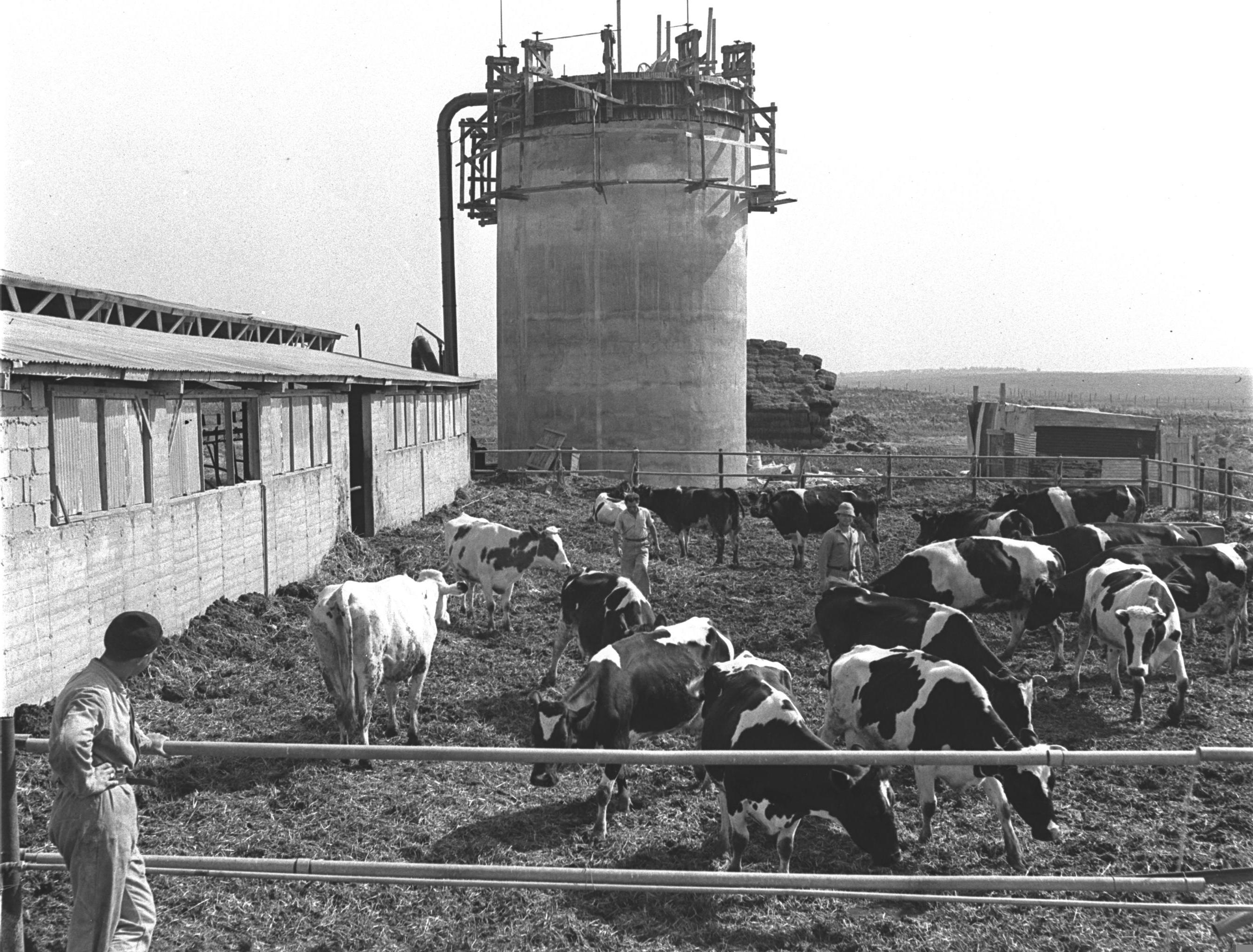
Mefsalim cattle farm in 1955

Mefalsim was established in 1949 by members of the Habonim Dror youth movement, most of them immigrants from Argentina and Uruguay. It was named "Mefalsim" to honor the immigrants from Latin America who paved (lefales) the way for others to make aliyah.

In 1966 the Argentine ambassador to Israel invited the kibbutz choir to perform Argentine folk music at the opening of the Argentine House in Jerusalem. This led to the establishment of Conjunto Mefalsim, a band that performed Argentine and Latin American music, appearing on radio and television. The band also recorded several albums.

In 2005 the kibbutz absorbed some of the evicted families after the Israeli disengagement from Gaza. Since 2001 the kibbutz has been hit by dozens of rockets launched from the Gaza Strip, with a few buildings destroyed, including the kindergarten in 2012. In 2018 the village was the first location set ablaze by a fire balloon.

On October 7, 2023, Hamas attacked Mefalsim as part of the invasion of Israeli communities in the October 7 attacks. The kibbutz's security team battled the attackers for hours, holding them off until IDF reinforcements arrived and cleared away additional Hamas gunmen approaching the kibbutz. 13 members of the IDF and three civilians were killed. Twelve foreign workers were rescued by the military.

== Economy ==
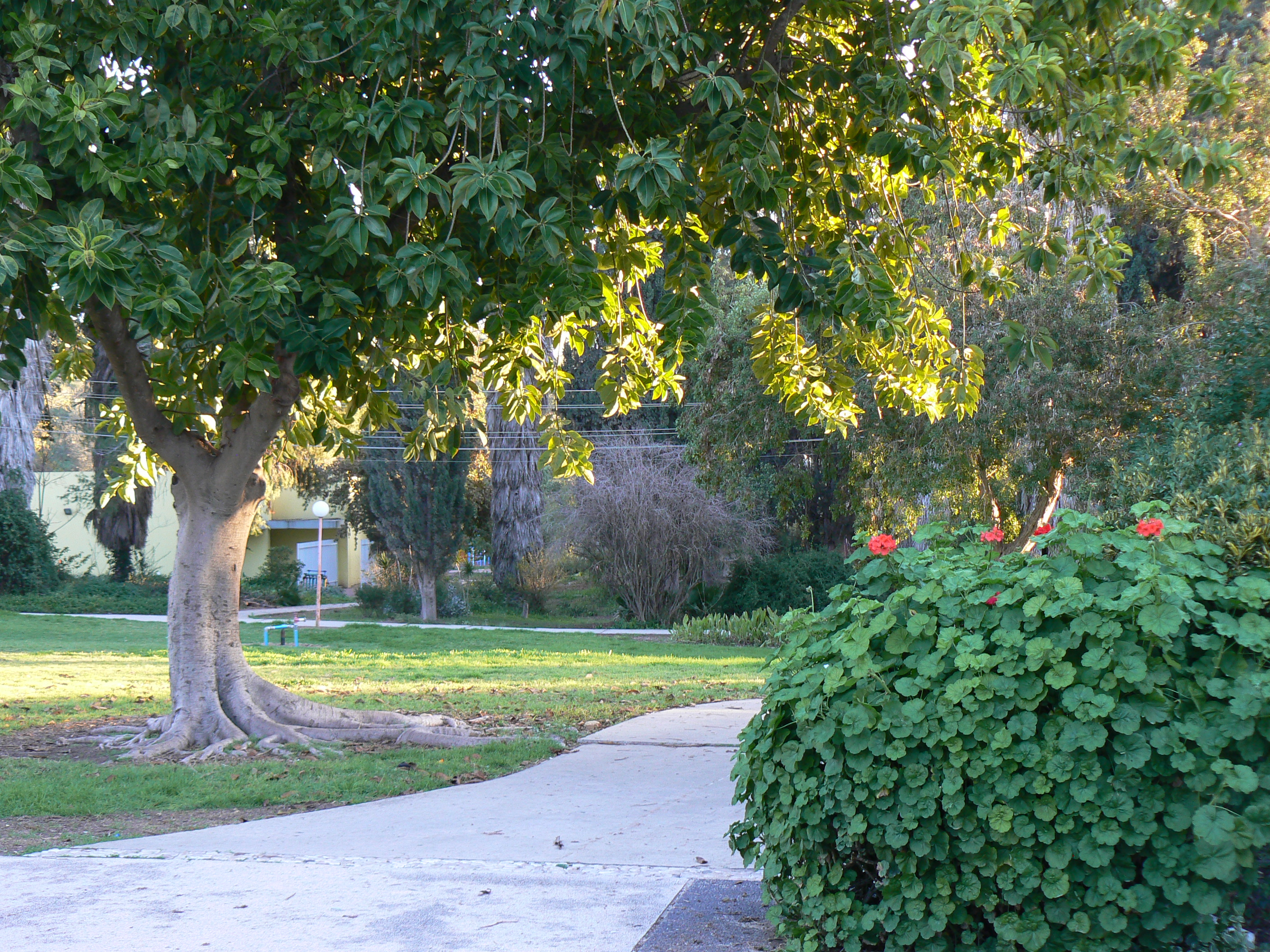
Garden in Mefalsim

In 2017, Kibbutz Mefalsim had 430 acres of citrus and almond groves. Joining other farmers in the region, fruit farmers from Mefalsim called on Israeli defense minister Avigdor Lieberman to grant entry permits to hundreds of Gazans to work in their orchards. Mefalsim-Kfar Aza is a farming cooperative that grows roots vegetables such as potatoes and carrots over an area of 14,000 dunams (roughly 3,500 acres).

In 2022, the Shibolet Group acquired an area of 22 dunams of kibbutz land for the establishment of a logistics center for industrial companies.

== Landmarks ==
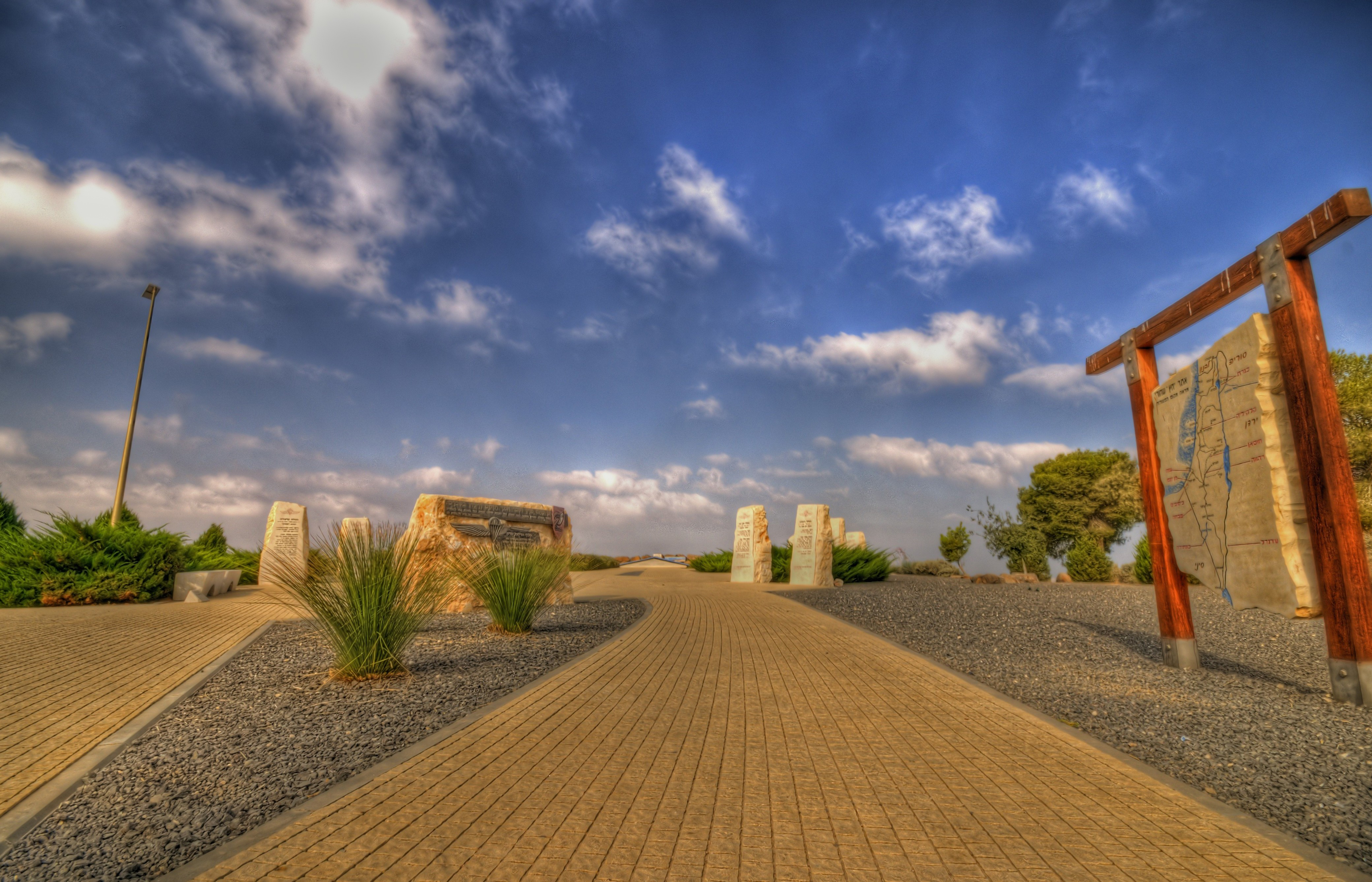
Black Arrow Memorial

An IDF memorial site, the Black Arrow Memorial is located on the outskirts of kibbutz Mefalsim.

== Archaeology ==
A stone weight of one nezef (c. 10 grams) from the 7th century BCE (Iron Age II) bearing a Hebrew inscription and found at Mefalsim, is now part of the national Israel Museum collections.

A cluster of mounds near Mefalsim, which includes Tel ʽIrit/Tell Wad ez-Zeit and Khirbet Deir Dusawi, is known as Tulul el-Humr/Humra ('red[dish] tells'). Tel ʽIrit is described by L.Y. Rahmani (1981) as containing "mainly Iron Age remains", while D. Eisenberg-Degen (2018) mentions it among a group of mounds of Late Byzantine pottery debris.

A broken marble slab bearing a fragmentary Greek inscription, probably funerary in purpose, was found at Tel Mefalsim/Tell er-Rusum, an archaeological site near Tel ‘Irit and situated between Mefalsim and Kfar Aza.

In 2017, a salvage excavation was conducted at Tel ʽIrit, southwest of Kibbutz Mefalsim, by the Israel Antiquities Authority. With a height of 15 m, it is the highest of six mounds of pottery workshop debris dated to the late Byzantine period (end of the sixth–beginning of seventh century CE), being part of an extensive pottery production centre of estimately twenty simultaneously operated kilns.

Among the sixth- to seventh-century findings at Tel Mefalsim and Kh. Deir Dusawi, Rahmani identifies several fragmentary ceramic toys: doll heads which could be mounted on rag dolls, and animal figurines (mainly horses and a possible camel) with loops instead of legs for axles and wheels, and a perforated extension in the front where a string could be attached for pulling the toy along.
