= Antisemitic trope =

False claims about Jews and Judaism

Antisemitic tropes, also known as antisemitic canards or antisemitic libels, are antisemitic "sensational reports, misrepresentations or fabrications" about Jews as an ethnicity or Judaism as a religion. (Note: Jews and Judaism are not interchangeable because Jewishness can be defined by ancestry or religious identity.; Krausz, Ernest; Tulea, Gitta (1997). Jewish Survival: The Identity Problem at the Close of the Twentieth Century. Transaction Publishers. pp. 90–. ISBN 978-1-4128-2689-1. "A person born Jewish who refutes Judaism may continue to assert a Jewish identity, and if he or she does not convert to another religion, even religious Jews will recognize the person as a Jew."; "Belonging without believing: British Jewish identity and God". Institute for Jewish Policy Research. 20 March 2024. Archived from the original on 30 December 2024. "Only a third of Jews living in the UK have faith in God, as described in the Bible, yet 'non-believers' make up more than half of paid-up synagogue memberships, according to data from the JPR National Jewish Identity Survey."; "Jews in U.S. are far less religious than Christians and Americans overall, at least by traditional measures". Pew Research Center. 13 May 2021. Archived from the original on 1 February 2025. "[In 2021] 12% of U.S. Jewish adults say they attend religious services weekly or more often, compared with 27% of the general public and 38% of U.S. Christians. And 21% of Jewish adults say religion is very important in their lives, compared with 41% of U.S. adults overall and 57% of Christians [...] There are even bigger gaps when it comes to belief in God. About a quarter of Jews (26%) say they believe in God as described in the Bible, compared with more than half of U.S. adults overall (56%) and eight-in-ten Christians. Jews are more likely than U.S. adults overall (50% vs. 33%) to say they believe in some other spiritual force or higher power, but not in God as described in the Bible. Jewish adults also are twice as likely as the general public to say they do not believe in any kind of higher power or spiritual force in the universe (22% vs. 10%).")

Since the 2nd century, malicious allegations of Jewish guilt have become a recurring motif in antisemitic tropes, which take the form of libels, stereotypes or conspiracy theories. They typically present Jews as cruel, powerful or controlling, some of which also feature the denial or trivialization of historical atrocities against Jews. Antisemitic tropes mainly evolved in monotheistic societies, whose religions were derived from Judaism, many of which were traceable to Christianity's early days. These tropes were mirrored by 7th-century Quranic claims that Jews were "visited with wrath from God" due to their supposed practice of usury and disbelief in his revelations. In medieval Europe, antisemitic tropes were expanded in scope to justify mass persecutions and expulsions of Jews. Particularly, Jews were repeatedly massacred over accusations of causing epidemics and "ritually consuming" Christian babies' blood.

In the 19th century, conspiracy theories about Jews plotting "world domination" by "controlling" mass media and global banking spread, which mutated into modern tropes about them being behind liberalism, capitalism and eventually a major libel that Jews "invented and promoted communism". These tropes fatefully formed Adolf Hitler's worldview, contributing to World War II and the Holocaust, which killed six million Jews and millions of others. Since the 20th century, the use of antisemitic tropes has been documented among various groups, including some that self-identify as "anti-Zionists".

Most contemporary tropes feature the denial or trivialization of anti-Jewish atrocities, especially the denial or trivialization of the Holocaust, or of the Jewish exodus from Muslim countries. Holocaust denial and antisemitic tropes are inextricable, typical of which is the libel that the Holocaust was "fabricated" or "exaggerated" to "advance" Jews' or Israel's interests.

== Political tropes ==
=== World domination ===
A Nazi German cartoon c. 1938 depicting Churchill as a Jewish-natured octopus reaching across the globe

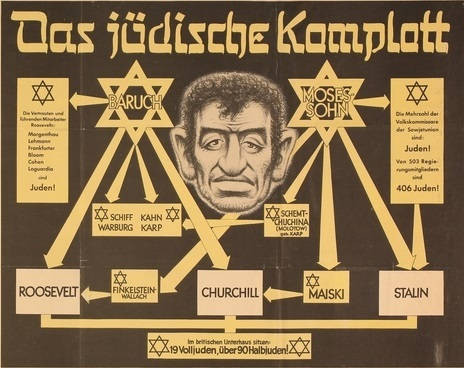
Nazi propaganda poster entitled Das jüdische Komplott ("The Jewish Plot")

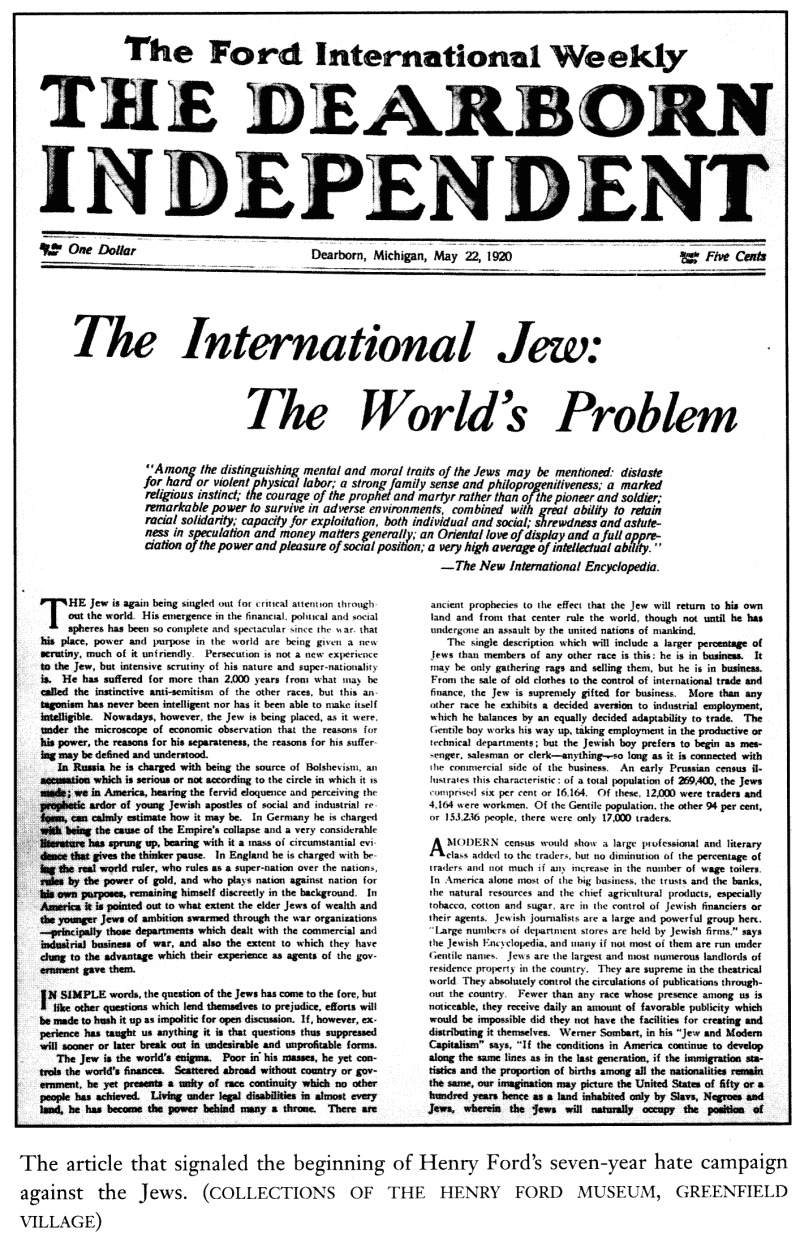
Article The International Jew: The World's Problem in Henry Ford's newspaper The Dearborn Independent, May 22, 1920

The publication of The Protocols of the Elders of Zion in 1903 is usually considered the beginning of contemporary conspiracy theory literature. The trope embodied by the book is manifested in both writings and imagery, where Jews are accused of plotting world domination nefariously. Typical examples include Nazi-originated cartoons depicting Jews as a giant octopus reaching across the globe. A 2001 Egyptian reprint of Henry Ford's antisemitic text The International Jew had the same octopus imagery on the front cover.

Among the earliest refutations of The Protocols of the Elders of Zion as a forgery were a series of articles printed in The Times in 1921, which revealed the forgery's content to have been plagiarized from the unrelated satire The Dialogue in Hell Between Machiavelli and Montesquieu. The Russian imperial state popularized the forgery to discredit the Bolsheviks by accusing Jews of organizing the Russian revolution. The forgery scapegoated Jews as the leading subversive force to try to dispel mass revolt and keep the empire united.

Later, the trope spread westward when the Great Depression and Nazism's rise catalyzed its dissemination. A Polish equivalent goes by Judeopolonia, which posited an imaginary Jewish domination of Poland. Contemporarily, the trope often goes by Zionist Occupation Government (ZOG), which accuses the Jews of "controlling Western governments" for selfish ends, like benefitting Israel. The ZOG is widely peddled by antisemites, such as the Neo-Nazis, white nationalists, Islamists and black supremacists.

Malcolm X, a well known Black American activist, believed in The Protocols of the Elders of Zion, which he introduced to the Nation of Islam (NOI) for circulation among their Black American audience. In 2003, the Malaysian Prime Minister Mahathir Mohammed drew a standing ovation at an OIC conference after alleging:

Today the Jews rule this world by proxy. They get others to fight and die for them [...] They invented socialism, communism, human rights and democracy so that persecuting them would appear to be wrong [...] they have gained control of the most powerful countries.

The New Black Panther Party (NBPP), a black separatist group, has actively peddled the myth. Prior to a 2006 Democratic primary runoff in the U.S. state of Georgia, the NBPP alleged

So-called Jews in Israel in what's really Palestine...some player haters, some Zionists, some so-called Jews who the Book of Revelations [...] calls the Synagogue of Satan.

When the NBPP-backed candidate Cynthia McKinney lost to her rival Hank Johnson, NBPP's members alleged "Jewish electoral domination".

In April 2017, Politico magazine published an article alleging "links" between the then–U.S. President Donald Trump, Russian dictator Vladimir Putin and Jewish religious group Chabad. Jonathan Greenblatt (CEO) of the Anti-Defamation League (ADL) condemned the article as "evok[ing] age-old myths about Jews". In December 2023, Australian Green MP Jenny Leong, echoed Mahathir Mohammed's 2003 speech at a Palestine Justice Movement forum:

the Jewish lobby and the Zionist lobby are infiltrating into every single aspect of what is ethnic community groups [...] they rock up to every community event because their tentacles reach into the areas that try and influence power.

Leong apologized after being condemned. Whereas, the "Jewish power" myth is often veiled as the "criticism" of "Jewish plutocrats" allegedly behind political changes. For instance, QAnon conspiracy theorists believe in the existence of a "satanic cabal" of global elites (globalists) "drinking children's blood" to achieve "world domination". Two-time heavyweight world champion Tyson Fury also believes in a "Zionist plot" to "lower" public moral standard via the media and finance. As per Argentine-Israeli educator Gustavo Perednik, antisemites often pass off their aggressive instinct as a "struggle" of "the oppressed" against the "powerful" to maximize its appeal to left-wing audience.

=== Controlling the media ===
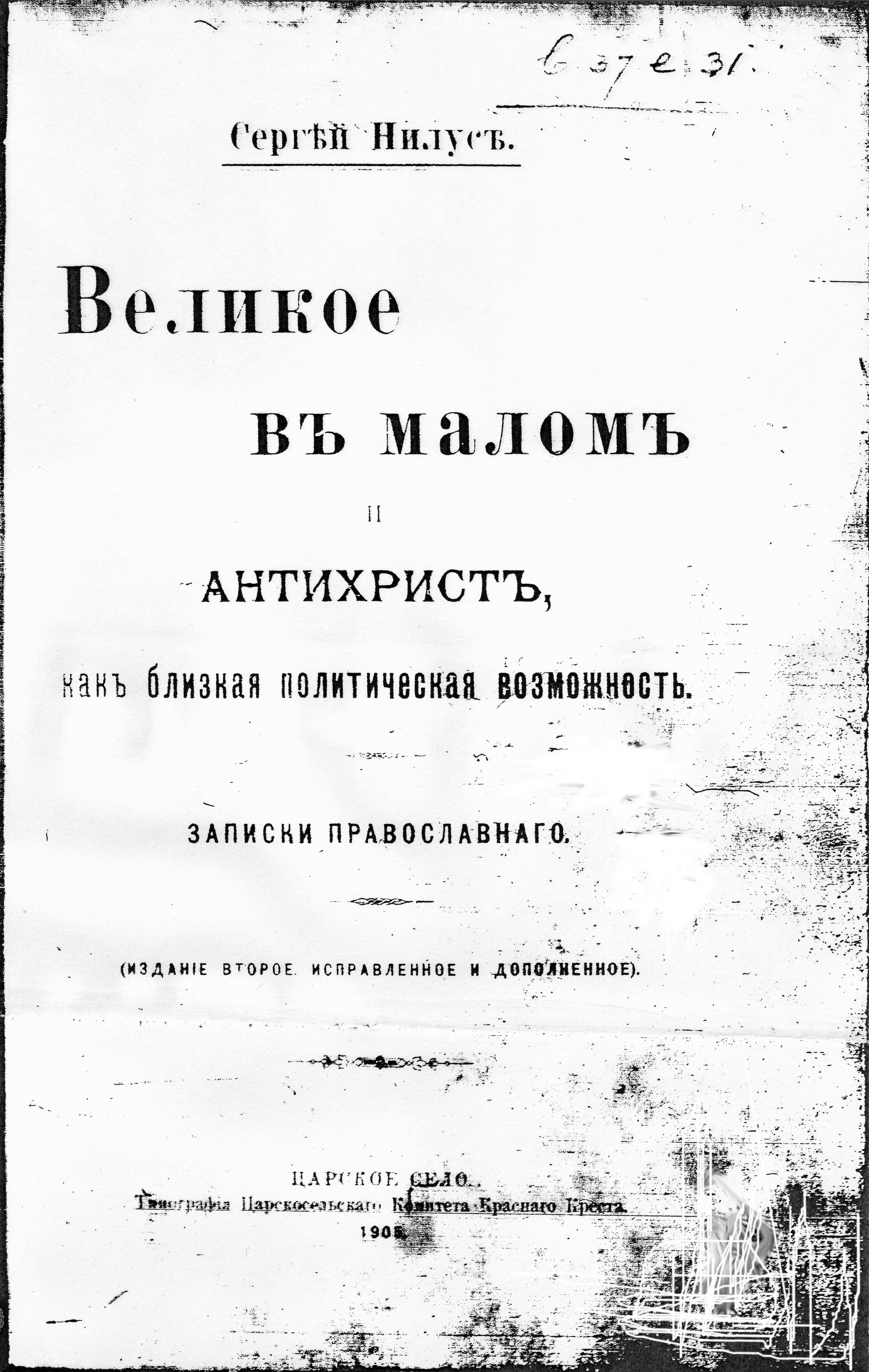
First edition of The Protocols of the Elders of Zion

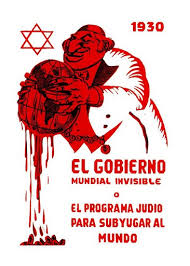
1930 Spanish reprint of The Protocols of the Elders of Zion

Another common antisemitic trope is that "the Jews control the media and Hollywood". In Eastern Europe, the Czech politician Tomáš Garrigue Masaryk, believed that Jews "controlled the press", despite his previous objection to antisemitism during the Hilsner affair. In Western Europe, Arthur Griffith, the founder of the Sinn Féin party decisive to Ireland's independence, was subscribed to the "Jewish media control" trope. Griffith alleged that Dublin newspapers were

almost all Jew rags [...] Fifty other rags like those which have nothing behind them but the forty or fifty thousand Jewish usurers and pick-pockets in each country and which no decent Christian ever reads except holding his nose as a precaution against nausea.

Griffith's antisemitism is still present in the party. For instance, lower house parliamentarian Réada Cronin alleged in 2020 that Jews were "responsible for European wars" and "Adolf Hitler was a pawn of the [Jewish] Rothschilds [...may] not have been too far wrong". In the United States, J.J. Goldberg, The Forward's editorial director, published a study of such trope in 1997. He concluded that despite Jews being "disproportionately represented" in the media, that those Jews are the most assimilated and therefore do not make a high priority of Jewish concerns. His example being the perceived negative treatment of Israel in the American media.

Variants on this theme focus on Hollywood, the press and the music industry.

=== White genocide conspiracy theory ===
Since 2015 when the European migrant crisis happened, the White genocide conspiracy theory has gained traction among white nationalists. Jews are often accused of facilitating unrestricted non-white immigration to alter the fabric of White-majority societies. Such libel is often peddled in conjunction with older myths, like the "Jewish power", to raise its plausibility among the targeted audience. Much of such sentiment stems from an extinction anxiety about the majority White population becoming outnumbered by the non-white population, who are often assumed as "foreign" and "incompatible" with the mainstream. Elon Musk, the current owner of X (formerly Twitter), has endorsed the theory in a tweet.

In the US, there have been several terrorist attacks associated with the belief in the theory, the most recent of which include the 2017 Unite the Right rally, where dozens of casualties occurred in a car ramming attack, and the 2018 Pittsburgh synagogue shooting, where 11 were killed and 7 injured. The SPLC noted,

The "great replacement" theory is inherently white supremacist. It depends on stoking fears that a non-white population, which the theory's proponents characterize as "inferior," will displace a white majority. It is also antisemitic. Some proponents of the "great replacement" do not explicitly attribute the plot to Jews. Instead, they blame powerful Jewish individuals such as financier and philanthropist George Soros or use coded antisemitic language to identify shadowy "elites" or "globalists."

== Economic tropes ==
=== Controlling the global financial system ===
The ADL documented several tropes that had associated Jews with banking, including the myth that "global banking is dominated by the [Jewish] Rothschild family" traceable to the medieval prevalence of Jews in moneylending.

=== Usury and profiteering ===
In the Middle Ages, Jews were restricted from most professions and pushed into marginalized occupations, such as tax collection and moneylending, due to the Catholic Church’s prohibition on Christians charging interest for loans. In 1179, the Third Council of the Lateran threatened excommunication for any Christians lending money at interest, prompting borrowers to turn to Jews for loans. Natural tension between gentile debtors and Jewish creditors reinforced pre-existing anti-Jewish biases. In England, the departing Crusaders were joined by debtors in the massacres of Jews at London and York in 1189–1190. In 1275, Edward I of England punished Jewish creditors by passing the anti-usury Statute of Jewry. Many English Jews were arrested, 300 of whom were hanged. In 1290, all Jews were expelled from England. German-American Jewish historian Walter Laqueur noted,

The issue at stake was not really whether the Jews had entered it out of greed [...] The high tide of Jewish usury was before the fifteenth century; as cities grew in power and affluence, the Jews were squeezed out from money lending with the development of banking.

=== Association with capitalism ===
Building on older tropes of Jews controlling finance and being inherently driven by greed, from the 20th century Jews were blamed for the exploitation of people under capitalism and were claimed to control the institutions that were driving capitalism.

=== Propagation of communism ===
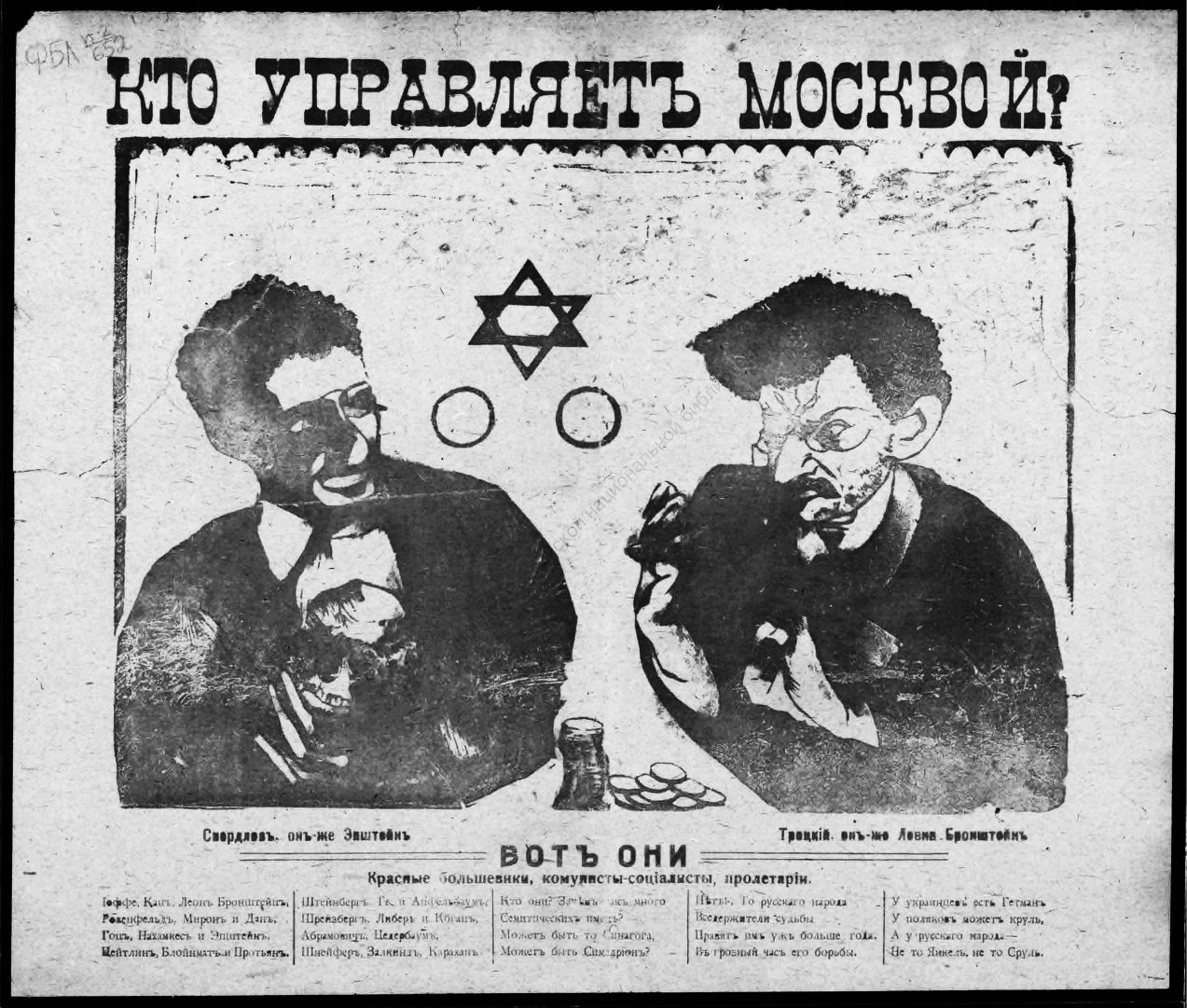
Antisemitic Russian White movement propaganda poster Who Rules Moscow? Here they are – Red Bolsheviks, Communists-Socialists, Proletarians (1919), caricature of senior Bolsheviks Yakov Sverdlov and Leon Trotsky with the Star of David, depicting the Bolsheviks as Jews oppressing Russians and striving for money and power

In the 20th century, newer allegations of Jews masterminding the propagation of Communism emerged, including The Protocols of the Elders of Zion (1903). Judeo-Bolshevism was popularized by Hitler's tendency to conflate Jews with communists and present them as an existential threat to justify the Holocaust. A Polish equivalent of this trope is Żydokomuna, which accused "most Jews" of having "collaborated with the Soviet Union" in "importing communism" to Poland. Candace Owens, a twenty-first century American conservative pundit, alleged that "Stalin was a Jew" and his followers were "part of a Jewish cabal".

=== Kosher tax ===
The "Kosher tax" trope claims that food producers are "forced" to pay an exorbitant premium to indicate that their products are kosher, which is allegedly passed on to consumers by price increase. It is mainly spread by white supremacists. Refuters contended that food producers would not engage in the certification process if it was not profitable to obtain the "kosher certification", which is actually a voluntary business decision, while the "resultant" increased sales would lower the average cost.

== Religious tropes ==
A Westboro Baptist Church picket sign alleging Jewish deicide

=== Guilt for the death of Jesus ===
Jews have been blamed for the crucifixion of Jesus throughout history:

When Pilate saw that he could prevail nothing, but that rather a tumult was made, he took water, and washed his hands before the multitude, saying, I am innocent of the blood of this just person: see ye to it. Then answered all the people, and said, His blood be on us, and on our children.

— Matthew 27:24–25

Jewish deicide was legitimized in Christian theology by Saint John Chrysostom (c. 4th century), a prominent Church Father. In the Second Vatican Council between 1962 and 1965, Pope Paul VI issued the Nostra aetate to refute the libel

What happened in His passion cannot be charged against all the Jews, without distinction, then alive, nor against the Jews of today.

Against radical traditionalists' objections, it was distantly followed up by an apology in 2000 for the two millennia of Catholic persecution of Jews, amid claims that the Second Temple menorah is still being hidden in the Vatican. Radical Traditionalist Catholics (rad trads) who oppose Christian–Jewish reconciliation have continued to peddle Jewish deicide. As per the SPLC, the rad trads frequently circulate content from the forgery The Protocols of the Elders of Zion. Notably, the rad trads have peddled:

- Jews are the "perpetual enemy" of Christ
- Adolf Hitler was the end-product of the Kulturkampf of the "Freemason" Otto von Bismarck
- Nazism was the "result" of a 400-year "revolution" against the Divine Plan to effect man's return to Him via His Catholic Church abetted by Talmudists
- Jews have "infiltrated" the Catholic Church to induce changes in church doctrine for selfish gain
- Catholics cannot trust the Jews
- The Vatican II dialogue with the Jews is a pantomime to destroy Catholic militancy against Judaism

The ADL noted

Traditionalist Catholics [...] continued to incorporate explicit antisemitism into their theology [...] a paranoid belief in Jewish conspiracies to undermine the church and Western civilization [...] preach that contemporary Jews are responsible for deicide, endorsed The Protocols of the Elders of Zion, and claimed that there was a factual basis for the medieval blood libel. One of its bishops, Richard Williamson, is a well known Holocaust denier.

=== Blood libel ===
The blood libel accusation's origin dates to the 12th century. The first recorded accusation against Jews was associated with the death of William of Norwich. Torture and human sacrifice in the blood libel run contrary to Judaism. The Ten Commandments forbid murder. The use of blood in cooking is banned by Kashrut as blood is deemed ritually unclean. The Hebrew Bible, or Old Testament, and Halakha portray human sacrifice as one of the evils separating the pagans of Canaan from the Hebrews. By the time of the writing of the Hebrew Bible, human sacrifice was not practiced among the Hebrews, and Jews were prohibited from performing these rituals. Ritual cleanliness for priests prohibited even being in the same room with a human corpse. Historian Alexis P. Rubin noted,

Church and secular leaders sharply denounced these defamations [...] people refused to abandon this myth [...] Popes, kings and emperors declared that Jews, if for no other reason than their strict dietary laws banning even the smallest drop of blood in meat or poultry, were incapable of the crime. The Christian populace was not impressed.

Among those who refuted the blood libel included the Holy Roman Emperor Frederick II and Pope Gregory IX, while Pope Clement VI said that the Black Death could not be blamed on Jews. Contemporarily, the blood libel still appears frequently in Muslim countries' state media, publications and online platforms as per their official anti-Zionism. (Note: Blood libel in the modern world: In 1986, Defense Minister of Syria Mustafa Tlass authored book The Matzah of Zion. The book renews anti-Jewish ritual murder accusations of 1840 Damascus affair and alleges that The Protocols of the Elders of Zion is a factual document.; "Iranian TV Blood Libel: Jewish Rabbis Killed Hundreds of European Children to use Their Blood for Passover Holiday & Discussion on Holocaust Denial". 22 December 2005. Archived from the original on 4 June 2011.; Gerber, Gane S. (1986). History and hate: the dimensions of anti-Semitism. Jewish Publication Society of America. p. 88. ISBN 0-8276-0267-7.) Various Arab writers have condemned the blood libel. The Egyptian newspaper Al-Ahram published articles by Osama Al-Baz, a senior advisor to the late Egyptian President Hosni Mubarak, explaining the origins of the blood libel.

=== Host desecration ===
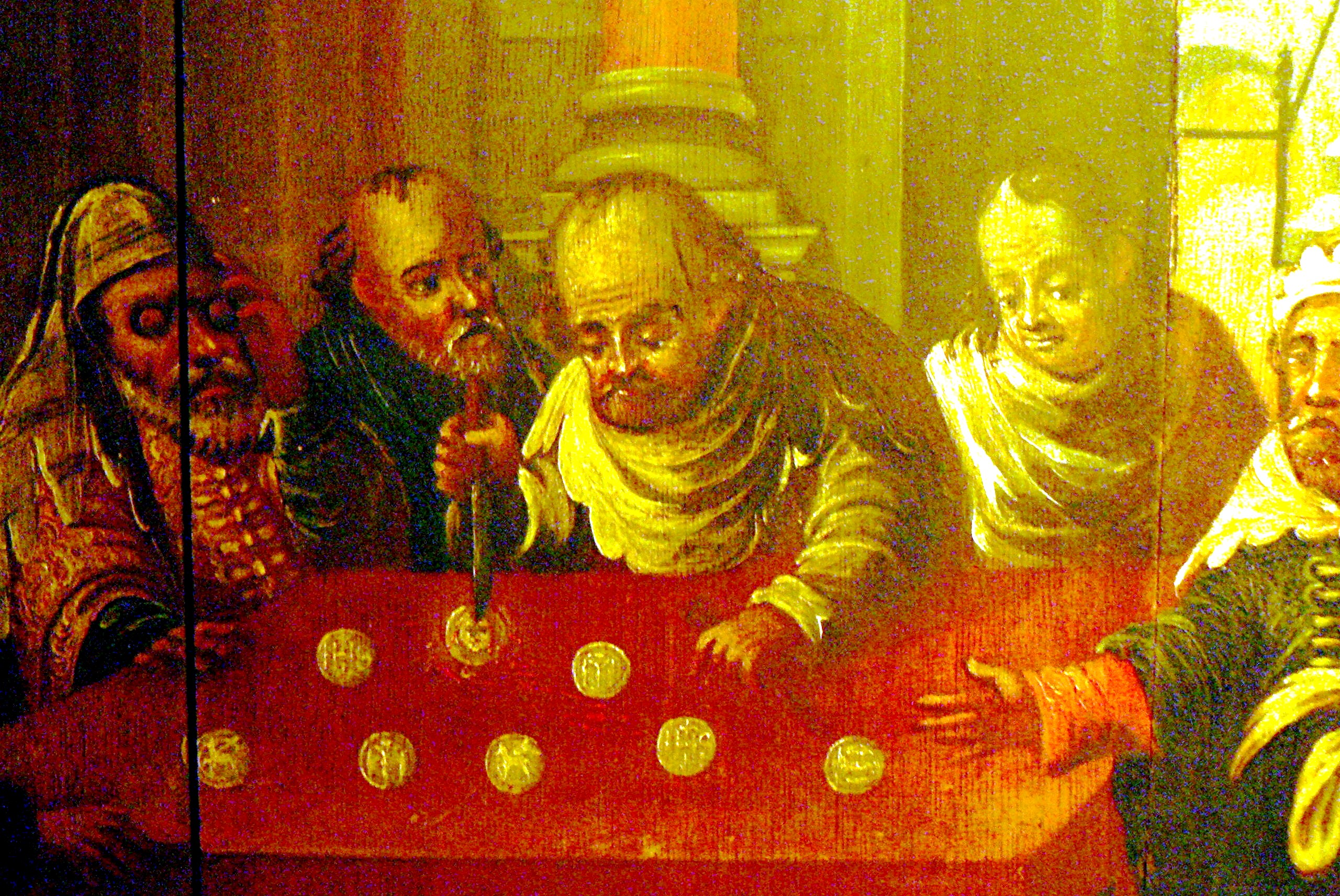
16th-century painting accusing Jews of host desecration in Passau, Germany

In medieval Europe, Jews were often accused of stealing hosts and desecrating them to reenact the crucifixion of Jesus by stabbing or burning. The first allegation of Jewish host desecration was made recorded in 1243 in Beelitz, near Berlin, and all Jews in Beelitz were burned alive, subsequently called the Judenberg. In the following centuries, similar libels circulated throughout Europe and caused several pogroms, which did not subside until Sigismund II Augustus repudiated it in 1558. However, massacres resulted from host desecration libels happened until the 19th century. The last recorded accusations were brought up in Barlad, Romania, in 1836 and 1867 respectively.

=== Accusations of anti-Christian conspiracy ===
Throughout history, Christians alleged that Jews either dislike or sought to destroy Christianity. A 65,000-word treatise written by Martin Luther, a pioneering 16th-century Christian reformer, also consists of such a libel that is still being promoted. For instance, radio host James Edwards alleged that Jews "hate Christianity" and were "using pornography as a subversive tool against us". The ADL noted

This is not to say that Jews have historically borne no animus towards Jesus and the Apostles, or towards Christianity as a whole. In the two-thousand year relationship between Judaism and Christianity, many of them marred by anti-Jewish polemic and Christian persecution of Jews, some rabbis have fulminated against the church [...] But contemporary anti-Semitic polemicists are not interested in learning or reporting about the historical development of Jewish-Christian relations. Their goal is to incite hatred against Judaism and Jews by portraying them as bigoted and hateful.

=== Demonization in Christianity ===
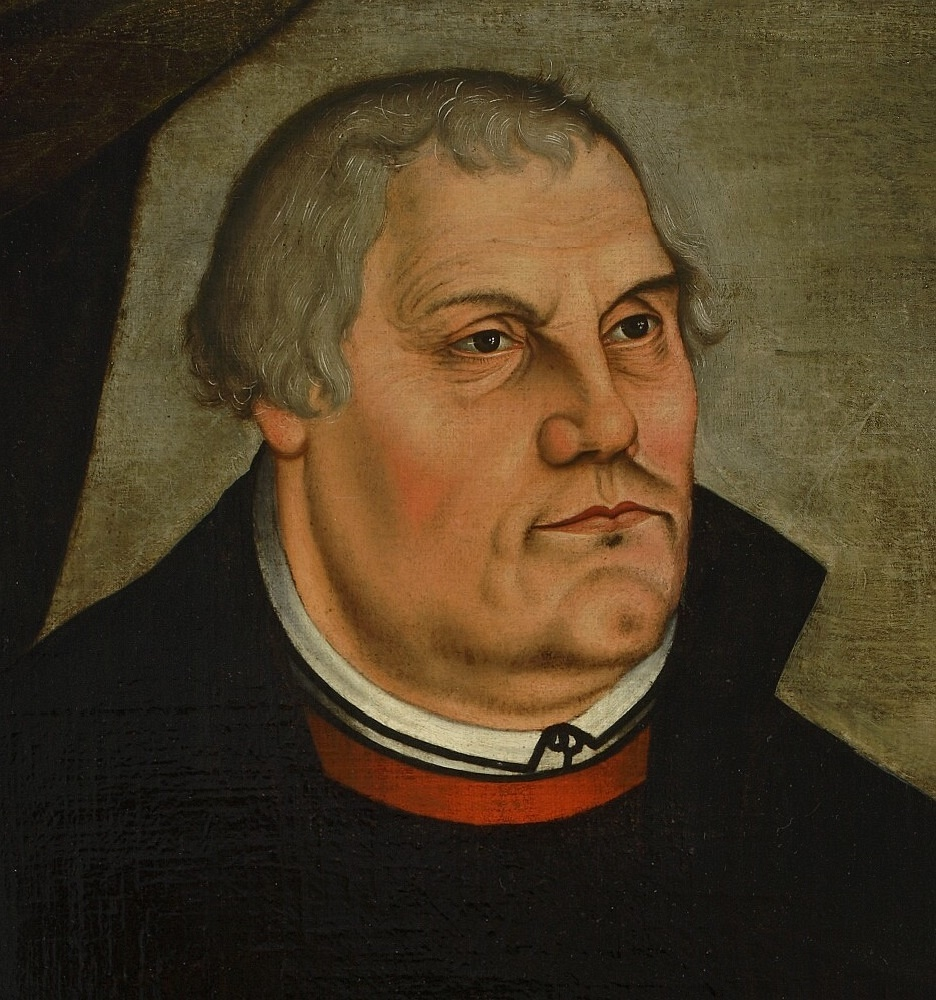
Cranach the Younger's portrait of Martin Luther, widely used on postcards in Nazi Germany

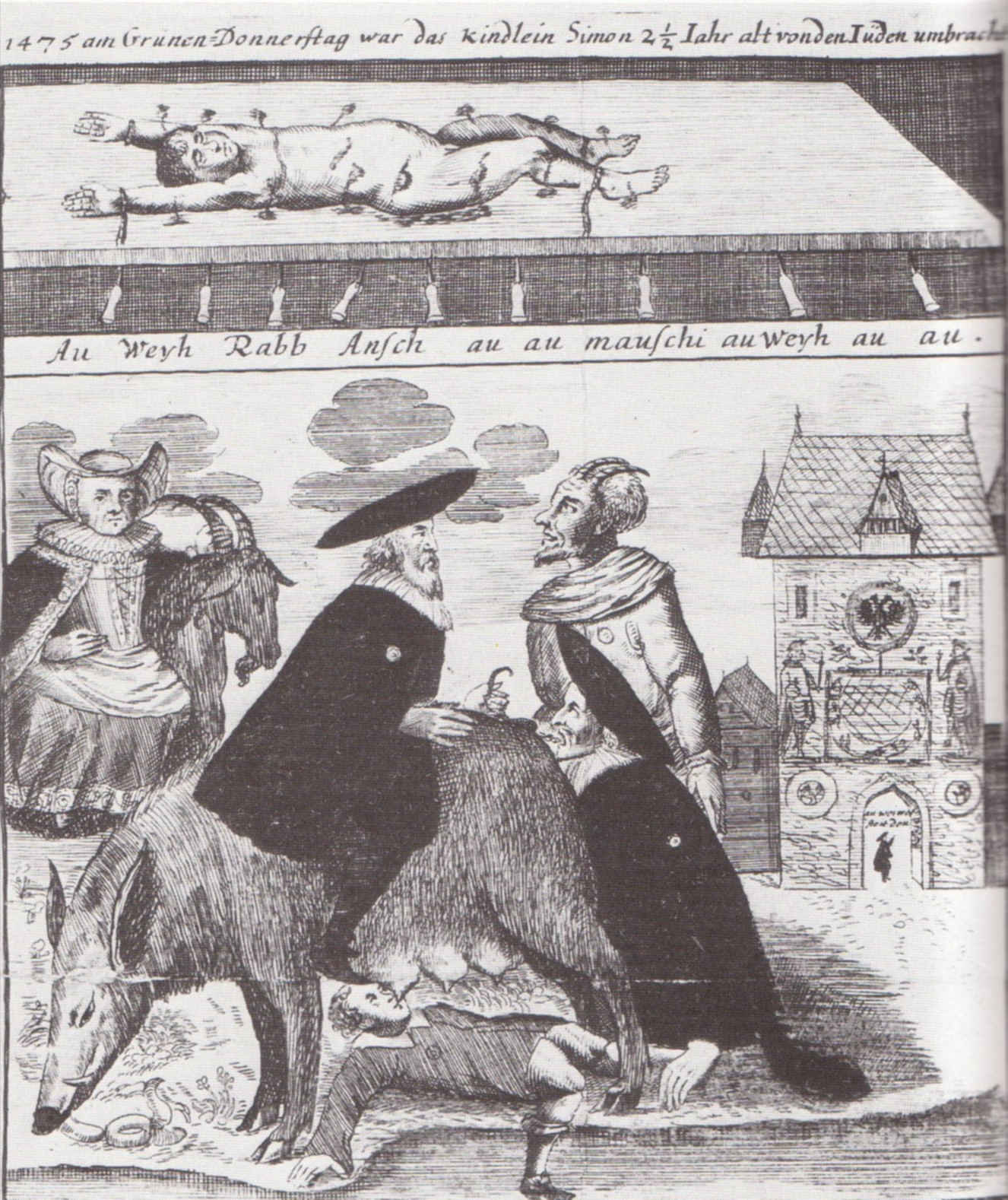
17th-century Judensau engraving, based on a 15th-century painting

As early as the 4th century, Church Father Saint John Chrysostom described a synagogue as

worse than a brothel and a drinking shop [...] a den of scoundrels, the repair of wild beasts, a temple of demons, the refuge of brigands and debauchees, and the cavern of devils, a criminal assembly of the assassins of Christ.

His anti-Jewish homily was legitimized in Christian theology as the basis of Christian antisemitism for the following millennia, ultimately subject to Nazi co-optation to garner Christian support for the Holocaust. In such regard, historian Jeremy Cohen wrote,

Yet the very impulse that propelled the Christian imagination from the Jew as a deliberate killer of Christ to the Jew as a perpetrator of the most heinous crimes against humanity also led to the portrayal of the Jew as inhuman, satanic, animal-like, and monstrous [...] the bestiality of the Jew climaxed in the image of the Judensau.

Judensau (German: Jews' sow) is a dehumanizing imagery of Jews that appeared around the 13th century. Its popularity lasted for six centuries until Nazi revival. Sculptures of Jews, typically portrayed in "obscene human contact" with unclean animals like pigs and owls, were often found on cathedral or church ceilings, pillars, utensils, etchings etc. The images always combined multiple antisemitic motifs, which sometimes included derisive prose or poetry. (Note: Cohen also noted Dozens of Judensaus [...] intersect with the portrayal of the Jew as a Christ killer. Various illustrations of the murder of Simon of Trent blended images of Judensau, the devil [...] and the Crucifixion. In a seventeenth-century engraving from Frankfurt [...] a well-dressed, very contemporary-looking Jew has mounted the sow backward and holds her tail, while a second Jew sucks at her milk and a third eats her feces. The horned devil, himself wearing a Jewish badge, looks on and the butchered Simon, splayed as if on a cross.) Martin Luther, a 16th-century Reformation's pioneer, was noted for his vicious antisemitism. Luther wrote a 65,000-word thesis demonizing the Jews in which he not only described Jews as

a base, whoring people, that is, no people of God, and their boast of lineage, circumcision, and law must be accounted as filth [...] and the synagogue [...] incorrigible whore and an evil slut,

but also called for extreme violence towards Jews within Europe. Martin Luther was elevated to an unprecedented status in Nazi Germany. Luther's antisemitic thesis is considered by many Western historians to have brought about the Holocaust, despite the 400-year lapse.

=== Demonization in other religions or movements ===
Beyond Abrahamic religions, the demonization of Jews is also common among new religious movements, one of which is the Black Hebrew Israelites. Black Hebrew Israelites (BHI) believe that African Americans are descendants of ancient Israelites. However, the BHI are not associated with either Jews or Christians.

Just as the "Messianic Judaism" founded by Conservative Baptist Association's Evangelical priest Moishe Rosen, the BHI do not meet any criteria for being Jewish. The BHI have seen themselves as the only "real Jews". They deny contemporary Jews' Jewish ancestry and historical connection to Israel. BHI have accused contemporary Jews of being "European converts to Judaism" and running the Atlantic slave trade, implying that they are "White oppressors". Several BHI sects have been classified as hate groups by at least three American civil rights groups, the ADL, SPLC and SWC, with the ADL claiming that not all BHI sects were antisemitic.

Such BHI-espoused antisemitic tropes have been popularized to discredit Jews by associating them with White supremacy. BHI sects deemed antisemitic include the Israelite School of Universal Practical Knowledge (ISUPK), House of Israel (HOI), Nation of Yahweh (NOY), Israelites Saints of Christ, True Nation Israelite Congregation and The Israelite Church of God in Jesus Christ (ICGJC). The ADL summarized the commonly used BHI slurs:

- Jew-ish: Negative term for depicting Jews as "imposters"
- So-called Jews: Casting doubt on the Jewish identity of mainstream Jews
- Synagogue of Satan: An ancient slur borrowed to express dislike of Jews

BHI groups or members have also been involved in domestic terrorism towards Jewish Americans since the 1970s, the most recent of which include the Jersey City Shooting (7 dead and 3 injured). The BHI, to some extent, managed to desensitize the public to their anti-Jewish terrorism by appropriating Jewish symbols and misusing their historically oppressed status to gain sympathy from anti-racist intellectuals.

The Unification Church (UC), founded by South Korean religious leader Sun Myung Moon in 1954, was criticized for demonizing Jews in its manifesto Divine Principle. A multi-faith panel that included Rabbi A. James Rudin, the assistant director of the American Jewish Committee's department of interreligious affairs, pointed out 125 antisemitic references in their manifesto, including the libel that Jews were "collectively responsible" for the crucifixion of Christ. Rudin argued that UC's manifesto included "pejorative language, stereotyped imagery, accusations of collective sin and guilt", including its claim that "Jews had gone through a course of indemnity" due to John the Baptist's "failure to recognize Jesus as the Messiah". It is also found that the UC's text portrayed the Holocaust as a "divine punishment". The UC denied the AJC's charges as "distortion" and "obscurations".

=== Male menstruation ===
The false belief of Jewish male anal menstruation emerged in the 16th century, which formed part of the canard that all Jews were somehow female. The false belief was allegedly based on scripture associating Jews with bleeding, particularly the description of Judas' death in Acts 1:18–19, where his belly was allegedly burst open, which inspired further accounts of heretics having their blood or entrails spilled via the anus at death. It was, in the 12th century, referenced to the blood curse invoked by the Jews at Jesus' trial before Pilate. In the following century, a pseudoscientific explanation based on humoral medicine was added, supplemented by a verse from Psalms 78:66. By 1302, it was claimed that Jewish male descendants of those alleged to have "taken responsibility" for the crucifixion of Jesus would suffer a monthly bleeding. A 1503 account of the 1494 ritual murder trials at Tyrnau consisted of the earliest mention of the alleged monthly male bleeding. In 17th-century Spain, the notion was revived by physicians, including the king's, conflating menstruation with hemorrhoids, which contributed to the "legal concept" of "impure blood" in a family or race.

=== Well poisoning ===
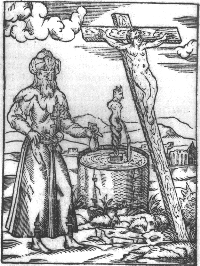
Medieval depiction of a Jew poisoning a well during an alleged ritual murder

During the devastating 14th century Black Death, crowded cities were hard hit, with death tolls as high as 50%. Emotionally distraught survivors scapegoated Jews opportunistically. Soon after the Black Death's entry to Europe in 1346, massacres of Jews broke out between 1348 and 1351 based on false charges of Jews "spreading" the epidemic. The first massacres happened in Toulon in 1348, where the Jewish quarter was sacked and 40 Jews murdered, then in Barcelona. In 1349, massacres and persecution spread across Europe, including the Erfurt massacre, Basel Massacre and massacres in Aragon and Flanders. 2,000 Jews were also burned alive in the Strasbourg massacre on 14 February 1349 by antisemites. Such accusations later became an antisemitic trope, which evolved into the one fabricated by Joseph Stalin as the doctors' plot in the early 1950s, then the charges of Jews "spreading" intractable diseases like the AIDS and COVID-19.

== Other tropes ==
=== Causing wars, revolutions and calamities ===
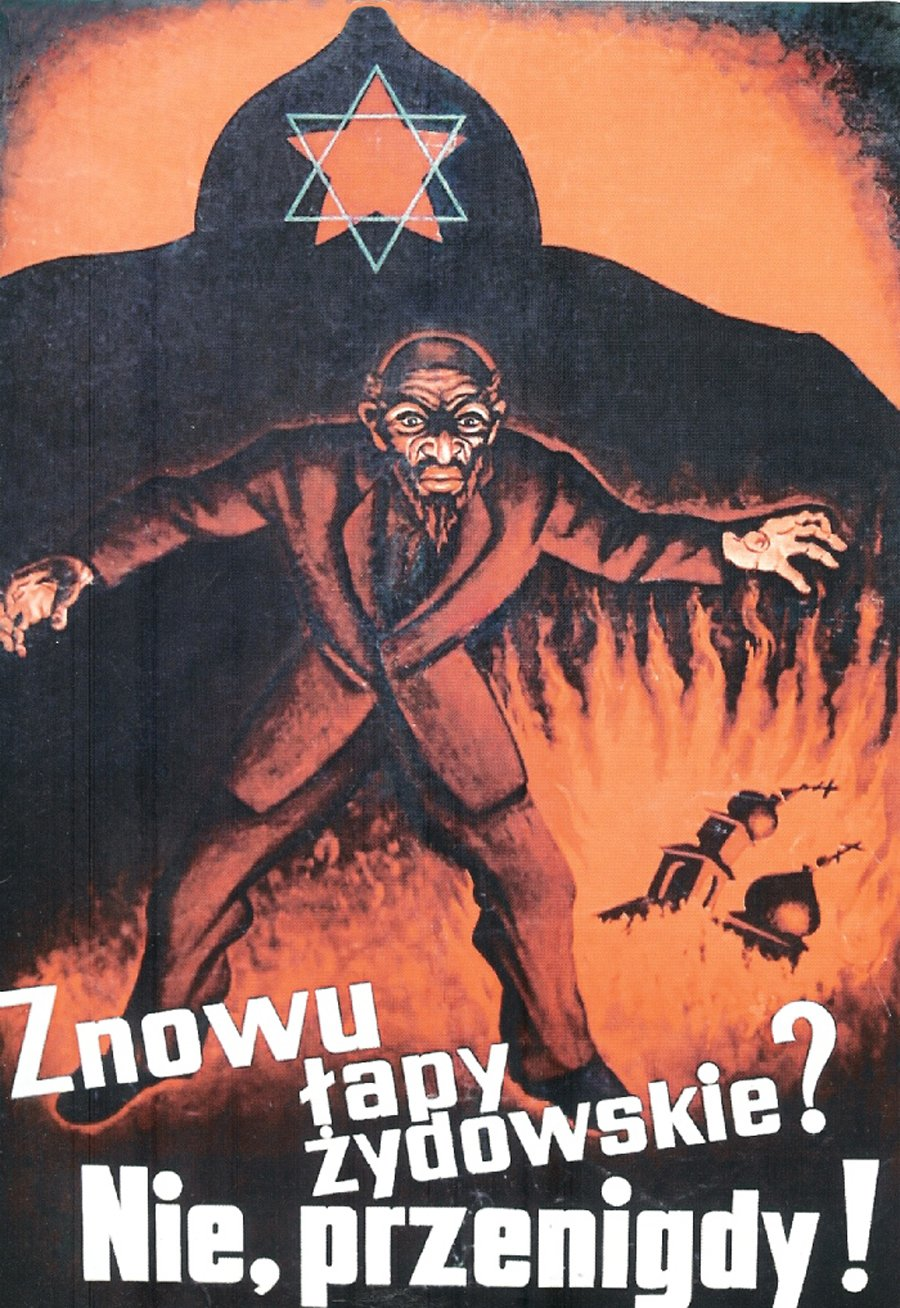
Antisemitic poster dated to the Polish–Soviet War of 1919–1921

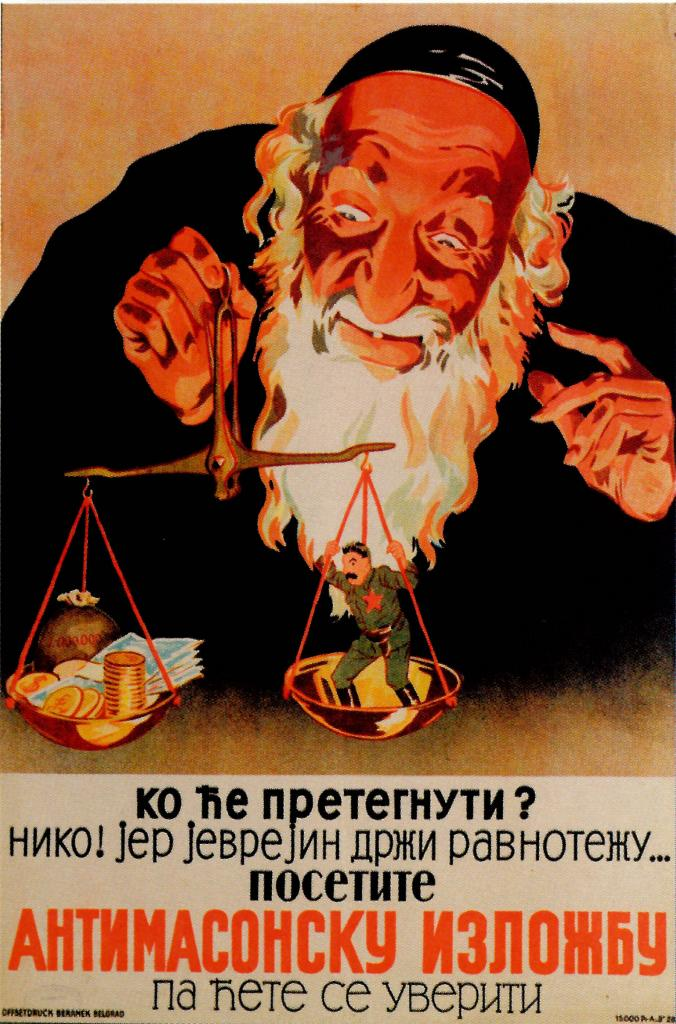
1941 antisemitic poster in German-occupied Serbia showing a Jew behind both capitalism (represented by money) and communism (Stalin)

German politician Heinrich von Treitschke in the 19th century coined the phrase "Die Juden sind unser Unglück!" ("The Jews are our misfortune!"), which became Der Stürmer's motto. Israeli-British historian Efraim Karsh noted,

Jews have traditionally been accused of lacking true patriotism to their countries of citizenship, and instead seeking to embroil their non-Jewish compatriots in endless conflicts and wars on behalf of such cosmopolitan movements and ideals as 'world imperialism', 'international bolshevism', or 'world Zionism'.

Both ends of the political spectrum accused American Jews of "dragging" the country into World War II and the Iraq War, exaggerating the influence of an alleged Israel lobby. It was also promoted by political scientist John Mearsheimer in a 2007 book, which was criticized for legitimizing the "Jewish domination" trope and encouraging antisemitism. The Franklin Prophecy was unknown before its appearance in 1934 in William Dudley Pelley's pro-Nazi magazine Liberation. As per the 2004 U.S. Congress report Antisemitism in Europe: Hearing Before the Subcommittee on European Affairs of the Committee on Foreign Relations,

The Franklin "Prophecy" is a classic anti-Semitic canard that falsely claims that American statesman Benjamin Franklin made anti-Jewish statements during the Constitutional Convention of 1787. It has found widening acceptance in Muslim and Arab media, where it has been used to criticize Israel and Jews [...]

=== Turning people LGBT ===
In 2016, Middle East Media Research Institute (MEMRI) highlighted a video in which a Kuwaiti Salafi preacher alleged that SpongeBob SquarePants and other youth cartoons were created by Jews in order to promote homosexuality, atheism, Satanism and the "emo movement". In 2018, Nation of Islam leader Louis Farrakhan accused Jews of "turning men into women and women into men" with a "specially concocted strain of marijuana" invented to make Black men gay and effeminate.

In 2020, conspiracy theorist Rick Wiles endorsed a claim by some "Messianic Jews" that "Zionists" seek to "make all of humanity androgynous" as per the Kabbalistic concept of Adam Kadmon. They alleged that the plot involved "Zionist" support for transgender rights to "make people LGBT" by "putting specific things in food, in drink". Contrarily, some lesbian feminists have accused Jews of being "killers of the Goddess" over their perception of the god of Israel being male to blame Jews for women's mistreatment under the "patriarchy".

=== Controlling the weather and causing natural disasters ===
On March 16, 2018, Council of the District of Columbia member Trayon White posted a video on his Facebook page showing snow flurries falling, alluding to the conspiracy theory of the Rothschild family conspiring to manipulate the weather. In his post, he stated, "Y'all better pay attention to this climate control, man, this climate manipulation ... And that's a model based off the Rothschilds controlling the climate to create natural disasters they can pay for to own the cities, man. Be careful." The comment was widely reported in Washington and worldwide media as an endorsement of an antisemitic conspiracy theory. The Washington City Paper reported on March 19 that this was not the first time in which White alluded to a Jewish conspiracy to control global weather.

The belief that Jews use space lasers to manipulate the weather, or the belief that Jews use space lasers to cause natural disasters, also dates back to 2018, when U.S. Representative Marjorie Taylor Greene suggested that the Camp Fire wildfires in Butte County, California were caused by lasers which were emitted from "space solar generators" in a scheme which companies such as Rothschild & Co and Solaren were involved in. Despite her denial of antisemitic intent in relation to her belief in this theory, supporters of Greene quickly blamed the wildfires on Jews. Greene was condemned by the Republican Jewish Coalition, the Conference of Presidents of Major American Jewish Organizations, and Christians United for Israel. Journalist and author Mike Rothschild, who is unrelated to the Rothschilds, also condemned these statements.

=== Provoking or fabricating antisemitism ===
During a speech at the Reichstag on 30 January 1939, Adolf Hitler accused "international Jewish financiers" of seeking to start a world war, but that this would be turned against them in an "annihilation of the Jewish race in Europe", for which the Jews would be fully to blame.

In 2002, the then-Hamas leader Abdel Aziz al-Rantisi asked, "People always talk about what the Germans did to the Jews, but the true question is, 'What did the Jews do to the Germans?'" Gilad Atzmon stated, "Jewish texts tend to glaze over the fact that Hitler's 28 March 1933, ordering a boycott against Jewish stores and goods, was an escalation in direct response to the declaration of war on Germany by the worldwide Jewish leadership." In January 2005, 19 members of the Russian State Duma demanded that Judaism and Jewish organizations be banned in Russia, alleging that "most antisemitic actions in the whole world are constantly carried out by Jews themselves with a goal of provocation." After sharp protests by Russian Jewish leaders, including Russia's Chief Rabbi Berel Lazar, human rights activists and the Russian Foreign Ministry, the Duma members retracted their appeal.

=== Dual loyalty ===
A trope found in The Protocols of the Elders of Zion, but originating long before that document, is that Jews are more loyal to world Jewry than to their own country. Since Israel's reestablishment in 1948, libels of Jews being more loyal to Israel than to their country of residence and citizenship have become widespread in different countries.

=== Cowardice and lack of patriotism ===
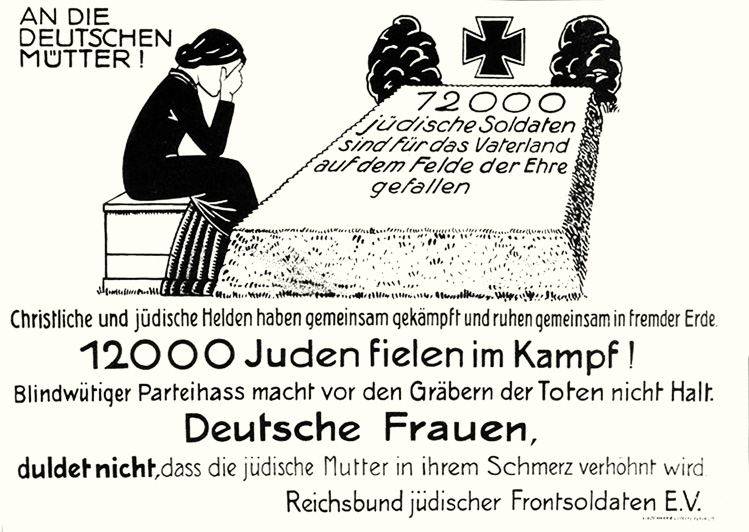
"12,000 Jewish soldiers died on the field of honor for the fatherland." A leaflet published in 1920 by German Jewish veterans to counter the stab-in-the-back myth

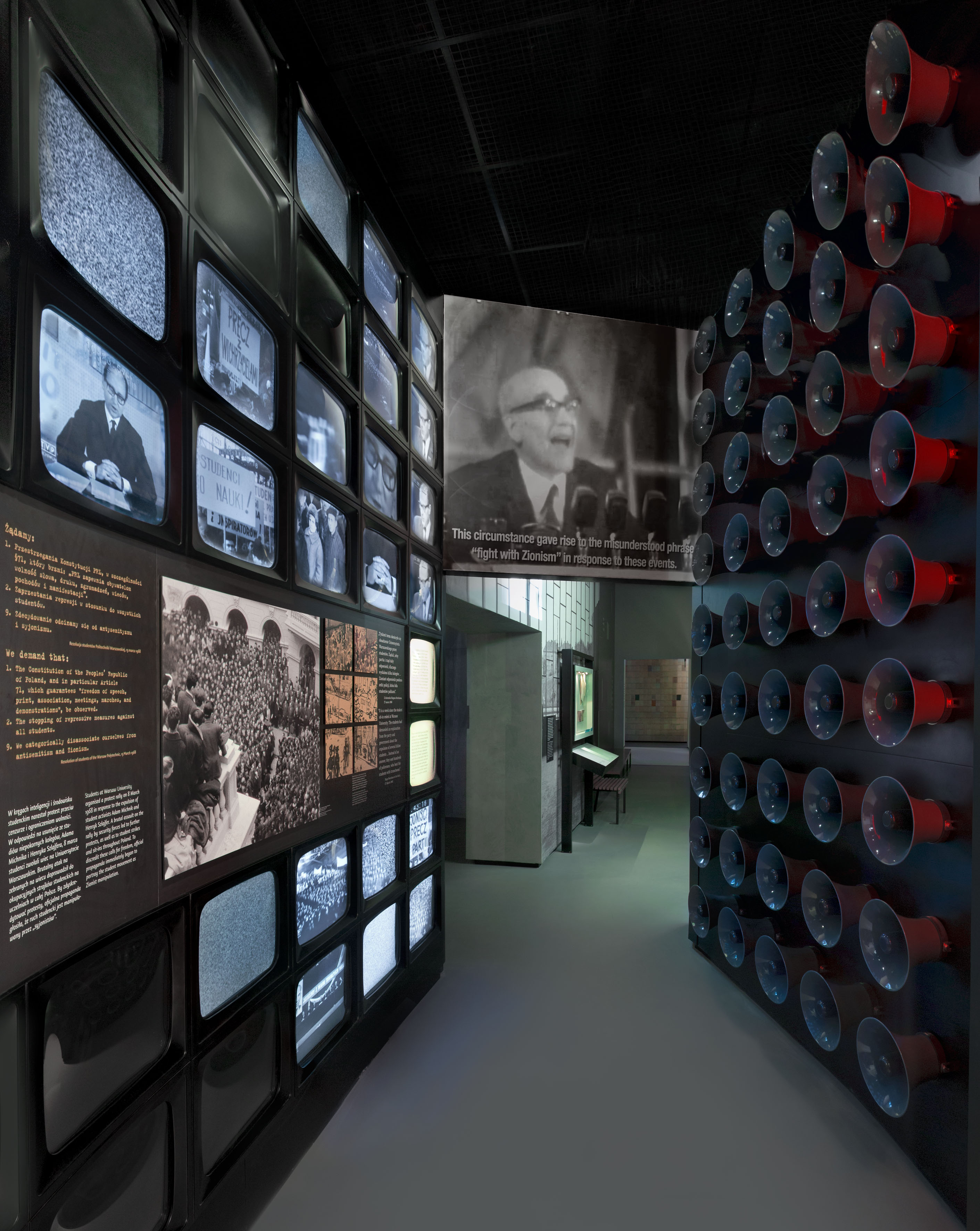
A permanent exhibition dedicated to the 1968 communist antisemitic purge in the POLIN Museum of the History of Polish Jews, Warsaw

With the rise of racist theories in the 19th century, "[a]nother old anti-Semitic canard served to underline the putative 'femininity' of the Jewish race. Like women, Jews lacked an 'essence'". In Genocide and Gross Human Rights Violations, Kurt Jonassohn and Karin S. Björnson wrote:

Historically, Jews were not allowed to bear arms in most of the countries of the diaspora. Therefore, when they were attacked, they were not able to defend themselves. In some situations, their protector would defend them. If not, they only had a choice between hiding and fleeing. This is the origin of the anti-Semitic canard that Jews are cowards.

Jews were frequently accused of being insufficiently patriotic. In late 19th-century France, a political scandal known as the Dreyfus affair involved the wrongful conviction for treason of a young Jewish French officer. The political and judicial scandal ended with his full rehabilitation. During World War I, the German Military High Command implemented the Judenzählung (German for "Jewish Census"), which was designed to "confirm" allegations of the "lack of patriotism" among German Jews, but the results of the census disproved the accusations and were not made public. After the end of the war, the stab-in-the-back myth alleged that internal enemies, including Jews, were responsible for Germany's defeat.

In Stalin's Soviet Union, the statewide campaign against "rootless cosmopolitans", a Soviet euphemism for Jews, was set out on 28 January 1949 with an article in the party's official newspaper Pravda:

unbridled, evil-minded cosmopolitans, profiteers with no roots and no conscience [...] Grown on rotten yeast of bourgeois cosmopolitanism, decadence and formalism [...] non-indigenous nationals without a motherland, who poison with stench [...] our proletarian culture.

Such propaganda was followed by state campaigns of persecution until Stalin's death in 1953, which involved mass termination of Soviet Jewish doctors and liquidation of the Jewish Anti-Fascist Committee based on false charges of treason, espionage and association with Zionism. The anniversary of the murders was commemorated by Soviet Jewry Movement's activists from the 1960s until the end of the Soviet Union.

In 1968, the Soviet-supported Polish People's Republic exploited pre-existing antisemitism to peddle similar claims, equating Jewish origins with "disloyalty" and "Zionist sympathies", to blame Polish Jews for the anti-communist mass protests. A purge of Polish Jews, most of whom were Holocaust survivors, ensued. The purge caused the exodus of 5,000–10,000 Polish Jews – around 20–33% of those remaining back then. An apology was made by the democratic Polish government in March 2018.

=== Ethnocentrism ===
Many antisemitic conspiracy theory websites cherry-picked quotes from Jewish religious writings to justify the libel that Judaism is "racist [...] teaching Jews to hate non-Jews." As per rabbi Joseph Soloveitchik,

Even as the Jew is moved by his private Sinaitic Covenant with God to embody and preserve the teachings of the Torah, he is committed to the belief that all mankind, of whatever color or creed, is "in His image" and is possessed of an inherent human dignity and worthiness. Man's singularity is derived from the breath "He [God] breathed into his nostrils at the moment of creation" (Genesis 2:7). Thus, we do share in the universal historical experience, and God's providential concern does embrace all of humanity.

As per the minutes of a 1984 U.S. Congress hearing concerning the Soviet Jewry, the demonization of Jews based on bogus "ethnocentrism" charges was common:

This vicious anti-Semitic canard, frequently repeated by other Soviet writers and officials, is based upon the malicious notion that the "Chosen People" of the Torah and Talmud preaches "superiority over other peoples", as well as exclusivity. This was, of course, the principal theme of the notorious Tsarist Protocols of the Elders of Zion.

=== Fabricating or exaggerating the Holocaust ===
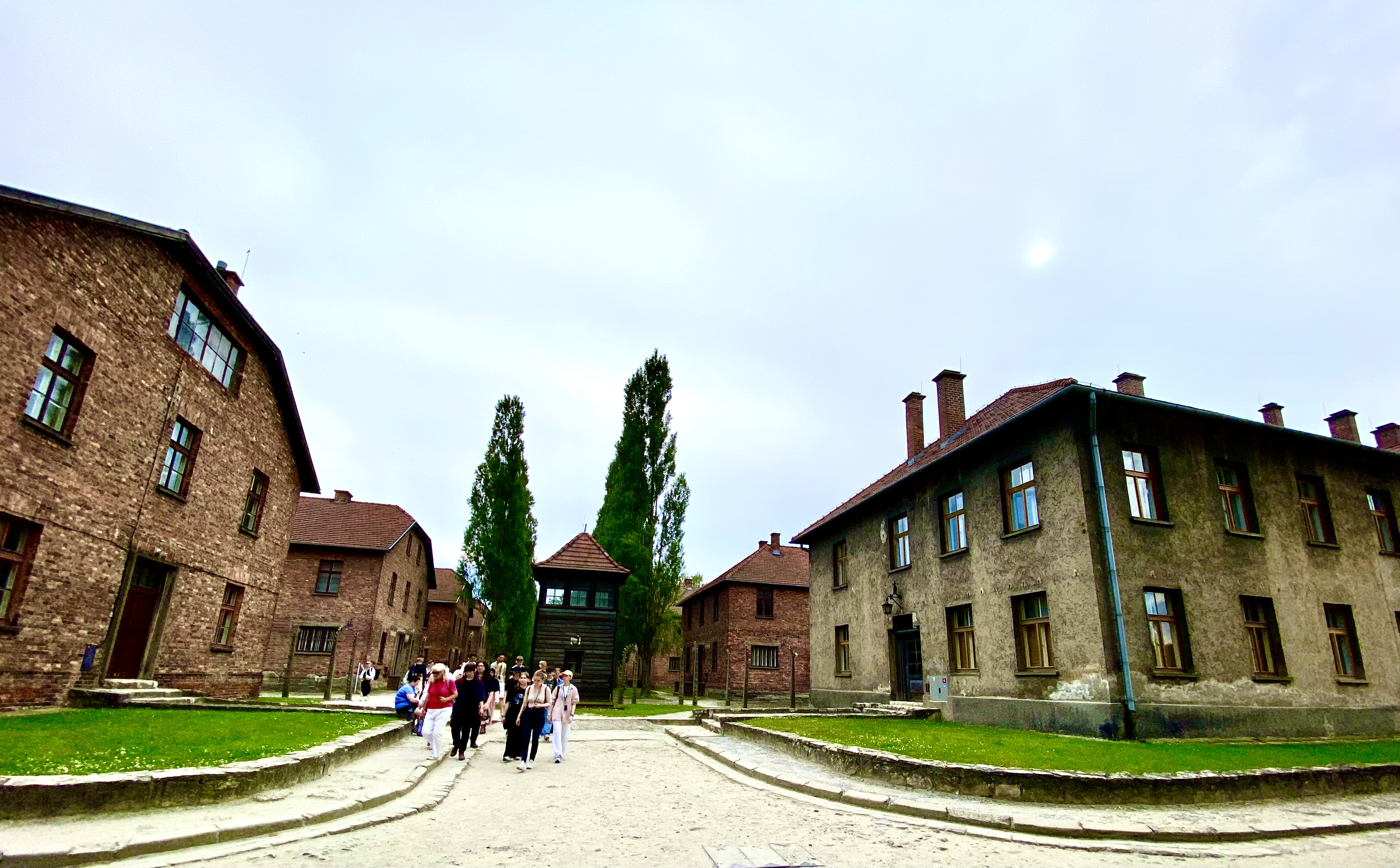
The Auschwitz concentration camp

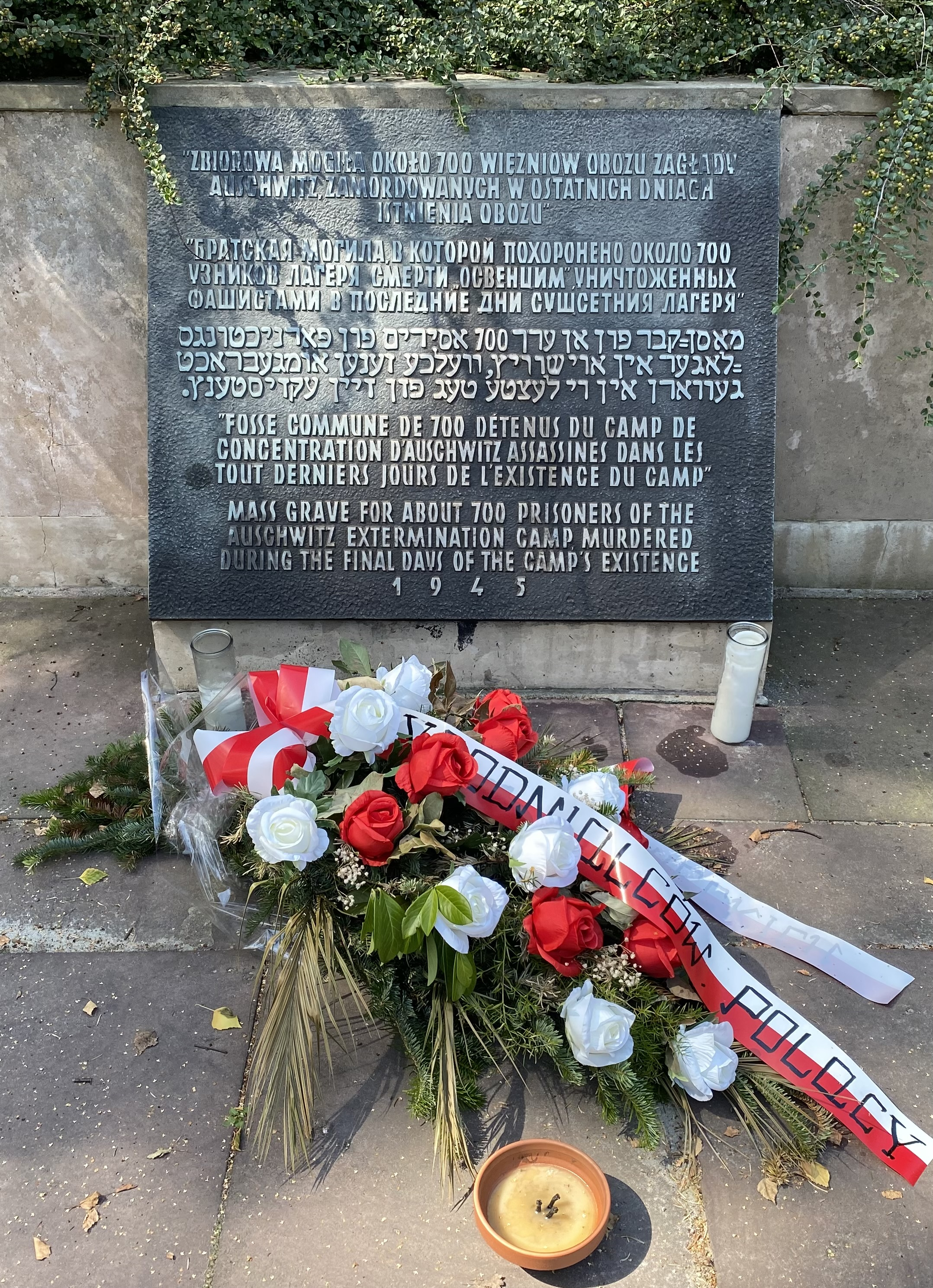
A Holocaust memorial outside Auschwitz concentration camp I

Holocaust denial consists of claims that the genocide of Jews during World War II – usually referred to as the Holocaust – did not occur at all, or it did not happen in the manner or to the extent which is historically recognized. Key elements of these claims are the rejection of the following facts:

- The Nazi regime had a policy of deliberately targeting Jews for extermination as a people
- At least six million Jews were systematically killed by the Nazis and their allies
- Genocide was carried out at extermination camps using tools of mass murder, such as gas chambers.

Most Holocaust denial claims imply, or openly state, that the Holocaust is a "hoax" committed out of a "deliberate Jewish conspiracy" to advance the "Jewish interests". Nowadays, outright denial is no longer socially acceptable. It has, however, morphed into more devious forms involving antisemitic tropes' usage to distort relevant events for fabricating Jewish guilt and legitimizing antisemitism. Distortion of the Holocaust refers, inter alia, to intentional efforts to excuse or minimize the impact of the Holocaust or its principal elements, including collaborators and allies of Nazi Germany. Other factors are gross minimization of the number of the victims of the Holocaust, in contradiction to reliable sources, and attempts to blame the Jews for causing their own genocide. Statements have been made casting the Holocaust as a positive historical event. Those statements are not Holocaust denial but are closely connected to it as a radical form of antisemitism. They may suggest that the Holocaust did not go far enough in accomplishing its goal of "the Final Solution of the Jewish Question". Finally, there have been attempts to blur the responsibility for the establishment of concentration and death camps devised and operated by Nazi Germany by putting blame on other nations or ethnic groups. As such, Holocaust denial is antisemitic. Holocaust deniers are condemned for ignoring all the evidence disproving their falsehood.

Holocaust deniers include the late "anti-Zionist" Egyptian President Gamal Abdel Nasser, former Iranian President Mahmoud Ahmedinejad, late Hezbollah leader Hassan Nasrallah, late French professor Robert Faurisson, French teacher Vincent Reynouard, British author David Irving, and German chemist Germar Rudolf.

In 2010, a poll found that 56% of citizens in Egypt, Jordan, Lebanon, Morocco and the UAE believed that the Jews "deserved the Holocaust", most of whom were found to hold the following beliefs:

- A Jewish propaganda machine had promoted the Holocaust myth to extract huge sums of money from Germany and justify the founding of the state of Israel.
- The Jewish victims died of natural causes or were sentenced to death for criminal reasons.
- The Allied Powers deliberately inflated the number of Jews killed during the war.

In 2014, another global survey found that almost half (or 3.65 billion people) of the world population (then 7.3 billion) did not know that the Holocaust ever happened, which was said to make them more susceptible to antisemitic tropes, especially Holocaust-denying ones.

=== Holocaust inversion ===
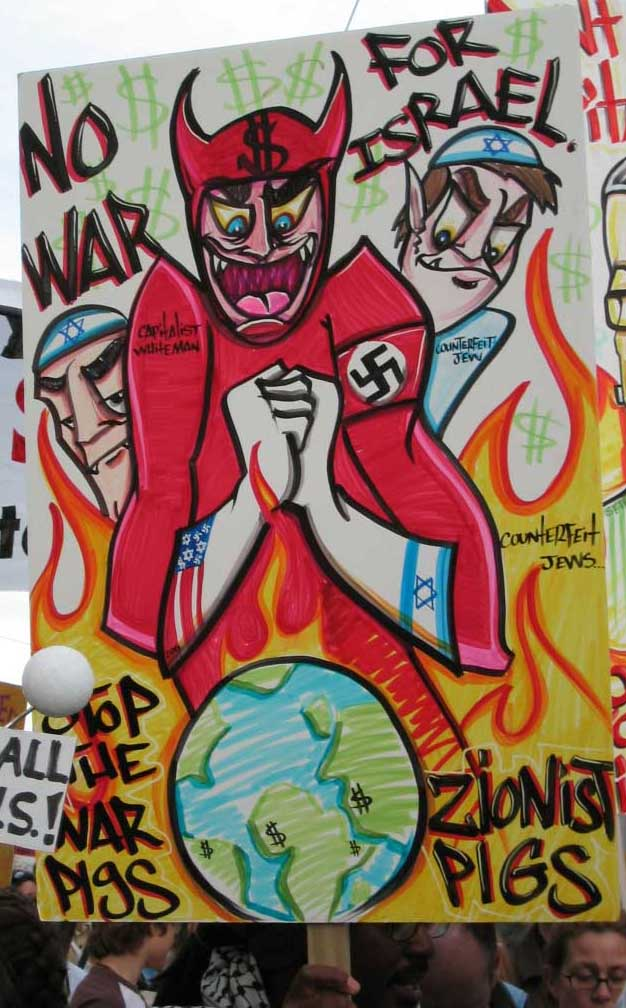
Antisemitic cartoon poster spotted at an "anti-war" rally in San Francisco on February 16, 2003, exemplifying both "money-minded Jews" and "Zio-Nazis" tropes. The ZIONIST PIGS (Note: A modified variant of the medieval European antisemitic slur Jewish pigs, later popularized by Martin Luther in the 16th century.) slur was also used.

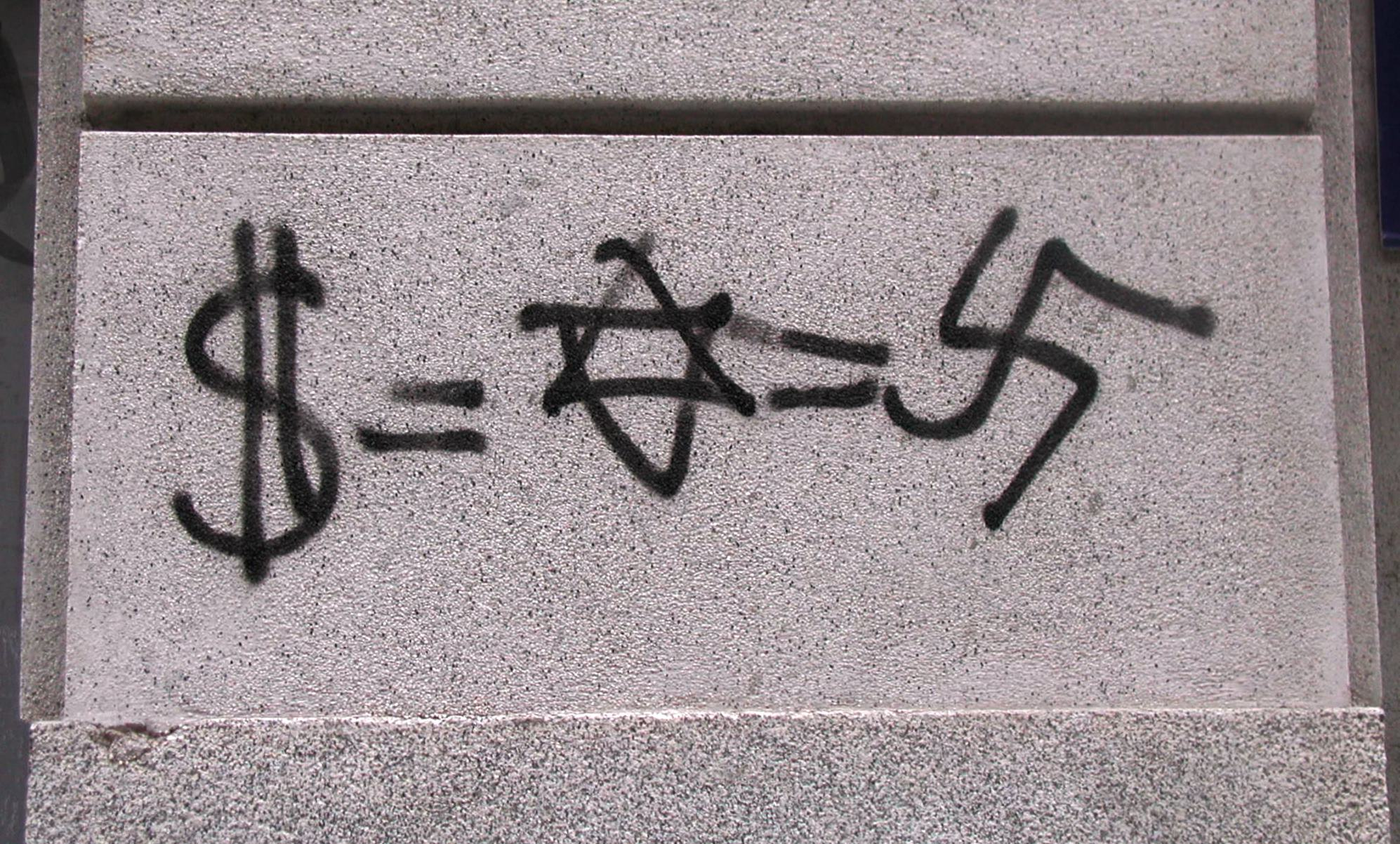
Graffiti in Madrid, 2003, equating the Star of David with the dollar and the Nazi swastika

Scholars have noted that "the main motif in Arab cartoons about Israel features 'the devilish Jew'" and that the central antisemitic idea of portraying Jews as embodiments of absolute evil includes several recurring sub-themes. These themes have reappeared throughout history, though their form has changed depending on the dominant narratives of each era. Such demonization by association with Israel is termed the Holocaust inversion. Holocaust inversion is an inversion of reality where Jews, the Holocaust's primary victims, are transposed into being the primary perpetrators to erase their historical victimhood and justify antisemitism. It is deemed a form of Holocaust trivialization. The World Jewish Congress noted that Holocaust inversion could be manifested as:

- Portraying Jews as Nazis
- Comparing Israeli prime ministers to Hitler and portraying the Star of David as equal to the swastika
- Images showing Anne Frank wearing a kaffiyeh
- Comparing the Nakba to the Holocaust
- Comparing the Gaza Strip to Jewish ghettos during the Holocaust

In such regard, the French philosopher Bernard-Henri Lévy remarked,

[...] a mass movement demanding the deaths of Jews will be unlikely to yell "Money Jews" or "They Killed Christ." [...] for such a movement to emerge, for people to feel once again [...] the right to burn all the synagogues they want, to attack boys wearing yarmulkes, to harass large number of rabbis [...] an entirely new discourse way of justifying it must emerge.

Zio, Zio-Nazi and even Zionist are used deceptively by antisemites to promote antisemitism while maintaining plausible deniability. David Duke, the former KKK's Grand Wizard, reportedly invented Zio as an anti-Jewish slur based on Zionism's popularity among contemporary Jews, especially in the United States and United Kingdom. Holocaust historian Yehuda Bauer saw Zio-Nazi as hate speech, while the Meta restricted these terms on Facebook and Instagram.

Yossi Klein Halevi, the author of Letters to My Palestinian Neighbor, considered the trope a transmutation of an archaic dehumanizing motif of Jews:

The deepest source of anti-Israel animus is the symbolization of the Jew as embodiment of evil. The satanic Jew has been replaced by the satanic Jewish state [...] The end of the post-Holocaust era is expressed most starkly in the inversion of the Holocaust [...] The Jew-as-Nazi is the endpoint of political supersessionism: Not only have we forfeited our identity as "Israel," but we've assumed the identity of our worst enemy.

Nevertheless, it is notable that Cold War communist regimes, including the Soviet Union and its puppet state in Poland, had an often neglected history of persecuting their Jewish subjects based on "anti-Zionism".

=== Controlling the Atlantic slave trade ===
Exploiting the pre-existing racial tension between Black and Jewish Americans, antisemites have exaggerated Jews' role in the Atlantic slave trade in an attempt to demonize them in the eyes of Black Americans. The belief that Jews "orchestrated" the Atlantic slave trade is the central tenet of the American Islamist hate group Nation of Islam (NOI), led by Louis Farrakhan. A number of historians, including Saul S. Friedman, conducted research into the matter. Friedman published the book Jews and the American Slave Trade to summarise his findings, concluding that Jewish involvement in the Atlantic slave trade was negligible, thereby disproving the rumour. Also, in 1995, the American Historical Association (AHA) explicitly condemned "any statement alleging that Jews played a disproportionate role in the Atlantic slave trade".

=== Organ harvesting ===
==== Palestinians ====
In August 2009, an article in the Swedish tabloid Aftonbladet accused Israeli troops of harvesting organs from Palestinians who died in their custody. Henrik Bredberg wrote in the rival newspaper Sydsvenskan: "Donald Boström publicized a variant of an anti-Semitic classic, the Jew who abducts children and steals their blood." In a video published on their website on 23 August 2014, Time magazine quoted the 2009 Swedish Aftonbladet's accusation as fact and later on 24 August 2014 retracted the allegations that Israeli soldiers had harvested and sold Palestinian organs. The pro-Israel NGO HonestReporting published an article criticising Time for "giving new life to a horrendous blood libel".

In December 2009, Israel's Channel 2 published an interview with Yehuda Hiss, the former chief pathologist at the Abu Kabir Forensic Institute, where he described participating in the harvesting of skin, corneas, heart valves, and bones from deceased Israelis, Palestinians, and foreign workers without the consent of their families in the 1990s. Officials from the IDF and Israel's health ministry subsequently confirmed that this practice had taken place, but stressed that such activity had ceased in the 1990s. Hiss was removed from his post in 2004, when some details about organ harvesting were first reported, but still worked at the forensic institute. In a state inquiry report, they also found "no evidence that Hiss targeted Palestinians; rather, he seemed to view every human body that ended up in his morgue, whether Israeli or Palestinian, as fair game for organ harvesting.The families of dead Israeli soldiers were among those who complained about Hiss's conduct."

During the ongoing Gaza war, there have been allegations, made by the Gaza Health Ministry, that the IDF has harvested the organs of Palestinians. Euro-Med Human Rights Monitor also expressed "concerns" about possible organ theft from deceased Palestinians. However, these claims not been verified, and remain unsubstantiated.

==== Haiti ====
In the immediate aftermath of the 2010 Haiti earthquake, Israel sent 120 staff, doctors and troops of the Israel Defense Forces (IDF) to Port-au-Prince. The IDF set up a field hospital that performed 316 surgeries and delivered 16 babies. On 18 January, an American "activist" called T. West posted a YouTube video calling on Haitians to be wary of "personalities who are out for money", which he referred to as the Israeli Defense Force (IDF). To explain his allegations, West stated that in the past "the IDF [had] participated in stealing organ transplants of Palestinians and others", thus echoing the Aftonbladet Israel controversy. West, who claimed to speak for a black-empowerment group called AfriSynergy Productions, stopped short of making more explicit accusations against the IDF's behaviour in Haiti but he noted that there was "little monitoring" of it in the quake's aftermath, insinuating that organ theft was at the very least a strong possibility. The Iranian state outlet Press TV promoted the allegations. In a speech on 22 January, Ayatollah Ahmad Khatami said "There have been news reports that the Zionist regime, in the case of the catastrophe of Haiti, and under the pretext of providing relief to the people of Haiti, is stealing the organs of these wretched people", again without citing any evidence. On 27 January, a Syrian TV reporter described T. West's video as "document[ing] this heinous crime and [...] show[ing] Israelis engaged in stealing organs from the earthquake victims" (despite the fact that the video quite evidently does no such thing).

On 1 February 2010, "The Palestine Telegraph" accused the IDF of harvesting organs in Haiti for sale based on the said YouTube video by T. West whose material was re-used from Hezbollah's Al-Manar TV. In the United Kingdom, Baroness Jenny Tonge was removed from her role as Liberal Democrat health spokeswoman as a result of an interview in which she suggested that an independent inquiry should be established. Israeli media and Jewish groups fought back against the claims immediately. In an interview with the Ynetnews, West re-iterated his accusation of IDF's past organ theft and cited Operation Bid Rig as further "evidence" of Jewish "involvement" in organ trafficking. The Anti-Defamation League responded, labeling West's allegations as an antisemitic "Big Lie", while an author for the Jewish Ledger referred to the rumors as a renewed blood libel.

=== 9/11 conspiracy theories ===
Some conspiracy theories hold that Jews or Israel played a key role in carrying out the September 11 attacks. As per a paper published by the Anti-Defamation League (ADL), "anti-Semitic conspiracy theories have not been accepted in mainstream circles in the U.S.", but "this is not the case in the Arab and Muslim world". A claim that 4,000 Jewish employees skipped work at the WTC on 11 September has been widely reported and widely debunked. The number of Jews who died in the attacks – typically estimated at 400 – tracks closely with the proportion of Jews living in the New York area. Five Israelis died in the attack.

In 2003, the ADL published a report which attacked "hateful conspiracy theories" that the 9/11 attacks were carried out by Israelis and Jews, saying that they had the potential to "rationalize and fuel global anti-Semitism". The ADL's report found that "The Big Lie has united the American far-right, white supremacists and the Arab and Muslim world". It also found that many of those were modern manifestations of the Protocols of the Elders of Zion. The ADL has characterized the Jeff Rense website as carrying antisemitic materials, such as "American Jews staged the 9/11 terrorist attacks for their own financial gain and to induce the American people to endorse wars of aggression and genocide on the nations of the Middle East and the theft of their resources for the benefit of Israel". Accusations of Jews masterminding the 9/11 attacks have also been made by the black supremacist New Black Panther Party (NBPP), which have gained traction among anti-Zionist Black Americans.

=== Jews as a separate species ===
A number of fringe researchers, including Stan Gooch and Michael Bradley, have hypothesized that Jews have significantly more Neanderthal ancestry than non-Jews, or even that they are mainly Neanderthal in origin (in contrast to Gentiles who are considered the descendants of Cro-Magnons). These theories have been picked up by antisemitic writers and publications such as Instauration, Willis Carto, and Barnes Review, who claim Jews are a different species locked in an ecological rivalry versus other humans, and that their Neanderthal heritage results in increased aggression and an innate drive to dominate their surroundings. According to this view, both Judaism itself as well as antisemitism are rationalizations for a much older, atavistic conflict between the two populations.

A 2021 paper in an anthropology journal argued that antisemitic caricatures of Jews have consistently depicted them with Neanderthal-like physical traits, even before modern reconstructions of Neanderthal appearance became widely available. The paper suggested that this could be due to a lingering folk memory of anatomically modern human encounters with Neanderthals, which was first preserved through legends and depictions of mythological creatures (e.g. trolls), and later transferred to population groups seen as "other", especially Jews.

Prior to the discovery of Neanderthals, polygenists believed that each "race" was descended from an entirely separate act of creation by God; Jews were frequently listed as one of these "races". Some, but not all, proponents of this view used it to attack Jews.

== Contradictory accusations ==
Various researchers noted the irrational contradictions in antisemitic tropes. Leon Pinsker noted as early as in 1882:

Friend and foe alike have tried to explain or to justify this hatred of the Jews by bringing all sorts of charges against them. They are alleged to have crucified Jesus, to have drunk the blood of Christians, to have poisoned wells, to have taken usury, to have exploited the peasant, and so on. These and a thousand and one other charges against an entire people have been proved groundless. They showed their own weakness in that they had to be trumped up wholesale in order to quiet the evil conscience of the Jew-baiters, to justify the condemnation of an entire nation, to demonstrate the necessity of burning the Jew, or rather the Jewish ghost, at the stake. He who tries to prove too much proves nothing at all. Though the Jews may justly be charged with many shortcomings, those shortcomings are, at all events, not such great vices, not such capital crimes, as to justify the condemnation of the entire people.

In her 2003 book, The Holocaust and Antisemitism: A Short History, Jocelyn Hellig wrote:

Michael Curtis has pointed out the many directly contradictory accusations, claiming that Jews are simultaneously:

- alienated from society but also cosmopolitans
- isolated but also intermingled among other peoples
- individualist but also communal
- capitalist exploiters and international financiers but also revolutionary Marxists
- materialistic but also people of the Book
- militant aggressors but also cowardly pacifists
- arrogant but also timid
- superstitious but also promoters of secularism
- upholders of rigid law but also morally decadent
- a chosen people but also an inferior race
- crucifiers of Christ but also inventors of Christianity

Curtis stated:

no single group of people could feasibly have such a total monopoly on evil.

Gustavo Perednik wrote in Judeophobia:

The Jews were accused by the nationalists of being the creators of Communism; by the Communists of ruling Capitalism. If they live in non-Jewish countries, they are accused of double-loyalties; if they live in the Jewish country, of being racists. When they spend their money, they are reproached for being ostentatious; when they don't spend their money, of being avaricious. They are called rootless cosmopolitans or hardened chauvinists. If they assimilate, they are accused of being fifth-columnists, if they don't, of shutting themselves away.

== Comments about tropes ==
As per defense attorney Kenneth Stern, "Historically, Jews have not fared well around conspiracy theories. Such ideas fuel antisemitism. The myths that all Jews are responsible for the death of Christ, or poisoned wells, or killed Christian children to bake matzos, or 'made up' the Holocaust, or plot to control the world, do not succeed each other; rather, the list of anti-Semitic canards gets longer." Hannah Arendt, in analyzing antisemitism in the first part of The Origins of Totalitarianism, shared a joke:

An antisemite claimed that the Jews had caused the war; the reply was: Yes, the Jews and the bicyclists. Why the bicyclists? asked the one; the other replied: Why the Jews?

== See also ==
- Conspiracy theory
- Expulsions and exoduses of Jews
- False accusation
- Geography of antisemitism
- Islamophobic trope
- Israel and claims of supernatural warfare
- Jewish history
- Moral panic
- New antisemitism
- Persecution of Jews
- Scapegoating
- Stereotypes of Jews
- Timeline of antisemitism
- Timeline of Jewish history
