= Political positions of Marjorie Taylor Greene =

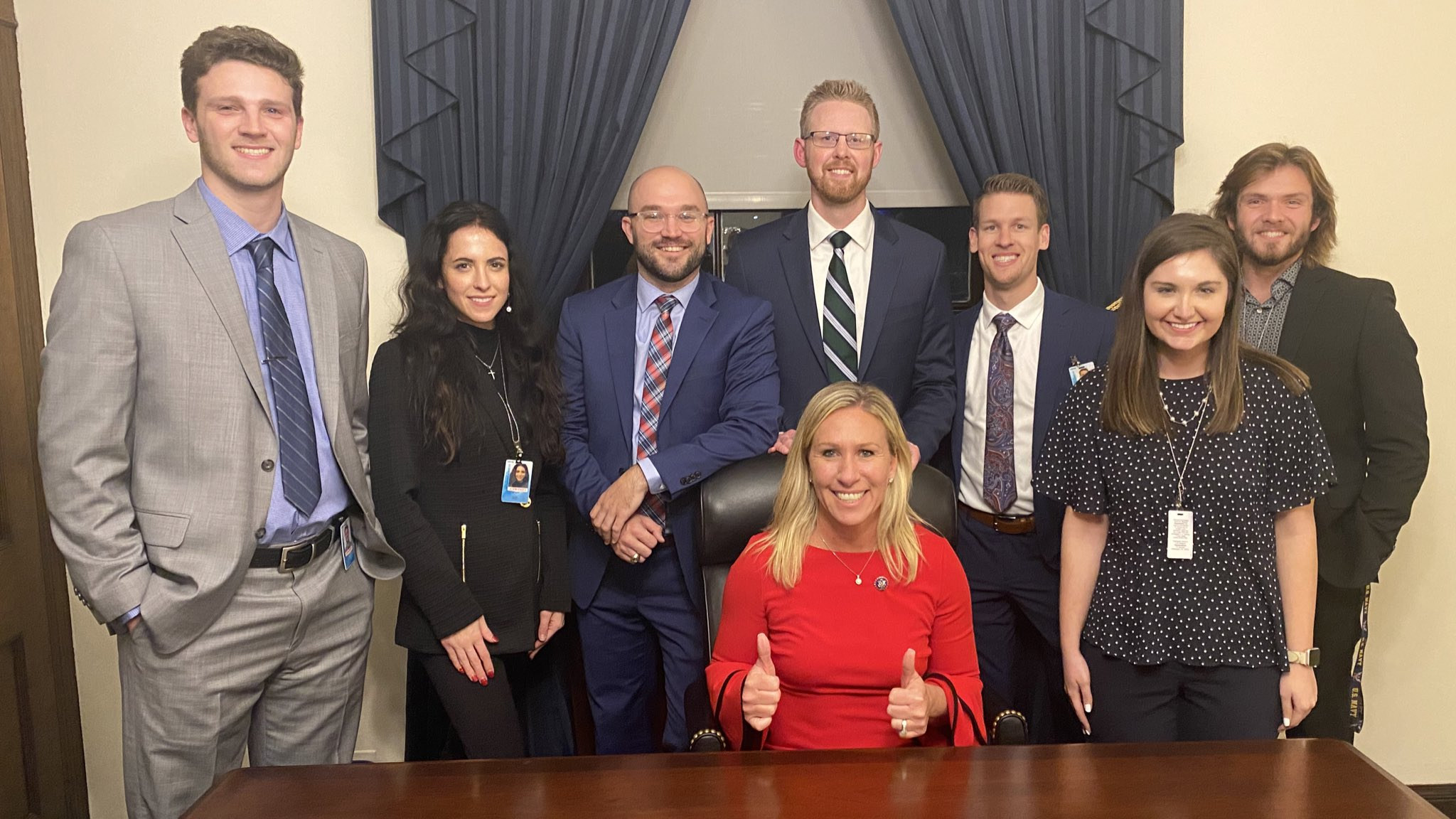
Greene with her congressional office staff, "Team Greene", on her first day in office, January 3, 2021

This article covers the political positions of Marjorie Taylor Greene. After she won the 2020 Republican primary runoff election, Greene wrote on Twitter: "The GOP establishment, the media, & the radical left, spent months & millions of dollars attacking me." She expressed support for Donald Trump and declared her intention to push Republicans further to the right. In June 2026, Greene announced that she had left the Republican Party.

== Abortion ==
Greene opposes abortion, calling it "the worst scar a woman can carry for the rest of her life". In videos apparently recorded between 2017 and 2019, Greene said that abortion and Planned Parenthood are two factors holding back minorities in the country, and in an August 2020 interview with Fox News, she indicated her support for defunding Planned Parenthood. On April 15, 2021, Greene and Boebert cast two lone votes against a bill to reauthorize the National Marrow Donor Program. Explaining her vote, Greene falsely claimed: "Nothing in this bill prevents the funding of aborted fetal tissue by taxpayers." In 2021, Greene falsely claimed that the Plan B contraceptive "kills a baby in the womb"; Plan B actually prevents ovulation and thus prevents pregnancy, instead of terminating a pregnancy.

== COVID-19 ==
In September 2020, Greene wrote on Twitter that "children should not wear masks", calling recommendations by the Centers for Disease Control and Prevention and other public health officials "unhealthy for their psychological, emotional, and educational growth" and "emasculating" for boys. She called restrictions imposed in the U.S. Capitol in response to the COVID-19 pandemic, including face mask requirements, "tyrannical control" by Democrats. She opposed any form of mandatory mask-wearing, compulsory vaccination, or lockdowns in response to the pandemic. After Greene called masks "oppressive", National Institute of Allergy and Infectious Diseases (NIAID) director Anthony Fauci responded that her stance was "very disturbing" given the data on the seriousness of the outbreak. Greene and other Republicans refused to wear masks in a secured room with other members of Congress during the storming of the Capitol in January 2021; afterward, it was reported that several representatives tested positive for the virus, including Bonnie Watson Coleman, Pramila Jayapal, and Brad Schneider.

Greene refused to get a COVID-19 vaccine, stating there was no reason to because she is "perfectly healthy". By March 2021, the private sector had begun efforts to create vaccine passports to better enable those who had been inoculated to resume public gatherings, and some states and the federal government were considering such plans, though the Biden administration said participation would not be compulsory. On Facebook and Twitter, Greene suggested the plan might be "Biden's mark of the beast", a reference to the Book of Revelation, echoing a far-right conspiracy theory that getting vaccinated is equivalent to pledging allegiance to the devil. She added: "It's still fascism, or communism, whatever you want to call it, but it's coming from private companies. So, I have a term for that. I call it 'corporate communism.'" Days later, Greene introduced a bill in the House, the We Will Not Comply Bill, which sought to ban vaccine passports, as well as the Fire Fauci Bill, which would eliminate Fauci's salary until his successor was confirmed by the Senate, although Senate confirmation is not required for Fauci's position as NIAID director. According to August 2021 financial disclosures, in 2020 Greene owned stocks in three COVID-19 vaccine manufacturers, with at least $15,000 of stock in both Pfizer and Johnson & Johnson, and at least $1,000 of stock in AstraZeneca.

Greene has been fined many times for not wearing a mask on the House floor. The first occasion was on May 18, 2021, when she was fined $500. Two days later, on a podcast hosted by evangelical commentator David Brody, Greene called Pelosi "mentally ill" and said that Pelosi's requirement that House members continue wearing masks until they all prove they have been vaccinated "is exactly the [same] type of abuse" as Jews being "put in trains and taken to gas chambers in Nazi Germany" during the Holocaust. Greene said she incurred a second fine of $2,500 after she again entered the House floor without a mask, and she dubbed Pelosi "Speaker Maskhole" in response. The day after the podcast, she defended her comments, adding, "any rational Jewish person doesn't like what's happening with overbearing mask mandates and overbearing vaccine policies." Her comments drew widespread criticism, including from leading Republican representatives and the Jewish community. On June 14, Greene publicly apologized for her comments after a private visit to the Holocaust Museum in Washington, D.C. Three weeks later, she compared Biden's suggestion to provide door-to-door vaccinations to "medical brownshirts" and said: "You can't force people to be part of the human experiment." By the end of October 2021, she had been fined 20 times for not wearing a mask on the House floor. According to House rules, subsequent fines were $2,500 each. Thus, with the 20th occasion, she had been fined a total of $48,000.

On June 4, 2021, Greene sent Biden a letter calling for an investigation into Fauci over his statements on the origin of SARS-CoV-2, the virus that causes COVID-19. In the letter, she called COVID-19 a "manufactured plague" caused by a "Chinese-made virus". Days later, she suggested that only a bioweapon could explain the existence and spread of the virus. Greene also said that she did not support the use of gain-of-function research to identify emerging diseases and develop vaccines and treatments.

In July 2021, Greene dismissed the COVID-19 variants, including the Delta variant, saying, "no one cares". She also posted misinformation about the virus, saying it "is not dangerous for non-obese people and those under 65". When a reporter informed Greene that non-obese and young people were also dying from the virus and asked her whether she bore "responsibility for keeping people in Georgia safe", Greene laughed and said, "I think people's responsibility is their own."

At an August 2021 fundraiser in Alabama, Greene claimed that Biden would be "sending one of his police state friends to your front door" to inquire whether they had received a vaccine, and said, "in the South, we all love our Second Amendment rights, and we're not really big on strangers showing up on our front door." At the same event, Greene claimed that the virus was Fauci's "experiment". When NBC News contacted Greene's office to confirm that a video of the event was genuine, a spokesman for her responded, "These claims are ridiculous and yet another conspiracy theory from the left." On August 12, Greene admitted that COVID-19 was spreading, but falsely said that hospitals were not overwhelmed with afflicted patients, and added, "we're human, we can't live forever, we're going to catch all kinds of diseases and illnesses and other viruses." In November 2022, Greene promoted the anti-vaccine film Died Suddenly, which promotes misinformation about COVID-19 vaccines and Great Reset conspiracy theories. In June 2024, when questioning Fauci at a congressional hearing, Greene repeatedly refused to address Fauci as Doctor, questioned his medical licence and accused him of covering up COVID-19's origins.

== 2020 presidential election ==
Greene is a supporter of President Donald Trump; on January 4, 2021, she called for the results of the 2020 U.S. presidential election in Georgia to be decertified. After Trump's second impeachment, she introduced an article of impeachment against Biden on January 21, the day after he took office; no one co-sponsored it.

During an interview with Steve Bannon on July 7, 2021, Greene rejected a conspiracy theory that suggested Trump would be reinstated as president in August 2021.

On October 22, 2021, Greene purchased shares of Digital World Acquisition Corp., a special purpose acquisition company that had just merged with Trump Media & Technology Group for the purpose of funding Trump's planned social media app, Truth Social.

== Foreign policy ==
During a speech at the 2021 Conservative Political Action Conference, Greene adamantly opposed foreign aid, saying: "We believe our hard-earned tax dollars should just go for America, not for... China, Russia, the Middle East, Guam – whatever, wherever." Guam is a U.S. territory whose residents are U.S. citizens.

In March 2021, Greene was one of 14 House Republicans to vote against a measure condemning the Myanmar coup d'état, for reasons reported to be unclear.

In June 2021, Greene was one of 49 House Republicans to vote to repeal the Authorization for Use of Military Force Against Iraq Resolution of 2002 the following month, she stated that if she had the authority to, she would kick out every Chinese person in the United States who is loyal to the Chinese Communist Party and impose strict tariffs on China. The same month, Greene voted against the bipartisan ALLIES Act, which would increase the number of special immigrant visas for Afghan allies of the U.S. military, while also reducing some application requirements.

In 2023, Greene was among 47 Republicans to vote in favor of H.Con.Res. 21, which directed President Biden to remove U.S. troops from Syria within 180 days.

=== Russia and Ukraine ===
Throughout the Russo–Ukrainian War, Greene has promoted Russian propaganda, including claims that Ukraine is a Nazi state, and praised Vladimir Putin. During the Russian invasion of Ukraine, she criticized the "corrupt" Ukrainian government and argued against supplying Ukraine with weapons. She has suggested that Ukraine instigated the invasion by agitating Russia. In 2024, Greene proposed an amendment to a House foreign aid bill on Ukraine that would require all members of the House voting in favor of the bill to enlist in the Ukrainian military. Former Republican congressman Ken Buck has called Greene "Moscow Marjorie", due to her "getting her talking points from the Kremlin". Greene has called for the lifting of U.S. sanctions on Russia.

Greene has been critical of NATO. She was one of 18 Republicans to vote against admitting Sweden and Finland to NATO.

=== Israel and Palestine ===
In October 2023, Greene sponsored a resolution to censure Democratic U.S. representative Rashida Tlaib for alleged "antisemitic activity" and "sympathizing" with Hamas. During the Twelve-Day War, Greene expressed skepticism that Iran was developing nuclear weapons, saying "We've been told that for the past 20 years", and stating that "Americans don't want to bomb Iran" for "the secular government of Israel". After the American strikes on Iranian nuclear sites, Greene stated that "this is not our fight" and criticized their rationale, noting that "there would not be bombs falling on the people of Israel if Netanyahu had not dropped bombs on the people of Iran first." Greene supported efforts to cut military funding for Israel’s missile defense system, stating, "Israel bombed the Catholic Church in Gaza, and that entire population is being wiped out as they continue their aggressive war in Gaza".

In July 2025, she became the first Republican to call the situation in Gaza a "genocide", after she posted a tweet on Twitter condemning Israel's conduct in Gaza. On July 18, Greene proposed a defense appropriations amendment that would end U.S. funding of Israel's Iron Dome and was one of six members of the house who voted in favor of the amendment. On July 27, she posted on X, "I can unequivocally say that what happened to innocent people in Israel on Oct 7th was horrific. Just as I can unequivocally say that what has been happening to innocent people and children in Gaza is horrific. This war and humanitarian crisis must end!" She also condemned her colleague, Randy Fine, for openly celebrating the starvation and bombing of Palestinians.

=== Iran ===
Greene has argued Trump started the 2026 Iran war as a distraction from ongoing disclosures relating to the Epstein pedophile network.

== Healthcare ==
In October 2025, Greene broke with her party over the federal government shutdown. The disagreement was over a proposed extension of Obamacare subsidies. She expressed strong opposition to the Affordable Care Act as well as high health insurance premiums.

== Opioid epidemic in the United States ==
In May 2023, Greene said that lax security at the Mexico–United States border contributed to the opioid epidemic in the United States, stating, "Three hundred Americans are dying every single day. Mayorkas, and I argue Biden as well — President Biden — both of them should be impeached for that."

== Gun rights ==
At a September 2020 gun rights rally in Ringgold, Georgia, Greene said she would always protect gun owners' rights and would not vote for any laws making it harder for people to possess guns. She said: "The government will never tell me how many guns I can own, and how many bullets I am allowed to fire if someone were to attack me or my kids".

In January 2021, a 2019 video resurfaced showing Marjorie Taylor Greene confronting Parkland shooting survivor David Hogg near the U.S. Capitol. Greene followed Hogg, questioning his gun control activism and calling him a "coward" for ignoring her. She also falsely claimed his efforts were funded by billionaire George Soros. Greene defended her actions, but the video sparked backlash, with Parkland activists, including Fred Guttenberg, calling for her resignation. Hogg described the encounter as intimidating, especially when Greene mentioned carrying a firearm. The controversy resurfaced alongside reports that Greene had previously engaged with social media posts endorsing political violence.

In June 2021, Greene introduced a bill to abolish the Bureau of Alcohol, Tobacco, Firearms, and Explosives. The bill also sought to provide monetary grants to the families of Border Patrol agents killed as a result of Operation Fast and Furious.

In June 2022, Greene argued that Canada's proposed gun control laws would leave Canada "weak and vulnerable to being invaded and easily taken over by another stronger country", such as "Russia, who is very angry at America right now."

In July 2022, Greene said that the July 4 Highland Park parade shooting was "designed to make Republicans go along with more gun control" because the shooting occurred "in a rich, white neighborhood". She also said that "We didn't see that at all the Pride parades in the month of June" and that "As soon as we hit MAGA month ... we have shootings on July Fourth". Although Greene conceded that her comments might sound "like a conspiracy theory", she said that "the definition of a right-wing conspiracy theory" is "just the news a month early".

== Infrastructure ==
In November 2021, Greene said that any Republican who supported the Infrastructure Investment and Jobs Act was "a traitor to our party, a traitor to their voters and a traitor to our donors". She called the $1.2 trillion bill Biden's "communist takeover of America". Greene criticized the 13 House Republicans who voted for the bill as "American job and energy killers" and derided them as "China-First and America-Last". Fred Upton, one of the 13, said that he received over 1,000 calls, including death threats, after Greene publicized their office phone numbers on Twitter.

== LGBT issues ==
On February 2, 2021, Greene co-sponsored the Old Glory Only Bill, a bill to ban U.S. embassies from flying pride flags. Two days later, she said she was "censored" by Twitter for "absolutely believing with all my heart that God's creation is he created them male and female".

On February 24, 2021, Greene tried to block the Equality Act while it was being debated on the House floor, saying that it would "destroy God's creation" and "violate everything we hold dear in God's creation". She proposed replacing it with a bill that would exempt nonprofit organizations, allow people to sue the federal government "if their religious rights are violated", and prevent trans women and girls from participating in women's sports. After floor debate on the bill that day, Representative Marie Newman, whose congressional office is directly across from Greene's, displayed a transgender pride flag outside her office. In response, Greene displayed a transphobic poster outside her office reading: "There are TWO genders: Male & Female. Trust The Science!". Newman has a transgender daughter, whom Greene called Newman's "biological son".

In April 2021, Greene supported a bill by Representative Mary Miller that would bar schools from allowing transgender students to use facilities such as bathrooms and locker rooms that correspond to their gender identity.

In June 2021, during an interview with Steve Bannon, Greene called transgender women "men playing dress up" and "literally having an identity crisis", saying, "They never will be [women], and I refuse to recognize them that way." Later in June, she said that schools teaching about LGBT people is "mental/emotional child abuse".

In April 2022, Greene criticized Ketanji Brown Jackson for not answering Senator Marsha Blackburn's question "what is a woman?" Greene said, "We came from Adam's rib. God created us with his hands. We may be the weaker sex, we are the weaker sex, but we are our partner's, our husband's wife."

In May 2022, Greene claimed that straight people would go extinct within less than two centuries due to LGBT-inclusive educators, calling them "trans terrorists". She also falsely claimed that the perpetrator of the 2022 Robb Elementary School shooting in Texas was transgender.

On June 1, 2022, Greene said that "an entire" pride month celebrating LGBT people "needs to end".

On August 19, 2022, Greene introduced the "Protect Children's Innocence Act", which would make giving gender-affirming care to transgender youth a felony punishable by up to 25 years in prison, prohibit using federal funds for gender-affirming care or health insurance covering it, and prohibit institutions of higher education from providing instruction on such care. Fourteen Republicans have co-sponsored the bill. In November 2022, after California state senator Scott Wiener, who is gay, called "groomer" "an anti-LGBTQ hate word" that "plays into the slander that LGBTQ people are pedophiles", Greene responded that the Protect Children's Innocence Act would stop "communist groomers" such as Wiener.

On December 17, 2025, an updated version of Greene's "Protect Children's Innocence Act" introduced in May 2025, H.R. 3492, passed the House by a vote of 216–211.

== Race and religion ==
Greene opposes the Black Lives Matter movement and has called it a Marxist group. In a video, she compared Black Lives Matter activists to white nationalist participants at the August 2017 Unite the Right rally in Charlottesville, Virginia, a rally she had previously called an "inside job". She ended one of her videos commenting: "The most mistreated group of people in the United States today are white males." After the murder of George Floyd, Greene posted on Facebook that his death "must be investigated and justice will be served", calling the video "heartbreaking". One year later, when Derek Chauvin was found guilty of Floyd's murder, Greene said the verdict was a result of jury intimidation by Black Lives Matter – which she compared to the Ku Klux Klan and called "the most powerful domestic terrorist organization" in the United States – and falsely asserted that Washington, D.C. was "completely dead" on the night of the verdict because people were "scared to go out" for "fear of riots". Greene denounced the George Floyd Justice in Policing Act, a civil rights and police reform bill, as an "Anti-Police bill", erroneously claiming it would bar law enforcement from using facial recognition.

In a recording obtained by Politico, Greene said that Muslims who believe in Sharia law should not be in the U.S. government. She also contended that the Democratic Party is holding Black Americans as "slaves". Her comments on black people, Muslims, and Jews were denounced by Republican House leaders and a spokesman for National Republican Congressional Committee chairman Tom Emmer. Greene said that the election of Omar and Tlaib in the 2018 midterm elections was part of "an Islamic invasion of our government", and in 2021, she called the Squad supporters of "terrorism" and "Hamas" who "don't belong in Congress" and referred to them as the "Jihad Squad". In a late January 2021 interview with far-right British political commentator Katie Hopkins, Greene said that she would "love to trade [Hopkins] for some of our white people here that have no appreciation for our country".

On April 16, 2021, it was reported that Greene and other House Republicans, such as Gaetz, Louie Gohmert, and Paul Gosar, were interested in launching an America First Caucus, and Gohmert confirmed Greene's involvement to reporters. According to a leaked seven-page document on the aims of the caucus, they believe that "America is a nation with a border, and a culture, strengthened by a common respect for uniquely Anglo-Saxon political traditions." The document also stated the caucus would "work towards an infrastructure that reflects the architectural, engineering and aesthetic value that befits the progeny of European architecture". House Republican leader Kevin McCarthy indirectly criticized the caucus as pushing "nativist dog whistles". Greene's office said on April 16 that the new caucus would be launched "very soon", but the next day her spokesman said it was still in an early planning stage and that Greene was not "launching anything". Greene disavowed the caucus and stated she was not involved, calling it a "staff level draft proposal from an outside group that [she] hadn't read".

In February 2022, Senate minority leader Mitch McConnell criticized Greene for attending the America First Political Action Conference, saying there was no place in the party for "white supremacists or anti-Semitism".

Greene has defended Christian nationalism and described herself as a "proud Christian nationalist".

== Climate change and weather events ==
"Fossil fuels are natural and amazing"

"We live on a spinning planet that rotates around a much bigger sun along with other planets and heavenly bodies rotating around the sun that all create gravitational pull on one another while our galaxy rotates and travels through the universe. Considering all of that, yes our climate will change, and it's totally normal!"

— Tweet of April 15, 2023

Greene rejects the scientific consensus that climate change is caused primarily by human activity, saying in 2021 that "maybe perhaps we live on a ball that rotates around the sun, that flies through the universe, and maybe our climate just changes." In an August 2022 interview, Greene said, "People die in the cold. This Earth warming, and carbon, is actually healthy for us. It helps us to feed people, it keeps people alive. ... We need to hold Democrats accountable and defund all of their climate garbage"—contrary to the scientific consensus that the costs of climate change are likely to be significant and to increase over time. Greene's April 15, 2023, tweet said climate change was a "scam" and that "fossil fuels are natural and amazing", saying that "there are some very powerful people that are getting rich beyond their wildest dreams convincing many that carbon is the enemy". Her tweet included a chart that omitted carbon dioxide and methane, the two most dominant greenhouse gas emissions.

In October 2024 after Hurricane Helene caused destruction in several American states, Greene posted online "a map of hurricane affected areas with an overlay of electoral map by political party shows how hurricane devastation could affect the election", showing many Republican-leaning areas affected, then she wrote later that day: "Yes they can control the weather … It's ridiculous for anyone to lie and say it can't be done."

== Evolution ==
Greene has said that she does not accept the scientific consensus of evolution, calling it a "type of so-called science" and saying: "I don't believe in evolution. I believe in God."

== Secession ==
In late 2021, Greene advocated a "national divorce" between red states and blue states. She further suggested that red states disenfranchise people who move there from blue states for a period of five years. She repeated these suggestions in February 2023, to the condemnation of Democrats and some Republicans, including Spencer Cox, Liz Cheney, and Mitt Romney. The next day, Greene elaborated that she wants "a legal agreement" that would separate states more than they are now "while maintaining our legal union".

== Political violence and extremism ==
In an interview with gun activist Chris Dorr on October 27, 2020, a week before election day, Greene told viewers: "the only way you get your freedoms back is it's earned with the price of blood." On January 29, 2021, The New York Times detailed Greene's support for and past ties with extremist militia groups, including the Three Percenters and the Oath Keepers; both groups had members participate in the 2021 attack on the U.S. Capitol.

=== Rhetoric involving killing of opponents ===
In a January 2019 Facebook video, Greene said Pelosi is guilty of treason and that treason is a crime punishable by death. Greene made the video to promote a petition she started on We the People to impeach Pelosi for treason — a remedy that does not exist in the U.S. Constitution — due to her opposition to Trump's proposed border wall, as well as alleged support for sanctuary city policies. More than 140,000 people signed the petition. In February 2019 videos live-streamed on Facebook, Greene visited Pelosi's office and suggested that Pelosi would either be killed or imprisoned for treason. She then suggested that Representative Maxine Waters had also committed treason.

In 2018 and 2019, Greene's Facebook account expressed support for the execution of leading Democrats, including Pelosi, Barack Obama, and Hillary Clinton, as well as support for the execution of FBI agents. For example, in response to an April 2018 post asking, "Now do we get to hang them?? Meaning H & O???", Greene's account responded: "Stage is being set. Players are being put in place. We must be patient. This must be done perfectly or liberal judges would let them off." Greene did not deny the authenticity of the reported content, but stated that the CNN article was "focused on my time before running for political office", that "teams of people manage my pages", and that CNN had reported on content that "did not represent my views".

== Advocacy based on conspiracy theories ==
After the first round of voting in the 2020 Republican primary election, but before the Republican primary runoff election, Politico rereleased videos Greene published in which she expressed racist, antisemitic, and Islamophobic views. Her support for bigotry and the QAnon conspiracy theory in the videos were condemned, including by conservatives, such as McCarthy and Republican whip Steve Scalise, but they took no action against her, with McCarthy remaining neutral in the runoff. Some of Greene's social media postings and publications remained online through her 2020 campaign. After they drew attention in January 2021, she deleted them.

Greene has promoted multiple conspiracy theories, including the claim that Hillary Clinton is responsible for a series of murders, that Democratic Party elites are responsible for a satanic child sex trafficking ring, that the government orchestrated the 2017 Las Vegas shooting, that the Stoneman Douglas High School shooting in Parkland, Florida, was a false flag attack intended to help introduce gun control, that the Sandy Hook Elementary School shooting was staged, that Barack Obama secretly visited North Korea and sabotaged nuclear diplomacy to cover up untoward dealings with Iran, that Obama and his advisor Valerie Jarrett were secretly Muslim, and that the September 11 attack on the Pentagon was fake. Greene also promoted a false anti-Semitic conspiracy theory that the 2018 Camp Fire, a deadly wildfire in California, may have been caused by "what looked like lasers or beams of blue light" from "space solar generators" in a scheme involving California Governor Jerry Brown, companies PG&E, Rothschild & Co, and Solaren.

In May 2022, using a malapropism, Greene promoted the conspiracy theory that the U.S. government is planning to force Americans to eat fake meat grown in a "peach tree dish" by Bill Gates.

In August 2022, Greene said that Democrats had designed the killing of Ayman al-Zawahiri to boost Biden in the midterms because the Russian invasion of Ukraine had not achieved this, shortly before doubting he had been killed.

=== Pizzagate and QAnon ===
Greene has said there are links between Hillary Clinton and pedophilia and human sacrifice and in 2017 speculated that the Pizzagate conspiracy theory is real. Reviving the Clinton kill list conspiracy theory, she claimed Clinton murdered her political enemies. In a video posted to YouTube in 2018, Greene suggested John F. Kennedy Jr.'s death in a plane crash in 1999 was a "Clinton murder" because he was a possible rival to her for a U.S. Senate election in New York.

In January 2021, Media Matters found a 2018 Facebook post that showed Greene agreeing with a conspiracy theory known as Frazzledrip, which asserts that there is a video of Hillary Clinton and her assistant Huma Abedin murdering a child in a satanic ritual and that Clinton later ordered a hit on a police officer to cover it up. Greene dismissed Media Matters' findings as the work of "Communists [sic] bloggers".

Greene supported the debunked far-right QAnon conspiracy theory, which she discovered through columnist Liz Crokin. In a 2017 video, she said that "many of the things" said on 4chan by the eponymous Q — whom she called a "patriot" — "have really proven to be true". She said, "There's a once-in-a-lifetime opportunity to take this global cabal of Satan-worshipping pedophiles out, and I think we have the president to do it."

According to her author biography page, Greene wrote 59 articles for the now-defunct conspiracy theory website American Truth Seekers, including one linking the Democratic Party to "Child Sex, Satanism, and the Occult". When she ran for the House of Representatives in 2020, she distanced herself from that conspiracy theory and said she had not referred to Q or QAnon during her campaign. She said she no longer had a connection with QAnon and mentioned having found misinformation. During a November 2025 appearance on The View, Greene said of QAnon: "I was a victim, just like you were, of social media lies and stuff you read on social media."

=== False flag claims ===
In a 2017 video posted to Facebook, Greene expressed doubt that the perpetrator of the 2017 Las Vegas shooting, a large-scale incident she believes was intended as an attack on the right to bear arms, acted alone. She claimed that the August 2017 Charlottesville white nationalist rally, in which a counter-protester was killed in a car attack, was an "inside job". She said the 2019 Christchurch mosque shootings in New Zealand were a false flag for the same end.

In a 2018 interview, Greene expressed support for a conspiracy theory that a plane did not hit the Pentagon during the September 11 attacks; she referred to "the so-called plane that crashed into the Pentagon" and said that "it's odd there's never any evidence shown for a plane in the Pentagon", despite an abundance of evidence. On another occasion, at a conservative conference in 2018, Greene said 9/11 was part of a U.S. government plot. Following an August 2020 Media Matters report on her comments, Greene wrote on Twitter: "Some people claimed a missile hit the Pentagon. I now know that is not correct." She has also claimed that Democratic National Committee staff member Seth Rich was murdered by the MS-13 gang on Obama's behalf. According to Greene, Obama is secretly a Muslim; in actuality, he is a Christian.

In a February 2019 interview, Greene suggested that Supreme Court Justice Ruth Bader Ginsburg had been replaced in public appearances by a body double. A QAnon-related conspiracy theory claimed that Ginsburg had died years earlier and that Democrats used a body double to conceal her death so they could hold onto her Supreme Court seat during Trump's presidency. Ginsburg actually died on September 18, 2020, during Trump's presidency, and Trump appointed Amy Coney Barrett as her successor.

=== Shootings ===
In a 2018 Facebook post found by Media Matters in January 2021, Greene claimed that the 2018 Stoneman Douglas High School shooting in Parkland, Florida, was an organized false flag operation. In another post, she claimed that the 2012 Sandy Hook Elementary School shooting was also a false flag operation. In another Facebook post later in 2018 she wrote: "I am told that Nancy Pelosi tells Hillary Clinton several times a month that 'we need another school shooting' in order to persuade the public to want strict gun control." Parkland shooting survivors such as David Hogg and Cameron Kasky, as well as Fred Guttenberg, whose daughter was killed in the Parkland shooting, condemned Greene's remarks and demanded that she resign from Congress. Greene called Hogg, who advocates gun control, "#littleHitler" and, in a 2019 interview with a gun-rights group, denounced him as an "idiot" who is trained "like a dog". A March 2019 video shows Greene following and taunting Hogg, accusing him of using children for his cause. After the encounter, she called him a "coward" and falsely claimed he is funded by George Soros. The website Snopes found the video uploaded by Guttenberg and others was the second incident in which Greene targeted Hogg. Both occurred on March 25, 2019, and Greene live-streamed the first to her Facebook account. The second video was uploaded to Greene's YouTube account in January 2020.

In January 2021, a Greene staffer threatened to have WRCB-TV reporter Meredith Aldis arrested after Aldis tried to ask Greene a question at a town hall event about her harassment of Hogg.

Soon after these comments came to light, Representative Jahana Hayes, whose district includes Sandy Hook, circulated a letter to the House Republican leadership urging them not to seat Greene on the Education Committee. Hogg called for Greene to be expelled from Congress, saying that Speaker McCarthy tacitly supported Greene by not taking actions to sanction her.

In the aftermath of the Robb Elementary School shooting in May 2022, Greene said that the shooter had engaged in cross-dressing, echoing similar claims by right-wing politicians and media figures that the shooter was transgender. Greene went on to claim without evidence that the shooter was in the same Discord server as the teen accused of carrying out the 2022 Buffalo shooting and that there was a third party who "groomed" both young men. She added that there were suggestions that this groomer was a former FBI agent.

=== Georgia Guidestones bombing ===
Greene has criticized the presence of the Georgia Guidestones, a 19-foot (5.8 m) high megalithic granite monument installed in Elberton in 1982, an attraction that drew 20,000 annual visitors. In an interview with InfoWars conspiracist Alex Jones on July 7, 2022, the day they were dynamited by unknown saboteurs, she said ecumenical texts inscribed on it represented a nefarious future of "population control" as envisioned by the "hard left". She added, "There is a war of good and evil going on, and people are done with globalism".

=== White genocide conspiracy theory ===
In 2018, Greene shared a video, With Open Gates: The Forced Collective Suicide of European Nations repeating the antisemitic white genocide conspiracy theory that Zionists are conspiring to flood Europe with migrants to replace the native white populations. The video, uncovered by Media Matters, said that those supporting refugees are using "immigrant pawns" to commit "the biggest genocide in human history". In sharing the video, Greene wrote that: "This is what the UN wants all over the world". The white genocide conspiracy theory has been associated with white supremacy and espouses the unsubstantiated belief that white people, in a "Great Replacement", will eventually become a minority in Europe and North America due to declining white birth rates and high rates of immigration. Greene has also falsely called George Soros — a Jewish businessman and Holocaust survivor — a Nazi. She promoted the conspiracy theory that Soros' family collaborated with the Nazis in Hungary and is "trying to continue what was not finished".

=== Camp Fire conspiracy theory ===
In 2018, Greene's Facebook account shared a conspiracy theory about the Camp Fire, a deadly Californian wildfire, suggesting that it could have been caused by "what looked like lasers or beams of blue light" from "space solar generators" in a scheme involving California governor Jerry Brown, companies PG&E, Rothschild & Co, and Solaren. For these comments, Greene was condemned by the Republican Jewish Coalition, the Conference of Presidents of Major American Jewish Organizations, and Christians United for Israel, with the latter group stating that Greene had promoted "wild anti-Semitic conspiracy theories". Meanwhile, Representative Jimmy Gomez and the Jewish Democratic Council of America called for Greene to be expelled from Congress.

Solaren, a solar energy company, noted several fundamental defects in the conspiracy theory. Solaren said that its space-based solar power system did not beam power using the visible light part of the electromagnetic spectrum, and so could not be observed as the "blue beams of light" referenced by the theory; that the system does not use lasers, and so could not have "laser beams"; that Solaren's power contract with PG&E ended in 2015; and that by 2021, Solaren had not launched any solar power satellites into space at all. Thus they had not had one in space in 2018.

== Catholic Church leadership ==
On April 28, 2022, in an interview with the Catholic advocacy group Church Militant, Greene criticized the United States Conference of Catholic Bishops, accusing them of "destroying" America with their work regarding immigrants and refugees and claiming that Satan was "controlling the church". Her statement was widely condemned by both Democrats and Republicans. Catholic League president Bill Donohue called Greene a "disgrace" and demanded that Congress sanction her. He added, "Greene has a history of offending African Americans and Jews, so bigotry is something that is apparently baked into her". Her attack was compared with other instances of anti-Catholicism in the United States.

Greene was baptized, raised, and married as a member of the Roman Catholic Church, but stopped attending Catholic mass services in reaction to Catholic Church sexual abuse cases. Greene was rebaptized in 2011 into North Point Community Church, an evangelical megachurch network based in Alpharetta, in a baptism published in an online video.

In response to Donohue's statement, Greene released a statement detailing her decision to leave the Church upon her realization that she "could not trust the Church leadership to protect my children from pedophiles and that they harbored monsters even in their own ranks". She said that her criticisms were limited to Church leadership and did not apply to lay Catholics.

On April 21, 2025 (Easter Monday), the Camerlengo of the Holy Roman Church announced the death of Pope Francis. Greene sparked controversy when she celebrated the pope's death mere hours after the announcement, tweeting, "Today there were major shifts in global leaderships. Evil is being defeated by the hand of God."

== Responses ==
=== Within Congress ===
Democrats have condemned Greene's incendiary statements and promotion of conspiracy theories. Representative Debbie Wasserman Schultz introduced a motion to remove Greene from her committee assignments, saying that Greene's behavior is "appalling" and "has helped fuel domestic terrorism, endangered lives of her colleagues and brought shame on the entire House of Representatives". On February 1, 2021, House majority leader Steny Hoyer gave McCarthy and other Republican House leaders an ultimatum: unless they stripped Greene of her committee seats within 72 hours, the Democrats would bring Wasserman Schultz's motion before the full House. In turn, McCarthy called some of Greene's comments "deeply disturbing".

With Republican officials under mounting pressure to denounce Greene, Senate Minority Leader Mitch McConnell issued a statement to The Hill in which he attacked "loony lies and conspiracy theories" as a "cancer for the Republican Party". The statement did not name Greene, but reporting described the statement as "unmistakably about" and "clearly targeted" at Greene. McConnell confirmed it the following day, referring to his comments on Greene and adding: "I think I adequately spoke out about how I feel". His statement said: "Somebody who's suggested that perhaps no airplane hit the Pentagon on 9/11, that horrifying school shootings were pre-staged, and that the Clintons crashed JFK Jr.'s airplane is not living in reality." In response, Greene tweeted that the Republican Party's only problem are "weak Republicans who only know how to lose gracefully". After McConnell's statement, several other Republican senators voiced criticisms of Greene. Mitt Romney said that the Republican Party's "big tent is not large enough to both accommodate conservatives and kooks". Kevin Cramer said that he would have "a hard time supporting ... [Greene] being on the Education Committee" in the light of "her positions on the school shootings being staged", adding: "Real authority has moral authority." Both Florida senators condemned the idea that the Stoneman Douglas High School shooting might have not have been real; Marco Rubio said that anyone arguing it was a false flag is "either deranged or a sadist". Greene used the criticism for a fundraising push, saying, "Democrats are trying to expel me from Congress" and telling her supporters to "StandWithMTG".

McCarthy met with Greene on February 2 and then held meetings with the House GOP Steering Committee, which is responsible for committee assignments for Republican members of the House. No decision was made that day, but Greene was a major topic of discussion for the Republican Congressional Caucus meeting on February 3, along with the fate of Representative Liz Cheney after her vote in favor of Trump's second impeachment. Greene retained Trump's support, which presented McCarthy with the problem of having to manage the expectations of the Republican Party's various factions in dealing with Cheney and Greene.

==== Removal from House Committee assignments ====
As controversy grew about her previous comments, Greene removed her old social media posts and spoke before the House Republican Conference on February 3, 2021, to state that her social media content did not reflect who she is, prompting a standing ovation. In lieu of total removal from her assignments, McCarthy stated that he had suggested Greene be moved to the Small Business Committee. That day, the Democratic-controlled House Rules Committee passed Wasserman Schultz's motion to remove Greene from her committee assignments. McCarthy indicated his conference would not act against Greene. Pelosi chastised McCarthy for acquiescing to Greene, referring to him as "McCarthy (Q-CA)", in reference to the QAnon conspiracy theory. On February 4, the full House voted to remove Greene from her committee assignments. The vote was 230 to 199, with 11 Republicans joining all the Democrats. After the vote, Greene described herself as "freed", calling the committees part of "basically a tyrannically controlled government".

==== House Speaker removal efforts ====
On May 8, 2024, Greene's efforts to unseat Republican Mike Johnson as House speaker failed. The vote to remove lost by a vote of 359 to 43. Seven Democrats voted "present".

=== Outside Congress ===
The Conference of Presidents of Major American Jewish Organizations and the Republican Jewish Coalition condemned Greene's statements.

On February 9, 2021, Shaun Holmes, the father of a 10-year-old boy with Down syndrome, confronted Greene at a Whitfield County Republican Party meeting. Asked about her use of the word "retard" to refer to individuals with the syndrome, Greene said: "I guess it was a slang word. You can actually look it up in the dictionary", adding: "I do apologize for that being offensive to anyone."

In February 2021, CrossFit attempted to distance itself from Greene, who once owned an affiliated gym and is an avid proponent of CrossFit fitness regimens. CrossFit spokesperson Andrew Weinstein told BuzzFeed News: "CrossFit supports respectful fact-based political dialogue to address our common challenges, and we strongly oppose the loathsome and dangerous lies attributed to Ms. Greene."

On May 21, 2021, Common Cause filed an FEC complaint against Greene for an alleged violation of McCain–Feingold campaign finance provisions, accusing her of "implicit" unlawful solicitation of unlimited contributions in an advertisement appearance made on behalf of a super PAC that targeted Senators Raphael Warnock and Jon Ossoff. In the ad, she calls on viewers to "fight back now, before it's too late" before a separate voice-over asks them to contribute to the PAC seconds thereafter.

During her 2020 campaign and the beginning of her first term in Congress, Greene became one of the most recognizable names in the GOP. On January 29, 2021, Greene stated she had raised $1.6 million amid criticism from Democratic lawmakers. In a February 2021 poll by YouGov, shortly after her removal from her committee assignments, 45% of surveyed adult U.S. citizens viewed her unfavorably, 33% did not know, and 21% viewed her favorably. In a mid-May 2021 poll by Morning Consult, the majority of GOP voters surveyed had either never heard of or had no opinion on Greene; among those who had an opinion, Greene was seen overall more favorably than unfavorably. As of July 2021, opinions on Greene among her constituents in the 14th district are split.

In his 2021 memoir, former New Jersey governor Chris Christie, a Republican, denounced Greene for her "baseless, factless, absurd, and dangerous" rhetoric, including her support of QAnon.

In 2022, the White House criticized Greene for attacking its student loan forgiveness program, calling her hypocritical since she accepted forgiveness of a $183,504 loan from the Paycheck Protection Program.

==== Twitter ====
Greene's Twitter accounts have been suspended and locked many times for violating Twitter's policies. Her Twitter account was temporarily suspended five times in 2021, from manual reviews or automated systems. Her personal account was permanently suspended for spreading COVID-19 vaccine misinformation; her official congressional account remains active. Her personal account was reinstated in November 2022, weeks after Elon Musk acquired Twitter.

Greene's personal Twitter account was locked for 12 hours on January 17, 2021, "for multiple violations of our civic integrity policy". Twitter's action was based on a company policy it had used to remove thousands of QAnon-related accounts after the storming of the United States Capitol. Before the suspension, Greene's posts included false claims about voting fraud and statements blaming electoral officials in Georgia for their failure to act on such claims. Upon returning to Twitter, she criticized the company: "Contrary to how highly you think of yourself and your moral platitude, you are not the judge of humanity. God is."

As of March 19, 2021, Greene was barred from blocking anyone on her public Twitter or any other social media account while in office and was forced to pay $10,000 to cover legal fees for MeidasTouch, whose co-founder says it will donate the money to two nonprofit organizations. This resulted from an out-of-court settlement between Greene and MeidasTouch after MeidasTouch sued Greene for violating the political action committee's First Amendment rights when she blocked it from posting on her Twitter page.

In July 2022, Twitter labeled two tweets by Greene, in which she misgendered and deadnamed Assistant Secretary for Health Rachel Levine, as violating their rules on hateful conduct, but did not delete them, saying it believed it was in the public's interest for the tweets to remain accessible. Later, in January 2025, Greene targeted and misgendered congresswoman Sarah McBride in a series of tweets, labeling her a "groomer".

==== 2022 primary ballot challenges ====
In early 2022, Greene said that under a provision of a state law, several Georgia electors had filed papers seeking to remove her from the 2022 Republican primary ballot as unqualified for office. Electors alleged she had been involved in assisting the 2021 United States Capitol attack. On April 1, 2022, Greene filed a federal lawsuit in which she vigorously denied the allegations and sought to have the law blocked as unconstitutional. The law allows a candidate to be removed from a ballot after review by an administrative law judge and the Georgia Secretary of State. A federal judge denied her challenge on April 18, requiring her to give evidence four days later. She testified for three hours on April 22. On May 6, the judge ruled that she was eligible for reelection, but the final decision belongs to Georgia secretary of state Brad Raffensperger.

==== 2026 Iran war ====
Following the war between Iran and the US in February 2026, Marjorie Taylor Greene criticized Trump for his military operations in Iran, saying that Trump betrayed his campaign promises of "no more foreign wars" and "no more regime change." Greene rejected the administration’s rationale for the attack on Iran and expressed her concern about Trump’s mental condition.
