= Yossi Klein Halevi =

American-born Israeli author and journalist

- יוסי קליין הלוי
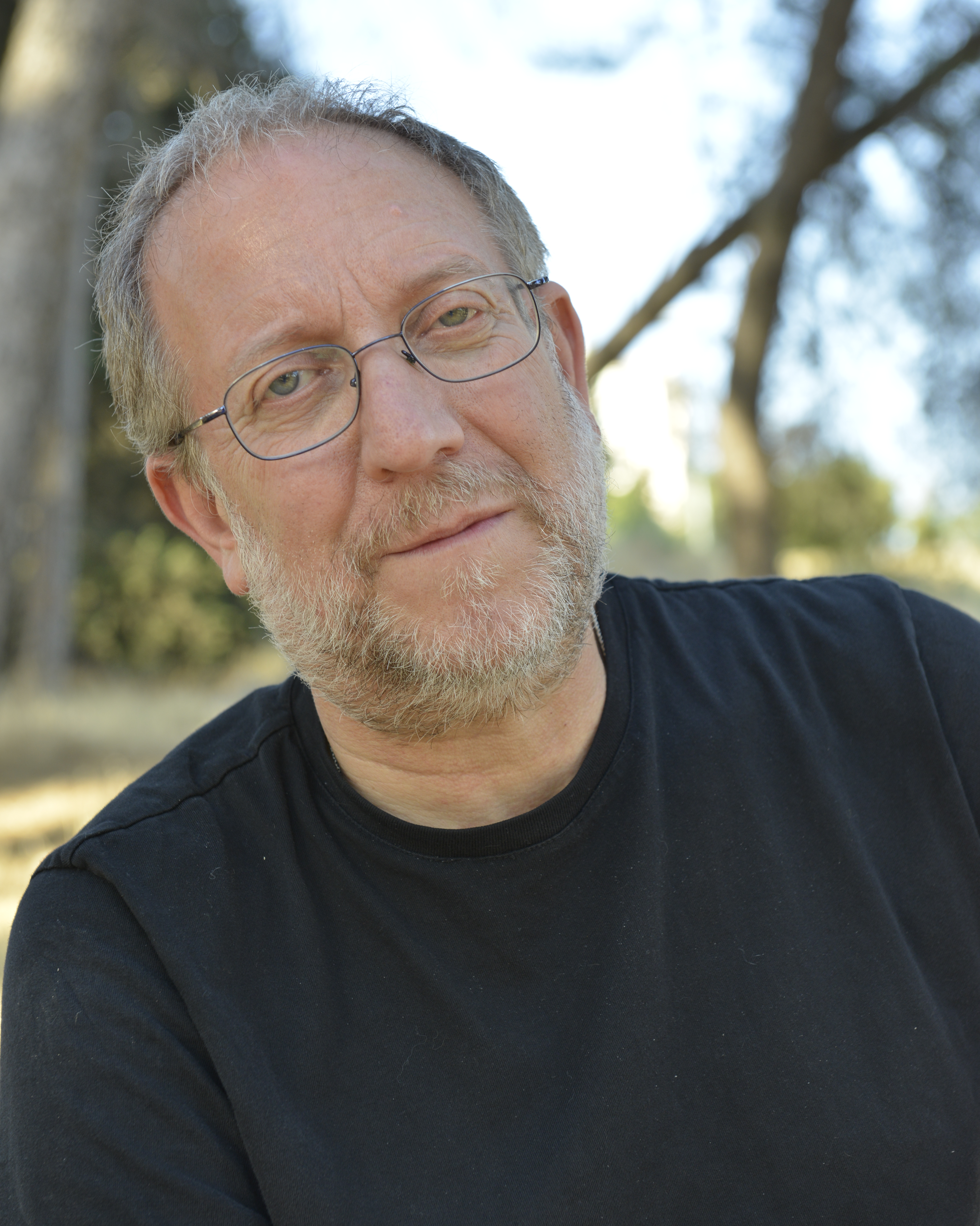
- Born: 1953 (age 72–73); New York City, United States
- Citizenship: United States, Israel
- Education: Brooklyn College (BA); Northwestern University (MA)
- Occupations: non-fiction writer, journalist
- Notable work: Memoirs of a Jewish Extremist (1995); At the Entrance to the Garden of Eden (2001); Like Dreamers (2013); Letters to My Palestinian Neighbor (2018)
- Website: www.yossikleinhalevi.com

Yossi Klein Halevi (Hebrew: יוסי קליין הלוי; born 1953) is an American-born Israeli author and journalist.

== Biography ==
Yossi Klein Halevi was born and raised in Borough Park, Brooklyn, New York in a Jewish family. His parents, Zoltan and Breindy Klein, were Hungarian Jewish immigrants to the United States; his mother had immigrated to the United States before World War II and his father was a Holocaust survivor. After attending high school at Yeshiva University High School for Boys (Brooklyn Branch), he earned a BA in Jewish Studies from Brooklyn College in 1978, and completed his MA in Journalism at Northwestern University. In 1982, Halevi immigrated to Israel. He moved to Israel together with his non-Jewish girlfriend, Lynn Rintoul, who subsequently converted to Judaism and took the name Sarah. They have three children. During the First Intifada, he served as a reservist soldier in an Israel Defense Forces unit patrolling the Gaza Strip.

== Journalistic and literary career ==
Halevi worked as a senior writer for the bi-weekly magazine The Jerusalem Report from its founding in 1990 until 2002. Halevi wrote a column for The Jerusalem Post, and has written op-eds on Israeli issues for The Wall Street Journal, The New York Times, and the Los Angeles Times.

Halevi's first book, Memoirs of a Jewish Extremist, was published in 1995. In it, he tells of his youthful attraction to, and subsequent break with, the militant Rabbi Meir Kahane.

In 2001 he published At the Entrance to the Garden of Eden: A Jew's Search for God with Christians and Muslims in the Holy Land. The book tells of his spiritual journey as a religious Jew into the worlds of Christianity and Islam in Israel. Halevi joined the prayers and meditations in mosques and monasteries, in an attempt to experience the devotional lives of his non-Jewish neighbors and to create a religious language of reconciliation among the three monotheistic faiths.

Halevi's non-fiction book Like Dreamers: The Story of the Israeli Paratroopers who Reunited Jerusalem and Divided A Nation was released by HarperCollins in October 2013 to positive reviews. The book recounts Israel's 55th Paratroopers Brigade capture of Old City Jerusalem in the 1967 Six-Day War and the subsequent lives of seven of these soldiers who played key roles in influencing the politics of modern Israel, from the peace to the settlement movements. The seven featured characters are four Kibbutzniks and three Religious Zionists. They are: Arik Achmon, Udi Adiv, Meir Ariel, Avital Geva, Yoel Bin-Nun, Yisrael Harel and Hanan Porat. In The Wall Street Journal, Elliott Abrams praised the book as "a real-life version of Leon Uris's Exodus," the 1958 historical novel. Like Dreamers won the Book of the Year award in the 2013 National Jewish Book Awards.

On May 15, 2018, Harper published Halevi's book Letters to My Palestinian Neighbor. In the book, Halevi "open[s] a dialogue with an imagined Palestinian neighbor... He frames his chapters as a series of letters to that neighbor that include both concise, balanced histories—of such topics as the history of modern Zionism and the occupation of the West Bank and Gaza—and his own memories of growing up an American Jew afraid that Israel would be destroyed in 1967, moving to Israel, and how his 'romance with the settlement movement ended.'" Halevi says he is seeking "to start the first public conversation between an Israeli writer and our neighbors about who we are, why we see ourselves as indigenous to this land, and what is our shared future in the region." He is making Letters to My Palestinian Neighbor available for free download in Arabic and he has invited Palestinians, Arabs, and Muslims to write to him in response to the book in order to initiate a dialogue. He "may publish the exchanges as a sequel."

Halevi is a senior fellow at the Shalom Hartman Institute, a Jerusalem-based research institute and educational center. He is a former contributing editor of The New Republic. Halevi was a senior fellow at the Shalem Center in Jerusalem from 2003–2009 and he served as a visiting professor of Israel Studies at the Jewish Theological Seminary in New York in the fall of 2013.

== Political activism ==
Halevi has been active in Middle East reconciliation efforts, and serves as chairman of Open House, an Arab-Jewish educational project in the working class town of Ramle. He was a founder and board member of the now-defunct Israeli-Palestinian Media Forum, which brought together Israeli and Palestinian journalists. Halevi supports the two-state solution and has criticized the Israeli settler movement as antithetical to that goal.

In the summer of 2013, Halevi and Imam Abdullah Antepli, the founding director of Duke University's Center for Muslim Life, established the Shalom Hartman Institute's Muslim Leadership Initiative (MLI), which brings North American Muslims to Israel to learn about Judaism, Zionism, and Israel.

== Film ==
Halevi was featured in the 1984 documentary film Kaddish, which focuses on his relationship with his Holocaust survivor father.

== Published works ==
- Memoirs of a Jewish Extremist, New York-Boston: Little Brown and Company, 1995. ISBN 978-0-316-49860-9
- At the Entrance to the Garden of Eden: A Jew's Search for God with Christians and Muslims in the Holy Land. New York: Morrow. 2001. ISBN 9780688169084. "Yossi Klein Halevi."; HarperCollins, 2002, ISBN 978-0-06-050582-0
- Like Dreamers: The Story of the Israeli Paratroopers who Reunited Jerusalem and Divided a Nation, HarperCollins, 2013.
- Letters to My Palestinian Neighbor. Harper. May 15, 2018. ISBN 978-0-062-84491-0.

== Bibliography ==
=== Soviet Jewry ===
Yossi Klein Halevi joined Student Struggle for Soviet Jewry (SSSJ) at the age of 12, led student delegations to confront Jewish establishment organizations in New York and eventually the Ovir (Soviet migrations office) in Moscow. Since the latter 1960s he has written extensively on SSSJ. Two notable pieces are "Jacob Birnbaum and the Struggle for Soviet Jewry," a survey in the journal Azure of Spring 2004 and "Glory" in The New Republic of December 2, 2010, now available as "Lessons of Struggle for Soviet Jewry Remain Relevant."

In his autobiography of his early years, Memoirs of a Jewish Extremist: an American Story (Little, Brown, 1995) he describes his relationship with SSSJ and the JDL (Jewish Defense League).

=== Community ===
- Wrote about murder of Richard Kupferstein, a 19 year old former student of Yeshivas Etz Chaim in Boro Park, who was working evenings in a 16th Avenue Pharmacy.
