= Letters to My Palestinian Neighbor =

2018 book by Yossi Klein Halevi

- Author: Yossi Klein Halevi
- Subject: Israeli–Palestinian conflict
- Publisher: Harper
- Publication date: May 15, 2018
- Pages: 224
- ISBN: 978-0-06-284491-0
- Website: letterstomyneighbor.com

Letters to My Palestinian Neighbor is a 2018 non-fiction book on the Israeli–Palestinian conflict by Yossi Klein Halevi.

In the book, Halevi:

open[s] a dialogue with an imagined Palestinian neighbor ... He frames his chapters as a series of letters to that neighbor that include both concise, balanced histories—of such topics as the history of modern Zionism and the occupation of the West Bank and Gaza—and his own memories of growing up an American Jew afraid that Israel would be destroyed in 1967, moving to Israel, and how his "romance with the settlement movement ended."

Halevi says he is seeking "to start the first public conversation between an Israeli writer and our neighbors about who we are, why we see ourselves as indigenous to this land, and what is our shared future in the region." He is making Letters to My Palestinian Neighbor available for free download in Arabic and he has invited Palestinians, Arabs, and Muslims to write to him in response to the book in order to initiate a dialogue. He "may publish the exchanges as a sequel."

== Reception ==
Letters to My Palestinian Neighbor received positive reviews. Kirkus Reviews called it "A plea for 'radical goodwill' in the face of the seemingly intractable bad blood between Israelis and Palestinians." Publishers Weekly described it as a "heartfelt, empathetic plea for connection and mutual acknowledgement."

In its first week of publication, the book made it to The New York Times Best Seller list for hardcover non-fiction.
