= Solaren =

American solar energy startup corporation

Solaren, Inc. is a Southern California startup corporation created to use solar energy for terrestrial electricity usage. In 2009, the company had a contract under negotiation with Pacific Gas and Electric Company of California to deliver 200 megawatts of power for at least 15 years, starting in 2016. The cost of the contracted activities has been reported as "slightly more" than California's projected energy cost in 2016 of 12.9 cents per kilowatt hour. By 2014, the planned delivery date had been moved back to the end of the decade. Solaren has since announced that the contract with PG&E has been forgone.

Solaren plans to provide this electrical power to PG&E's customers from solar panels mounted on satellites placed in Earth's orbit. The satellite would convert this energy into radio waves and send it to a receiving station in Fresno County, California. The plan is to provide 200 megawatts of continuous power, estimated as the average usage of 150,000 homes.

If successful, this project would be the first implementation of space-based solar power (SBSP). The concept was first dreamed up in 1941 by science fiction author Isaac Asimov in his short story "Reason", and was later described scientifically by Peter Glaser in 1968.
