= 2009 Aftonbladet Israel controversy =

Controversy over report of organ harvesting by Israeli troops

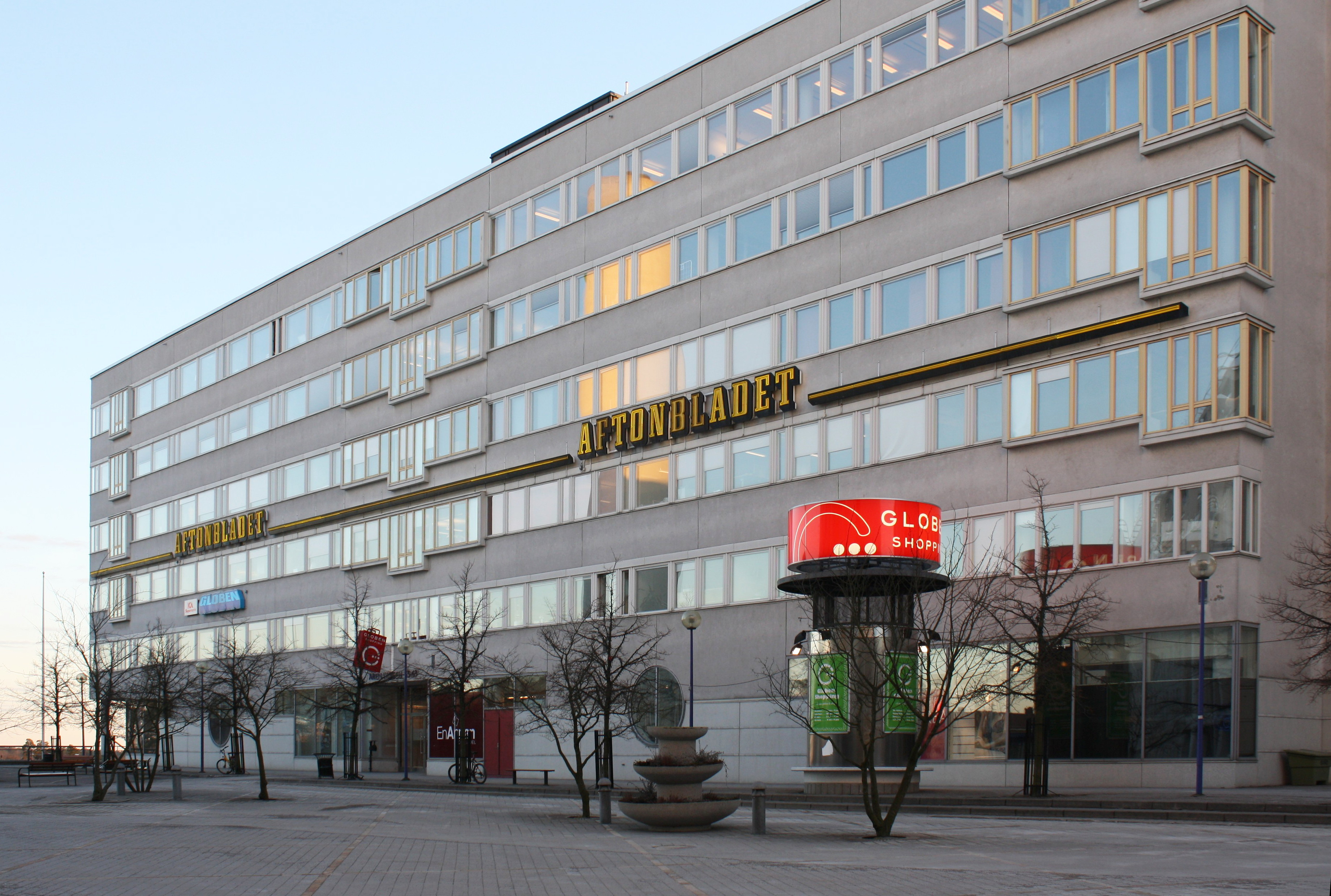
Former headquarters of Aftonbladet, the largest Swedish tabloid.

On 17 August 2009, the Swedish newspaper Aftonbladet published an article alleging that organs had been taken from Palestinians who had been in Israeli custody. Israeli officials rejected the article's allegations and described them as antisemitic. The Swedish government refused to condemn the article, and upheld Aftonbladet's freedom of speech, leading to a rift between the Swedish and the Israeli governments. Palestinian officials and families of the deceased called for an independent investigation. In December 2009, Israeli officials acknowledged that organs and tissues had been taken without family permission from the bodies of Palestinians, Israelis and foreign workers. These Palestinians had been killed by the Israeli military, but Israeli officials emphasized they did not kill Palestinians in order to harvest their organs.

The article that sparked the controversy was written by Swedish freelance photojournalist Donald Boström, with the title Våra söner plundras på sina organ ("Our sons are being plundered for their organs"). It presented allegations that in the late 1980s and the early 1990s, many young men from the West Bank and Gaza Strip had been seized by Israeli forces and their bodies returned to their families with organs missing. It was published by Aftonbladet, one of the largest daily newspapers in the Nordic countries.

The Israeli government and several US representatives claimed that the article was baseless and incendiary, alluding to the history of antisemitism and blood libels against Jews, and asked the Swedish government to denounce the article. The government refused, citing freedom of the press and the Swedish constitution. Swedish ambassador to Israel Elisabet Borsiin Bonnier condemned the article as "shocking and appalling" and stated that freedom of the press carries responsibility, but the Swedish government distanced itself from her remarks. The Swedish Newspaper Publishers' Association and Reporters Without Borders supported Sweden's refusal to condemn it. The former warned of venturing onto a slope with government officials damning occurrences in Swedish media, which may curb warranted debate and restrain freedom of expression by self-censorship. Italy made a stillborn attempt to defuse the diplomatic situation by a European resolution condemning antisemitism. A survey among the cultural editors of the other major Swedish newspapers found that all would have refused the article. The Palestinian National Authority announced that it would establish a commission to investigate the article's claims.

In December 2009, a 2000 interview with the chief pathologist at the L. Greenberg National Institute of Forensic Medicine Yehuda Hiss was released in which he had admitted taking organs from the corpses of Israelis, Palestinians and foreign workers without their families' permission. Israeli health officials confirmed Hiss's confession but stated that such incidents had ended in the 1990s and noted that Hiss had been removed from his post. The Palestinian press said the report "appeared to confirm Palestinians' allegations that Israel returned their relatives' bodies with their chests sewn up, having harvested their organs". Several news agencies claimed the Aftonbladet article accused Israel of killing Palestinians to harvest their organs, although the author, the culture editor for Aftonbladet, and Nancy Scheper-Hughes denied that it had made that claim.

== Article ==
In August 2009, Aftonbladet ran an article by freelance writer Donald Boström in its culture section. The article opened by mentioning arrests related to a suspected money-laundering and organ-trafficking operation involving rabbis, politicians and civil servants in New Jersey and New York. Briefly introducing the problem of the illegal organ trade worldwide, Boström then related that he heard and saw things during his stay in the Palestinian territories in 1992, during the First Intifada.

A photograph accompanying the article depicted a cadaver with a line of stitches on the torso, identified as that of Bilal Ghanem, who was 19 when he was killed by IDF soldiers on 13 May 1992. The Ghanem family was not interviewed for his article, but Boström described his impressions of Ghanem's burial, which he attended:

Together with the sharp noises from the shovels we could hear occasional laughter from the soldiers who, as they waited to go home, exchanged some jokes. As Bilal was put in the grave his chest was uncovered and suddenly it became clear to the few people present just what kind of abuse he had been exposed to. Bilal was not by far the first to be buried with a slit from his abdomen up to his chin and speculations on the intent started.

The next paragraph of the article quoted other Palestinian families and reads as follows:

The affected Palestinian families in the West Bank and Gaza were sure of what happened to their sons. Our sons are used as involuntary organ donors, relatives of Khaled from Nablus told me, as did the mother of Raed from Jenin and the uncles of Machmod and Nafes from Gaza, who had all disappeared for a number of days only to return at night, dead and autopsied.

– Why would they otherwise keep the bodies for up to five days before they let us bury them? What happened to the bodies during that time? Why are they performing an autopsy when the cause of death is obvious, and in all cases against our will? Why are the bodies returned at night? And why with a military escort? And why is the area closed off during the funeral? And why is the electricity cut off? There were lots of upset questions from Nafes uncle.

Boström also wrote that unnamed UN staff members had told him that "organ theft definitely occurred" but that they had been "prevented from doing anything about it". He also reported the response of the IDF spokesperson as being that the allegations of organ theft were lies and that all Palestinian victims are routinely subjected to autopsy. Boström noted that according to Palestinian statistics for 1992, Bilal Ghanem had been one of 133 Palestinians killed and one of 69 going through postmortem examination. Boström concluded the article with his opinion: questions on what was happening remained unanswered and should be investigated.

Meanwhile, family members of Bilal Ghanem, the Palestinian at the centre of the article's allegations, stated that they had never told Boström that Ghanem's organs had been removed. However, even though they never spoke to Boström and lacked any proof to confirm the allegations, they thought that Bilal had been deprived of some organs. In a follow-up editorial, Aftonbladet editor Jan Helin wrote that he approved the article for publication "because it raises a few questions" but acknowledged that the paper then had no evidence for its claims. In August 2009, Boström said that he did not know whether the claims were true but that he wanted them investigated; he made similar remarks at a November conference in Israel. Aftonbladet published an update noting the recent conviction of Yehuda Hiss, Chief Pathologist at Israel's Abu Kabir Institute, and two of his colleagues for improperly taking body tissue from a dead Israeli soldier in 2001. The paper acknowledged that the event did not prove the truth of the original allegations.

== Israeli reactions ==
=== Government ===
The claim in the article sparked an angry reaction by Israeli Foreign Ministry official Yigal Palmor, who associated the article with medieval and 19th-century blood libels. On 23 August, the Israeli Prime Minister, Benjamin Netanyahu, called for the Swedish government to condemn the article. An Israeli official quoted him as saying, "We're not asking the Swedish government for an apology, we're asking for their condemnation". The Israeli Finance Minister, Yuval Steinitz, said that a continued Swedish refusal to condemn the article might lead Israel to cancel a visit, scheduled for September, by the Swedish Foreign Minister, Carl Bildt. Steinitz told the Israel Army Radio, "Whoever doesn't distance himself from this kind of blood libel might not be a welcome guest in Israel at this time. Until the Swedish government understands differently, the state of Israel, the state of the Jews, cannot ignore antisemitic expressions and modern recycling of medieval antisemitism". The Israeli Government Press Office, which accredits foreign journalists visiting the country, said that it was delaying its approval for an Aftonbladet correspondent and photographer who are seeking permission to enter the Gaza Strip by the maximum of 90 days allowed by regulations.

Netanyahu said that history was replete with blood libel against Jews that have led to murder: "These matters cannot be taken lightly. We are not asking from the Swedes anything that we did not ask of ourselves". He reminded his ministers that in February 2009, after a satirical skit on the Israeli Channel 10 that had poked fun at the Christian belief that Jesus walked on water and Mary was a virgin had angered the Vatican, Prime Minister Ehud Olmert had expressed regret and sorrow. Netanyahu commented: "I don't recall that Olmert's condemnation damaged press freedom in Israel".

The Israeli Foreign Minister, Avigdor Lieberman, told Army Radio, "What angers us is that the Swedish government didn't condemn it but hastened to reprimand the ambassador who did find it right to condemn" the story, which he compared to historic antisemitic tracts. He accused Sweden of hypocrisy and called the affair "an odor of anti-Semitism". Lieberman noted the Swedish condemnation of the Muhammed cartoons affair in 2005 as well as Sweden's shutdown of an Internet site in the country that had posted the caricatures and the Swedish foreign minister's letter of apology to the president of Yemen for doing so. He had criticized Sweden for its silence earlier that year when the city of Malmö decided not to allow spectators to a Davis Cup match between Sweden and Israel.

The Israeli Interior Minister, Eli Yishai, said that he would act to prevent the paper's reporters from receiving work permits in Israel. The Welfare and Social Services Minister, Isaac Herzog, said that Israel should take legal steps against the paper. When asked why Israel did not investigate the article's claims, Israel's envoy to Sweden, Benny Dagan, said: "Why don't we investigate why the Mossad and the Jews were behind the bombing of the twin towers? Why won't we investigate why Jews are spreading AIDS in the Arab countries? Why won't we investigate why Jews killed Christian children and took their blood and organs to bake matzot on Pessah?"

=== Admission ===
On 23 December 2009, after Israeli government officials admitted that organ harvesting had taken place in the 1990s, parliamentary hearings into the issue began in Israel's Knesset. Health officials testified that Israeli authorities had harvested organs from the dead bodies of Israelis and Palestinians in the 1990s for transplant purposes and said that the practice had since been ended. Ahmed Tibi, an Arab citizen of Israel, and a member of the Knesset, testified that he had evidence indicating that organ theft continued, citing the case of Fadul Ordul Shaheen, a Palestinian from Gaza who died of diabetes in 2009. Tibi related that after Shaheen's body was returned to his family with bleeding from the eyes and a deep cut through the body, the family said that both the corneas and kidneys were taken from his corpse. Tibi asked for the complaint to be investigated and also for a government probe on whether organs were being harvested from Palestinian prisoners in Israel. Yaacov Litzman, the deputy health minister, responded that he would investigate the case "with all seriousness".

=== Media ===
Gideon Levy, in Ha'aretz, criticized the article and the Israeli response and that the article damaged "the fight against the occupation". Levy criticized Boström for not engaging in documentation, investigation and the presentation of proof. He noted, "There were cases in which the organs of Palestinians who had been killed were harvested without permission, something the [Abu Kabir] Institute of Forensic Medicine has done to others in Israel, for research purposes. But it's a long way from that to suspicion of trafficking in organs based only on the fact that in 1992 a dead Palestinian was found whose organs had been removed and his body sewn back up. And 17 years later a few Jews were arrested on suspicion of trafficking in human organs. That's not professional journalism, that's cheap and harmful journalism". However, he called Lieberman's response "ludicrous" and stated that it had diplomatically damaged Israel.

The editorial line of Ha'aretz was much harsher: "Donald Bostrom, a veteran Swedish journalist, wrote a despicable, utterly baseless article". It stated, however, that Lieberman' reaction was "no less outrageous or inciting" than Bostrom's article: "Lieberman's impassioned and demagogic reaction has damaged Israel. It cheapened the Holocaust, blew the article out of proportion and caused an international uproar, pushing Sweden – which currently holds the presidency of the European Union – into an unnecessary confrontation with Israel".

Maariv published an article reporting that much of Boström's story had come from his book Inshallah (2001), which it stated to have been partly financed by the Swedish Foreign Ministry.

=== Civil society ===
Yoram Peri head of the Chaim Herzog Institute for Media, Politics and Society at Tel Aviv University, said the report touched a raw nerve among Israelis, who harbour deep distrust towards Europe and believe its newspapers to be pro-Palestinian. Agreeing on the lack of merit in the article, he suggests, however, that politicians had blown the controversy out of proportion for political purposes: "Lieberman expressed the feeling of many Israelis who do not understand the European narrative, and they think that any criticism comes from total misunderstanding of the Middle East, or because Europe is totally antisemitic and pro-Palestinian. Very few politicians, unfortunately, are sophisticated enough to distinguish between legitimate criticism and attacks by those with other motives".

Former diplomat Colette Avital said that Sweden should know the difference between freedom of the press and freedom of opinion: "freedom of expression is not unlimited, even in that beautiful northern country". She criticised Israeli official and media reactions as "blown out of all reasonable proportion" and the Israeli Foreign Minister for voicing "ridiculous and ultimately harmful threats" of cancelling the Swedish minister's visit or refusing entry to Swedish journalists.

A support meeting of families of Israeli and Palestinian donors of organs and tissues on 26 August at Sourasky Medical Center, in Tel Aviv, discussed the report. Participants stressed a message that "organ donation is saving lives without any conditions" and called the report black propaganda against Israel.

== Swedish reactions ==
=== Government ===
Elisabet Borsiin Bonnier, the Swedish ambassador to Israel, strongly condemned the article: "The article in the Swedish newspaper is shocking and terrifying for us Swedes, as it influences the Israeli citizens.... The embassy can not emphasize more its disgust". The Swedish foreign ministry and the Swedish foreign minister, Carl Bildt, distanced themselves from the ambassador's statement and underlined that Sweden is a democracy with freedom of press and that state representatives should not comment on individual articles in newspapers.

Mårten Schultz, senior lecturer in jurisprudence, thought that the appeals to freedom of speech were "attempts to use the rhetorically convincing status of the freedom of expression and press legislation in order to pursue a political agenda" and exhorted politicians and journalists to bring out and read the Freedom of the Press Act before they said what the government is not entitled to do. The Office of the Chancellor of Justice said that although, the government can not criticize the decision to publish, it might go further in its criticism of the article without violating the Constitution although that might be "inappropriate". The literal words by the Chancellor of Justice, Göran Lambertz, were the following, according to the Swedish news agency, Tidningarnas Telegrambyrå: "It is not completely clear where the limits are. There is rather a lot one may do, according to the constitution, even if it were to be regarded as politically and legally inappropriate".

On 6 September 2009, Bildt announced the cancellation of a trip he planned to make to Israel on 11 September. There was some speculation in Israel and elsewhere that it was related to the controversy. However, Swedish officials denied that.

=== Legal complaints ===
The Swedish Chancellor of Justice, the sole attorney in enforcing violations to the conventions regarding freedom of the press and freedom of expression as well as the ombudsman on supervising government action both received two written requests asking for investigation into the matter. One asked the chancellor to judge whether the article "really would include anything that brings it beyond what the freedom of press allows – for example constitute hate speech." The second asked him to open an errand of supervision regarding the Swedish ambassador's statements, and on a principal level explain what an ambassador officially can express on behalf of the high office and the country. Aftonbladet was acquitted of all charges.

Nils Funcke, a Swedish journalist and author on the Swedish constitution, predicted that the Swedish ambassador to Israel would be criticized for her initiative. The question, he said, was how sharp the criticism would be and how the government would react. Despite his deep concerns regarding the quality of journalism in the article, he called it "unthinkable" that the chancellor's office would take legal action on its contents.

=== Donald Boström and Aftonbladet ===
The author of the article, Donald Boström, spoke to Israel Radio on 19 August 2009 and said that he was worried by the allegations he reported: "It concerns me, to the extent that I want it to be investigated, that's true. But whether it's true or not – I have no idea, I have no clue". Boström told CNN that the purpose of his article was to call for an investigation into the claims about stealing organs in the early 1990s. In an interview to the Arab media site Menassat, Boström said there was "no conclusive evidence" that organ harvesting was a systematic IDF practice but that there is a "collection of allegations and suspicious circumstances". He was quoted as saying, "The point is that we know there is organ trafficking in Israel. And we also know that there are families claiming that their children's organs have been harvested. These two facts together point to the need for further investigation". The newspaper's editor, Jan Helin, said "I'm not a Nazi, I'm not anti-Semitic" and described himself as "a responsible editor who gave the green light to an article because it raises a few questions" but noted that Aftonbladet had no evidence that Israel practiced organ harvesting. Aftonbladet published a follow-up to Boström's article that defended his report and said that the organ-harvesting allegation "should be investigated, either to stop the relentless Palestinian rumors, or, if the rumors prove to be true, stop the trade in body parts". It called Bonnier's condemnation of the original article a "disgrace".

Boström told Israeli newspaper Yedioth Ahronoth, "I am not an anti-Semite, and that's what saddens me most in this whole story. I've been a journalist for 25 years and I've always written against racism and segregation". He said that he had not meant to imply that IDF soldiers killed Palestinians for their organs: "Even the Palestinians don't say that. What they said is that when the Israeli army returned the bodies, 62 of them had been autopsied and 20 Palestinian families I spoke to were certain that their sons' organs had been harvested". He acknowledged that he had not personally seen evidence of organ harvesting since the bodies that were returned to the families were never examined to determine whether organs had been taken: "As far as I know no one examined the bodies. All I'm saying is that this needs to be investigated". He also said, "Sweden supports Israel as a country and a people, and I am a part of this. There are many people, I among them, who condemn the Israeli government's policy of occupation and violation of international law. Israel needs to withdraw to its borders and evacuate the settlements. If Israel does this, support for you will reappear".

=== Other media ===
The Swedish rival newspaper Sydsvenskan sharply criticized Aftonbladet for publishing what it called "an anti-Semitic conspiracy theory". Henrik Bredberg in Sydsvenskan said:

"Donald Boström publicised a variant of an anti-Semitic classic, the Jew who abducts children and steals their blood.... The regrettable aspects just seem to grow and grow... the Israeli government rages and speaks of an article which 'shames Swedish democracy and the entire Swedish press'. Hardly. Freedom of expression and freedom of the press are part of democracy.... Dare to believe in freedom of the press and open debate. Even when individual editors make stupid and tasteless decisions."

An editorial in Göteborgs-Posten stated:

"The Foreign Ministry has made it clear that Swedish freedom of the press applies. Good. Aftonbladet should not be given the unwarranted glory of martyrdom.... Publication seems to represent an obvious lack of judgment. Unfortunately the lack of judgment did not stop there. The Swedish ambassador in Tel Aviv... attacked the article and thereby created the impression that having views about or intervening in individual publications should be a task for the government and its representatives."

Several political commentators pointed out that Sweden held the presidency of the Council of the European Union at the time of the dispute. From an Israeli point of view, they say, discrediting Sweden as anti-Semitic might be a way to prevent European criticism of Israel's policies.

=== Swedish-Jewish community ===
Lena Posner-Körösi, a leader of Sweden's Jewish community, criticized Israel's official response to Boström's article, stating in an interview with the Israeli army radio that Israel's reaction and media outrage had provided the claims with much more exposure than they would have had otherwise and had blown the story out of proportion. She noted how initial widespread condemnations of Aftonbladet and its article in the Swedish media quickly turned into united defence for freedom of the press when Israel requested that the government should condemn it as well. Posner-Körösi explained that "freedom of expression is sacred" to Swedes and that no one "understands how Israel dares to interfere". Posner-Körösi was still critical of Aftonbladet, stating in her letter to editor Jan Helin that "the Jewish Central Council in Sweden insists that the description is akin to classic antisemitism – Jews who kidnap children to slaughter them and steal their blood. We are confounded how a Swedish newspaper once again permits its pages to include such hate speech and expect that you, as editor and publisher to reject antisemitic statements".

Anders Carlberg, the outgoing chairman of the Jewish Community in Gothenburg called Israel's response "unhelpful". He said that Israel should have responded by publishing a rebuttal: "The stance of the community in general is that it's strange that this has become a government issue at all.... It falls along the lines of Voltaire: I disapprove of what you say, but I will defend to death your right to say it."

== Palestinian reactions ==
=== Palestinian Authority ===
On 3 September 2009, the Palestinian Authority (PA) announced the formation of an interministerial panel to investigate allegations that the Israeli military "stole organs" from Palestinian detainees. The secretary general of the PA Council of Ministers, Dr Hassan Abu Libdeh, said the alleged events, if true, would constitute violations of human rights. The PA's ministers of Health, Interior, and Foreign Affairs, and senior officials from each ministry would, he said, sit on the commission.

In November 2015, in a letter to the UN, the Palestinian Ambassador to the United Nations accused Israel of continuing to harvest organs from Palestinians killed by its forces. Riyad Mansour said that was a confirmation of "past reports about organ harvesting", which prompted Israel to reject the allegations and condemn them as anti-Semitic.

=== Ghanem family and relatives ===
According to The Jerusalem Post, Jalal Ghanem, the brother of Bilal Ghanem, whose photograph had accompanied Boström's article, could not confirm the allegations. Jalal said that Bilal was evacuated by the IDF in a helicopter after he had been shot. His corpse was delivered to the family a few days later, and there were stitches on Bilal's body that ran from the chest down to the bottom of the abdomen, and his teeth were missing. Jalal also said that the only time the family saw the Swedish photographer was at Bilal's funeral photographing the event. In subsequent interview with Al-Jazeera, he added that he thought Bilal was among those who had their organs stolen.

Their mother denied having told any foreign journalist that her son's organs had been stolen, The Jerusalem Post reported in its article. However, she did not rule out the possibility that Israel was harvesting organs of Palestinians. Another relative of the family, Ibrahim Ghanem, said that the family never told the Swedish photographer that Israel had stolen organs from Bilal's body and speculated, "Maybe the journalist reached that conclusion on the basis of the stitches he saw on the body." He also said that the family had no evidence on whether the organs were removed because they had not had an autopsy conducted.

In an interview with Aftonbladet made one week after the original article, Jalal Ghanem and Bilal's mother, Saadega Ghanem, still stood by their allegations and also claimed that Bilal was still alive when he had been taken away. They also claimed that IDF soldiers tried to prevent journalists from taking pictures of the body.

=== Media ===
Palestinian journalist Khalid Amayreh reported in an article in Al-Ahram that prior accusations of organ harvesting had been made by representatives of the Palestinian Authority, including by late Palestinian leader Yasser Arafat. Amayreh noted that no genuine investigation had ever been carried out into the Palestinian allegations of unauthorized organ harvesting even though they had dated to before the 1990s.

British journalist Jonathan Cook, writing for Al-Ahram Weekly, said that Western journalists had heard about such rumours. According to Cook, "the families making the claims were not given a hearing in the late 1980s and early 1990s, during the first Intifada, when most of the reports occurred, and are still being denied the right to voice their concerns today". In an article for the Scottish Daily Record, British politician George Galloway asserted that Israel was "playing mini-Mengele on Palestinian prisoners in Israeli jails", a reference to the Nazi physician Josef Mengele.

=== Civil society ===
In September 2009, hundreds of Palestinians attended a conference marking the "national day for the return of the bodies of martyrs" in Nablus. Palestinian organizations said that Israel was holding the bodies of 275 Palestinians and refusing to return them to their families. After the conference, Mohammad Barakeh, a Palestinian Member of Knesset in Israel, made a connection between the missing bodies and the article in Aftonbladet: "Israel has maintained its reputation and alerted the entire world to the Swedish article. They claim that what was published there could not be true.... The burden of proof falls on Israel, and as long as it refuses to say what the status of the bodies is or return them, it is hiding something awful".

== Reactions from elsewhere ==
=== Iran ===
The Iranian state newspaper Kayhan quoted Arab reporter Kusar Aslam, who claims to have been stationed in Gaza and the West Bank for 22 years, as saying, "Since the early 1970s the Israelis have snatched thousands of Palestinian bodies from hospitals in the territories and transferred them to the Abu Kabir Forensic Institute.... My personal experience verifies the report published by (Donald) Boström". She said that the IDF kidnapped living Palestinians: "I personally witnessed Israeli soldiers and army vehicles snatching Palestinian bodies from emergency rooms. In other instances I saw soldiers follow Palestinians to cemeteries with the intent of stealing bodies before they were buried. This became so widespread that many people began to bury those murdered by IDF forces near their homes – in the yard or under a tree".

=== Syria ===
Syrian President Bashar al-Assad's spokeswoman, Bouthaina Shaaban, praised Boström's article in Asharq Al-Awsat and said Israel "should be put on trial" for its "criminal acts". She claimed that there was a connection between the violation of Palestinian corpses claimed by Boström and the accused Israeli-American organ-trafficking ring whose members were indicted in New Jersey and New York in July 2009.

Yossi Levy, the Israeli Foreign Ministry's spokesman said Shaaban's praise for the article should be a "warning light" for the Swedish government, which "unfortunately has still not fully and courageously condemned the article".

=== United States ===
In a letter to the Swedish prime minister, Representatives Robert Wexler (D-FL) and Elton Gallegly (R-CA), members on the United States House Foreign Affairs Subcommittee on Europe, wrote: "Given the far-reaching implications for this article, which raises the unfortunate specter of similar blood libels and spurious charges that have been directed at Jews throughout the centuries, it is critical that your government unequivocally repudiate and reject the heinous allegations expressed in this article.... It is essential that this vitriolic article not be used by anti-Semites, anti-Israel advocates, and extremists as an excuse to commit acts of violence and terrorism against the Jewish community in Sweden or internationally".

Senator Ben Cardin (D-MD), Chairman of U.S. Helsinki Commission, released a press release that urged European foreign ministers to denounce the Aftonbladet article: "We at the U.S. Helsinki Commission are dedicated to upholding human rights, particularly freedom of the press. But with freedom of the press comes responsibility. And when major press outlets fail to meet their responsibility, and instead raise the specter of racism or anti-Semitism, then public officials are duty bound to speak out and condemn such blatant falsehoods. I commend Sweden's Ambassador to Israel for fulfilling this duty, and I call on the Swedish Government, which currently holds the European Union Presidency, to support Italian and other EU efforts to denounce this harmful reporting".

Co-Chairman of US Helsinki Commission Senator Alcee Hastings (D-FL) said, "This incendiary article draws on age old anti-Semitic imagery, and attempts to place it in a modern context of worrisome hostility in Europe towards both Jews and Israel. Government leaders must demand the press act with journalistic integrity and report responsibly, particularly when it can incite the violent potential of anti-Semitism and other forms of hatred".

Abraham Foxman, the National Director of the Anti-Defamation League (ADL) of B'nai B'rith said that the ADL lodged a complaint with the Swedish embassy in Washington: "Such unfounded rumors – of Jews 'poisoning the wells' and carrying out acts of ritual murder—have been in the playbook of anti-Semites through the centuries, and continue to be believed in parts of the Arab world and elsewhere to this day. What could Mr. Boström and the editors who ushered this article into print have been thinking?" The letter stated, "This article represents nothing less than a base recycling of the medieval blood libel in which Jews were charged with killing Christian children for their alleged ritual use".

In a video on its website on 24 August 2014, Time magazine quoted the 2009 Swedish Aftonbladet report as fact. After a denouncing report from Honest Reporting came out, Time retracted, within hours, the allegations that Israeli soldiers had harvested and sold Palestinian organs in 2009.

=== Reporters Without Borders ===
Reporters Without Borders expressed regret that Israel had gone after the Swedish government for a condemnation: "Regardless of the article's content and although we understand the public outcry it has triggered in Israel, the Israeli authorities must refrain from asking their Swedish counterparts to intervene.... "Aftonbladet alone is responsible for the articles it publishes. The Swedish government is not responsible".

=== Italy ===
In an interview with Haa'rez on 31 August, Italian Foreign Minister Franco Frattini said that he had recently met with Bildt and that both agreed that at a meeting of European Union foreign ministers the next week, they would work to pass a resolution making it clear that the EU, under the Swedish presidency, strongly condemns anti-Semitism and will take action against any manifestation of it in Europe. Frattini said he was intending to demand that the meeting's summary statement explicitly condemn the article.

Later that day, the Swedish news agency TT quoted Carl Bildt as denying the Frattini's conclusion and reported that the head of communications at the Swedish Foreign Ministry, Cecilia Julin, denied that Bildt and Frattini even had discussed the dispute or a possible resolution at the Council of Ministers: "From the Swedish side we have no plans to handle this question through the informal foreign ministers' meeting in Stockholm". According to her, Bildt suggested that Frattini's comment must have arisen through an "Italian misunderstanding". Reinfeldt also insisted that the Swedish government could not take a stand because of Sweden's freedom of the press. At a press conference in Stockholm, he said: "We cannot be asked by anyone to contravene the Swedish constitution, and this is something we will also not do within the European Union".

The Israeli Prime Minister's Office did not comment on Frattini's initiative. However, Palmor said: "Every initiative against anti-Semitism is welcome. But if the declaration is general and does not specifically relate to the article in Aftonbladet, it will not resolve anything". He added that "We did not ask for an apology, or for measures against the newspaper or the journalist. All we asked of Sweden and the Swedes is that they reject and decry the content of the report. And our position has not changed".

== Yehuda Hiss interview ==
In December 2009, Nancy Scheper-Hughes, an anthropology professor at the University of California at Berkeley and founder of a newsletter, "Organs Watch", released the tape of an interview that she had conducted in 2000 with Yehuda Hiss, the director of Israel's L. Greenberg Institute of Forensic Medicine (known colloquially as the "Abu Kabir" Forensic Institute). In the interview, which appeared on Israel's Channel 2 television, Hiss stated that he had harvested organs in the 1990s. "We started to harvest corneas.... Whatever was done was highly informal. No permission was asked from the family". Hiss was fired from his position as director of the forensic institute in 2004 for "repeated body-part scandals". Hiss was later reinstated and remained head of the institute until he retired in October 2012 after allegations of bad procedures at the institute.

Israeli officials acknowledged that such incidents had taken place but stated that neither Israelis nor Palestinians had been specifically targeted, that no such incidents had occurred for a long time and that Hiss had been removed from his position.

Scheper-Hughes stated that Palestinians were not the only ones affected "by a long shot" but that she felt the interview must be made public now because "the symbolism, you know, of taking skin of the population considered to be the enemy, (is) something, just in terms of its symbolic weight, that has to be reconsidered".

In an interview with Al Jazeera, Scheper-Hughes said the organ harvesting took place with the "sanction and approval" of the military establishment and that the "body parts were used by hospitals for transplant purposes – cornea transplants. They were sent to public hospitals [for use on citizens]... and the skin went to a special skin bank, founded by the military, for their uses", like for burns victims.

== See also ==
- Blood libel
- Israel–Sweden relations
- Organ donation in Israel
- Organ harvesting / Organ theft
- Shylock
- Snow White and the Madness of Truth
- Zahra's Blue Eyes
