= Organs Watch =

Medical human rights organization

- Formation: 1999
- Founder: Nancy Scheper-Hughes; Lawrence Cohen; David Rothman; Sheila Rothman
- Founded at: University of California, Berkeley

Organs Watch or Berkeley Organs Watch is a medical human rights and research organization dedicated to monitoring and investigating the global traffic in human organs, tissues, and body parts. Founded in 1999 at the University of California, Berkeley, the organization aims to expose the ethical, social, and political issues surrounding organ trafficking, with a particular focus on the exploitation of vulnerable populations in the global organ trade. It operates as a repository for information on global transplant activities and advocates for policies to curb illicit practices while promoting ethical organ donation systems.

== History ==
Organs Watch was established in 1999 by anthropologist Nancy Scheper-Hughes, a professor of medical anthropology at the University of California, Berkeley, in collaboration with three other professors - Lawrence Cohen, David Rothman and Sheila Rothman from Columbia University. The organization emerged from Scheper-Hughes' work with the Bellagio Task Force on Securing Bodily Integrity for the Socially Disadvantaged in Transplant Surgery, convened in 1994 by the Soros Foundation’s Open Society Institute. During her fieldwork and discussions with transplant surgeons, Scheper-Hughes uncovered evidence that organ trafficking was not merely an urban legend but a real and growing issue, prompting the creation of Organs Watch to systematically investigate and document these practices.

The organization was initially funded by a $230,000 grant from the Open Society Institute, along with $160,000 support from the University of California, Berkeley. Since its inception, Organs Watch has conducted multi-sited ethnographic research across countries including Brazil, South Africa, Israel, Turkey, Moldova, the Philippines, Argentina, India, and the United States, tracking the movements of organs and the networks facilitating their trade.

== Findings ==
1970s–1990s– Organ transplantation, particularly kidney transplantation, becomes a common medical procedure globally, leading to a perceived scarcity of viable organs due to increased demand.

1980s–1990s– The rise of neoliberal global economic policies fuels "medical tourism" for transplant surgeries, creating a niche market for organs and exacerbating divisions between organ donors (often from the Global South) and recipients (often from the Global North).

1990s– Reports of illicit organ trafficking emerge, including allegations of organ theft in developing countries, such as in Argentina, where organs were reportedly taken from mentally ill patients at Montes de Oca asylum without consent.

1996– In Israel, only 7% of the population are registered organ donors, compared to 20–30% in the U.S. and Western Europe, prompting the Israeli Ministry of Health to permit transplant tourism to meet demand.

1998 – In Brazil, Laudiceia Cristina da Silva files a complaint after discovering her kidney was removed during a routine operation, highlighting issues with Brazil’s "presumed consent" law (later revoked) and organ theft concerns.

1998–2001 – Transplant tourism in Israel grows, organized by a business corporation and surgeon Dr. Zaki Shapira, with transplant "packages" costing $120,000–$200,000, involving secret surgeries in countries like Turkey and areas of Eastern Europe.

1999 – In Chennai, India, anthropologist Lawrence Cohen documents women selling kidneys for $1,000 to alleviate debt, reflecting a normalization of organ sales as a form of "debt peonage" in economically distressed communities.

2000– Eurotransplant meeting in Leiden, Netherlands, expands transplant eligibility to include marginalized groups (e.g., those over 70, infants, hepatitis C, and HIV-positive individuals), increasing organ demand and fueling black market growth.

2001–2009: Organs Watch conducts fieldwork in Moldova, tracking 40 kidney sellers. Outcomes include suicides, kidney failure, and social ostracism, with some sellers banished from their communities for disgracing their villages, and lack of medical follow-up after selling organs in Istanbul.

2009 – Released an interview from 2000 with Yehuda Hiss, the former head of the Abu Kabir forensic institute regarding 2009 Aftonbladet Israel controversy.

2010 – A California man, "David," shares his experience of purchasing a kidney for $150,000 through an Israeli broker, traveling from Tel Aviv to Istanbul and then Baku, Azerbaijan, after a planned transplant in Kosovo’s Medicus Clinic is disrupted by a police raid revealing a larger international crime syndicate.

2012 – In the Netcare case in Durban, South Africa, 109 illicit transplants, including five involving minors, are uncovered at Saint Augustine’s Hospital. Netcare pleads guilty, but four surgeons and two coordinators avoid prosecution, claiming deception by the company.

== See also ==
- Organized crime
- Neoliberal economics
- Medical tourism (transplant tourism)
