= Pavesi case =

Organ trafficing case in Brazil

The Pavesi case refers to the death of a ten-year-old Brazilian boy Paulo Veronesi Pavesi (1990 — April 21, 2000). His organs were removed and smuggled to the United States. Several doctors have been charged.

== History ==
On April 19, 2000, ten-year-old Paulo Veronesi Pavesi accidentally fell from the building where he lived. He was taken to a nearby provincial hospital, Hospital Pedro Sanches, where he was treated in an ICU. On April 21, he was then transferred to the Santa Casa Hospital in the town of Poços de Caldas. Later, the same day, brain death was observed. Before he was officially declared brain dead, his organs were removed and then smuggled to the United States.

His father, Paulo Airton Pavesi, became suspicious after receiving a hospital bill for almost R$12,000 for organ removal which should have been paid by the Unified Health System. He wanted to know whether his son had died as a direct result of the cranial injuries which were caused by his fall, or from the untimely and premature surgical removal of his organs.

His appeals to the government fell on deaf ears until, in 2003-2004, the revelations of international organ trafficking in the slums of Recife led to a federal investigation of organ trafficking held in Brasília, during which Paulo’s case was reviewed among others. Initially, none the doctors were held accountable as malicious intent could not be proven. In the aftermath of the incident in 2008, he was forced to leave Brazil due to alleged government persecution, and sought asylum from Italy. He also appeared in a documentary called Human Organ Traffic which featured the case.

In May 2013, the Court of Justice of Minas Gerais ruled that several of Paulo's doctors – Celso Roberto Frasson Scafi, Cláudio Rogério Carneiro Fernandes, and Sérgio Poli Gaspar – were not responsible for the boy's death, and can continue practicing medicine.

On March 30, 2021, two of Paulo's doctors, José Luis Gomes da Silva and José Luis Bonfitto, were sentenced to 25 years and 10 months in prison and payment of a fine, while Marco Alexandre Pacheco da Fonseca was acquitted by the jury. Finally, on April 19, 2022, Álvaro Ianhez, another one of the doctors who treated Paulo, was charged with the double homicide. He was arrested on 9 May and sentenced to prison for 21 years and 8 months.
