= Organ theft =

Removal of bodily organs without consent

Organ theft is the act of taking a person's organs for transplantation or sale on the black market, without their explicit consent through means of being an organ donor or other forms of consent. Most cases of organ theft involve coercion, occurrences in wartime, or thefts within hospital settings. Organ theft is a commonly used trope in speculative fiction.

== Urban legends ==
Recorded rumors of organ theft, particularly involving the theft of one or both kidneys, have been spreading since 1991. These rumors may have originated from a news story involving a Turkish man named Ahmet Koc, who claimed that his kidney was stolen while he was in a hospital. However, it was later discovered that Koc sold his kidney and was dissatisfied with the payment he received.

While there is a significant issue of worldwide organ trafficking, there have been few proven cases of organ theft. Benjamin Radford, an American skeptical investigator, has emphasized the complexity of organ transplantation, highlighting the necessity for organ matches, tight time-frames, and specialized medical training. Radford noted that common variations of the cases, such as a traveler being poisoned or a child being taken for organ harvesting, are improbable scenarios for organ theft.

== Suspected and confirmed occurrences ==
Suspected cases of organ theft generally occur in institutional settings with the systems and expertise that make organ transplants possible.

=== India ===
The Gurgaon kidney scandal, a multi-million dollar illegal kidney transplant racket, was uncovered in January 2008 in Gurgaon, an industrial township near New Delhi, India. Police later arrested several individuals involved in the racket. The victims, primarily from financially destitute backgrounds in Uttar Pradesh, had their kidneys transplanted into clients from various countries, including the United States, United Kingdom, Canada, Saudi Arabia, and Greece. The police raid was initiated based on complaints from locals in Moradabad about illegal kidney sales. Amit Kumar, the main person accused in the scandal, was arrested in Nepal on February 7, 2008, though he denied any involvement in criminal activity.

The scandal involved a local clinic operating for approximately six to seven years. Donors were enticed with around $300 or more for the removal of a kidney, initially under the guise of job opportunities. Later, they were coerced or drugged against their will to undergo kidney removal surgeries.

=== Kosovo ===
The issue of organ theft during and after the Kosovo War has been widely reported and investigated. Accusations suggest that individuals were killed to remove their organs for sale on the black market. The victims were believed to be of Serbian nationality, and the perpetrators were linked to the Kosovo Liberation Army (UÇK) in 1999.

Various estimates were provided regarding the number of victims, ranging from a "handful" to over 300. In 2010, a report by Swiss prosecutor Dick Marty for the Council of Europe (CoE) uncovered "credible, convergent indications" of an illegal trade in human organs dating back over a decade, involving the deaths of some Serb captives. The report was endorsed by the CoE, which called for a thorough investigation.

Since the report's issuance, there have been doubts expressed by some senior sources in the European Union Rule of Law Mission in Kosovo (EULEX) and many members of the European Parliament regarding the report's foundations and evidence supporting the allegations. The head of the war crimes unit of EULEX, Matti Raatikainen, stated that there is no concrete evidence, including no bodies or witnesses, in the case. He described these allegations as a "distraction" that hindered efforts to find the remains of individuals still missing from the conflict.

=== China ===
The allegations of forced organ harvesting from Falun Gong practitioners and other political prisoners in China have raised concerns internationally. These allegations suggest that these individuals are being executed on demand to provide organs for transplant to recipients, and that this practice is driven by both the Chinese Communist Party's persecution of Falun Gong and financial incentives.

A report by David Kilgour, David Matas, and Ethan Gutmann, published by the US government anti-communist think tank Victims of Communism Memorial Foundation, has been a primary source for these allegations. The report claims that political prisoners, particularly Falun Gong practitioners, are targeted for their organs.

Research undertaken by the Washington Post has questioned the allegations. The Washington Post's investigation indicated that China does not import sufficient quantities of immunosuppressant drugs, which are crucial for transplant recipients, to carry out the alleged widespread organ harvesting.

In August 2024, The Diplomat reported its interview with Cheng Pei Ming, the first known survivor of China’s forced organ harvesting. Cheng, a Falun Gong practitioner, recounted how he was subjected to repeated blood tests and a subsequent forced surgery while imprisoned in China and later discovered during medical exams in the U.S. that segments of his liver and a portion of his lung had been surgically removed.

=== Israel ===
The 2009 Aftonbladet Israel controversy erupted following a 17 August 2009 article in the Swedish tabloid Aftonbladet, which alleged that Israeli troops harvested organs from Palestinians. Written by Donald Boström, the article sparked international outrage and strained Sweden-Israel relations. It claimed that bodies of young men from the West Bank and Gaza were returned to their families with missing organs.

That December, further controversy was fueled by the release of an interview with Yehuda Hiss, former chief pathologist at Israel's forensic institute, in which he admitting to harvesting organs from dead Palestinians, and others, without the consent of their families in the 1990s. The Israeli military subsequently confirmed that the practice took place, but added, "This activity ended a decade ago and does not happen any longer."

== In science fiction ==
Organ theft is a common trope in science fiction and wider speculative fiction, having been popularized by the Known Space universe created by Larry Niven, where it is called "organlegging", a portmanteau of "organ" and "bootlegging". Due to organ transplantation becoming safe and universally effective, a huge potential black market in body parts was able to be exploited by murderous racketeers.

Literary critic John Kenneth Muir cited the Vidiians, from TV series Star Trek: Voyager, as an example of the prevalence of organ harvesting story arcs in science fiction, comparing them to similar ideas explored in earlier British television shows such as UFO, Space: 1999, and in the episode "Powerplay" in the third series of Blake's 7. He speculated that there may be a connection between these science fiction storylines and the spread of organ trafficking urban legends. Other academics have made similar observations that the Vidiians and other science fiction depictions of organ harvesting have the potential to adversely influence public knowledge and perceptions of scientific issues, including genetics and organ donation. Clarence Spiger and colleagues, in a study of student perceptions of organ donations, highlighted the Vidiians as an example of a problematic source of information about the topic on television, a medium which many participants had identified as a key source for their understanding. "We can only speculate", they wrote, "that students' responses could have been indirectly or subconsciously influenced through the viewing of such programming." Emily Russell, in exploring the way embalming and other techniques are used to make death appear lifelike, notes that "the conceptual groundwork is laid for organ transfer as the 'gift of life' [and thus] organ 'harvesting' then becomes not the dystopic vision of science fiction, but a celebrated and natural transfer of life from death."

== See also ==
- Charlie the Unicorn, a 2005 short viral video
- Coma, 1977 novel by Robin Cook
  - Coma, 1978 film, based on the aforementioned novel
- Death Warrant, 1990 film, where a murder mystery involves organ theft where healthy prison inmates are murdered for healthy organs
- Fleisch, a 1979 German made-for-television film in which a newly married man is abducted by organ traffickers in the American Southwest
- Organ procurement
- Pound of Flesh, a 2015 film in which a former commando falls prey to organ thieves
- Snakehead, a 2007 Alex Rider novel in which the title character is kidnapped and sent to a facility for organ theft in the Southeast Asian jungle
- Turistas, a 2006 American horror film, in which the main characters who are tourists are abducted in the Brazilian countryside for purposes of organ theft
