= Human organ trafficking in Egypt =

Human organ trafficking in Egypt, as of 2014, mainly practiced in Cairo and the Sinai Peninsula, includes organ harvesting with induced consent, coercion, and outright theft. Egypt has become the largest hub of organ transplant in North Africa as one of the few countries that prohibited organ donation from deceased donors until 2010, with over 500 kidney transplant operations a year and the majority of these organs come from living donors. Sources in the organ trafficking process mainly come from vulnerable populations including domestic rural migrants, undocumented asylum seekers and informal labor. The emergence of cultural and religious increase in organ trade and transplant tourism contribute to the rocketing demand for organ trafficking market in Egypt. Human organ trafficking poses both physical and mental health consequences for victims. Although Egypt has been gradually updating legal frameworks to combat organ trafficking, the regulation has failed in reality protecting survivors and governing transplant professionals.

== Supply ==
=== Domestic rural-urban migrants ===
The process of urbanization in Cairo has expanded resource pressure to the poor labor forces entering the city, upon whom with little access to justice system and local communities organ brokers prey. They migrate for reasons including agricultural deregulation, civil war, and failing local food production market. The rural labor can not find jobs requiring special techniques or good education. A more accessible option is to work in the informal economy with much lower standards than recognized as a new source of family income. These people become more vulnerable to the organ business due to the exploitative working environment.

=== Eritrean and Sudanese asylum seekers ===
As of 2011, it has been known that organ trafficking is part of the trafficking of Sudanese-Eritrean asylum seekers in Egypt, primarily on the Sinai Peninsula. The Sudanese government started to deport Eritrean refugees back to Eritrea in 2016. Those who can not afford the bribe choose to proceed with a new smuggling route to Egypt or Libya, hoping to follow trajectories leading to Israel or Europe. During this process, asylum seekers are held as hostages by the smugglers who are also organ traffickers trapping the asylum seekers with debt-bonded ransoms. Ransoms are generated as a price for vulnerability. Traffickers will offer generous help for asylum seekers, and later ask for financial payback. For those who cannot afford the ransom, the option is to sell their organs. Eritreans are more profitable for the traffickers than victims of other ethnicities.

The Sudanese who successfully arrive in Cairo still face legal marginalization, increasing their vulnerability to organ trafficking. The distinction between asylum and employment seekers is blurred in that all Sudanese are labelled as asylum seekers, since in practice the push forces of forced and voluntary migration are interconnected. These labelled migrants are supposed to register with the United Nations High Commissioner for Refugees in order to secure permanent residency in Cairo, but this process takes several months to years. Along with people rejected registration, these illegal present "asylum seekers" linger in Egypt with limited access to services, no substantive rights to housing or employment, turning into perfect prey for exploitative organ markets.

=== Dual exploitation ===
Dual exploitation often exists in organ trafficking rings in Egypt. For example, women who are trafficked for sex are also forced to sell their organs. Sex is also often offered as a 'sweetener' for transplant surgeons after the removal. The dual exploitation of victims is not clear-cut and often underreported by social service providers.

== Demand ==
Egypt is ranked highest for prevalence of hepatitis C because of backward techniques of sterilization during medical therapies. The country is also highest in its rate of liver failures worldwide. Rates of chronic and end-stage renal disease are also at top. These conditions fuel Egyptians' rocketing demand for organs. The Egyptian culture and religion, moreover, add to the demand of organs from living donors, creating a black market that suits organ trafficking. Internationally, as of January 2019, in the United States alone, there are more than 113,000 patients on the transplant waiting list. On average, 3,000 new patients are added to the list every month. These foreign patients form the demand for organs in Egypt through transplant tourism.

=== Cultural and religious reasons ===
Due to the Egyptian culture dated back to the Pharaohs and mummification, patients in need of organs tend to resist accepting organs from the deceased. Many patients hesitate to ask for organs from a close friend or family for the fear of disruption of family ties and living with guilt. They are more open to accepting organs from a stranger who would take money in return. The dichotomy between religious and medical perspectives is another push factor for buying organs from living vendors. The moment the soul leaves the body generates disagreement, whether it leaves the body when the patient is considered brain-dead or biologically dead. Egypt is among the few Muslim countries that has not agreed upon the concept of brain-death as the diagnosis of death and thus it is defined as the failure of all organs, leading to the increasing demand for organs procured from living donors.

Additionally, the misinformation in the media led by prominent figures has exacerbated the discourse in societal beliefs about organ donation. Muslim jurist and celebrity Muhammad Metwalli al-Sha’rawi has been persistent in his belief that Muslims do not have the right to intervene with God's will. He says, “Our bodies belong to God only, so it’s not yours to give.” This is a simplified representation of Islamic religious scriptures and has generated rapid popularity amongst traditional Muslim communities.

=== Transplant tourism ===
Because of the demand for organs worldwide, transplant tourism plays a role in increasing the demand in Egypt. Transplant tourism refers to the process in which the recipient travels to another country for the purpose of organ transplantation. Egypt is increasingly a hotspot for exporting organs due to the lack of governance and the more "available" population to be exploited. According to a report from WHO, for only Saudi Arabia, there are about 600 people traveling to buy organs from countries like Egypt.

== Health consequences ==
=== Physical health ===
Over 80% of victims who had a kidney removed in Egypt reported severe health decline. Poor medical screening conducted upon harvested victims lead to the deterioration of preexisting health problems. Victims forced to sell their organs by Sinai trafficking networks experience dehumanizing torture and violence that possibly result in life-long trauma or even death. These abuses include loss of body parts, sexual violence, coercive substance use, burns and electrocution.

=== Mental health ===
Worrying of identity revelation, 91% of victims experience social isolation. 94% of victims experienced emotion such as regret and shame. Victims develop life-long psychological trauma in the process of organ trafficking and dual exploitation of sex but they are offered limited treatment.

== Legal regulation ==
There has been no solid legal foundation supervising organ transplantation since its first practice in Egypt in 1976. Laws prohibited organ donation from the deceased donors, meaning that each organ transplantation practice relies upon one living seller-donor. In 2010, the Transplant of Human Organs and Tissues Act criminalized buying and selling organs and allows only donation upon death in Egypt. However, the law had minimal effects practically eliminating the organ black market. The profit that actors get through this lucrative business trumps the mild penalties assigned to legal violation. In 2018, the Egyptian government updated the law with more serious penalties, hoping to reduce organ trafficking within the country, but the criminal sanctions only pushed trafficking underground, and no transplant professionals have been deterred.

=== Failures ===
==== Survivor protection ====
Although the legal framework is established, victims of organ trafficking in Egypt do not receive protection and treatment. Asylum seekers surviving from organ trafficking in Sinai are put into detention centers in Egypt without access to legal consultation. They are obligated to pay by whatever way for their flights back to their home country, failing which they will be labelled as traitors and detained for longer times. Survivors who are offered the opportunity to stay in Egypt still linger at the fringe of the society, with very low labor standards within the informal economy, no legal aid, and hardly any financial sustainability or access to social services.

==== Transplant professionals ====
Transplant professionals involved in the process of organ trafficking, in some cases, fail to pay attention to or recognize the possible illegal source of the organs. The tacit agreement of silence between patients and transplant professionals keeps doctors at a distance from discovering the legality of the organ source. It is reported that transplant professionals hold a positive denial attitude towards organ trafficking: on the one hand, they admit the illegality of buying and selling organs; on the other, they consider organ trafficking as a solution to the surplus demand for organs. Additionally, until 2018 when the Egyptian government added a sentence of less than ten years and a substantial fine, the maximum penalty for professionals involved in organ trafficking process was the loss of their medical licenses, which could be regained through judicial means.

==== Lower Class ====
Victims of organ trafficking target largely the lower classes. Lower classes are ruled by the mechanisms of the black market; this pertains to not only the donors, but the recipients as well. This means lower class organ donors are often in the financial position where they have no choice but to donate organs at prices significantly lower than the value of the organ itself and post-donation health impacts and even defects it can cause. On the other side, lower class patients in need of organs, do not have the financial means necessary to complete black market prices.

== See also ==
- Trafficking for organ trade
