= Organ procurement =

Surgical procedure that removes organs or tissues for reuse

Organ harvesting aka organ trafficking
- MeSH: D020858

Organ procurement (also called surgical recovery) is a surgical procedure that removes organs or tissues for reuse, typically for organ transplantation.

== Procedures ==
If the organ donor is human, most countries require that the donor be legally dead for consideration of organ transplantation (e.g., cardiac death or brain death). For some organs, a living donor can be the source of the organ. For example, living donors can donate one kidney or part of their liver to a well-matched recipient.

Organs cannot be procured after the heart has stopped beating for a long time. Thus, donation after brain death is generally preferred because the organs are still receiving blood from the donor's heart until minutes before being removed from the body and placed on ice. To standardize brain death evaluation, the American Academy of Neurology (AAN) updated guidelines in 2010, requiring coma with known cause, absent brain stem reflexes, and apnea; recent practices emphasize critical care coordination to optimize donor stability and increase procurement rates.

Donation after circulatory death (DCD), also called donation after cardiac death, refers to organ donation from patients in whom life-sustaining treatment is withdrawn and death is declared following irreversible cessation of circulatory and respiratory function; organs are procured after a short, defined no-touch observation period following circulatory arrest. DCD donors may have variable residual brain activity at the time of withdrawal of support, and protocols (including the length of the mandatory observation interval after circulation stops) differ between jurisdictions. For example, UK guidance typically applies a 2–5 minute observation period in controlled DCD pathways, while other countries use different timings within their local protocols. This occurs in situations where, based on the patient's advance directive or the family's wishes, the patient is going to be withdrawn from life support. After this decision has been made, the family is contacted for consideration for organ donation. Once life support has been withdrawn, there is a 2-5 minute waiting period to ensure that the potential donor's heart does not start beating again spontaneously. After this waiting period, the organ procurement surgery begins as quickly as possible to minimize time that the organs are not being perfused with blood. DCD had been the norm for organ donors until 'brain death' became a legal definition in the United States in 1981. Since then, most donors have been brain-dead.

After consent and clinical donor evaluation, donor-recipient matching (based on blood type, tissue typing, size, medical urgency and geography) is coordinated in the United States via the Organ Procurement and Transplantation Network (OPTN), operated under contract by UNOS. The OPTN maintains the national matching algorithms and allocation policy documents.

Coordination between teams working on different organs is often necessary in case of multiple-organ procurement. For trauma patients, successful procurement requires extensive collaboration between trauma teams and organ procurement organizations to ensure viable organs amid physiological instability. Multiple-organ procurement models are also developed from slaughtered pigs to reduce the use of laboratory animals.

The quality of the organ is then certified. If the heart stopped beating for too long, the organ becomes unusable and cannot be used for transplant.

=== Preservation and transport ===
After organ procurement, the organs are often rushed to the site of the recipient for transplantation or preserved for later study. The faster the organ is transplanted into the recipient, the better the outcome. While the organ is being transported, it is either stored in an icy cold solution to help preserve it, or it is connected to a miniature organ perfusion system which pumps an icy solution (sometimes enriched with potassium) through the organ. This time during transport is called the "cold ischemia time". Cold ischemia time targets vary by organ. Historically, hearts and lungs have been transplanted within about six hours of procurement, and livers within a window up to ~24 hours, although shorter times generally improve outcomes. Advances in ex-vivo perfusion and normothermic preservation (e.g., portable organ perfusion systems for heart, lung and liver) have extended safe preservation intervals in some settings and improved early graft assessment, allowing clinically successful transplantation of organs that would previously have exceeded conventional cold ischemia limits. For kidney transplants, as the cold ischemia time increases, the risk of delayed function of the kidney increases. Sometimes, the kidney function is delayed enough that the recipient requires temporary dialysis until the transplanted kidney begins to function.

Recent advancements include hypothermic (4-10 °C) or normothermic (37 °C) machine perfusion, widely used for kidneys and emerging for hearts/lungs/livers, potentially increasing viability and addressing shortages. In the case of DCD, the first technique established for organ procurement was super-rapid recovery. Hypothermic perfusion of kidneys is a relatively widespread practice. For the heart, normothermic preservation has been used in which the heart is provided with warm oxygenated blood and so continues to beat ex-vivo during its preservation. This technique has also been applied to lungs and led to the emergence of donor lung reconditioning centres in North America. For the liver, hypothermic and normothermic techniques are being used with evidence to suggest that both may be beneficial.

There is ongoing research and development to improve machine perfusion and alternative approaches such as novel cryoprotectant solvents to improve organ viability and availability – such as by increasing preservation durations.

In the case of the cornea, normothermic transportation of cadaver corneal endothelial tissue and also full donor corneal transportation in thermo-reversible gelation polymer cocktails have been reported.

== Ethical issues ==
The World Health Organization (WHO) defines and condemns commercial trade in human organs for transplantation and promotes national regulatory frameworks to prevent trafficking, transplant tourism and unethical commercialisation. Estimates of the scale of illicit organ trade vary widely by method and region. WHO reports, regional surveillance, and independent analyses (e.g., the WHO/Global Observatory and subsequent studies) document ongoing illegal or coerced organ procurement in some countries and estimate that illicit activity comprises a non-negligible but variably quantified proportion of global transplantation. These countries include, but are not limited to:

- Angola
- Brazil
- Canada
- China
- Colombia
- Costa Rica
- Eastern Europe
- Ecuador
- Georgia
- Haiti
- Israel
- Kosovo
- Libya
- Mexico
- North Macedonia
- Pakistan
- Peru
- Philippines
- Russia
- South Africa
- The United Kingdom
- The United States of America

A 2024 UNODC report states 0.14% of detected human trafficking victims are trafficked for purposes of organ removal. 175 victims were identified between 2017 and 2023. They were found in approximately 25 countries, and 63% were adult men.

Although the procedure of organ transplantation has become widely accepted, there are still a number of ethical debates around related issues. The debates center around illegal, forced or compensated transplantation like organ theft or organ trade, fair organ distribution, and to a lesser degree, animal rights and religious prohibition on consuming some animals such as pork.

There is a global shortage of transplantable organs relative to need. In the United States, recent official data and independent analyses estimate that roughly 15–20 people die each day while waiting for a transplant (estimates vary by year and by the metric used). OPTN/HRSA and related analyses provide the day-to-day waiting-list and removal-for-death statistics used to compute these estimates. In the US, organ procurement is a $1 billion annual industry managed by organ procurement organizations, with over 60% of costs as overhead and average profits of $2.3 million per organization. When an organ donor does arise, the transplant governing bodies must determine who receives the organ. The UNOS computer matching system finds a match for the organ based on a number of factors including blood type and other immune factors, size of the organ, medical urgency of the recipient, distance between donor and recipient, and time the recipient has been waiting on the waitlist.

Because of the significant need for organs for transplantation, there is ethical debate around where the organs can be obtained from and whether some organs are obtained illegally or through coercion.

=== China ===
In 2005, China admitted to using the organs of executed prisoners for transplant. Due to the religious tradition of many Chinese people who value leaving the body whole after death, the availability of organs for transplant is much more limited. Almost all the organs transplanted from deceased donors came from executed prisoners. Since then, China has repeatedly been found to have a rampant black market for organs for transplant, including continued use of organs from executed prisoners without their consent and targeting young army conscripts for their organs. In 2014, China promised that by January 1, 2015, only voluntary organ donors would be accepted. China has worked to increase the number of voluntary organ donors as well as to convince the international community that they have changed their organ procurement practices after many prior failed attempts to do so. According to the former vice-minister of health, Dr. Huang Jiefu, the number of voluntary organ transplants increased by 50% from 2015 to 2016. Many of the organs harvested are sold to overseas buyers who fly to China for the transplantation procedure. It is possible to schedule these surgeries in advance, which is not possible in systems that rely on voluntary organ donation. In the year 2020, allegations were made that Muslim customers from the Middle East, including Saudi Arabia, reportedly request Halal organs, those which come from a Muslim person from Xinjiang.

In 2022, the International Society for Heart and Lung Transplantation (ISHLT) issued a policy statement to exclude transplant-related research involving human donors from China from its publications and scientific meetings due to the amount of evidence showing that the Chinese government stands alone in systematically supporting organ or tissue procurement from executed prisoners, a practice that the ISHLT identifies as a violation of fundamental human rights and the principle of voluntary donation.

In August 2024, media outlets reported on the first known survivor of China’s forced organ harvesting. The Diplomat reported its interview with Cheng Pei Ming, a Falun Gong practitioner, who recounted how he was subjected to repeated blood tests and a subsequent forced surgery while imprisoned in China and later discovered during medical exams in the U.S. that segments of his liver and a portion of his lung had been surgically removed.

According to recent claims in July 2025, the Xinjiang Health Commission—an agency under China's National Health Commission—intends to establish six additional medical facilities in the Xinjiang region by 2030, raising the total number to nine. Experts have expressed concern that these centers may be used to expand the practice of forced organ harvesting, particularly involving detained Uyghur individuals. The proposed expansion has heightened international scrutiny and alarm over ongoing human rights abuses in the region.

=== India ===
Before 1994, India had no legislation banning the sale of organs. Low costs and high availability brought in business from around the globe, and transformed India into one of the largest kidney transplant centers in the world. However, several problems began to surface. Patients were often promised payments that were much higher than what they actually received. Other patients reported that their kidneys were removed without their consent after they underwent procedures for other reasons.

In 1994, the country passed the Transplantation of Human Organs Act (THOA), banning commerce in organs and promoting posthumous donation of organs. The law's primary mechanism for preventing the sale of organs was to restrict who could donate a kidney to another person. In particular, the THOA bars strangers from donating to one another; a person can only donate to a relative, spouse, or someone bound by "affection." In practice, though, people evade the law's restrictions to continue the trade in organs. Often, claims of "affection" are unfounded and the organ donor has no connection to the recipient. In many cases, the donor may not be Indian or even speak the same language as the recipient. There have also been reports of the donor marrying the recipient to circumvent THOA's prohibition.

=== Israel ===
The Aftonbladet–Israel controversy refers to the controversy that followed the publication of a 17 August 2009 article in the Swedish tabloid Aftonbladet, one of the largest daily newspapers in the Nordic countries. The article alleged that Israeli troops harvested organs from Palestinians who had died in their custody. Sparking a fierce debate in Sweden and abroad, the article created a rift between the Swedish and the Israeli governments. Israeli officials denounced the report at the time and labelled it antisemitic. Written by Swedish freelance photojournalist Donald Boström, the article's title was Våra söner plundras på sina organ ("Our sons are being plundered for their organs"). The Aftonbladet article, published in August 2009 and written by Donald Boström, reported allegations from Palestinian families that bodies returned after military custody had been subject to post-mortem procedures and claimed organs may have been removed. The article called for investigation of those claims. Subsequent reporting and official Israeli statements acknowledged isolated instances in the 1990s in which tissues had been taken without family consent (for example, admissions and testimony relating to the Abu Kabir forensic institute), but the Israeli government and many international commentators rejected claims that troops systematically killed Palestinians to harvest organs.

The Israeli government and several US representatives condemned the article as baseless and incendiary, noted the history of antisemitism and blood libels against Jews and asked the Swedish government to denounce the article. The government refused, citing freedom of the press and the Swedish constitution. Swedish ambassador to Israel Elisabet Borsiin Bonnier condemned the article as "shocking and appalling" and stated that freedom of the press carries responsibility, but the Swedish government distanced itself from her remarks. The Swedish Newspaper Publishers' Association and Reporters Without Borders supported Sweden's refusal to condemn it. The former warned of venturing onto a slope with government officials damning occurrences in Swedish media, which may curb warranted debate and restrain freedom of expression by self-censorship. Italy made a stillborn attempt to defuse the diplomatic situation by a European resolution condemning antisemitism. The Palestinian National Authority announced that it would establish a commission to investigate the article's claims. A survey among the cultural editors of the other major Swedish newspapers found that all would have refused the article.

In December 2009, a 2000 interview with the chief pathologist at the L. Greenberg National Institute of Forensic Medicine Yehuda Hiss was released in which he had admitted taking organs from the corpses of Israeli soldiers, Israeli citizens, Palestinians and foreign workers without their families' permission. Israeli health officials confirmed Hiss's confession but stated that such incidents had ended in the 1990s and noted that Hiss had been removed from his post.

The Palestinian press claimed the report "appeared to confirm Palestinians' allegations that Israel returned their relatives' bodies with their chests sewn up, having harvested their organs".

Several news agencies reported that the Aftonbladet article had claimed that Israel killed Palestinians to harvest their organs, although the author, the culture editor for Aftonbladet, and Nancy Scheper-Hughes denied that it had made that claim.

=== The Philippines ===
Although the sale of organs was not legal in the Philippines, prior to 2008 the practice was tolerated and even endorsed by the government. The Philippine Information Agency, a branch of the government, even promoted "all-inclusive" kidney transplant packages that retailed for roughly $25,000. The donors themselves often received as little as $2,000 for their kidneys. The country was a popular destination for transplant tourism. One high-ranking government official estimated that 800 kidneys were sold annually in the country prior to 2008, and the WHO listed it as one of the top five sites for transplant tourists in 2005.

In March 2008, the government passed new legislation enforcing a ban on organ sales. After the crackdown on the practice, the number of transplants has decreased from 1,046 in 2007 to 511 in 2010. In March–April 2008 the Philippine government restricted transplants for foreign recipients (prohibiting non-related foreign recipients in many cases)and tightened oversight of living non-related donation. Subsequent analyses and national data show a substantial decline in transplants involving foreign recipients and in overall living-nonrelated transplant numbers in the years immediately after the policy change.

== In the United States ==
In the United States, organ procurement is heavily regulated by United Network for Organ Sharing (UNOS) to prevent unethical allocation of organs. There are over 110,000 patients on the national waiting list for organ transplantation and in 2016, only about 33,000 organ transplants were performed. Due to the lack of organ availability, about 20 patients die each day on the waiting list for organs. Organ transplantation and allocation is mired in ethical debate because of this limited availability of organs for transplant. In the United States in 2016, there were 19,057 kidney transplants, 7,841 liver transplants, 3,191 heart transplants, and 2,327 lung transplants performed.

=== Regulation ===
Organ procurement is tightly regulated by United Network for Organ Sharing (UNOS). In the United States, there are a total of 58 Organ Procurement Organizations (OPOs) that are responsible for evaluating the candidacy of deceased donors for organ donation as well as coordinating the procurement of the organs. Each OPO is responsible for a particular geographic region and is under the regulation of the Organ Procurement and Transplantation Network.

=== Geographic Transplant Regions ===
The United States is divided into 11 geographic regions by the Organ Procurement and Transplantation Network. Between these regions, there are significant differences in wait time for patients on the organ transplant list. This is of particular concern for liver transplant patients because transplantation is the only cure to end-stage liver disease and without a transplant, these patients will die. One example that brought this disparity to light was in 2009, when Steve Jobs traveled from California, where wait times are known to be very long, to Tennessee, where wait times are much shorter, to increase his chances of getting a liver transplant. In 2009, when Jobs received his liver transplant, the average wait time for liver transplantation in the United States for a patient with a MELD score of 38 (a metric of severity of liver disease) was about 1 year. In some regions, the wait time was as short as 4 months, while in others, it was more than 3 years. This variation for a patient with the same illness severity has caused significant controversy over how organs are distributed.

=== HOPE Act ===
The HOPE (HIV Organ Policy Equity) Act allows for clinical research on organ transplantation from HIV+ donors to HIV+ recipients. The Act was passed by Congress in 2013 and officially changed OPTN policy to allow for its implementation in November, 2015. Prior to the HOPE Act, it was banned to acquire organs from any potential donor who was known to have, or even suspected to have, HIV. According to UNOS, in the first year of implementation, 19 organs were transplanted under the HOPE Act. Thirteen of those organs transplanted were kidneys and 6 were livers.

== See also ==
- Operation Bid Rig § Organ trafficking
