= Nancy Scheper-Hughes =

American anthropologist

Nancy Hughes
- Born: 1944 (age 81–82); New York City, United States
- Education: University of California, Berkeley
- Awards: Rudolf Virchow Award (2003), Margaret Mead Award (1980)
- Scientific career
- Fields: Cultural anthropology, medical anthropology, critical theory
- Workplaces: Southern Methodist University, University of California, Berkeley

Nancy Scheper-Hughes (born 1944) is an American anthropologist. She is the Chancellor's Professor Emerita of Anthropology and the director and co-founder (with Margaret Lock) of the PhD program in Critical Medical Anthropology at the University of California, Berkeley. She is known for her writing on the anthropology of the body, hunger, illness, medicine, motherhood, psychiatry, psychosis, violence and genocide, death squads, and human trafficking.

Scheper-Hughes is the author of several books, including Death Without Weeping: the Violence of Everyday Life in Brazil (UC Press); Saints, Scholars and Schizophrenics: Mental Illness in Ireland (UC Press, in three editions); Commodifying Bodies (UK Sage) with Loic Wacquant; Violence in War and Peace (Wiley-Blackwell) with Philippe Bourgois; and, most recently, Violence in the Urban Margins (Oxford University Press), with P. Bourgois and J. Auyero.

Scheper-Hughes conducted anthropological fieldwork in Northeast Brazil, Argentina, Israel, South Africa, Moldova, the Philippines and the US. As founding director of Organs Watch, she is a consultant on human organ trafficking for the European Union, Interpol, United Nations, and the Vatican. She has testified in several prosecutions of human traffickers. She was a witness to the organ trade that brought Israeli kidney patients from Israel, Europe and New York City to Durban, South Africa and "kidney sellers" from impoverished communities in Recife. Her investigations of an international ring of brokers and their living organ sellers led to a number of arrests by the FBI.

== Early life, family and education ==
Scheper-Hughes was born in New York City. She was educated at Queens College, and then University of California, Berkeley, where she earned her B.A. in Social Sciences in 1970 and her doctorate in anthropology in 1976. She was a Postdoctoral Fellow for National Institute of Mental Health (NIMH) at Harvard University's Laboratory of Human Development, 1979–1980.

== Career ==
Scheper-Hughes' first book, Saints, Scholars and Schizophrenics: Mental Illness in Rural Ireland (1979), was a study of madness among bachelor farmers, and won the Margaret Mead Award from the Society for Applied Anthropology in 1980. The book established Scheper-Hughes’ ability to provoke controversy through her writing. Especially in Ireland, many readers took umbrage at her portrayal of the disintegration of rural Irish family life due to the collapse of the agrarian economy. In the 20th anniversary edition of the book, Scheper-Hughes provided an update on the transitions the community was undergoing at the time of her original research. She also discussed the challenges and ethics of ethnography, issues that are pushed to the fore as anthropologists increasingly work in communities that can read and critique their work.

In her subsequent book Death without Weeping: The Violence of Everyday life in Brazil (1993), she discusses the violence between mothers refusing to care for their sickly children. Once again, her work had many critics, both inside and outside Brazil, given its depiction of women forced by horrific circumstances to ration their love and favor towards infants and toddlers who seemed to have the best chance of survival, and (even more controversial) her description of mothers "collaborating" and "hastening" the deaths of infants thought to be lacking a will (desejo), a knack (jeito), or a taste (gosto) for life. Death without Weeping has become something of a classic within the field of medical anthropology.

In addition to her full-length monographs, Scheper-Hughes has published on AIDS/HIV in Brazil and Cuba, human rights, death squads, apartheid and shanty town violence in South Africa, and sexual abuse in the Catholic Church, coining or popularizing such terms as the "mindful body" (1987, with Margaret Lock), "political economy of the emotions" (1993a), "life boat ethics" (1993b), "neo-cannibalism" (2001), "sexual citizenship" (1994b), the "genocidal continuum", "militant anthropology" and anthropology "with its feet on the ground" (1995). One of the central themes unifying Scheper-Hughes’ scholarship is how violence comes to mark the bodies of the vulnerable, poor, and disenfranchised with a terrifying intimacy. Her work in Latin America, South Africa, Ireland, and Eastern Europe traces the insidious invisibility of everyday violence, which often makes the vulnerable and exploited into their own wardens and executioners.

Besides her own original research she has helped disseminate the work of scholars such as radical Italian psychiatrist Franco Basaglia, Brazilian educator Paulo Freire, and the Brazilian physician and radical ecologist Josué de Castro, to a wider North American audience.

== International activism ==
Scheper-Hughes served as a Peace Corps Volunteer in Brazil in the 1960s. She has worked as an activist and with social movements in Brazil (in defense of rural workers, against death squads, and for the rights of street children) in the United States (as a civil rights worker and as a Catholic Worker for the homeless mentally ill, against nuclear weapons research at the Lawrence Livermore National Laboratory) and internationally in defense of the rights of those who sell their kidneys.

=== Organ trade ===
In 1999, Scheper-Hughes joined with three other professors to launch Organs Watch, an organization dedicated to research on the global traffic in human organs, tracking the movements of people and organs around the globe, as well as the global inequities that facilitate this trade.

In October 2008, she appeared on the BBC program HARDtalk expressing her strong opposition to the open free buying and selling of organs, even if there were Government oversight through regulation. Her reason for this position is that she feels it will eventually corrupt the entire field because of the inevitability of brokers engaging in satisfying the demands of wealthy buyers for higher quality donors. She is opposed to the Iranian government's regulated organ donor program, involving cash rewards, and predicts it will fail. Her preference is for free voluntary donations from family or friends. She has characterized the efforts of patients waiting for an organ transplant to save their lives through purchasing a replacement organ from a volunteer as just "a new form of commodity fetishism." She deplores the fact that to the dying patients waiting for a transplant, "in the late or postmodern consumer-oriented context, the ancient prescription for virtue in suffering and grace in dying can only appear patently absurd." She recommends instead that the now lethally long waiting lists for organ transplants be trimmed by questioning "the rights of infants and those over 70 to be on the waiting list."

However, in 2010, Nancy Scheper-Hughes already supported legal compensation for organ donations. She also says that compensations are already paid in the “don’t ask, don’t tell” sense. Behind this lies the desperation due to shortage of organ donations.

In the 2000s, Scheper-Hughes investigated an international ring of organ sellers based in New York, New Jersey and Israel. She interviewed several hundred third-world organ donors, and reported that they all felt that they had been taken advantage of, and were often left sick, unable to work, and unable to get medical care. Some of them were tricked into donating organs, and threatened at gunpoint when they tried to resist. Some transplants took place at major New York City hospitals, and Scheper-Hughes said that the hospital personnel knew illegal transplants were taking place. She informed the Federal Bureau of Investigation, which led to arrests several years later.

== Awards and recognition ==
Scheper-Hughes' first book, Saints, Scholars and Schizophrenics: Mental Illness in Rural Ireland (1979), a study of madness among bachelor farmers, won the Margaret Mead Award from the Society for Applied Anthropology in 1980.

In April 2007, Scheper-Hughes was awarded the first Berkeley William Sloane Coffin Jr. Award. The award recognizes moral leadership among members of the community at University of California, Berkeley. The award is named for William Sloane Coffin, a chaplain at Yale University and an activist in the Civil Rights Movement and peace movement.

== Selected publications ==
=== Books ===
- 2003a Commodifying Bodies. Co-edited with Loïc Wacquant. London: Sage Publications. Series in Theory, Culture, and Society.
- 2001b Saints, Scholars and Schizophrenics Berkeley: University of California Press. 20th Anniversary edition. Expanded and updated with new preface and epilogue
- 1999 Small Wars: The Cultural Politics of Childhood. Co-edited with Carolyn Sargent. Berkeley: University of California Press.
- 1993b Death without Weeping: The Violence of Everyday Life in Brazil. Berkeley: University of California Press. (Second edition, paperback).
- 1979 Saints, Scholars and Schizophrenics: Mental Illness in Rural Ireland. Berkeley: University of California Press.

=== Articles ===
- 2007b "Violence and the Politics of Remorse: Lessons from South Africa." In Subjectivity: Ethnographic Investigations, pp. 179–233. João Biehl, Byron Good, and Arthur Kleinman, editors. Berkeley: University of California Press.
- 2006a "The Tyranny of the Gift: Sacrificial Violence in Living Donor Transplants," American Journal of Transplant (Ethics Corner), 7: 1–5
- 2006b "Alistair Cooke’s Bones: a Morality Tale. Anthropology Today (December): 22(6):3–8
- 2006c "Death Squads and Democracy in Northeast Brazil". In Jean and John Comaroff, Eds, Law and Disorder in the Postcolony, pp. 150–187. Chicago: Chicago University Press
- 2005a "Katrina: The disaster and its doubles," Anthropology Today 21(6): 2.
- 2005b "Disease or Deception: Munchausen by Proxy as a Weapon of the Weak." In Lying and Illness: Power and Performance, edited by Els van Dongen and Sylvie Fainzang, pp. 113–138. Het Spinhuis, Amsterdam.
- 2004a Violence in War and Peace: an Anthology. Edited by Nancy Scheper-Hughes and Philippe Bourgois. London: Basil Blackwell.
- 2004b "The Last Commodity: Post-Human Ethics and the Global Traffic in ‘Fresh’ Organs," in Global Assemblages, Aihwa Ong and Stephen Collier, eds. London: Basil Blackwell.
- 2004c "Parts Unknown: Undercover Ethnography of the Organs-Trafficking Underworld". Ethnography 5(1): 29–73
- 2003b "Priestly Celibacy and Child Sexual Abuse," with John Devine. Forum: The Catholic Church, Pedophiles and Child Sexual Abuse. Sexualities 6 (1): 15–39.
- 2003c "A Genealogy of Genocide". Modern Psychoanalysis 28(2): 167–197.
- 2001a "Ishi’s Brain, Ishi’s Ashes." Anthropology Today 17 (1) (February): 12–18.
- 2000 "The Global Traffic in Human Organs." Current Anthropology 41(2): 191–211.
- 1998 "Bodies of Apartheid: Witchcraft, Rumor and Racism Confound South Africa's Organ Transplant Program." Worldview (Fall): 47–53.
- 1995 "The Primacy of the Ethical: Propositions for a Militant Anthropology." Current Anthropology 36 (3) (June): 409–20.
- 1994a "Embodied Knowledge: Thinking with the Body in Critical Medical Anthropology," in Assessing Cultural Anthropology, Rob Borofsky, ed. New York: McGraw-Hill, pp. 229–42.
- 1994b "AIDS and the Social Body." Social Science & Medicine 39 (7): 991–1003.
- 1993a "Life Boat Ethics." Republished in Gender in Cross-Cultural Perspective, pp. 31–37. Caroline Brettell and Carolyn Sargent, eds. Englewood Cliffs, N.J.: Prentice Hall.
- 1991a "The Message in the Bottle: Illness and the Micropolitics of Resistance," with Margaret Lock. Journal of Psychohistory 18 (4): 409–432.
- 1991b "Virgin Territory: The Male Discovery of the Clitoris." Medical Anthropology Quarterly 5 (1) (March): 25–28.
- 1990 "Three Propositions for a Critically Applied Medical Anthropology." Social Science & Medicine 30 (2): 189–197.
- 1989 "Death Without Weeping." Natural History 10: 8–16.
- 1987a *Scheper-Hughes, Nancy. The Mindful Body: A Prolegomenon to Future Work in Medical Anthropology with Margaret Lock. Medical Anthropology Quarterly (1): 6–41. pp.
- 1987b Psychiatry Inside Out: Selected Writings of Franco Basaglia. Edited with introductions and essays by Nancy Scheper-Hughes and Anne M. Lovell. New York: Columbia University Press.
- 1987c "A Children's Diary in the Strict Sense of the Term: Managing Culture-Shocked Children in Brazil." Human Organization 46 (l): 78–83. Reprinted in Children in the Field: Anthropological Experiences, ed. Joan Cassell, 1987. Philadelphia: Temple University Press, pp. 443–54.
- 1986 "Breaking the Circuit of Social Control: Lessons in Public Psychiatry from Italy and Franco Basaglia," with Anne M. Lovell. Social Science & Medicine 23 (2): 159–178.
- 1984 "The Margaret Mead Controversy: Culture, Biology, and Anthropological Inquiry." Human Organization 43 (1): 85–93.
