= Medicus clinic case in Kosovo =

Organ trafficking scandal

Medicus Clinic Case
- Date: November 2008
- Location: Pristina, Kosovo; 42°38′29.65″N 21°8′6.4″E
- Type: Organ trafficking, Organized crime
- First reporter: Kosovo Police, UNMIK
- Outcome: Clinic closure, convictions
- Suspects: Lutfi Dervishi, Arban Dervishi, Yusuf Sonmez, Moshe Harel, Sokol Hajdini, others
- Charges: Human trafficking, Organized crime, Unlawful medical activities

The Medicus clinic case in Kosovo refers to an organ trafficking scandal in 2008 at the Medicus Clinic, a private medical facility located in a suburb near Pristina, Kosovo. The case involved the illegal transplantation of kidneys, with poor individuals from countries such as Turkey, Russia, Moldova, and Kazakhstan lured to the clinic under false promises of payment for their organs. These organs were then sold to wealthy recipients, primarily from Israel, Canada, Germany, and Poland, for substantial sums.

The case, prosecuted by the European Union Rule of Law Mission in Kosovo (EULEX), was a landmark trial as it marked the first instance worldwide where medical doctors were convicted of organ trafficking. The scandal also raised allegations of connections to broader criminal networks, including claims of organ trafficking linked to the Kosovo Liberation Army (KLA) during the 1999 Kosovo War, though these connections remain controversial and unproven in court.

== Background ==
The Medicus Clinic, owned by Kosovo urologist Lutfi Dervishi, operated in a rundown neighborhood near Pristina. It came under scrutiny in November 2008 when a 23-year-old Turkish man, Yilman Altun, collapsed at Pristina International Airport, revealing a fresh surgical scar on his abdomen. Altun claimed his kidney had been removed at the clinic, triggering an investigation by Kosovo and United Nations Interim Administration Mission in Kosovo (UNMIK) police, later continued by EULEX. The investigation uncovered evidence of at least 30 illegal kidney transplants performed at the clinic in 2008, involving a sophisticated international organ trafficking network.

The case gained international attention due to its scale and the involvement of prominent medical professionals. It was further linked to a 2010 Council of Europe report by Swiss senator Dick Marty, which alleged that elements of the KLA had engaged in organ trafficking during and after the Kosovo War, though these claims were not directly substantiated in the Medicus trial.

== Investigation and indictment ==
The investigation began after the airport incident in November 2008, leading to a police raid on the Medicus Clinic. Authorities discovered medical equipment, records of illegal transplants, and evidence of financial transactions. The clinic was closed in 2008, and an indictment was filed in late 2010 by EULEX prosecutor Jonathan Ratel against seven individuals, including Lutfi Dervishi, his son Arban Dervishi (the clinic’s manager), and three anesthesiologists. Two additional suspects, Turkish surgeon Yusuf Sonmez and Israeli citizen Moshe Harel, were charged but remained at large, with Interpol warrants issued for their arrest.

The indictment alleged that the defendants were part of an organized criminal group engaged in human trafficking, organized crime, and unlawful medical activities. Donors, primarily from impoverished regions, were promised up to €15,000 for their kidneys but often received no payment, while recipients paid between €70,000 and €110,000 for the organs. The operations were conducted without proper licensing, as organ transplantation is illegal in Kosovo.

== Trial and convictions ==
=== Initial trial (2011–2013) ===
The trial began in October 2011 at the Pristina Basic Court, presided over by a panel of two EULEX judges and one Kosovo judge. After 19 months, on April 29, 2013, five defendants were found guilty. Lutfi Dervishi was sentenced to eight years in prison for organized crime and human trafficking, while his son Arban received seven years and three months. Three other defendants, including head anesthesiologist Sokol Hajdini, received sentences ranging from one to three years. Two former government officials, including former health secretary Ilir Rrecaj, were acquitted of charges related to issuing a false license to the clinic.

The verdict was significant as it was the first time medical professionals were convicted of organ trafficking globally, drawing international attention. A 125-page judgment detailed the evidence, including medical records and witness testimonies, confirming at least seven illegal transplants.

=== Appeals and retrial (2015–2018) ===
In November 2015, the Kosovo Court of Appeals, consisting of two EULEX judges and one Kosovo judge, unanimously upheld the convictions of Lutfi Dervishi, Arban Dervishi, and Sokol Hajdini. However, on December 15, 2016, the Kosovo Supreme Court, by a 2-1 vote (with the EULEX judge dissenting), overturned the convictions on procedural grounds, ordering a retrial. The decision was criticized as "hyper-technical" and unrelated to the evidence or fairness, undermining six years of judicial efforts.

The retrial began in July 2017 at Pristina Basic Court. Arban Dervishi failed to appear, reportedly a fugitive, while Lutfi Dervishi and Sokol Hajdini continued to face charges. On May 24, 2018, Lutfi Dervishi was sentenced to seven years and six months in prison and fined €8,000, while Hajdini received a one-year sentence. The court found that the clinic had earned approximately €679,000 from the illegal operations.

=== Key suspects at large ===
Yusuf Sonmez, a Turkish surgeon alleged to be a central figure in the trafficking network, and Moshe Harel, an Israeli citizen accused of coordinating donors and recipients, were tried in absentia. Sonmez, who reportedly performed over 2,000 transplants worldwide, remains at large in Turkey, which has no extradition treaty with Kosovo. Harel was arrested in Cyprus in January 2018, and Kosovo requested his extradition, but the outcome remains unclear.

=== Alleged KLA connection ===
The Medicus Clinic case was linked in a 2010 Council of Europe report to allegations of organ trafficking by the KLA during the 1999 Kosovo War. The report, authored by Dick Marty, suggested that senior KLA figures, including Kosovo’s then-Prime Minister Hashim Thaçi, were involved in harvesting organs from Serbian prisoners. These allegations, particularly centered around a site in Albania known as the "Yellow House," (a clinic in Fushë-Krujë) remain unproven in court and have been met with skepticism by EULEX and European Parliament members due to a lack of concrete evidence. Thaçi and other named individuals have denied the accusations. The Medicus trial did not address these claims directly, focusing solely on the 2008 operations.

== Legacy ==
The Medicus Clinic was sold after its closure in 2008, and organ transplantation remains illegal in Kosovo. The case also contributed to the establishment of the Hague-based Kosovo Specialist Chambers to investigate alleged KLA crimes, though no indictments directly related to the Medicus case have been issued.

== See also ==
- Organ trafficking
- Kosovo War
- European Union Rule of Law Mission in Kosovo (EULEX)
- Kosovo Liberation Army
