= Donald Boström =

Swedish journalist, photographer and writer

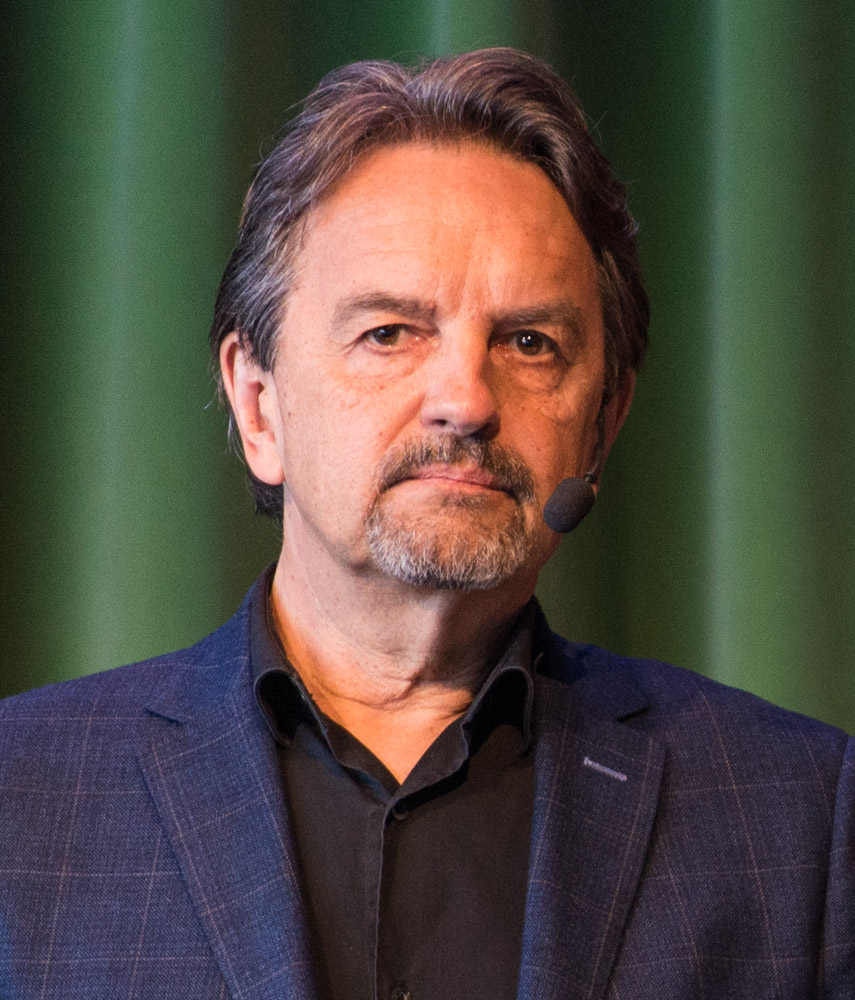
Donald Boström in 2015

Carl Donald Boström (born 30 May 1954) is a Swedish journalist, photographer, and writer. He is known for his writings and photography relating to the Palestinian-Israeli conflict. He is also a former WikiLeaks volunteer and has authored several cookbooks.

== 2009 article on organ trafficking ==
On 17 August 2009 the tabloid Aftonbladet published an article by Boström, "Våra söner plundras på sina organ" ("Our sons are plundered of their organs"), alleging that Israel was stealing organs from Palestinians who died in custody. Boström mentioned that the autopsies were performed at the Abu Kabir Forensic Institute, an institute whose chief pathologist, Yehuda Hiss, admitted to organ theft in 2005 from 125 bodies. As a background Boström mentioned the charges against Levy Izhak Rosenbaum of Brooklyn, arrested as part of Operation Bid Rig for conspiring to arrange the sale of an Israeli citizen's kidney for $160,000. The article prompted outrage in Israel, with accusations that the claims were anti-Semitic and represented a Blood libel against Jews, and set off a diplomatic row between the Israeli and Swedish governments.

The Swedish and Israeli media were highly critical of the article, and a survey among the cultural editors of the other major Swedish newspapers found that all would have refused the article as it was based on outmoded hearsay and rumors. Family members of Bilal Ghanem, the Palestinian at the center of the article's allegations, confirmed that Ghanem's organs had been removed after he was shot at the gate of his family's home and transferred by the military ambulance to a helicopter. Israeli forces returned the body to his family a week after in a state which his brother, Jalal Ghanem, describes as: "It was very clear that there was no abdomen, it showed from the way it was stitched. There were no teeth in his mouth".

In his interview with the Arab news site Menassat, Boström is quoted as saying: "There is no conclusive evidence, only a collection of allegations and suspicious circumstances ... The point is that we know there is organ trafficking in Israel. And we also know that there are families claiming that their children's organs have been harvested. These two facts together point to the need for further investigation". Reporting about a media conference in Dimona, where Donald Boström participated in order to defend his article "before a hostile audience", Israeli newspaper Haaretz states that Boström admitted that he had no proof beyond the allegations of the families of Palestinians killed by the Israeli army.

== Financing ==
Israeli daily Ma'ariv reported that Bostrom's 2001 book Inshallah, which deals with the Israeli-Palestinian conflict and reportedly included the allegations of organ harvesting relating to the Abu Kabir Forensic Institute, was financed – among other bodies – by the Swedish Foreign Ministry.

Boström received the 2007 KW Gullers stipendium (scholarship) from the Nordic Museum in honor of the late Swedish photographer K.W. Gullers.

== Works ==
- Nilsson, Bengt (1990). "Tårgas & oliver". Stockholm: Arbetarnas bildningsförbund. (photographer)
- Johansson, Agneta (1993). Faces of Jerusalem : Ansikten i Jerusalem. Örebro: Libris. ISBN 91-7194-961-5. (photographer)
- Boström, Donald; Boström, Lars (2001). Inshallah : konflikten mellan Israel och Palestina. Stockholm: Ordfront. ISBN 91-7324-860-6. (also photographer and editor)
- Boström, Donald; Hasselbohm, Anders (2003). Mat för gudar : [libanesisk matkultur från Beirut Café]. Stockholm: Wahlström & Widstrand. ISBN 91-46-20341-9. (also photographer and editor)
- Kronér, Lasse (2003). Boström, Donald (ed.). Åttio väldigt goda mackor. Stockholm: Wahlström & Widstrand. ISBN 91-46-20294-3.
- Boström, Donald (2005). Snabb sund mat : enkla vardagsrecept med Kocklandslaget. Prisma: Stockholm. ISBN 91-518-4452-4. (also editor)
- Albons, Birgitta (2005). Muren. Stockholm: Leopard. ISBN 91-7343-093-5. (photographer)
- Boström, Donald, ed. (2007). Salam : om krig, fred och islam. Malmö: Arena. ISBN 978-91-7843-276-9.
