= Gurgaon kidney scandal =

Indian medical scandal

The multi-billion rupee Gurgaon kidney scandal came to light in January 2008 when police arrested several people for running a kidney transplant racket in Gurgaon, an industrial township near New Delhi, India. Kidneys of most of the victims, who were the poor hailing from the nearby western Uttar Pradesh, were transplanted into clients from the United States, United Kingdom, Canada, Saudi Arabia and Greece. The police raid was prompted by complaints by the locals from Moradabad about illegal kidney sales. The man accused of the scandal, Amit Kumar, was arrested in Nepal on 7 February 2008 and denied any hand in criminal activity.

== Chronology of events ==
=== The police raid ===
On 24 January 2008, police teams from Haryana and Uttar Pradesh raided a residential building and a guest house owned by Amit Kumar.

According to the Gurgaon police, the scandal at a local clinic had been going on for six to seven years. The donors were lured with offerings of about Rs. 30,000 for kidney 'donation'. First, they were lured to the clinic on the pretext of job opportunities. They were instead asked for donating their kidneys for a fee and all those who resisted this were drugged against their will and subsequently operated upon.

The Haryana police, under whose jurisdiction the crime happened, issued arrest warrants against Upendra Aggarwal, a general physician and an associate of Amit Kumar for his involvement in the scandal. However, at the time of the police raid, Kumar and his other accomplices escaped after the knowledge of possible arrests.

The raid helped rescue five people and shifted them to a Gurgaon hospital.

=== Aftermath of the raid ===
On 25 January 2008, the police detained a United States–based non-resident Indian couple and three Greek nationals, two among them being patients receiving the transplants.

The police revealed that Dr. Amit Kumar and his accomplices had performed 600 kidney transplants in the past decade. Additionally, at least two hospitals were involved in the after care of patients. Police, through the technology of fingerprinting, determined that Kumar went by many aliases and had been previously arrested at least four different times for illegal organ trade operations. It was further revealed that Kumar, his brother Jeevan Kumar, Upendra Aggarwal and Saraj Kumar, an anesthesiologist were previously arrested three times on charges of illegal human organ transplantation in Delhi, Andhra Pradesh and Maharashtra. They were, however, released on bail. On 7 January 2008 Kumar was arrested by Delhi Police but was released on a bribe of Rs. 20 lakhs. Jeevan Kumar was later arrested on 17 February 2008 in Delhi.

The Indian Medical Association, arranged a probe by its three-member committee, and further requested investigation by Central Bureau of Investigation (CBI), India's higher investigation agency. The Haryana police further uncovered 2 hospitals and 10 laboratories in Greater Noida and Meerut, cities nearby to New Delhi for their alleged involvement in the scandal.

In the meanwhile, a Gurgaon court had issued arrest warrants for Amit Kumar and his brother, Jeevan Kumar Rawat. With growing suspicions that Kumar might have fled the country, the Haryana police requested the CBI to alert the Interpol. Thereafter, Red corner notices were issued for the Kumar siblings.

=== Arrest of Amit Kumar ===
On 7 February 2008, Amit Kumar was arrested in the neighboring country of Nepal. He was hiding in a wildlife resort, about 35 miles from the Indo-Nepal border. He had a bank draft worth Rs. 9,36,000 along with a total of €145,000 and $18,900 in cash. At the resort he made an unsuccessful attempt to bribe the Nepali policemen to let him go. The charges filed against him by CBI are under sections 326 (voluntarily causing grievous hurt by dangerous weapon), sections 342 (wrongful confinement), sections 420 (cheating) and sections 120B (criminal conspiracy).

=== Subsequent conviction ===
In March 2013, a CBI special court convicted five accused while acquitting another five in the case of a Gurgaon kidney transplant racket that was busted in 2008. Dr Upender Dublesh and Dr Amit Kumar, who was termed a "quack" in no uncertain terms by the court, got seven-year rigorous imprisonment (RI) besides a fine of over Rs. 60 lakh each.
