= Khalid Amayreh =

Palestinian journalist (1957–2023)

Khalid Amayreh (Arabic: خالد عمايرة; February 9, 1957 – July 12, 2023) was a Palestinian journalist based in Dura, near Hebron.

== Conflict with the Palestinian Authority ==
Amayreh was barred from leaving the West Bank for many years; he was confined to his home village of Dura, near Hebron, by the Israeli military authorities. The Palestinian Human Rights Monitoring Group issued various reports on the harassment of Amayreh by both Israel and Palestinian authorities.

On January 22, 2009, Amayreh was arrested by the police forces of the Palestinian Authority (PA) after he criticized the PA for suppressing protests. He was questioned and imprisoned in a blacked-out room for two days. The PA stated the reason for his arrest was not his reporting about financial corruption in the PA but suspicion of affiliation with Hamas. He was ultimately released.

He was arrested and interrogated on several occasions by the PA beginning in January 2012.

== Views and opinions ==
In 2008, in an article that was picked up and redistributed widely across various websites and listservs, he stated that:

"It is well known that Israel, through the numerous Zionist lobbies and pressure groups, more or less controls America's politics, media and financial institutions…. But America doesn't lack the brain power to know the facts and find out the truth about the umbilical connection between the Israeli factor and the ravaging financial crisis now facing the US… I am afraid there will be more bad news in this regard if America doesn't reclaim its liberty from the Zionist Robber Barons who have come to tightly control the American financial establishment."

Amayreh believes that antisemitism in Arab societies originates in "Israel's murderous oppression of the Palestinian people."

In 2010, Amayreh described Helen Thomas and Fidel Castro as the "elderly targets" of "Zionist supremacists from Tel Aviv to Los Angeles", supporting calls for Jewish "invaders" to return to Poland and their "native homelands".

In March 2011, he wrote that Israelis are "pathological liars and colonialist invaders from Eastern Europe" and that Jerusalem has been "violated and raped by Zionist Jews for many years". He described Zionism as a "genocidal, racist, rapacious, covetous, and of course utterly mendacious… a malignant cancer" and claimed that Israel wishes to erect a "Hebrew empire" encompassing "Palestine, Jordan, Lebanon, Syria, Iraq, Kuwait, northern Saudi Arabia, northern Egypt and the islands of Crete and Cyprus".

Amayreh has been accused of distorting the historical record regarding the nature of Arab nationalism.

== Death ==
On July 12, 2023, at the age of 66, Amayeh died from a fatal heart attack. He is survived by his daughter, Azhaar Amayreh.

== Books ==
- Journalism and Mass Communication, Theory and Practice (Arabic, 1996)
- Refutation of Western Myths and Misconceptions About Islam and the Palestinian Question (Arabic, 1988)
- Living Under the Israeli Occupation (Arabic, 2007)
- My Story with the Shiites: Major Contradictions in the Shiite Imami Religion (Arabic, 2016; English, 2017)
