= Critical medical anthropology =

Critical medical anthropology (CMA) is a branch of medical anthropology that blends critical theory and ground-level ethnographic approaches in the consideration of the political economy of health, and the effect of social inequality on people's health. It puts emphasis on the structure of social relationships, rather than purely biomedical factors in analyzing health and accounting for its determinants.

CMA starts with the idea that human health is a biosocial and political ecological product. Consequently, CMA is critical of the tendency to naturalize the process of health and illness in the health and social sciences. CMA dates to the 1980s, but has deeper roots in critical theory concerning the social determinants of health. CMA adds an anthropological dimension to traditional critical approaches, thereby avoiding a top-down perspective. In other words, CMA recognizes that there is interaction between the macro-level of social structure, the meso-level of social organization and agentive action, and the micro-level of individual experience and health.

During the early years of medical anthropology's formation, explanations within the discipline tended to be narrowly focused on explaining health-related beliefs and behaviors at the local level in terms of specific ecological conditions, cultural configurations, or psychological factors. While providing needed insight about the nature and function of traditional and folk medical models, the initial perspectives in medical anthropology tended to ignore the wider causes and determinants of human decision making and behavior. Explanations that are limited to accounting for health-related issues in terms of the influence of human personalities, culturally constituted motivations and understandings, or even local ecological relationships, emergent critical medical anthropologists began to argue, are inadequate because they tend not to include examination of the structures of social relationship that unite (commonly in an unequal fashion) and influence far-flung individuals, communities, and even whole nations. A critical understanding, by contrast, involves paying close attention to what has been called the “vertical links” that connect the social group of interest to the larger regional, national, and global human society and to the configuration of social relationships that contribute to the patterning of human behavior, belief, attitude, and emotion.

Consequently, what came to be called critical medical anthropology focused attention on understanding the origins of dominant cultural constructions in health, including which social class, gender, or ethnic group's interests particular health concepts express and under what set of historic conditions they arise. Further, CMA emphasizes structures of power and inequality in health care systems and the contributions of health ideas and practices in reinforcing inequalities in the wider society. Moreover, CMA addresses the social origins of illness, such as the way in which poverty, discrimination, industrial pollution of the environment, social violence, and fear of violence contribute to poor health. Critical medical anthropologists argue that experience and “agency,” that is, individual and group decision-making and action, are constructed and reconstructed in the action arena between socially constituted categories of meaning and the political-economic forces that shape the context [and texture] of daily life. In other words, people develop their own individual and collective understandings and responses to illness and to other threats to their well-being, but they do so in a world that is not of their own making, a world in which inequality of access to health care, the media, productive resources (e.g., land, potable water, clean air), and valued social statuses play a significant role in their daily options.

Additionally, while recognizing the fundamental importance of physical (including biological) reality in health, such as the nature of particular pathogens or the release of toxins into the environment, CMA emphasizes the fact that it is not merely the idea of “nature”—the way external reality is conceived and related to by humans—but also the very physical shape of nature, including human biology, that has been deeply influenced by an evolutionary history of social inequality, overt and covert social conflict, and the operation of both physical power and the power to shape dominant ideas and conceptions in society and internationally through processes of globalization, control of production and reproduction, and control of labor.
