= Organ trade =

Buying and selling of human body parts, usually for transplantation

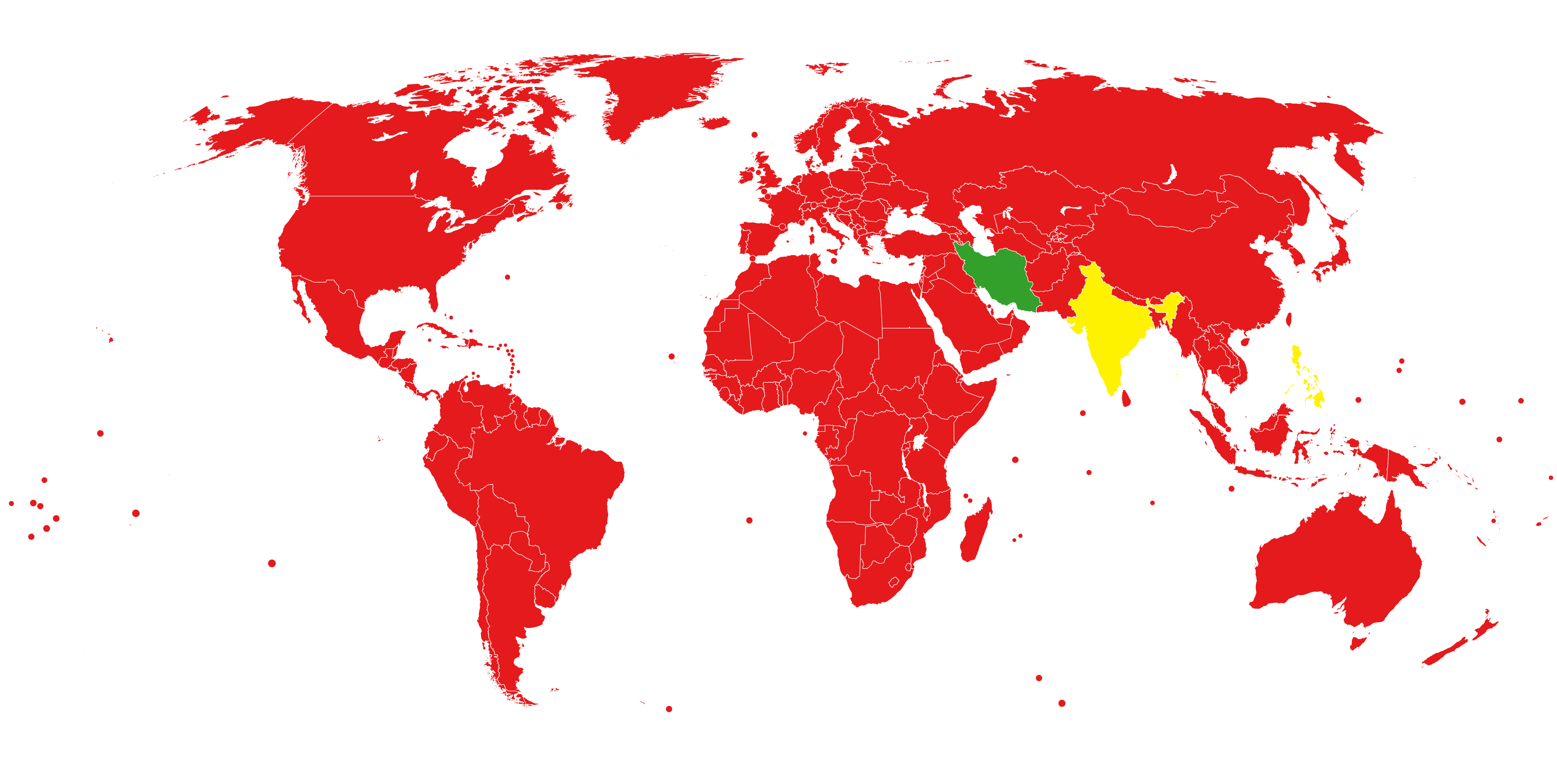
Organ trade is legal; Organ trade is illegal; Organ trade previously legal

Organ trade (also known as the blood market or the red market) is the trading of human organs, tissues, or other body products, usually for transplantation. According to the World Health Organization (WHO), organ trade is a commercial transplantation where there is a profit, or transplantations that occur outside of national medical systems. There is a global need or demand for healthy body parts for transplantation, which exceeds the numbers available.

Commercial trade in human organs is currently illegal in all countries except Iran. Recent bans on the commercial organ trade (e.g. India in 1994 and the Philippines in 2008) have increased the availability of transplants and the safety of the procedures. Despite these prohibitions, organ trafficking and transplant tourism remain widespread (however, the data on the extent of the black market trade in organs is difficult to obtain). The question of whether to legalize and regulate the organ trade to combat illegal trafficking and the significant global organ shortage is greatly debated. This discussion typically centers on the sale of kidneys by living donors, since human beings are born with two kidneys but need only one to survive.

== History ==
The first scientific report of the phenomenon dates back to a publication in The Lancet in 1990. The study tracked 131 patients from the United Arab Emirates and Oman who underwent kidney transplants in Bombay and who reportedly experienced numerous post-operative problems.

In its report on organ trafficking in Europe, the Social, Health and Family Affairs Committee of the Council of Europe wrote: "On a global scale, organ trafficking is not a new problem. In the 1980s, experts began to notice a practice that was later dubbed 'transplant tourism': wealthy Asians traveled to India and other parts of Southeast Asia to obtain organs from poor donors. Since then, other destinations have emerged, such as Brazil and the Philippines. According to some allegations, China is involved in the trade of organs taken from executed prisoners. Organ sales continue in India despite new laws in the country that make this practice illegal in most regions. While current estimates suggest that the illicit organ trade remains relatively modest in Europe, this problem does not lose any of its seriousness, as it is very likely that with new medical advances, the gap between supply and demand for organs will continue to widen."

== Legal organ trade ==
=== In Iran ===
Iran is the only nation that allows organs to be bought and sold. Due to lack of infrastructure to maintain an efficient organ transplant system in the early 1980s, Iran legalized living non-related donation (LNRD) of kidneys in 1988. The Charity Association for the Support of Kidney Patients (CASKP) and the Charity Foundation for Special Diseases (CFSD) control the trade of organs, with the support of the government. These nonprofit organizations match donors to recipients, setting up tests to ensure compatibility. Donors receive tax credit compensation from the government, free health care insurance, and often direct payment from the recipient with the average donor being paid $1,200. Some donors are also offered employment opportunities. Charity organizations support recipients that cannot afford the cost of the organ.

Iran does place restrictions on the commercial organ trade in an attempt to limit transplant tourism. The market is contained within the country; that is, foreigners are not allowed to buy the organs of Iranian citizens. Additionally, organs can only be transplanted between people of the same nationality. Proponents of legalized organ trade have hailed the Iranian system as an example of an effective and safe organ trading model. In addition, the LNRD model is compatible with the social climate in the country. Religious practices in Iran stymies donation culture in the country as organ donations is often viewed as taboo. In 2017, from a possible 8,000 cases of brain death, 4,000 organs were viable, but only 808 were transplanted due to lack of consent. The Iranian system has been criticized as coercive, as over 70% of donors are poor. There is no short-term or long-term follow-up on the health of organ donors. There is evidence that Iranian donors experience highly negative outcomes, both in terms of health and emotional well-being. In 2023, reports from regional sources have shared details on how Iran began accepting bartered payments for organs in poor rural areas in lieu of traditional payments, in some cases even accepting goats as payment.

In Iran's legal markets, the typical price paid to donors on the black market is about US$5,000, but some donors receive as little as US$1,000. In addition, black market transplants are often dangerous to both the donor and recipient, with some contracting hepatitis or HIV.

=== Government compensation for donors ===
Australia and Singapore have legal monetary compensation for living organ donors. Proponents of such initiatives say that these measures do not pay people for their organs; rather, these measures merely compensate donors for the costs associated with donating an organ. For example, Australian donors receive nine weeks' paid leave at a rate corresponding to the national minimum wage. Kidney disease advocacy organizations in both countries have expressed their support for this new initiative.

Although United States federal law prohibits the sale of organs, it does permit state governments to compensate donors for travel, medical, and other incidental expenses associated with their donation. In 2004, the state of Wisconsin took advantage of this law to provide tax deductions to living donors to defray the costs of donation.

=== Kidney paired donations ===
Although all nations apart from Iran prohibit financial transactions for organs, most permit "paired donations" or kidney swaps across multiple parties. Paired donations address the problem of tissue compatibility in organ transplants. For example, person A may wish to donate a kidney to their spouse but cannot due to antibody incompatibilities. However, their kidney may be a good match for a stranger (person B) married to someone whose kidney would be compatible with person A's spouse. In a paired donation, person A would agree to donate their kidney to person B, in exchange for person B's spouse promising to donate a kidney to person A's spouse.

Such paired donations are arguably a form of organ sale – instead of purchasing a kidney for a loved one with cash, a person pays for it with their own kidney. In fact, in the United States, the spread of kidney paired donations was initially stymied due to language in the National Organ Transplantation Act barring the transfer of human organs for "valuable consideration".

== Illegal organ trade ==
According to the World Health Organization (WHO), illegal organ trade occurs when organs are removed from the body for the purpose of commercial transactions. Despite ordinances against organ sales, this practice persists, with studies estimating that anywhere from 5% to 42% of transplanted organs are illicitly purchased. Countries reported to have growing illegal organ markets include, but are not limited to Angola, Brazil, Canada, China, Colombia, Costa Rica, Egypt,Georgia, Haiti, Israel, Libya, Mexico, Peru, Philippines, Russia, South Africa, United Kingdom, and the United States.

Though claims of organ trafficking are difficult to substantiate due to lack of evidence and reliable data, cases of illegal organ trade have been tried and prosecuted. The persons and entities prosecuted have included criminal gangs, hospitals, third-party organ brokers, nephrologists, and individuals attempting to sell their own organs. Poverty, corruption, and insufficiencies in legislation and enforcement drive the prevalence of the illegal organ trade. These factors also pose difficulties in tracking accurate statistics of the trade and market forces across countries.

In 2023, Nigerian politician Ike Ekweremadu, his wife, and a physician were convicted and sentenced in the United Kingdom of conspiring to exploit a Nigerian man for his kidney under the UK's modern slavery laws.

=== Transplant tourism ===
The United Network for Organ Sharing defines transplant tourism as "the purchase of a transplant organ abroad that includes access to an organ while bypassing laws, rules, or processes of any or all countries involved". The term "transplant tourism" describes the commercialism that drives illegal organ trade, but not all medical tourism for organs is illegal. For example, in some cases, both the donor and the recipient of the organ travel to a country with adequate facilities to perform a legal surgery. In other cases, a recipient travels to receive the organ of a relative living abroad. Transplant tourism raises concerns because it involves the transfer of healthy organs in one direction, depleting the regions where organs are bought. This transfer typically occurs in trends: from South to North, from developing to developed nations, from females to males, and from people of color to whites. In 2007, for example, 2,500 kidneys were purchased in Pakistan, with foreign recipients making up two-thirds of the buyers. In the same year, in Canada and the United Kingdom, experts estimated that about 30 to 50 of their transplant patients illegally purchased organs abroad.

The kidney is the most commonly sought-after organ in transplant tourism, with prices for the organ ranging from as little as $1,300 to as much as $150,000. Reports estimate that 75% of all illegal organ trading involves kidneys. The liver trade is also prominent in transplant tourism, with prices ranging from $4,000 to $157,000. Though livers are regenerative, making liver donations non-fatal, they are much less common due to an excruciating post-operative recovery period that deters donors. Other high-priced body parts commonly sold include corneas ($24,400) and unfertilized eggs ($12,400), while lower-priced bodily commodities include blood ($25–337), skin ($10 per square inch), and bones/ligaments ($5,465). While there is a high demand, and correspondingly a very high price, for vital organs such as hearts and lungs, transplant tourism and organ trafficking of these parts is very rare due to the sophisticated nature of the transplant surgery and the state-of-the-art facilities required for such transplants.

=== Global reaction ===
The international community has issued many ordinances and declarations against the organ trade. Examples include the World Medical Authority's 1985 denouncement of organs for commercial use; the Council of Europe's Convention on Human Rights and Biomedicine of 1997 and its 2002 Optional Protocol Concerning Transplantation of Organs and Tissues of Human Origin; and the Declaration of Istanbul on organ trafficking and transplant tourism. The Declaration of Istanbul defines transplant commercialism, organ trafficking, and transplant tourism. It condemns these practices based on violations to equity, justice, and human dignity. The declaration aims to promote ethical practices in organ transplantation and donation on an international level. It is nonbinding, but over 100 transplant organizations support its principles, including countries such as China, Israel, the Philippines, and Pakistan, which strengthened their laws against illegal organ trading after the declaration's release.

The World Health Organization (WHO) has also played a prominent role in condemning the illegal organ trade. The WHO first declared organ trade illegal in 1987, stating that such a trade violates the Universal Declaration of Human Rights. It also condemns the practice on the grounds that it "is likely to take unfair advantage of the poorest and most vulnerable groups, undermines altruistic donation and leads to profiteering and human trafficking." In 1991, at the 44th World Health Assembly, it approved nine guiding principles for human organ transplant. The principles clearly stated that organs cannot be the subject of financial transactions. On May 22, 2004, these guidelines were slightly amended at the 57th World Health Assembly. They are intended for the use of governments worldwide. These global initiatives have served as a helpful resource for establishing medical professional codes and a legal framework for the issue, but have not provided the sanctions required for enforcement.

=== Illicit organ trade in specific countries ===
==== China ====
Since the late 1980s, China relied on executed prisoners to provide the bulk of its transplanted organs. This ready source of organs made it second only to the United States for number of transplantations performed. There is evidence that the government attempted to downplay the scope of organ harvesting through confidentiality agreements and laws, such as the Temporary Rules Concerning the Utilization of Corpses or Organs from the Corpses of Executed Prisoners. Critics further allege that organs were not distributed on the basis of need, but rather allocated through a corrupt system or simply sold to wealthy Chinese and foreign individuals. One source estimates that China executed at least 4,000 prisoners in 2006 to supply approximately 8,000 kidneys and 3,000 livers for foreign buyers.

In the 2000s, the country came under increasing international and domestic pressure to end the practice of using organs from prisoners. Since then, it has implemented a number of reforms addressing these allegations. It has developed a registry of voluntary, non-incarcerated donors; it is believed that these living and deceased donors supply most of the organs transplanted in the country today. China also standardized its organ collection process, specifying which hospitals can perform operations and establishing the legal definition of brain death. In 2007, China banned foreign transplant patients and formally outlawed the sale of organs and collecting a person's organs without their consent.

Many non-profit organizations and international jurists are skeptical that China has truly reformed its organ transplant industry. In particular, although the number of organs taken from prisoners has dropped dramatically, there is no prohibition on collecting organs from deceased inmates who sign agreements purporting to donate their organs. There continue to be reports of prison officials offering death row inmates the opportunity to "voluntarily" donate their organs upon death, with the implication that those who decline may get worse treatment from their jailers.

In 2019, allegations of forced organ harvesting in China were examined by the China Tribunal, an independent people’s tribunal chaired by Geoffrey Nice KC, former prosecutor at the International Criminal Tribunal for the former Yugoslavia.

After assessing all available evidence, including expert medical testimony, statistical analysis of transplant data, investigative research, and witness accounts from former detainees and medical professionals, the tribunal concluded that forced organ harvesting from prisoners of conscience had been committed in China for years and on a significant scale, constituting crimes against humanity.

The tribunal determined that Falun Gong practitioners had been one — and probably the principal — source of organs for China’s transplant industry.

With respect to Uyghurs, the tribunal found evidence of mass detention and systematic medical testing consistent with organ profiling, and concluded that Uyghurs were at risk of being used as an organ source and constituted a likely future source of organs, while noting that there was insufficient evidence at the time of the judgment to conclude that they had been subjected to forced organ harvesting on the same scale.

The tribunal further concluded that forced organ harvesting was ongoing at the time of the judgment and that no evidence had been presented to demonstrate that it had ceased.

The tribunal’s findings were reported by international media and medical journals. The BMJ described the judgment as concluding that forced organ harvesting had occurred in China on a significant scale and highlighted serious ethical concerns for the global medical community. Major news organisations, including BBC News and The Guardian, also reported on the tribunal’s conclusions and findings.

In August 2024, The Diplomat reported its interview with Cheng Pei Ming, the first known survivor of China's forced organ harvesting. Cheng, a Falun Gong practitioner, recounted how he was subjected to repeated blood tests and a subsequent forced surgery while imprisoned in China and later discovered during medical exams in the U.S. that segments of his liver and a portion of his lung had been surgically removed.

==== India ====
Before 1994, India had no legislation banning the sale of organs. Low costs and high availability brought in business from around the globe, and transformed India into one of the largest kidney transplant centers in the world. However, several problems began to surface. Patients were often promised payments that were much higher than what they actually received. Other patients reported that their kidneys were removed without their consent after they underwent procedures for other reasons.

In 1994, the country passed the Transplantation of Human Organs Act (THOA), banning commerce in organs and promoting posthumous donation of organs. The law's primary mechanism for preventing the sale of organs was to restrict who could donate a kidney to another person. In particular, the THOA bars strangers from donating to one another; a person can only donate to a relative, spouse, or someone bound by "affection". In practice, though, people evade the law's restrictions to continue the trade in organs. Often, claims of "affection" are unfounded and the organ donor has no connection to the recipient. In many cases, the donor may not be Indian or even speak the same language as the recipient. There have also been reports of the donor marrying the recipient to circumvent THOA's prohibition.

==== Philippines ====
Although the sale of organs was not legal in the Philippines, prior to 2008 the practice was tolerated and even endorsed by the government. The Philippine Information Agency, a branch of the government, even promoted "all-inclusive" kidney transplant packages that retailed for roughly $25,000. The donors themselves often received as little as $2,000 for their kidneys. The country was a popular destination for transplant tourism. One high-ranking government official estimated that 800 kidneys were sold annually in the country prior to 2008, and the WHO listed it as one of the top five sites for transplant tourists in 2005.

In March 2008, the government passed new legislation enforcing the ban on organ sales. After the crackdown on the practice, the number of transplants has decreased from 1,046 in 2007 to 511 in 2010.

==== United States ====
On September 21, 2021, 92 Republican members of the U.S. Senate and House asked the heads of multiple federal agencies to investigate organ harvesting for research purposes. The letter stated, "We are alarmed by public records obtained from the National Institutes of Health (NIH) which show that the University of Pittsburgh (Pitt) may have violated federal law by altering abortion procedures to harvest organs from babies who were old enough to live outside the womb." However, PolitiFact reported several months earlier that "There is no indication that the fetal tissues used in the [University of Pittsburgh] experiments were 'purchased'," suggesting that the congress members' later description of this research as involving organ harvesting was inaccurate.

=== Impact on the poor ===
Data from the World Health Organization indicates that donors in the illegal organ trade are predominantly impoverished people in developing nations. In one study of organ donors in India, for example, 71% of all donors fell below the poverty line. Poor people (including poor migrants) are more likely to fall victim of organ theft. Accounts of this practice usually characterize the victims as unemployed individuals (often but not always men) between the ages of 20 and 40 who were seeking work and were taken out of the country for operations.

Poor people are also more likely to volunteer to sell their organs. One of the primary reasons donors articulate for why they sell their organs is to pay off debt. Migrants for instance may use the money to pay off human traffickers. The most impoverished are frequently viewed as more reliable targets for transplant tourists because they are the most in need of money. While some supporters of the organ trade argue that it helps lift some people out of poverty by providing compensation to donors, evidence of this claim is hotly debated. In many cases, people who sell their organs in order to pay off debt do not manage to escape this debt and remain trapped in debt cycles. Often, people feel like they have no choice but to donate their kidneys due to extreme poverty.

Reports by the World Health Organization show decreased health and economic well-being for those who donate organs through transplant tourism. In Iran (where organ sales are legal), 58% of donors reported negative health consequences. In Egypt, as many as 78% of donors experienced negative health outcomes, and 96% of donors stated that they regretted donating. These findings are relatively consistent across all countries: those who sell their organs on the market tend to have poorer overall health. Substandard conditions during transplant surgeries can also lead to transmission of diseases like hepatitis B, hepatitis C, and HIV. Donors' poor health is further exacerbated by depression and other mental illnesses brought on by the stress of donating and insufficient care after surgery.

Impoverished donors' economic outcomes are no better than their health outcomes. A study of Indian donors found that while 96% of donors sold a kidney to pay off debts, 75% still required operative care that is not provided by the buyer. Donors in all countries often report weakness after surgery that leads to decreased employment opportunities, especially for those who make a living through physical labor.

=== Issues with enforcement ===
Though many statutes regarding organ trade exist, law officials have failed to enforce these mandates successfully. One barrier to enforcement is a lack of communication between medical authorities and law enforcement agencies. Often, enforcement officials' access to information regarding individuals involved in illegal organ transplants is hindered by medical confidentiality regulations. Without the ability to review medical records and histories to build an effective case against perpetrators, officials cannot fully enforce organ trade laws. Many critics state that in order to prohibit illegal organ trading effectively, criminal justice agencies must collaborate with medical authorities to strengthen knowledge and enforcement of organ trade laws. Critics also support other criminal justice actions to meet this goal, such as prioritizing organ trafficking issues among local legislative bodies; multidisciplinary collaboration in cross-border offenses; and further police training in dealing with organ trafficking crimes.

=== Media portrayal ===
There have been various portrayals of illegal organ trade and organ trafficking in the mass media over the past few decades. Many, such as the 1993 book The Baby Train by Jan Brunvand, are variations of the urban legend of an individual who wakes up in a hotel bathtub to discover that one of his or her kidneys has been removed. The 1977 novel Coma by Robin Cook, made into a movie by Michael Crichton, tells of unsuspecting medical patients who are put into a coma in order for their organs to be removed. In the 1994 video game Policenauts by Hideo Kojima, the main protagonist, a private investigator named Jonathan, while investigating the murder of his ex-wife and her husband's disappearance, uncovers an illegal drug and organ trafficking ring designed to counteract the negative side-effects of being in space for long periods of time.

In addition to books, films, and video games, stories of organ trafficking are often depicted through television, tabloid magazines, emails, and the Internet. Many of the organ trafficking tales depicted in the media contain unsubstantiated claims. For example, the 1993 British and Canadian TV program The Body Parts Business made a number of claims about organ trafficking that later proved to be false. The program investigated alleged organ and tissue trafficking in Guatemala, Honduras, Argentina, and Russia. One episode discussed a man named Pedro Reggi, reporting that his corneas had been removed without his consent while he was hospitalized in a mental facility. Reggi later disputed this claim, saying that his corneas were still intact, and he had just been suffering from an acute eye infection.

Critics, such as Silke Meyer, argue that this sensationalized view of organ trafficking, often based in urban myth, distracts attention from the illegal organ trade. They call for increased scientific research on illegal organ trade, so that organ trafficking legends can be replaced by scientific fact. Meyer argues: "Only then will [organ trafficking] be taken seriously by all governments affected and will the results constitute a solid ground for the field of policy-making."

=== Proposed solutions ===
Various solutions have been proposed to staunch the flow of illegal organs around the globe. The primary strategy is to increase the supply of legally donated organs, thereby decreasing the demand that drives the illicit organ trade. One way to accomplish this goal is for states to implement policies of presumed consent. With presumed consent laws (also known as "opt out" laws), consent for organ donation is assumed upon death unless the individual previously "opted out" by submitting documentation. This is in contrast to "opt-in" organ donation policies, which assume that a deceased person would not have wished to donate unless they had previously notified the government of their intention to donate. Presumed consent policies have already been adopted in various countries, including Brazil, certain jurisdictions of the United States, and several European nations. Research shows a 25–30% increase in the amount of available organs in "opt-out" countries.

Another proposed method is to enact laws that would hold doctors accountable for not reporting suspected organ trafficking. Scheper-Hughes has written extensively on the issue of doctors knowingly performing illegal operations with illicit organs. She argues that though doctors might be violating doctor-patient privilege by reporting suspected organ trafficking, their legal obligation to the patient is superseded by public interest in ending medical violations of human rights. If accountability measures were imposed, doctors would be liable as accomplices if they knowingly performed operations with black market organs.

Personal health records for migrants can help to document information on detected missing organs, and even previously done surgeries. Some projects have been started to keep personal health records of immigrants. Detection of missing organs and associated surgeries is an important first step to detect illicit organ harvesting.

Many people in the United States believe that adopting a system for regulating organ trading similar to Iran's will help to decrease the national shortage of kidneys. They argue that the U.S. could adopt similar policies to promote accountability, ensure safety in surgical practices, employ vendor registries, and provide donors with lifetime care. They further argue that private insurance companies and the federal government would be invested in providing such care for donors, and that laws could be enacted to make long-term care an inviolable condition of any donation agreement.

== Ethical debate ==
The ethical debate of organ trade rests on whether or not people have an inherent right to sell their own organs and, if so, whether or not the potential harms of organ sales override that right. While in most democratic countries, there is an implied ethical right to what happens to one's body, in the US this right was dictated by the Scheloendorff decision through the court's opinion by Justice Benjamin Cardozo:

"Every human being of adult years and sound mind has a right to determine what shall be done with her own body."

However, this autonomy is limited in organ trade as governments and some ethicists argue the potential harm of organ trade outweighs the rights of an individual. The closest legalized comparison of a right to bodily autonomy for financial gain would be prostitution. Currently 32 countries allow prostitution; none of them allow for the sale of an organ. Views on legalization of prostitution have often viewed it as a "necessary evil" and of prostitution can be legalized as long as the sex worker's human rights such as freedom of speech, travel, work, immigration, health insurance, and housing, are not deprived. Similarly, many argue that as long as the donors rights are respected and the trade is regulated, it would be ethically responsible for organ trade to exist.

Organ trade also raises ethical and legal concerns for healthcare providers towards the treatment of patient. Specifically, currently there is little to no guidance on how does the doctor–patient relationship change if the patient received an organ through illegal means. Further more, if organ trade is legalized, an obligation for a physician to respect the patients wish to sell an organ. In the US, there is controversy on whether organ donation wishes are legally enforceable. The primary law governing organ donation is the Uniform Anatomical Gift Act (UAGA). However, it is widely considered inadequate as it is up to each state to regulate and uphold this law, with enforcement varying between states for cadaver body donation. Further more, donor shortages still persists in the United States. To avoid lawsuits, providers would violate UAGA and side with the next of kin and ignore any preexisting organ donation requests.

== Arguments for legalization ==
The main argument made in favor of legalized organ sales is that it would increase the number of organs available for transplantation. Although governments have implemented other initiatives to increase organ donation – such as public awareness campaigns, presumed consent laws, and the legal definition of brain death – the waitlist for vital organs continues to grow. Further more, cadaver organ transplantations have poorer clinical outcomes as compared with live organ donations. Legalizing payments for organs would encourage more people to donate their organs. Each organ sold on a market could potentially save the life (and improve the quality of life) of its recipient. For example, patients with kidney disease who receive a kidney transplant from a living donor typically live 7 to 15 years longer than those who depend on dialysis.

Economists generally lean in favor of legalizing organ markets. The consensus of American Economic Association members is that organ trade should be allowed, with 70% in favor and 16% opposed. Another literature review, looking at the publications of 72 economic researchers who have studied organ trade, reached a similar conclusion: 68% supported legalization of the organ trade, while only 21% opposed it.

Proponents also assert that organ sales ought to be legal because the procedure is relatively safe for donors. The short-term risk of donation is low – patients have a mortality rate of 0.03%, similar to that of certain elective cosmetic procedures such as liposuction. Moreover, they argue, the long-term risks are also relatively minimal. A 2018 systematic review found that kidney donors did not die earlier than non-donors. Donors did have a slightly increased risk of chronic kidney disease and pre-eclampsia (a condition sometimes seen in pregnancy). The review found no difference in the rates of diabetes, heart disease, high blood pressure, or mental illness. Multiple studies of American and Japanese donors found that they reported a higher quality of life than the average non-donor. Proponents of organ markets argue that, given the comparative safety of donating a kidney, individuals should be permitted to undergo this operation in exchange for payment.

Critics challenge this view of transplantation as being overly optimistic. Specifically, they cite research suggesting that individuals who sell their organs fare worse after the procedure than those who freely donate their organs. Kidney sellers are more likely to have renal problems after the operation (such as hypertension and chronic kidney disease), to report reduced overall health, and to suffer from psychological side effects such as depression.

Advocates of organ markets say that people ought to be free to buy or sell organs just as they are free to sell their labor. According to this perspective, prohibitions against selling organs are a paternalistic or moralistic intrusion upon individuals' freedom. Proponents acknowledge that, unlike selling a material possession such as a car, selling a kidney does carry some risk of harm. However, they note that people are able to undertake dangerous occupations (such as logging, soldiering, or surrogacy) which carry significant chance of bodily harm.

Other physicians and philosophers argue that legalization will remedy the abuses of the illicit trade in organs. The current ban on the sale of organs has driven both sellers and buyers into the black market, out of sight of the law. Criminal middlemen often take a large cut of the payment for the organ, leaving comparatively little money left for the donor. Because the mainstream medical establishment is barred from participating in the transplantation, the procedure typically occurs in substandard facilities and not according to best practices. Afterwards, the donors often do not receive important medical follow-up because they are afraid that their role in the crime will be discovered. There have also been reports of criminal gangs kidnapping people and illegally harvesting their organs for sale on the black market. Proponents of legalization argue that it will result in better medical care for donors and recipients alike, as well as larger payments to the donors.

Some critics challenge the proponents' assumptions that legalization will eliminate the black market for organs or its problems. For example, one scholar argues that once the organ trade became legalized in Iran, it did not end the under-the-table sales in organs.

== Arguments against legalization ==
Critics often argue that organ sales should remain prohibited because any market solution will take advantage of the poor. Specifically, they fear that a large financial incentive for donating organs will prove irresistible to individuals in extreme poverty: such individuals may feel like they have no choice but to agree to sell a kidney. Under these circumstances, the decision to sell cannot be regarded as truly voluntary. Critics of legalization argue that proponents exaggerate the impact that a market would have on the supply of organs. In particular, they note that legalized organ sales may "crowd out" altruistic donations.

Legalization of human organ trading has been opposed by a variety of human rights groups. One such group is Organs Watch, which was established by Nancy Scheper-Hughes – a medical anthropologist who was instrumental in exposing illegal international organ-selling rings. Scheper-Hughes is famous for her investigations, which have led to several arrests due to people from developing countries being forced or fooled into organ donations. Like the World Health Organization, Organs Watch seeks to protect and benefit the poverty-stricken individuals who participate in the illegal organ trade out of necessity.

Some opponents of markets adopt a paternalistic stance that prohibits organ sales on the grounds that the government has a duty to prevent harm to its citizens. Unlike the "coercion by poverty" line of argumentation discussed above, these critics do not necessarily question the validity of the donors' consent. Rather, they say that the dangers posed by donating an organ are too great to allow a person to voluntarily undertake them in exchange for money. As noted previously, critics of organ sales cite research suggesting that kidney sellers suffer serious consequences of the operation, faring far worse than altruistic kidney donors. Even if one assumes that kidney sellers will have similar outcomes to donors in a regulated market, one cannot ignore the fact that a nephrectomy is an invasive procedure that – by definition – inflicts some injury upon the patient. A similar argument focuses on the fact that selling a kidney involves the loss of something unique and essentially irreplaceable on the part of the donor.

Another criticism of legalized organ sales is that it objectifies human beings. This argument typically starts with the Kantian assumption that every human being is a creature of innate dignity, who must always be regarded as an end to itself and never just a means to an end. A market for organs would reduce body parts to commodities to be bought and sold. Critics argue that, by permitting such transactions, society would reduce the seller of the organ to an object of commerce – a mere means to an ends. Proponents of organ sales claim that this line of argument confuses the kidney with the whole person. Another argument against organ markets is that they will give rise to a pressure to sell organs which would harm all people (even those who did not participate directly in the market).

== Models for legalization ==
=== Erin Harris model ===
Ethicists Charles A. Erin and John Harris have proposed a much more heavily regulated model for organ transactions. Under this scheme, would-be sellers of organs do not contract with would-be recipients. Instead, a government agency would be the sole buyer of organs, paying a standard price set by law and then distributing the organs to its citizens. This safeguard is designed to prevent unscrupulous buyers from taking advantage of potential donors and to ensure that the benefits of the increased organ supply are not limited to the rich. Moreover, participation in the market would be confined to citizens of the state where the market is located, to prevent the unilateral movement of organs from developing nations to the developed world. Erin and Harris's model has been endorsed by a number of prominent advocates of organ markets.

=== Free market model ===
Many scholars advocate the implementation of a free market system to combat the organ shortage that helps drive illegal organ trade. The organ trade's illegal status creates a price ceiling for organs at zero dollars. This price ceiling affects supply and demand, creating a shortage of organs in the face of a growing demand. According to a report published by the Cato Institute, a US-based libertarian think tank, eliminating the price ceiling would eliminate the organ shortage. In the Journal of Economic Perspectives, Nobel laureate Gary Becker and Julio Elias estimated that a $31,700 compensation would provide enough kidneys for everyone on the wait list. The government could pay the compensation to guarantee equality. This would save public money, as dialysis for kidney failure patients is far more expensive.

However, other critics argue that such a free market system for organ trade would encourage organ theft through murder and neglect of sick individuals for financial gain. Advocates for the free market of organs counter these claims by saying that murder for financial gain already happens; sanctions against such acts exist to minimize their occurrence; and with proper regulation and law enforcement, such incidents in a legal organ trade could be minimized as well.

=== Other models ===
The incentivized Kidney Donation Model (IKDM) exists as an intermediate between complete Free Market Model and Erin Harris Model, with strong government regulation and rewards with free market approach to donations.

== Proposed solutions ==
There are several proposed solutions to increase the number of legally available human organs and reduce the growing illicit trade in these organs around the world. Policies of presumed consent have been successful in different countries, including Brazil, the United States, and many European countries. These policies can be either presumed consent (during life) or withdrawal (after death). In the category of withdrawal policies, organ donation is presumed after death, although it is possible to choose not to donate by submitting documents. Research has shown an increase of around 25 to 30% in the amount of organs available in countries with presumed consent policies.

== See also ==
- Black market
- Fetus Farming Prohibition Act
- Gurgaon kidney scandal
- Organ donation
- Organ donation in Israel
- Organ harvesting
