= Yehuda Hiss =

Israeli pathologist

- יהודה היס
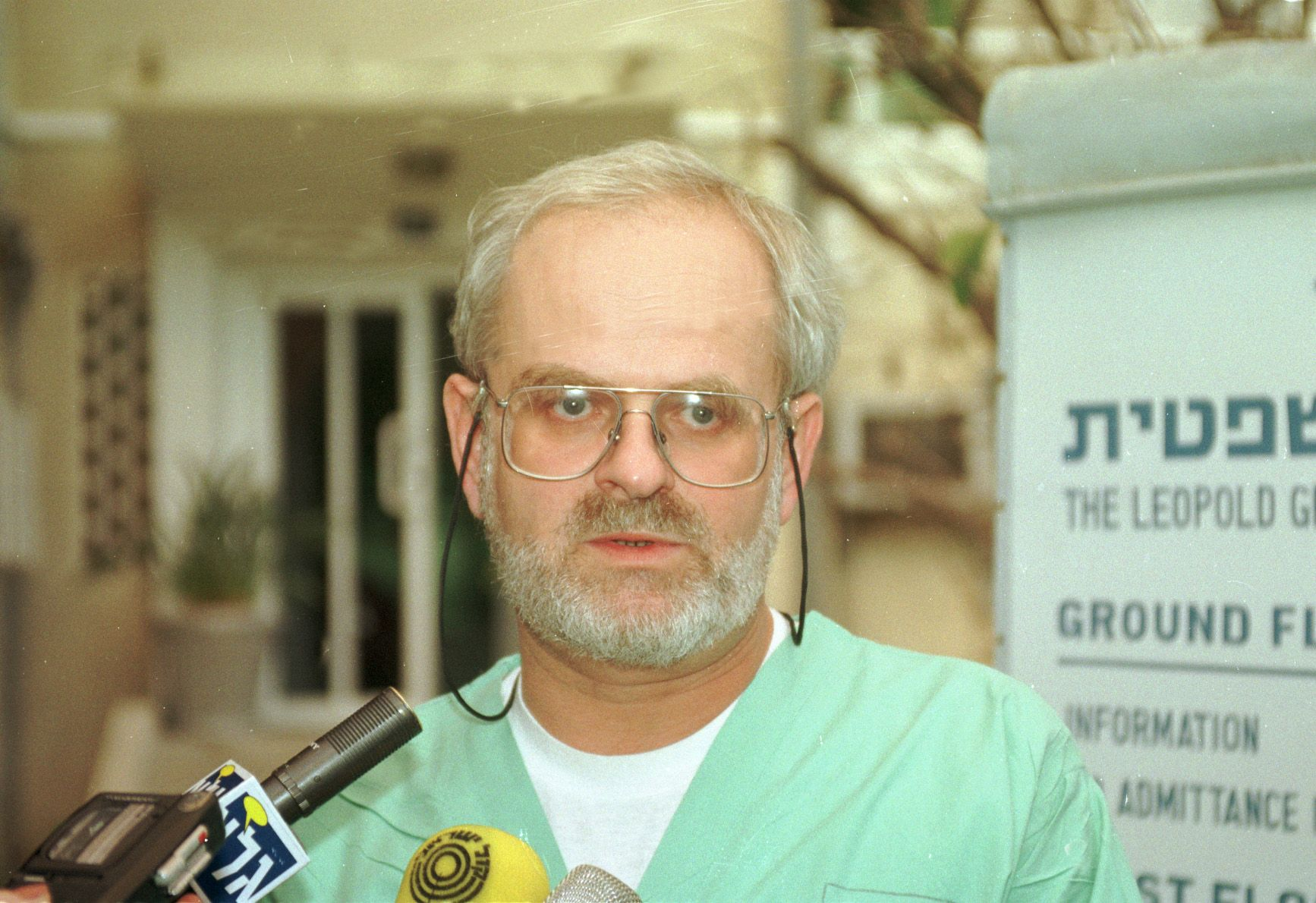
- Hiss in 1996
- Born: 1946 (age 79–80); Poland
- Medical career
- Profession: Pathologist
- Institutions: Abu Kabir Institute of Forensic Medicine, Israel

Yehuda Hiss (Hebrew: יהודה היס; born 1946) is a retired Israeli pathologist. He served as the Chief Pathologist at the Abu Kabir Institute of Forensic Medicine between 1988 and possibly as late as 2005. Hiss has also served as part of the faculty for the Terrorism and Medicine Program at the Institute for Counter-Terrorism (ICT) at IDC Herzliya and in the Department of Pathology for the Sackler Faculty of Medicine at Tel Aviv University.

As director of the Institute at Abu Kabir, the only place in Israel authorized to conduct autopsies in cases of unnatural death, Hiss conducted the autopsies of and authored the pathology reports for notable figures, including Yitzhak Rabin and Rachel Corrie, among others. His position as director was a subject of controversy. He was dismissed from this position after the legal system took up some of the charges against him. Investigations of the newspaper Al-Ahram, revealed that Hiss had removed organs, bones and other tissues from corpses, against the expressed wishes of family, and had sold many of the organs he removed to medical institutions and universities. He remained the chief pathologist of the Institute and regained his position as director before being dismissed by the Deputy Health Minister Yaakov Litzman on Oct 15 2012.

== Early life and education ==
Yehuda Hiss was born in Poland shortly after the end of World War II. His family immigrated to Israel when he was ten years old. He studied medicine in Israel, Italy, Austria, Britain and the United States.

== Medical career ==
Hiss became the director and chief pathologist at Abu Kabir in 1988. As director of the institute, Hiss was involved with high-profile cases. Hiss performed the autopsy on Yitzhak Rabin after his 1995 assassination; his report was challenged in March 1999 by a group of Israeli academics. In May 2003, he confirmed the identification of the body that washed ashore the beaches of Tel Aviv to be that of Omar Sharif, the accomplice of Asif Hanif, who carried out the Mike's Place suicide bombing the month previous. Hiss told Haaretz that Sharif's DNA was matched to samples provided by two British detectives and the cause of death was determined to be drowning. He also performed the autopsy on Rachel Corrie, an American woman killed by an Israeli bulldozer while attempting to protect a Palestinian home from being demolished.

A piece featuring Hiss that appeared in The New York Times in February 2004 noted Hiss played a "unique role" in the response network that Israel had to developed to deal with the more than 100 suicide bombings it had experienced over the three years previous. All the dead from such attacks are brought to the Forensic Institute, and Hiss had been present to attend to, "the dismembered victims and shattered victims," in all but one attack. The same article mentions the controversy surrounding Hiss as follows:

"While the forensic center is praised for its work after bombings, Dr. Hiss has been involved in controversies related to other cases, including allegations that the institute removed organs from corpses without permission from the families. The issue is enormously sensitive because of Judaism's emphasis on burying the whole body. Government inquiries have not resulted in any charges against Dr. Hiss. But in December the Israeli attorney general recommended disciplinary action. The issue is still under consideration, and no sanctions have been imposed so far."

In January 2006, following the carrying out of an autopsy that was ordered by the Israeli courts for a Haredi woman found murdered in her apartment, a riot by dozens of Haredim took place inside the institute where Hiss worked. According to Dr. Benny Davidson, the manager of the institute, "Even in the institute's darkest days, there wasn't an event this big. They wrecked the entire hall, broke expensive equipment, and destroyed (institute director) Yehuda Hiss' room. The public reaction to the articles on the pathological institute was an abandonment of Hiss."

== Controversy ==
According to Rebecca Dube in the Forward, allegations that Hiss and his lab were taking organs from corpses without permission and using them for research or selling them to medical schools were substantiated by the Israeli government. In 1998, Alistair Sinclair, a Scottish tourist apprehended on suspicion of dealing drugs, died in a holding cell at Ben Gurion International Airport, apparently having hanged himself. After an autopsy overseen by Hiss, the body was returned to his family; a second autopsy performed by pathologists at the University of Glasgow found that the heart and a small bone at the base of his tongue were missing. Jonathan Rosenblum reported that the missing bone from his neck was considered necessary to confirming that he had hanged himself as stated, and that the Sinclair family believed his heart had been used for transplant. The scandal was publicized by media in Israel and Scotland after the family sued.

Rosenblum, writing in The Jerusalem Post in October 2000 cited a 12-page investigative report in November 1999 by the local Tel Aviv newspaper Ha'ir claiming that medical students at Abu Kabir under Hiss' direction were allowed to practice on bodies sent there for autopsy, and body parts were transferred for transplant without permission from the families. In January 2001, Yediot Aharonot claimed the institute headed by Hiss had been involved in "organ sales" of body parts to universities and medical schools for research and training, citing evidence including the "price listings" for body parts.

Israel's Ministry of Health convened a committee to investigate the claims which found that Hiss had been involved for years in the sale of illegally removed body parts to medical schools. Hiss was never charged with any crime, but was forced to step down from running the state morgue in 2004. According to Rebecca Dube, "the final straw, apparently, was when the body of a youth killed in a road accident was gnawed upon by a rat in Hiss's lab." The state investigation revealed no proof of Hiss specifically targeting Palestinians and that "every body, whether Israeli or Palestinian, was fair game for organ harvesting."

Hiss ceased being the director of the institute in 2005 when allegations of a trade in organs resurfaced. After Hiss admitted to having removed parts from 125 bodies without authorization, and following a plea bargain with the State of Israel, Israel's attorney-general, decided not to press criminal charges. Hiss was given only a reprimand and continued to hold his position as chief pathologist at Abu Kabir and eventually regained his position as director.

Jonathan Cook writing in Al-Ahram Weekly in 2009 recalls Hiss' history in connection with the Aftonbladet allegations.

== Published works ==
- Corpora amylacea in mesothelioma of the atrioventricular node (1977), The Journal of Pathology (124: 2)
- Progressive spastic paraparesis, vitiligo, premature graying, and distinct facial appearance: A new genetic syndrome in 3 sibs (1981), American Journal of Medical Genetics (9:4)
- Sarcoidosis and Hashimoto's Thyroiditis - A Chance Occurrence? (1985), Respiration: International Journal of Thoracic Medicine (48:2)
- Does Prolonged Use of Diphenylhydantoin Predispose to Pulmonary Sarcoidosis? (1986), European Neurology (25:4)
- Hemoptysis as the presenting manifestation of sarcoidosis (June 1987), Chest (91:931b-931)
- The Feasibility of In Vivo Resection on the Left Lobe of the Liver and Its Use for Transplanation (July 1989), Transplantation (48:1)
- Intestinal Anastomosis Healing in Rat: Collagen Concentration and Histochemical Characterization by Picrosirius Red Staining and Polarizing Microscopy (June 1995), Experimental and Molecular Pathology (62:3)
- Immunohistochemical Localization of Gonadotropin and Gonadal Steroid Receptors in Human Pineal Glands (1997), The Journal of Clinical Endocrinology & Metabolism (82:3)
- Evidence for the involvement of the hippocampus in the pathophysiology of schizophrenia (September 2000), European Neuropsychopharmacology (10:5)
- Focal lymphocytic infiltration in aging human palatal salivary glands: a comparative study with labial salivary glands (January 2001), Journal of Oral Pathology & Medicine (30:1)
- Age-related changes in proliferative markers in labial salivary glands: a study of argyrophilic nucleolar organizer regions (AgNORs) and Ki-67 (June 2002), Experimental Gerontology (37:6)
- Age-related basement membrane thickening of the vocal cords in sudden infant death syndrome (SIDS) (January 2009), The Laryngoscope (104:7)
- "The Role of Forensic Anthropology in Mass Fatality Incidents Management". Forensic Science Policy and Management. 1 (3). August 2009.

== See also ==
- Health care in Israel

== Bibliography ==
- Cole, Leonard A. (2007). Terror: how Israel has coped and what America can learn. Indiana University Press. ISBN 978-0-253-34918-7.
