= Bachelet =

Bachelet (French pronunciation: [baʃ(ə)lɛ]) is a surname of French origin.

It may refer to:

- Alberto Bachelet (1922–1974), Chilean Brigadier General, father of Michelle Bachelet
- Alexandre Bachelet (1866–1945), French politician
- Alfred Bachelet (1864–1944), French composer
- Benoît Bachelet (born 1974), French ice hockey player
- Dominique Bachelet, American climate change scientist
- Dylan Bachelet (born 2004), British pastry chef and television personality
- Émile Bachelet (1863–1946), French inventor
- Ido Bachelet, Israeli musician and scientist
- Jean Bachelet (1894–1977), French cinematographer
- Melvin Bachelet (born 2003), French football player
- Michelle Bachelet (born 1951), former President of Chile and United Nations High Commissioner for Human Rights
- Pierre Bachelet (1944–2005), French singer-songwriter
- Théodore Bachelet (1820–1879), French historian and musicologist
- Vittorio Bachelet (1926–1980), Italian academic and politician
