= Kidnapping of Gadi Moses =

Israeli hostage taken by Hamas in 2023

Gadi Moshe Moses
- Part of the Gaza war hostage crisis
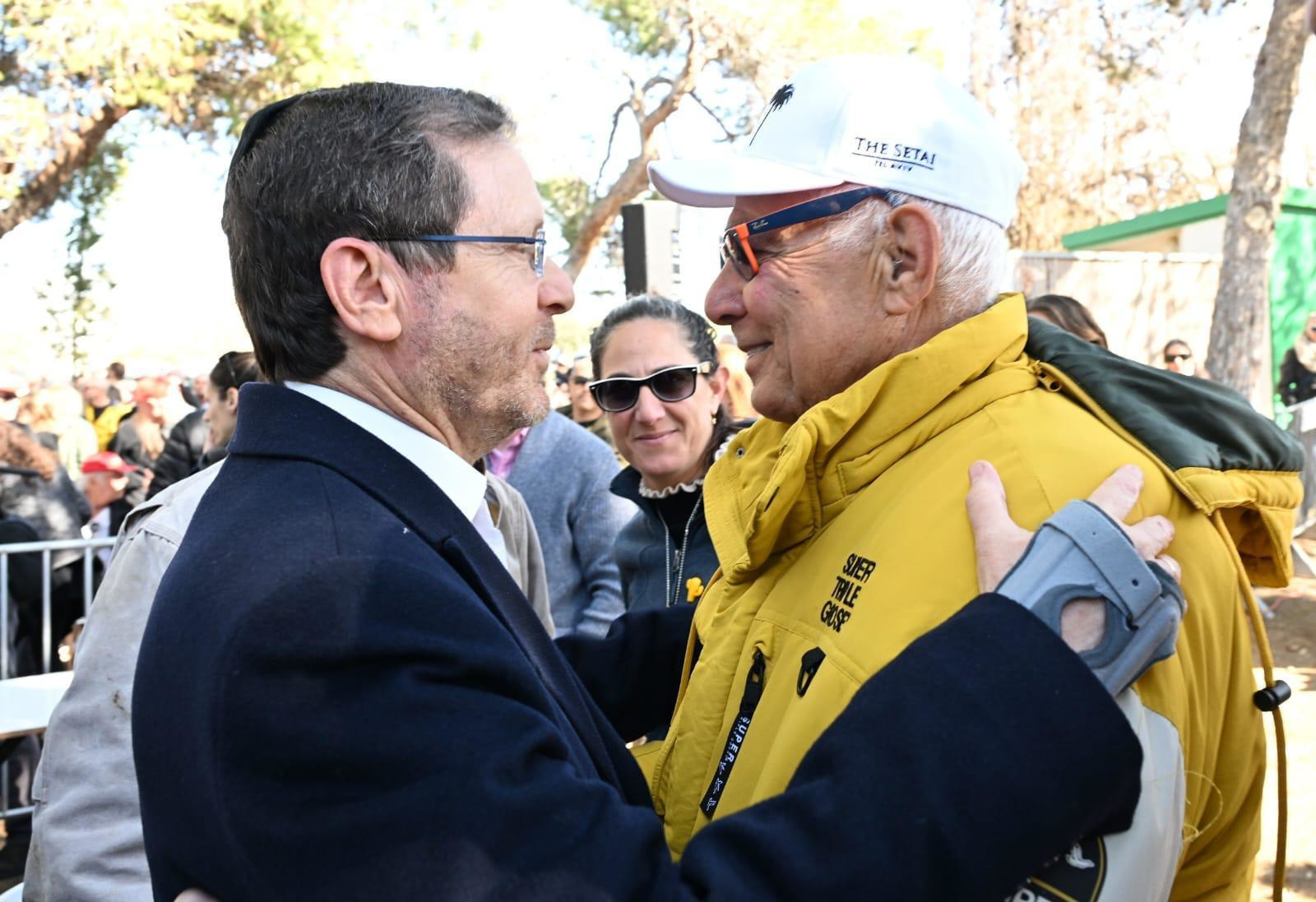
- Moses meeting Israeli president Isaac Herzog in February 2025
- Location: Nir Oz, Southern District, Israel
- Date: 7 October 2023 (kidnapping) – 26 February 2025 (release); 482 days held hostage
- Attack type: kidnapping, hostage taking
- Perpetrators: Hamas, Palestinian Islamic Jihad

Gadi Moshe Moses (born March 12, 1944) is an Israeli citizen who was abducted from his home by Palestinian Islamic Jihad (PIJ) militants during the Nir Oz massacre on October 7, 2023. He was released after 482 days in captivity, as part of an agreement between Israel and Hamas. Moses is the oldest living male hostage released during the Gaza War.

== Early life ==
Moses was born and raised in Hadera, Israel, to a father who immigrated from Germany and a mother who immigrated from Turkey; he has one brother. His family was of low socioeconomic status, and his mother died of kidney failure when he was a young boy.

In his youth, Moses was active in the HaShomer HaTzair youth movement, and at the age of 20, he moved to Nir Oz as part of the movement's Tzabar core group. Moses later served as the movement's regional coordinator for the south of Israel. Moses worked in the agricultural sector, and in his capacity as an agronomist, he worked in several Third World countries, where he taught local farmers about irrigation and cultivation methods. As part of his work, he lived in Egypt, where he learned basic Arabic, a skill that served him during his captivity.

In 2007, Moses was among the founders of the Nir Oz Winery, together with Chaim Peri, Yoram Metzger, and Gideon Pa'ucker, who also served as a winemaker. During the October 7 attacks, Peri and Metzger were abducted to the Gaza Strip and later killed in captivity, while Pa'ucker was murdered in his home. Following the massacre (also referred to in Hebrew as ‘the Black Sabbath’), the winery's name was changed to "Pa'ucker Winery".

== Abduction ==
On the morning of October 7, 2023, Moses's home in Nir Oz was attacked by three PIJ militants. At the time, Moses’s partner, Efrat Katz, her daughter, and two granddaughters were also at the house. As Moses came to the front of the house to allow his family to hide, he was abducted to Gaza. Moses later recounted after his release that his abduction experience was "short compared to others" stating that he was quickly shoved on a motorbike between two men and taken across the border.

Katz reported the abduction over the kibbutz radio network shortly thereafter. About an hour later, Katz, her daughter, and her two granddaughters were abducted by a different PIJ cell. However, before reaching the Gaza Strip, Katz was killed by Israeli Defense Forces (IDF) fire. Efrat's daughter and two granddaughters were taken to Gaza as hostages, and were released in the first hostage deal in late November of 2023. Moses's ex-wife, Margalit, was also abducted from the kibbutz and released in the same first hostage deal. Later in the day of the abduction, a video was circulated showing Moses being led toward the Gaza Strip by PIJ operatives.

== Captivity ==
Throughout his captivity, Moses was held in ten different hideouts. During transfers between these locations, he was disguised with a keffiyeh and a walking stick to conceal his identity. He spent the last eight months of his captivity in Al-Mawasi, located in the south of the Gaza Strip. For most of this period, Moses was held separately from other hostages, including a period of 70 days in complete isolation during which he was kept in a dark apartment without direct guarding. Moses received meals only twice a day, and consequently lost 15 kilograms of weight during his captivity. While allowed to shave, Moses was permitted to bathe only once a week, with a cup and a bucket of lukewarm water. In the final months of his captivity, he was joined by two hostages of Thai nationality, but they could not communicate due to a lack of a common language.

Moses was referred to by his guards as "Haj" and was allowed to listen to the radio for a few minutes once a day. To maintain his mental and physical fitness, he wrote crossword puzzles, solved math exercises, and walked 5–15 kilometers a day, even though he was confined to small rooms that were sometimes dark. He also recounted singing the Israeli national anthem "Hatikvah" over and over again throughout the day.

During his captivity, Moses kept a diary, but the militants guarding him stole it while he was sleeping about a week before his release. Moses was brought into Gaza without his eyeglasses, which broke during the abduction, and without his hearing aid. Upon his request, his captors provided him with reading glasses and two books in English. Moses engaged in conversations with his captors about religion and explained to them the Jewish people's right to settle in the Land of Israel.

At the beginning of his captivity, his guards told him that Katz had been abducted to Gaza alive, as had his daughter, Moran, and her children, who also lived on the kibbutz. The militants claimed to know those who were guarding them and allowed him to "send" them messages on their birthdays through them. In December 2023, Moses listened to Israeli news on the radio and discovered that Katz was no longer alive Consequently, he began to fear for the lives of his daughter and her children. This fear intensified after he heard on the radio, on the anniversary of the October 7 attacks, about the murder of Tamar Kedem Siman Tov and her family, who lived next door to his daughter. After hearing this, Moses assumed they had also been murdered and only discovered they were alive upon his release from captivity.

Due to the fact that he was held alone for most of his captivity, no information about Moses was received from hostages who had been released before him. The only sign of life prior to his release was a video disseminated by PIJ, in which he was filmed alongside Elad Katzir, who was murdered a month later and whose body was returned to Israel in April 2024. After Moses's return, it was revealed that the video was filmed at Nasser Hospital, and that Moses had been interrogated that same day about his own service and the service of his children and grandchildren in the IDF. Moses recounted that his life was in danger after an IDF attack near an apartment where he was held, and that the force of the impact caused the windows to shatter.

== Release ==
Moses was released from PIJ captivity after 482 days, having discovered his anticipated release only the day before. He was released along with Arbel Yehud and five Thai hostages; female Field Intelligence Observer Agam Berger was also released that same day. Moses met Yehud only a few days before their release, and their meeting was filmed and circulated by the PIJ.

Before his release, the PIJ militants led Moses to a cemetery, where they showed him an open grave, which led him to believe he was about to be executed. After realizing this was merely a scare tactic, he was forced to film videos in which he claimed that his captors had treated him properly and served him delicious food.

In contrast to most of the hostages released in the January 2025 agreement between Israel and Hamas, the release of Moses, Yehud, and the Thai citizens did not involve a "release ceremony" orchestrated by the captors. On the day of their release, the hostages were led to the ruins of Yahya Sinwar's house, where they were handed over to the Red Cross. At that time, Gazans gathered around them, rocked the vehicle, and prevented them from leaving for about an hour. They were subsequently forced to walk through the crowd, which raised fears that they would be lynched before reaching the Red Cross vehicle.

Moses was the only Israeli man aged over 75, out of ten, who survived captivity.

== Post-release activities ==
On the day of his release, Moses declared that he would do everything in his power to rehabilitate and rebuild Nir Oz, and he has since taken an active part in this process. In a letter he published about a month after his release, he called upon the members of Nir Oz to work toward the kibbutz's rehabilitation and to return to their homes. In July 2025, Moses met with Benjamin Netanyahu during the prime minister's visit to the kibbutz and asked for assistance in removing bureaucratic obstacles and allocating budgets so that the community rehabilitation process could move forward.

After his release, Moses also called for the reburial of his partner Efrat Katz in Nir Oz, stating watching the casket being covered at the kibbutz felt like closing the circle and needed to keep moving forward.

Moses was also active in the fight for the return of the remaining hostages. In April 2025, he spoke at the Hostages Square in Tel Aviv, and called for an end to the Gaza War and the signing of a deal that would secure the release of all remaining hostages. He also spoke as part of the "Stories that Bind Us: Memory and Dialogue of October 7 at Heritage Sites" at the Iron Moulding Heritage Museum in March 2025.

== See also ==
- Kidnapping of Elkana Bohbot
- Kidnapping of Shoshan Haran
- Kidnapping of Evyatar David
- Bar Kupershtein
- Kidnapping of Avinatan Or
- Edan Alexander
- Omer Neutra
- Omer Shem Tov
- Eli Sharabi
- Kidnapping of Noa Argamani
