= Alex Dancyg =

Polish-born Israeli historian (1948–2024)

- אלכס דנציג
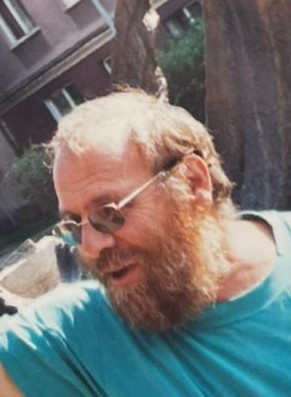
- Dancyg in 2000
- Born: 21 July 1948; Warsaw, Poland
- Died: 9 March 2024 (aged 75); Khan Yunis, Gaza Strip
- Awards: Medal of the Commission of National Education; Silver Cross of Merit; Jan Karski Eagle Award

Alexander Dancyg (Hebrew: אלכס דנציג; 21 July 1948 – 9 March 2024) was a Polish-born Israeli historian, Yad Vashem Institute contributor, farmer and an active advocate of Polish-Jewish dialogue. Dancyg was a member of Kibbutz Nir Oz and was kidnapped by Hamas militants, taken to the Gaza Strip during the Nir Oz attack and later killed in captivity during the Siege of Khan Yunis.

== Biography ==
Dancyg was born in Warsaw, Poland on 21 July 1948, to parents who were survivors of the Holocaust. He was born in Warsaw as the second child of Nina (Nycha) and Marcin (Mordechai) Dancyg. His father was a lawyer by profession, while his mother was a historian. His parents came from Warsaw, and spent the German occupation of World War II in the so-called Eastern Borderlands hiding under a false name: Danecki. Most of his father's family perished during the Holocaust. His father, Marcin Dancyg, was a Stalinist military judge in Polish People's Republic.

In 1957, he and his family immigrated to Israel, where he joined the Labor Zionist youth organisation Hashomer Hatzair, served in the Israel Defense Forces (IDF), including during several wars, and obtained a degree in history. He started a family on Kibbutz Nir-Oz, raising three children. In 1986, Dancyg returned to Poland for the first time in three decades and visited the Auschwitz death camp, which fuelled his interest in Holocaust education and the complicated Polish–Jewish relations of the post-Communist period.

In 1990, he started working with Yad Vashem, preparing tour guides chosen to accompany Israeli groups on their visits to Poland. His work at Yad Vashem also included lecturing and meeting educators and students from Poland and Israel. Dancyg led a program for 120 Israeli and Polish schools to meet together during Israeli school trips to Poland. He was a long-standing associate of the Yad Vashem Holocaust Martyrs' and Heroes' Remembrance Institute. Since 1990 he ran courses for guides taking care of groups of Israelis visiting Poland. He was also an associate of the Grodzka Gate – NN Theatre.

== Abduction by Hamas ==
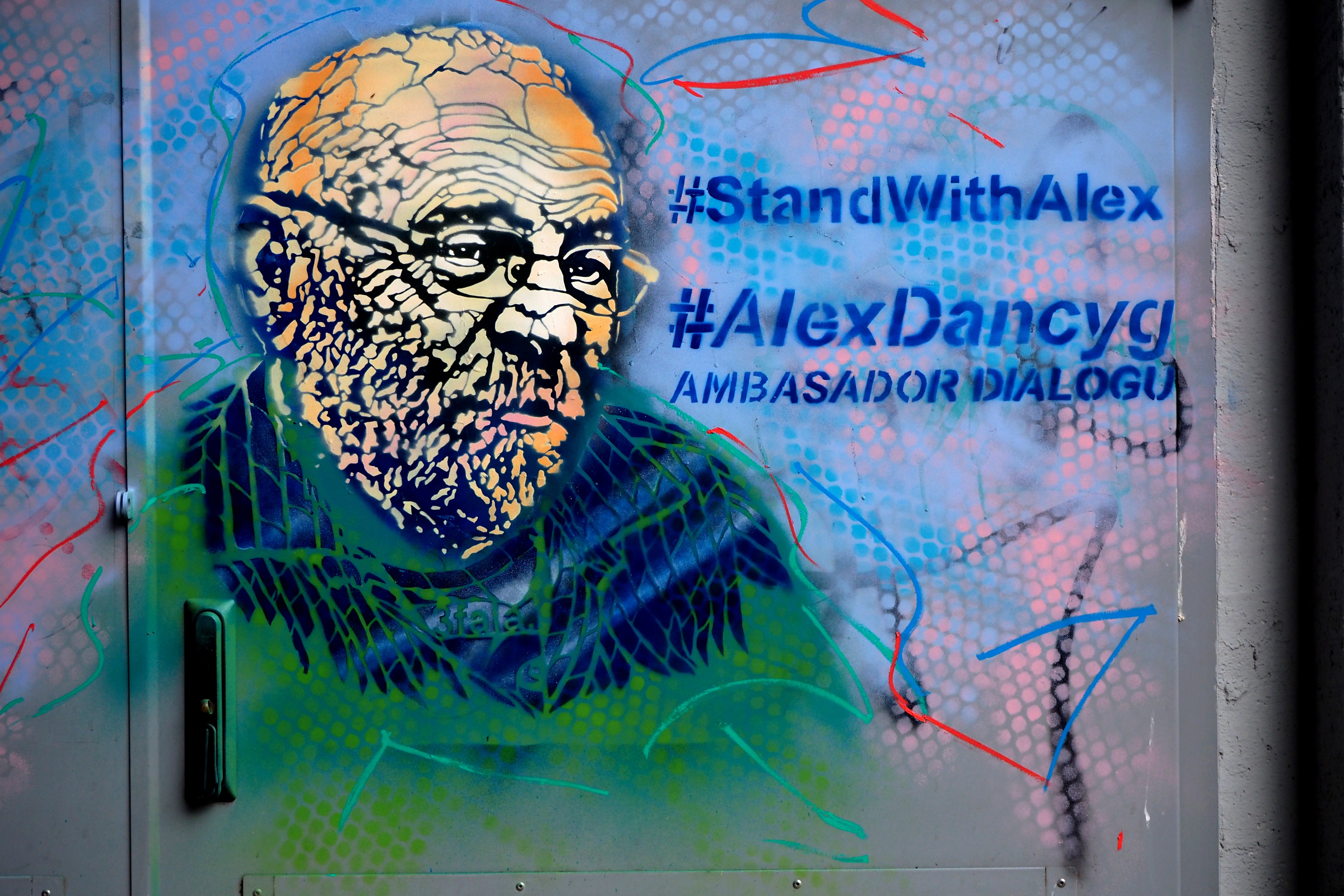
A mural of Alex Dancyg in Warsaw as part of the "StandWithAlex" campaign

On 7 October 2023, at the start of the Gaza war, Dancyg was kidnapped by Hamas militants from Kibbutz Nir-Oz. His son, Mati Dancyg, said Alex Dancyg's last communication was a text he sent to his other son, Yuval Dancyg, at approximately 8:30 am that morning, in which Dancyg told them about the situation in the kibbutz. Dancyg's son and grandchildren survived the attack by hiding in their own shelter. His ex-wife also survived, by holding her missile proof shelter door shut for seven hours, protecting her and her three grandchildren.

At the end of November 2023, one of the released hostages confirmed that Dancyg was alive. He was said to be regularly given medication and to be in good health. The released hostage also stated that Dancyg was giving history lectures to fellow hostages.

Murals with the hashtag "StandWithAlex" were painted in Warsaw as part of a campaign to build pressure for his release.

=== Reports of death ===
On 10 March 2024, reports of Danzig's death were shared by Izz ad-Din al-Qassam Brigades, the armed wing of Hamas; however, his death was not confirmed by Israeli forces or by his family. His son said in an interview with TVN that he did not believe the news of his father's death because he "does not believe a single word Hamas says." He also added: "Until recently, I imagined every day that when he regained his freedom I would hug him tightly. I don't do that anymore. I can't. I know that if he is alive, his condition may be grave. He may not be able to walk on his own". The Polish Ministry of Foreign Affairs also released a statement that it was unable to confirm the claims of Dancyg's death at the time.

On 22 July 2024, the IDF reported that Dancyg had been killed earlier in the year while being held by Hamas. After the announcement, The Jerusalem Post reported that it was "likely" they had been "mistakenly killed by IDF forces during battles in Khan Yunis some months ago". IDF confirmed that Dancyg died during the Siege of Khan Yunis, giving credibility to the announcement of Dancyg's death from Hamas on 9 March 2024.

=== Recovery of body ===
On 20 August 2024 the bodies of Dancyg and fellow hostages Yoram Metzger, Chaim Peri, Avraham Munder (also from Nir Oz), Yagev Buchshtab and Nadav Popplewell (from kibbutz Nirim) were recovered from a tunnel in Khan Younis. On 22 August, Israel announced that bullet wounds had been found in the bodies of all six hostages, claiming that they had been probably shot by their guards to prevent a rescue during fighting in Khan Younis earlier in the year.

== Political views ==
Dancyg described himself as a socialist. He was a staunch supporter of kibbutzim, which he regarded as an example of successful socialist communities. Remarking on his life in kibbutzes, Dancyg said: "I can live a peaceful, good, normal life without any stress. I have everything I need and my children also have everything they need, because the kibbutz is a rich society and can share equally for everyone, not equally to the centimetre, because that's not the point."

Described as an "idealistic kibbutznik and a flesh-and-blood socialist", Dancyg was an opponent of nationalism, and was known for his sharp critique of the Israeli right as well as Polish anti-Jewish phobias. Dancyg also participated in debates on religion, describing it as "a mystery that we cannot solve when we talk about the origin of the world and man." Dancyg had respect for the Catholic Church, and was a close friend of Polish priest and theologian Alfred Wierzbicki. When discussing religion, he was said to provocatively joke: "You, such an intelligent guy, and you haven't become a Jew yet!"

== Depiction in media ==
In 1999, a biographical documentary film devoted to Alex Dancyg was made, titled Reading Sienkiewicz in the Negev Desert. Directed by Krzysztof Bukowski, it received the "Bronze Hobby-Horse" Special Award at the National Short Film Festival in Kraków in 2000.

A Polish Radio reportage devoted to him, by Marta Rebzda, entitled Double Identity, was published in 2012.

In 2014, the Grodzka Gate - NN Theatre Centre published the second volume in the series Tales from the Gate entitled Dancyg (Lublin, ISBN 978-83-61064-57-2) containing a transcript of interviews with Alex Dancyg recorded as part of the Oral History Programme.

== Awards and honors ==
In 2013, the Chapter of the Polcul Foundation awarded him the Eudoxja Rakowska Prize for "his long-standing activity for the historical education of Israeli and Polish youth". In 2023, when he was held hostage by Hamas, he was awarded the title "Man of Reconciliation" by the Polish Council of Christians and Jews.

Dancyg received several awards, including the Medal of the Commission of National Education – the highest honor from the Polish Education Ministry – and the Silver Cross of Merit from the then-president of Poland, the late Lech Kaczyński. In 2024, he won the Jan Karski Eagle Special Award.
