= List of Gaza war hostages =

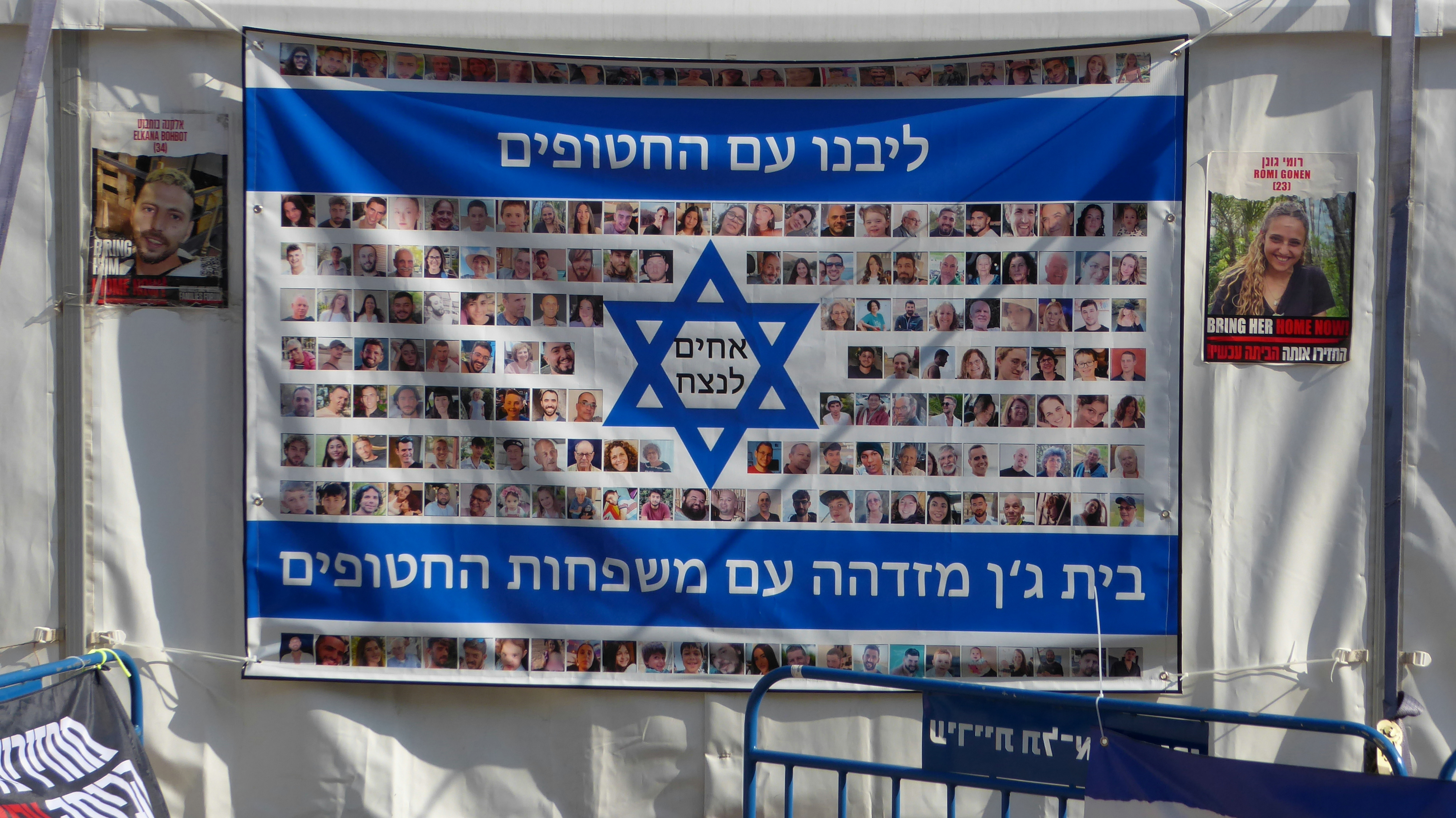
Israeli flag displaying photos of the hostages at Hostages Square, Tel Aviv, January 2024. Translation of the inscription on the flag: Top Row: "Our hearts go out to the hostages. Inside the Star of David: brothers forever. Bottom row: Bayt Jann sympathizes with the families of the hostages." (Note: Hebrew: ליבנו עם החטופים. אחים לנצח. בית ג'ן מזדהה עם משפחות החטופים)

Prior to the Gaza war breaking out on October 7, 2023, there were four Israeli citizens held hostage in the Gaza Strip: two of whom were alive, and two who were dead. During the October 7 attacks that started the Gaza war, 251 additional people were kidnapped and taken hostage to the Gaza Strip, most of whom were Israeli citizens. A total of 168 hostages were returned alive: eight were rescued, (Note: Seven of the eight were rescued in special rescue operations, and the eighth was rescued amidst ordinary military operations.) five were released outside of ceasefires, and the rest were released in ceasefires during the Gaza war. (Note: All hostages released during ceasefires were released as part of the ceasefire agreements with the following exceptions: during the 2023 Gaza war ceasefire, 23 Thai nationals and one Filipino were released outside of the framework of the ceasefire agreement. Additionally, dual Israeli-Russian national Roni Krivoi was released as a gesture towards Russian President Vladimir Putin outside of the ceasefire agreement. During the January 2025 Gaza war ceasefire, five Thai nationals were released outside of the ceasefire agreement.)

The last twenty living hostages were released on October 13, 2025 as part of the Gaza peace plan. The body of the last remaining hostage held in Gaza, Ran Gvili, was recovered on January 26, 2026.

In addition to the hostages kidnapped to the Gaza Strip, there were two hostage standoff situations inside Israel during the October 7 attacks, with a third attempt at a standoff thwarted when the victims managed to escape to the roof, where they were rescued. Both hostage situations were resolved in less than 24 hours. Of the seventeen people who were held hostage inside Israel, only four survived.

== Hostages held prior to the October 7 attacks ==
Four hostages were held in the Gaza Strip prior to the October 7 attacks: two IDF soldiers killed during the 2014 Gaza War, whose bodies were captured by Hamas; and two Israeli civilians abducted in 2014 and 2015 respectively, after wandering into the Gaza Strip. Israel wanted their inclusion in a unified hostage deal, along with the hostages taken in the October 7 attacks. The two civilians were released during the January 2025 Gaza war ceasefire, the body of one of the soldiers was recovered during a military operation a few hours before the ceasefire went into effect, and the body of the second soldier were returned by Hamas on 9 November 2025 as part of the Gaza peace plan.

| Name | Age when kidnapped | Nationality | Kidnapped from | Status | Date |
|---|---|---|---|---|---|
| Hisham al-Sayed | 27 | Israel | Crossed Gaza–Israel barrier on 20 April 2015 | Released within the framework of the January 2025 Gaza war ceasefire | 22 February 2025 |
| Avera Mengistu | 28 | Ethiopia; Israel | Crossed Gaza–Israel barrier on 7 September 2014 | Released within the framework of the January 2025 Gaza war ceasefire | 22 February 2025 |
| Hadar Goldin | 23 | Israel | Killed on 1 August 2014 during the 2014 Gaza War | Body returned within the framework of the Gaza peace plan | 9 November 2025 |
| Oron Shaul | 20 | Israel | Killed on 20 July 2014 during the 2014 Gaza war | Body recovered in a special military operation hours before the start of the January 2025 Gaza war ceasefire | 19 January 2025 |

== Hostages kidnapped to the Gaza Strip ==
=== Survived ===
The following are hostages who were released or rescued alive (sorted in reverse chronological order of return date and subsorted by last name): (Note: Unless otherwise noted, the basis of this list is from Haaretz.)

| Name | Age when kidnapped | Nationality | Kidnapped from | Status | Date |
|---|---|---|---|---|---|
| Matan Angrest | 20 | Israel; Bulgaria | Nahal Oz attack | Released within the framework of the Gaza peace plan | 13 October 2025 |
| Gali Berman | 26 | Israel Germany | Kfar Aza massacre | Released within the framework of the Gaza peace plan | 13 October 2025 |
| Ziv Berman | 26 | Israel Germany | Kfar Aza massacre | Released within the framework of the Gaza peace plan | 13 October 2025 |
| Elkana Bohbot | 34 | Israel; Colombia | Nova music festival | Released within the framework of the Gaza peace plan | 13 October 2025 |
| Rom Braslavski | 19 | Israel; Germany | Nova music festival | Released within the framework of the Gaza peace plan | 13 October 2025 |
| Nimrod Cohen | 19 | Israel | Near Kibbutz Nirim | Released within the framework of the Gaza peace plan | 13 October 2025 |
| Ariel Cunio | 26 | Argentina; Israel | Nir Oz attack | Released within the framework of the Gaza peace plan | 13 October 2025 |
| David Cunio | 33 | Argentina; Israel | Nir Oz attack | Released within the framework of the Gaza peace plan | 13 October 2025 |
| Evyatar David | 22 | Israel | Nova music festival | Released within the framework of the Gaza peace plan | 13 October 2025 |
| Guy Gilboa-Dalal | 22 | Israel | Nova music festival | Released within the framework of the Gaza peace plan | 13 October 2025 |
| Maxim Herkin | 35 | Israel; Russia; Ukraine | Nova music festival | Released within the framework of the Gaza peace plan | 13 October 2025 |
| Eitan Horn | 37 | Argentina; Israel | His brother's home in Nir Oz | Released within the framework of the Gaza peace plan | 13 October 2025 |
| Segev Kalfon | 25 | Israel | Nova music festival | Released within the framework of the Gaza peace plan | 13 October 2025 |
| Bar Kupershtein | 21 | Israel | Nova music festival | Released within the framework of the Gaza peace plan | 13 October 2025 |
| Omri Miran | 46 | Israel; Hungary | Nahal Oz attack | Released within the framework of the Gaza peace plan | 13 October 2025 |
| Eitan Mor | 23 | Israel | Nova music festival | Released within the framework of the Gaza peace plan | 13 October 2025 |
| Yosef Ohana | 23 | Israel | Nova music festival | Released within the framework of the Gaza peace plan | 13 October 2025 |
| Alon Ohel | 22 | Israel; Serbia; Germany | Nova music festival | Released within the framework of the Gaza peace plan | 13 October 2025 |
| Avinatan Or | 30 | Israel | Nova music festival | Released within the framework of the Gaza peace plan | 13 October 2025 |
| Matan Zangauker | 23 | Israel | Nir Oz attack | Released within the framework of the Gaza peace plan | 13 October 2025 |
| Edan Alexander | 19 | United States; Israel | Kissufim massacre | Released as part of a goodwill gesture by Hamas towards the Trump Administration | 12 May 2025 |
| Eliya Cohen | 26 | Israel | Nova music festival | Released within the framework of the January 2025 Gaza war ceasefire | 22 February 2025 |
| Omer Shem Tov | 20 | Israel | Nova music festival | Released within the framework of the January 2025 Gaza war ceasefire | 22 February 2025 |
| Tal Shoham | 38 | Israel; Austria; Italy | Be'eri massacre | Released within the framework of the January 2025 Gaza war ceasefire | 22 February 2025 |
| Omer Wenkert | 22 | Israel | Nova music festival | Released within the framework of the January 2025 Gaza war ceasefire | 22 February 2025 |
| Sagui Dekel-Chen | 35 | Israel; United States | Nir Oz | Released within the framework of the January 2025 Gaza war ceasefire | 15 February 2025 |
| Iair Horn | 45 | Argentina; Israel | Nir Oz | Released within the framework of the January 2025 Gaza war ceasefire | 15 February 2025 |
| Alexander Trufanov | 27 | Israel; Russia | Nir Oz | Released within the framework of the January 2025 Gaza war ceasefire | 15 February 2025 |
| Ohad Ben Ami | 54 | Israel; Germany | Be'eri massacre | Released within the framework of the January 2025 Gaza war ceasefire | 8 February 2025 |
| Or Levy | 33 | Israel | Nova music festival | Released within the framework of the January 2025 Gaza war ceasefire | 8 February 2025 |
| Eli Sharabi | 51 | Israel | Be'eri massacre | Released within the framework of the January 2025 Gaza war ceasefire | 8 February 2025 |
| Yarden Bibas | 33 | Argentina; Israel | Nir Oz attack | Released within the framework of the January 2025 Gaza war ceasefire | 1 February 2025 |
| Ofer Calderon | 52 | Israel; France; Portugal | Nir Oz attack | Released within the framework of the January 2025 Gaza war ceasefire | 1 February 2025 |
| Keith Siegel | 64 | Israel; United States | Kfar Aza massacre | Released within the framework of the January 2025 Gaza war ceasefire | 1 February 2025 |
| Agam Berger | 19 | Israel | Nahal Oz attack | Released within the framework of the January 2025 Gaza war ceasefire | 30 January 2025 |
| Gadi Moses | 79 | Israel; Germany | Nir Oz | Released within the framework of the January 2025 Gaza war ceasefire | 30 January 2025 |
| Surasak Rumnao | | Thailand | Yesha | Released within the framework of the January 2025 Gaza war ceasefire | 30 January 2025 |
| Bannawat Saethao | 27 | Thailand | Yesha | Released | 30 January 2025 |
| Watchara Sriaoun | 32 | Thailand | Nir Oz | Released within the framework of the January 2025 Gaza war ceasefire | 30 January 2025 |
| Sathian Suwannakham | 34 | Thailand | Nir Oz | Released within the framework of the January 2025 Gaza war ceasefire | 30 January 2025 |
| Pongsak Tanna | 35 | Thailand | Yesha | Released within the framework of the January 2025 Gaza war ceasefire | 30 January 2025 |
| Arbel Yehud | 28 | Israel; Germany | Nir Oz attack | Released within the framework of the January 2025 Gaza war ceasefire | 30 January 2025 |
| Liri Albag | 18 | Israel | Nahal Oz attack | Released within the framework of the January 2025 Gaza war ceasefire | 25 January 2025 |
| Karina Ariev | 19 | Israel | Nahal Oz attack | Released within the framework of the January 2025 Gaza war ceasefire | 25 January 2025 |
| Daniella Gilboa (Note: Gilboa's first name was originally Danielle prior to her abduction. Her parents decided to change her name to Daniella after she was taken hostage.) | 19 | Israel; Bulgaria | Nahal Oz attack | Released within the framework of the January 2025 Gaza war ceasefire | 25 January 2025 |
| Naama Levy | 19 | Israel | Nahal Oz attack | Released within the framework of the January 2025 Gaza war ceasefire | 25 January 2025 |
| Emily Damari | 27 | Israel; United Kingdom | Kfar Aza massacre | Released within the framework of the January 2025 Gaza war ceasefire | 19 January 2025 |
| Romi Gonen | 23 | Israel | Nova music festival | Released within the framework of the January 2025 Gaza war ceasefire | 19 January 2025 |
| Doron Steinbrecher | 30 | Israel; Romania | Kfar Aza massacre | Released within the framework of the January 2025 Gaza war ceasefire | 19 January 2025 |
| Qaid Farhan al-Qadi | 51 | Israel | Magen, Israel | Rescued during standard military operations | 27 August 2024 |
| Noa Argamani | 25 | Israel | Nova music festival | Rescued in a special military operation | 8 June 2024 |
| Andrey Kozlov | 27 | Israel; Russia | Nova music festival | Rescued in a special military operation | 8 June 2024 |
| Almog Meir Jan | 21 | Israel; Poland | Nova music festival | Rescued in a special military operation | 8 June 2024 |
| Shlomi Ziv | 40 | Israel | Nova music festival | Rescued in a special military operation | 8 June 2024 |
| Luis Har | 70 | Argentina; Israel | Clara Marman's home in Nir Yitzhak | Rescued in a special military operation | 12 February 2024 |
| Fernando Marman | 60 | Argentina; Israel | Clara Marman's home in Nir Yitzhak | Rescued in a special military operation | 12 February 2024 |
| Sapir Cohen | 29 | Israel | Nir Oz | Released under the framework of the 2023 Gaza war ceasefire (Note: The ceasefire agreement called for a four day ceasefire with the release of 50 hostages. The agreement had an option for an extension, with the release of 10 hostages for each extended day. Hence, all hostages released on days 5, 6, and 7 of the ceasefire (28th, 29th, and 30th of November) were released in the extension phase of the agreement) | 30 November 2023 |
| Shani Goren | 29 | Uruguay; Israel | Nir Oz | Released under the framework of the 2023 Gaza war ceasefire | 30 November 2023 |
| Ilana Gritzewsky | 30 | Mexico; Israel | Nir Oz | Released under the framework of the 2023 Gaza war ceasefire | 30 November 2023 |
| Nili Margalit | 41 | Israel | Nir Oz | Released under the framework of the 2023 Gaza war ceasefire | 30 November 2023 |
| Mia Schem | 21 | Israel; France | Nova music festival | Released under the framework of the 2023 Gaza war ceasefire | 30 November 2023 |
| Amit Soussana | 40 | Israel | Kfar Aza massacre | Released under the framework of the 2023 Gaza war ceasefire | 30 November 2023 |
| Aisha Ziyadne | 17 | Israel | Holit | Released under the framework of the 2023 Gaza war ceasefire | 30 November 2023 |
| Bilal Ziyadne | 18 | Israel | Holit | Released under the framework of the 2023 Gaza war ceasefire | 30 November 2023 |
| Liat Atzili | 49 | Israel; United States | Nir Oz attack | Released under the framework of the 2023 Gaza war ceasefire | 29 November 2023 |
| Raz Ben Ami | 56 | Israel; Germany | Be'eri | Released under the framework of the 2023 Gaza war ceasefire | 29 November 2023 |
| Ofir Engel | 17 | Israel; Netherlands | Be'eri | Released under the framework of the 2023 Gaza war ceasefire | 29 November 2023 |
| Liam Or | 18 | Israel | Re'im | Released under the framework of the 2023 Gaza war ceasefire | 29 November 2023 |
| Phaiboon Ratnin | 42 | Thailand | | Released during the 2023 Gaza war ceasefire under a sepearate agreement between Hamas and Thailand | 29 November 2023 |
| Itay Regev | 18 | Israel | Nova music festival | Released under the framework of the 2023 Gaza war ceasefire | 29 November 2023 |
| Yarden Roman-Gat | 35 | Israel; Germany | Be'eri massacre | Released under the framework of the 2023 Gaza war ceasefire | 29 November 2023 |
| Raya Rotem | 54 | Israel | Be'eri massacre | Released under the framework of the 2023 Gaza war ceasefire | 29 November 2023 |
| Gong Sae Lao | 26 | Thailand | Khirbet Mador | Released during the 2023 Gaza war ceasefire under a sepearate agreement between Hamas and Thailand | 29 November 2023 |
| Charoemchai Saengkaew | | Thailand | Alumim massacre | Released during the 2023 Gaza war ceasefire under a sepearate agreement between Hamas and Thailand | 29 November 2023 |
| Lakkapan Seekena | | Thailand | Alumim massacre | Released during the 2023 Gaza war ceasefire under a sepearate agreement between Hamas and Thailand | 29 November 2023 |
| Amit Shani | 15 | Israel; Germany | Be'eri massacre | Released under the framework of the 2023 Gaza war ceasefire | 29 November 2023 |
| Gali Tarshansky | 13 | Israel | Be'eri massacre | Released under the framework of the 2023 Gaza war ceasefire | 29 November 2023 |
| Irena Tatti | 73 | Israel; Russia | Nir Oz attack | Released under the framework of the 2023 Gaza war ceasefire | 29 November 2023 |
| Yelena Trufanov | 50 | Israel; Russia | Nir Oz attack | Released under the framework of the 2023 Gaza war ceasefire | 29 November 2023 |
| Moran Stella Yanai | 40 | Israel | Nova music festival | Released under the framework of the 2023 Gaza war ceasefire | 29 November 2023 |
| Noralyn Babadilla | 60 | Philippines; Israel | Nirim | Released under the framework of the 2023 Gaza war ceasefire | 28 November 2023 |
| Ditza Heiman | 84 | Israel | Nir Oz attack | Released under the framework of the 2023 Gaza war ceasefire | 28 November 2023 |
| Rimon Kirsht-Buchshtab | 36 | Israel; Germany | Nirim attack | Released under the framework of the 2023 Gaza war ceasefire | 28 November 2023 |
| Gabriela Leimberg | 59 | Argentina; Israel | Nir Yitzhak attack | Released under the framework of the 2023 Gaza war ceasefire | 28 November 2023 |
| Mia Leimberg | 17 | Argentina; Israel | Nir Yitzhak attack | Released under the framework of the 2023 Gaza war ceasefire | 28 November 2023 |
| Clara Marman | 62 | Argentina; Israel | Nir Yitzhak attack | Released under the framework of the 2023 Gaza war ceasefire | 28 November 2023 |
| Tamar Metzger | 78 | Israel | Nir Oz attack | Released under the framework of the 2023 Gaza war ceasefire | 28 November 2023 |
| Ofelia Roitman | 77 | Argentina; Israel | Nir Oz attack | Released under the framework of the 2023 Gaza war ceasefire | 28 November 2023 |
| Ada Sagi | 74 | Israel | Nir Oz attack | Released under the framework of the 2023 Gaza war ceasefire | 28 November 2023 |
| Owat Suriyasri | 40 | Thailand | | Released during the 2023 Gaza war ceasefire under a sepearate agreement between Hamas and Thailand | 28 November 2023 |
| Meirav Tal | 54 | Israel | Nir Oz attack | Released under the framework of the 2023 Gaza war ceasefire | 28 November 2023 |
| Pattanayut Tonsakree | | Thailand | | Released during the 2023 Gaza war ceasefire under a sepearate agreement between Hamas and Thailand | 28 November 2023 |
| Emma Cunio | 3 | Argentina; Israel | Nir Oz attack | Released under the framework of the 2023 Gaza war ceasefire | 27 November 2023 |
| Yuli Cunio | 3 | Argentina; Israel | Nir Oz attack | Released under the framework of the 2023 Gaza war ceasefire | 27 November 2023 |
| Sharon Aloni Cunio | 34 | Argentina; Israel | Nir Oz attack | Released under the framework of the 2023 Gaza war ceasefire | 27 November 2023 |
| Mika Engel | 18 | Argentina; Israel | Nir Oz attack | Released under the framework of the 2023 Gaza war ceasefire | 27 November 2023 |
| Yuval Engel | 11 | Argentina; Israel | Nir Oz attack | Released under the framework of the 2023 Gaza war ceasefire | 27 November 2023 |
| Karina Engelbert | 51 | Argentina; Israel | Nir Oz attack | Released under the framework of the 2023 Gaza war ceasefire | 27 November 2023 |
| Erez Kalderon | 11 | Israel; France | Nir Oz attack | Released under the framework of the 2023 Gaza war ceasefire | 27 November 2023 |
| Sahar Kalderon | 16 | Israel; France | Nir Oz attack | Released under the framework of the 2023 Gaza war ceasefire | 27 November 2023 |
| Or Yaakov | 16 | Israel; Germany | Nir Oz attack | Released under the framework of the 2023 Gaza war ceasefire | 27 November 2023 |
| Yagil Yaakov | 12 | Israel; Germany | Nir Oz attack | Released under the framework of the 2023 Gaza war ceasefire | 27 November 2023 |
| Eitan Yahalomi | 12 | Israel; France | Nir Oz | Released under the framework of the 2023 Gaza war ceasefire | 27 November 2023 |
| Elma Avraham | 84 | Israel | Nahal Oz attack | Released under the framework of the 2023 Gaza war ceasefire | 26 November 2023 |
| Hagar Brodetz | 40 | Israel | Kfar Aza massacre | Released under the framework of the 2023 Gaza war ceasefire | 26 November 2023 |
| Ofri Brodetz | 9 | Israel | Kfar Aza massacre | Released under the framework of the 2023 Gaza war ceasefire | 26 November 2023 |
| Oriya Brodetz | 4 | Israel | Kfar Aza massacre | Released under the framework of the 2023 Gaza war ceasefire | 26 November 2023 |
| Yuval Brodetz | 9 | Israel | Kfar Aza massacre | Released under the framework of the 2023 Gaza war ceasefire | 26 November 2023 |
| Dafna Elyakim | 15 | Israel | Nahal Oz attack | Released under the framework of the 2023 Gaza war ceasefire | 26 November 2023 |
| Ella Elyakim | 8 | Israel | Nahal Oz attack | Released under the framework of the 2023 Gaza war ceasefire | 26 November 2023 |
| Agam Goldstein-Almog | 17 | Israel | Kfar Aza massacre | Released under the framework of the 2023 Gaza war ceasefire | 26 November 2023 |
| Gal Goldstein-Almog | 11 | Israel | Kfar Aza massacre | Released under the framework of the 2023 Gaza war ceasefire | 26 November 2023 |
| Tal Goldstein-Almog | 9 | Israel | Kfar Aza massacre | Released under the framework of the 2023 Gaza war ceasefire | 26 November 2023 |
| Chen Goldstein-Almog | 48 | Israel | Kfar Aza massacre | Released under the framework of the 2023 Gaza war ceasefire | 26 November 2023 |
| Avigail Idan | 3 | Israel; United States | Kfar Aza massacre | Released under the framework of the 2023 Gaza war ceasefire | 26 November 2023 |
| Surin Kesungnoen | | Thailand | | Released during the 2023 Gaza war ceasefire under a sepearate agreement between Hamas and Thailand | 26 November 2023 |
| Roni Krivoi | 25 | Israel; Russia | Nova music festival | Released during the 2023 Gaza war ceasefire as a gesture of goodwill towards Vladimir Putin | 26 November 2023 |
| Pornsawan Pinakalo | 30 | Thailand | Alumim massacre | Released during the 2023 Gaza war ceasefire under a sepearate agreement between Hamas and Thailand | 26 November 2023 |
| Aviva Siegel | 62 | Israel; United States; South Africa | Kfar Aza massacre | Released under the framework of the 2023 Gaza war ceasefire | 26 November 2023 |
| Wichian Temthon | 37 | Thailand | Kfar Aza massacre | Released during the 2023 Gaza war ceasefire under a sepearate agreement between Hamas and Thailand | 26 November 2023 |
| Anucha Angkaew | 28 | Thailand | Re'im | Released during the 2023 Gaza war ceasefire under a sepearate agreement between Hamas and Thailand | 25 November 2023 |
| Noam Avigdori | 12 | Israel; Germany | Be'eri massacre | Released under the framework of the 2023 Gaza war ceasefire | 25 November 2023 |
| Sharon Avigdori | 52 | Israel; Germany | Be'eri massacre | Released under the framework of the 2023 Gaza war ceasefire | 25 November 2023 |
| Manee Chirachat | 29 | Thailand | Re'im | Released during the 2023 Gaza war ceasefire under a sepearate agreement between Hamas and Thailand | 25 November 2023 |
| Khomkrit Chombua | 29 | Thailand | Re'im | Released during the 2023 Gaza war ceasefire under a sepearate agreement between Hamas and Thailand | 25 November 2023 |
| Emily Hand | 8 | Israel; Ireland | Be'eri massacre | Released under the framework of the 2023 Gaza war ceasefire | 25 November 2023 |
| Shoshan Haran | 67 | Israel; Germany | Be'eri massacre | Released under the framework of the 2023 Gaza war ceasefire | 25 November 2023 |
| Natthaporn Onkeaw | 26 | Thailand | Re'im | Released during the 2023 Gaza war ceasefire under a sepearate agreement between Hamas and Thailand | 25 November 2023 |
| Alma Or | 13 | Israel | Be'eri massacre | Released under the framework of the 2023 Gaza war ceasefire | 25 November 2023 |
| Noam Or | 17 | Israel | Be'eri massacre | Released under the framework of the 2023 Gaza war ceasefire | 25 November 2023 |
| Maya Regev | 21 | Israel | Nova music festival | Released under the framework of the 2023 Gaza war ceasefire | 25 November 2023 |
| Hila Rotem-Shoshani | 12 | Israel | Be'eri massacre | Released under the framework of the 2023 Gaza war ceasefire | 25 November 2023 |
| Adi Shoham | 38 | Israel; Germany | Be'eri massacre | Released under the framework of the 2023 Gaza war ceasefire | 25 November 2023 |
| Nave Shoham | 8 | Israel; Germany | Be'eri massacre | Released under the framework of the 2023 Gaza war ceasefire | 25 November 2023 |
| Yahel Shoham | 3 | Israel; Germany | Be'eri massacre | Released under the framework of the 2023 Gaza war ceasefire | 25 November 2023 |
| Noga Weiss | 18 | Israel; Hungary | Be'eri massacre | Released under the framework of the 2023 Gaza war ceasefire | 25 November 2023 |
| Shiri Weiss | 53 | Israel | Be'eri massacre | Released under the framework of the 2023 Gaza war ceasefire | 25 November 2023 |
| Yaffa Adar | 85 | Israel | Nir Oz attack | Released under the framework of the 2023 Gaza war ceasefire | 24 November 2023 |
| Danielle Aloni | 44 | Israel | Nir Oz attack | Released under the framework of the 2023 Gaza war ceasefire | 24 November 2023 |
| Emilia Aloni | 5 | Israel | Nir Oz attack | Released under the framework of the 2023 Gaza war ceasefire | 24 November 2023 |
| Santi Boonphrom | | Thailand | Nir Oz attack | Released during the 2023 Gaza war ceasefire under a sepearate agreement between Hamas and Thailand | 24 November 2023 |
| Wichai Kalapat | 28 | Thailand | Nir Oz attack | Released during the 2023 Gaza war ceasefire under a sepearate agreement between Hamas and Thailand | 24 November 2023 |
| Aviv Katz-Asher | 2 | Israel; Germany | Nir Oz attack | Released under the framework of the 2023 Gaza war ceasefire | 24 November 2023 |
| Doron Katz-Asher | 34 | Israel; Germany | Nir Oz attack | Released | 24 November 2023 |
| Raz Katz-Asher | 4 | Israel; Germany | Nir Oz attack | Released under the framework of the 2023 Gaza war ceasefire | 24 November 2023 |
| Hanna Katzir (Note: Katzir died 13 months after her release. Her death was attributed to "medical complications from her time as a hostage".) | 76 | Israel | Nir Oz attack | Released under the framework of the 2023 Gaza war ceasefire | 24 November 2023 |
| Bancha Kongmanee | | Thailand | Nir Oz attack | Released during the 2023 Gaza war ceasefire under a sepearate agreement between Hamas and Thailand | 24 November 2023 |
| Natthawaree Mulkan | 35 | Thailand | Be'eri massacre | Released during the 2023 Gaza war ceasefire under a sepearate agreement between Hamas and Thailand | 24 November 2023 |
| Margalit Moses | | Israel; Germany | Nir Oz attack | Released under the framework of the 2023 Gaza war ceasefire | 24 November 2023 |
| Adina Moshe | 72 | Israel; Portugal | Nir Oz attack | Released under the framework of the 2023 Gaza war ceasefire | 24 November 2023 |
| Keren Munder | 54 | Israel | Parents home in Nir Oz attack | Released under the framework of the 2023 Gaza war ceasefire | 24 November 2023 |
| Ohad Munder | 8 | Israel | Grandparents home in Nir Oz attack | Released under the framework of the 2023 Gaza war ceasefire | 24 November 2023 |
| Ruth Munder | 78 | Israel | Nir Oz attack | Released under the framework of the 2023 Gaza war ceasefire | 24 November 2023 |
| Jimmy Pacheco | 33 | Philippines | Nir Oz attack | Released during the 2023 Gaza war ceasefire, but not under the framework of the ceasefire agreement | 24 November 2023 |
| Channah Peri | 79 | Israel; South Africa | Nirim attack | Released under the framework of the 2023 Gaza war ceasefire | 24 November 2023 |
| Mongkhol Phajuabboon | | Thailand | Nir Oz attack | Released during the 2023 Gaza war ceasefire under a sepearate agreement between Hamas and Thailand | 24 November 2023 |
| Boonthom Phankhong | 45 | Thailand | Nir Oz attack | Released during the 2023 Gaza war ceasefire under a sepearate agreement between Hamas and Thailand | 24 November 2023 |
| Withoon Phumee | 33 | Thailand | Nir Oz attack | Released during the 2023 Gaza war ceasefire under a sepearate agreement between Hamas and Thailand | 24 November 2023 |
| Buddee Saengbun | | Thailand | Nir Oz attack | Released during the 2023 Gaza war ceasefire under a sepearate agreement between Hamas and Thailand | 24 November 2023 |
| Uthai Sangnuan | | Thailand | Nir Oz attack | Released during the 2023 Gaza war ceasefire under a sepearate agreement between Hamas and Thailand | 24 November 2023 |
| Uthai Thunsri | | Thailand | Nir Oz attack | Released during the 2023 Gaza war ceasefire under a sepearate agreement between Hamas and Thailand | 24 November 2023 |
| Ori Megidish | | Israel | Nahal Oz attack | Rescued in a special military operation | 30 October 2023 |
| Nurit Cooper | 79 | Israel | Nir Oz attack | Released | 23 October 2023 |
| Yocheved Lifshitz | 85 | Israel | Nir Oz attack | Released | 23 October 2023 |
| Judith Raanan | 59 | United States; Israel | Nahal Oz attack | Released | 20 October 2023 |
| Natalie Raanan | 17 | United States; Israel | Nahal Oz attack | Released | 20 October 2023 |

=== Deceased ===
The following are hostages whose bodies were recovered by the IDF (48), returned by Hamas (34), or retrieved during a failed military operation (3):

| Name | Birthdate and Age when kidnapped | Nationality | Kidnapped from | Status | Date | Death date |
|---|---|---|---|---|---|---|
| Ran Gvili | 11 February 1999 (aged 24) | Israel | Alumim massacre | Recovered in a special military operation | 26 January 2026 | 7 October 2023 |
| Sudthisak Rinthalak | | Thailand | Be'eri massacre | Returned within the framework of the Gaza peace plan | 3 December 2025 | 7 October 2023 |
| Dror Or | 10 January 1975 (aged 48) | Israel; Portugal | Be'eri massacre | Returned within the framework of the Gaza peace plan | 25 November 2025 | 7 October 2023 |
| Meni Godard | 18 August 1950 (aged 73) | Israel | Be'eri massacre | Returned within the framework of the Gaza peace plan | 13 November 2025 | 7 October 2023 |
| Lior Rudaeff | 19 July 1962 (aged 61) | Argentina; Israel | Nir Yitzhak attack | Returned within the framework of the Gaza peace plan | 7 November 2025 | 7 October 2023 |
| Joshua Luito Mollel | 18 May 2002 (aged 21) | Tanzania | Nahal Oz attack | Returned within the framework of the Gaza peace plan | 5 November 2025 | 7 October 2023 |
| Itay Hen | 1 February 2004 (aged 19) | Israel; United States; Germany | Nahal Oz attack | Returned within the framework of the Gaza peace plan | 4 November 2025 | 7 October 2023 |
| Oz Daniel | 8 March 2004 (aged 19) | Israel | Near Kibbutz Nirim | Returned within the framework of the Gaza peace plan | 2 November 2025 | 7 October 2023 |
| Asaf Hamami | 2 December 1982 (aged 40) | Israel | Killed during Nirim attack | Returned within the framework of the Gaza peace plan | 2 November 2025 | 7 October 2023 |
| Omer Neutra | 14 October 2001 (aged 21) | Israel; United States | Near Kibbutz Nirim | Returned within the framework of the Gaza peace plan | 2 November 2025 | 7 October 2023 |
| Sahar Baruch | 25 November 1998 (aged 24) | Israel; Bulgaria | Be'eri massacre | Returned within the framework of the Gaza peace plan | 30 October 2025 | 8 December 2023 |
| Amiram Cooper | 10 December 1938 (aged 84) | Israel; Poland | Nir Oz attack | Returned within the framework of the Gaza peace plan | 30 October 2025 | Before; 3 June 2024 |
| Tamir Adar | 29 June 1985 (aged 38) | Israel; Germany | Nir Oz attack | Returned within the framework of the Gaza peace plan | 21 October 2025 | 7 October 2023 |
| Arye Zalmanovich | 5 April 1938 (aged 85) | Israel | Nir Oz attack | Returned within the framework of the Gaza peace plan | 21 October 2025 | November 2023 |
| Tal Haimi | 20 December 1981 (aged 41) | Israel; Romania | Nir Yitzhak attack | Returned within the framework of the Gaza peace plan | 20 October 2025 | 7 October 2023 |
| Ronen Engel | 21 March 1969 (aged 54) | Argentina; Israel | Nir Oz attack | Returned within the framework of the Gaza peace plan | 18 October 2025 | 7 October 2023 |
| Sonthaya Oakkharasri | 16 May 1993 (aged 30) | Thailand | Be'eri massacre | Returned within the framework of the Gaza peace plan | 18 October 2025 | 7 October 2023 |
| Eliyahu Margalit | 27 October 1947 (aged 75) | Israel | Nir Oz | Returned within the framework of the Gaza peace plan | 17 October 2025 | 7 October 2023 |
| Muhammad El-Atrash | 26 February 1984 (aged 39) | Israel | | Returned within the framework of the Gaza peace plan | 15 October 2025 | 7 October 2023 |
| Inbar Haiman | 15 January 1996 (aged 27) | Israel | Nova music festival | Returned within the framework of the Gaza peace plan | 15 October 2025 | 7 October 2023 |
| Tamir Nimrodi | 15 November 2004 (aged 18) | Israel; Germany | Near Erez Crossing | Returned within the framework of the Gaza peace plan | 14 October 2025 | 9 October 2023 |
| Uriel Baruch | 30 November 1988 (aged 34) | Israel | Nova music festival | Returned within the framework of the Gaza peace plan | 14 October 2025 | 7 October 2023 |
| Eitan Levy | 24 February 1970 (aged 53) | Israel | Be'eri massacre | Returned within the framework of the Gaza peace plan | 14 October 2025 | 7 October 2023 |
| Guy Iluz | 6 July 1997 (aged 26) | Israel | Nova music festival | Returned within the framework of the Gaza peace plan | 13 October 2025 | Before; 1 December 2023 |
| Bipin Joshi | 26 October 2000 (aged 22) | Nepal | Alumim massacre | Returned within the framework of the Gaza peace plan | 13 October 2025 | Late 2023 |
| Daniel Perez | 3 May 2001 (aged 22) | Israel; South Africa | Nahal Oz attack | Returned within the framework of the Gaza peace plan | 13 October 2025 | 7 October 2023 |
| Yossi Sharabi | 16 September 1970 (aged 53) | Israel; Portugal | Be'eri massacre | Returned within the framework of the Gaza peace plan | 13 October 2025 | 10 January 2024 |
| Idan Shtivi | 6 June 1995 (aged 28) | Israel; Portugal | Nova music festival | Recovered | 29 August 2025 | 7 October 2023 |
| Ilan Weiss | 3 November 1967 (aged 55) | Israel; Hungary | Be'eri massacre | Recovered | 29 August 2025 | 7 October 2023 |
| Ofra Keidar | 2 September 1953 (aged 70) | Israel | Be'eri massacre | Recovered | 22 June 2025 | 7 October 2023 |
| Shay Levinson | 19 June 2004 (aged 19) | Israel; Germany | Nahal Oz attack | Recovered | 22 June 2025 | 7 October 2023 |
| Yonatan Samerano | 5 June 2002 (aged 21) | Israel | Nova music festival | Recovered | 22 June 2025 | 7 October 2023 |
| Aviv Atzili | 29 June 1974 (aged 49) | Israel | Nir Oz attack | Recovered | 11 June 2025 | 7 October 2023 |
| Yair Yaakov | 29 September 1964 (aged 59) | Israel | Nir Oz attack | Recovered | 11 June 2025 | 7 October 2023 |
| Nattapong Pinta | | Thailand | Nir Oz attack | Recovered | 7 June 2025 | December 2023 |
| Gad Haggai | 28 November 1950 (aged 72) | Israel; United States | Nir Oz attack | Recovered | 5 June 2025 | 7 October 2023 |
| Judy Weinstein-Haggai | 29 August 1953 (aged 70) | Israel; United States; Canada | Nir Oz attack | Recovered | 5 June 2025 | 7 October 2023 |
| Itzik Elgarat | 1 July 1955 (aged 68) | Israel; Denmark | Nir Oz attack | Returned within the framework of the January 2025 Gaza war ceasefire | 26 February 2025 | Before; July 2024 |
| Tsachi Idan | 21 April 1974 (aged 49) | Israel | Nahal Oz attack | Returned within the framework of the January 2025 Gaza war ceasefire | 26 February 2025 | 4 December 2023 |
| Shlomo Mansour | 17 March 1938 (aged 85) | Israel | Kissufim massacre | Returned within the framework of the January 2025 Gaza war ceasefire | 26 February 2025 | 7 October 2023 |
| Ohad Yahalomi | 9 April 1974 (aged 49) | Israel; France | Nir Oz attack | Returned within the framework of the January 2025 Gaza war ceasefire | 26 February 2025 | 19 January 2024 |
| Shiri Bibas | 20 April 1991 (aged 32) | Israel; Argentina; Germany | Nir Oz attack | Returned within the framework of the January 2025 Gaza war ceasefire | 22 February 2025 | November 2023 |
| Ariel Bibas | 5 August 2019 (aged 4) | Israel; Argentina; Germany | Nir Oz attack | Returned within the framework of the January 2025 Gaza war ceasefire | 20 February 2025 | November 2023 |
| Kfir Bibas | 18 January 2023 (9 months) | Israel; Argentina; Germany | Nir Oz attack | Returned within the framework of the January 2025 Gaza war ceasefire | 20 February 2025 | November 2023 |
| Oded Lifshitz | 11 May 1940 (aged 83) | Israel; Poland; Germany | Nir Oz attack | Returned within the framework of the January 2025 Gaza war ceasefire | 20 February 2025 | 26 October 2023 |
| Hamza Ziyadne | | Israel | Working on farm during Holit attack | Recovered | 10 January 2025 | Before; 8 January 2025 |
| Youssef Ziyadne | | Israel | Working on farm during Holit attack | Recovered | 7 January 2025 | Before; 8 January 2025 |
| Itay Svirsky | 17 February 1985 (aged 38) | Israel; Germany | Be'eri massacre | Recovered | 4 December 2024 | January 2024 |
| Ori Danino | 31 January 1999 (aged 24) | Israel | Nova music festival | Recovered | 31 August 2024 | 29 August 2024 or 30 August 2024 |
| Carmel Gat | 16 May 1984 (aged 39) | Israel; Germany | Her sister's home in Be'eri | Recovered | 31 August 2024 | 29 August 2024 or 30 August 2024 |
| Hersh Goldberg-Polin | 3 October 2000 (aged 23) | Israel; United States | Nova music festival | Recovered | 31 August 2024 | 29 August 2024 or 30 August 2024 |
| Alexander Lobanov | 18 February 1991 (aged 32) | Israel; Russia | Nova music festival | Recovered | 31 August 2024 | 29 August 2024 or 30 August 2024 |
| Almog Sarusi | 18 January 1997 (aged 26) | Israel | Nova music festival | Recovered | 31 August 2024 | 29 August 2024 or 30 August 2024 |
| Eden Yerushalmi | 14 October 1999 (aged 23) | Israel | Nova music festival | Recovered | 31 August 2024 | 29 August 2024 or 30 August 2024 |
| Shaked Dahan | 4 February 2004 (aged 19) | Israel | Near Kibbutz Nirim | Recovered | 28 August 2024 (Note: Indentity of the recovered body was not made public until October 2025) | 7 October 2023 |
| Yagev Buchshtab | 23 January 1989 (aged 34) | Israel | Nirim attack | Recovered | 20 August 2024 | 14 February 2024 |
| Alex Dancyg | 21 July 1948 (aged 75) | Israel; Poland | Nir Oz attack | Recovered | 20 August 2024 | 14 February 2024 |
| Nadav Popplewell | 1 April 1972 (aged 51) | Israel; United Kingdom | Nirim attack | Recovered | 20 August 2024 | 14 February 2024 |
| Yoram Metzger | 8 August 1943 (aged 80) | Israel | Nir Oz attack | Recovered | 20 August 2024 | 14 February 2024 |
| Avraham Munder | 8 December 1944 (aged 78) | Israel | Nir Oz attack | Recovered | 20 August 2024 | 14 February 2024 |
| Chaim Peri | 13 April 1944 (aged 79) | Israel; Poland | Nir Oz attack | Recovered | 20 August 2024 | 14 February 2024 |
| Tomer Ahimas | 24 June 2003 (aged 20) | Israel | Nirim attack | Recovered | 25 July 2024 | 7 October 2023 |
| Kiril Brodski | 4 August 2004 (aged 19) | Israel | Nirim attack | Recovered | 25 July 2024 | 7 October 2023 |
| Oren Goldin | 9 December 1989 (aged 33) | Israel | Nir Yitzhak attack | Recovered | 25 July 2024 | 7 October 2023 |
| Maya Goren | 5 May 1967 (aged 56) | Israel | Nir Oz attack | Recovered | 25 July 2024 | 7 October 2023 |
| Ravid Katz | 28 July 1972 (aged 51) | Israel | Nir Oz attack | Recovered | 25 July 2024 | 7 October 2023 |
| Orión Hernández Radoux | 11 November 1992 (aged 30) | Mexico; France | Nova music festival massacre | Recovered | 23 May 2024 | 7 October 2023 |
| Michel Nisenbaum | 13 July 1964 (aged 59) | Israel; Brazil | Mefalsim | Recovered | 23 May 2024 | 7 October 2023 |
| Hanan Yablonka | 11 October 1981 (aged 41) | Israel | Nova music festival | Recovered | 23 May 2024 | 7 October 2023 |
| Ron Binyamin | 7 July 1970 (aged 53) | Israel | Killed while riding bicycle | Recovered | 17 May 2024 | 7 October 2023 |
| Amit Buskila | 15 November 1995 (aged 27) | Israel | Nova music festival | Recovered | 17 May 2024 | 7 October 2023 |
| Itzhak Gelerenter | 10 May 1967 (aged 56) | Israel | Nova music festival | Recovered | 17 May 2024 | 7 October 2023 |
| Shani Louk | 7 February 2001 (aged 22) | Germany; Israel | Nova music festival | Recovered | 17 May 2024 | 7 October 2023 |
| Elad Katzir | 17 April 1976 (aged 47) | Israel; Poland | Nir Oz attack | Recovered | 5 April 2024 | January 2024 |
| Yotam Haim | 2 January 1995 (aged 28) | Israel; Poland | Kfar Aza massacre | Retrieved | 15 December 2023 | 15 December 2023 |
| Alon Shamriz | 24 July 1997 (aged 26) | Israel | Kfar Aza massacre | Retrieved | 15 December 2023 | 15 December 2023 |
| Samer Talalka | 22 October 1998 (aged 24) | Israel | Nir Am | Retrieved | 15 December 2023 | 15 December 2023 |
| Nik Beizer | 26 August 2004 (aged 19) | Israel | Near Erez Crossing | Recovered | 14 December 2023 | 10 November 2023 |
| Ron Sherman | 1 August 2004 (aged 19) | Israel; Argentina | Near Erez Crossing | Recovered | 14 December 2023 | 10 November 2023 |
| Elia Toledano | 22 November 1995 (aged 27) | Israel; France | Nova music festival | Recovered | 14 December 2023 | 10 November 2023 |
| Ziv Dado | 14 April 1987 (aged 36) | Israel | Mefalsim | Recovered | 11 December 2023 | 7 October 2023 |
| Eden Zecharya | 15 December 1995 (aged 27) | Israel | Nova music festival | Recovered | 11 December 2023 | 7 October 2023 |
| Ofir Tzarfati | 6 October 1996 (aged 27) | Israel; France | Nova music festival | Recovered | 1 December 2023 (Note: Eight months after the recovery of Tsarfati's body, Hamas released a photo of his body purporting the photo to be evidence of their claim that one of their operatives assigned to guard Israeli hostages had recently killed a hostage in an act of revenge. On 27 October 2025, Hamas returned to Israel remnants of his body not recovered in 2023.) | Before 27 November 2023 |
| Noa Marciano | 12 October 2004 (aged 18) | Israel | Nahal Oz attack | Recovered | 19 November 2023 | Before; 14 November 2023 (Note: According to Hamas, she died on 9 November 2023 from an Israeli airstrike.) |
| Yehudit Waiss | 13 April 1958 (aged 65) | Israel | Be'eri massacre | Recovered | 16 November 2023 | November 2023 |

== Hostages held in Israel ==
There were two hostage standoff situations inside Israel on the day of the October 7 attacks: one in Ofakim at the home of Rachel Edry, and one in Be'eri at the home of Pessi Cohen. At a third scene, the Sderot police station, police officers and civilians escaped to the building's roof, where they were rescued without incident. The Hamas militants remained holed up in the station until they were neutralized.

The hostage takers at Pessi Cohen's home in Be'eri demanded safe passage to Gaza for themselves and their hostages.

=== Survived ===
| Name | Age when kidnapped | Nationality | Venue of hostage standoff | Status | Date |
|---|---|---|---|---|---|
| Rachel Edry | | Israel | her home in Ofakim | Rescued | 7 October 2023 |
| David Edry | | Israel | his home in Ofakim | Rescued | 7 October 2023 |
| Yasmin Porat | | Israel | escaped from the Nova music festival, found shelter at the home of Hadas Dagan in Be'eri where she was kidnapped and held hostage at Pessi Cohen's home | Released by one of the hostage takers who surrendered (Note: Porat was used as a human shield during the surrender.) | 7 October 2023 |
| Hadas Dagan | | Israel | kidnapped from her home in Be'eri and held hostage at Pessi Cohen's home | Rescued | 7 October 2023 |

=== Deceased ===
| Name | Age when kidnapped | Nationality | Venue of hostage standoff | Date |
|---|---|---|---|---|
| Adi Dagan | 68 | Israel | kidnapped from his home in Be'eri and held hostage at Pessi Cohen's home | 7 October 2023 |
| Tal Katz | | Israel | escaped from the Nova music festival, found shelter at the home of Adi Dagan in Be'eri where he was kidnapped and held hostage at Pessi Cohen's home | 7 October 2023 |
| Pessi Cohen | 68 | Israel | her home in Be'eri | 7 October 2023 |
| Yitzhak (Zizi) Sitton | 76 | Israel | his sister-in-law's home in Be'eri | 7 October 2023 |
| Hanna (Hani) Sitton | 73 | Israel | her sister's home in Be'eri | 7 October 2023 |
| Tal Sitton | 49 | Israel | his aunt's home in Be'eri | 7 October 2023 |
| Suhaib Abu Amer Razeem | 22 | Palestine/Israel (Note: Razeem lived in East Jerusalem, unilaterally annexed by Israel in 1980 but considered as part of Palestine by the United Nations. He did not hold Israeli citizenship but maintained a permanent Israeli residency.) | kidnapped from the Nova music festival and held hostage at Pessi Cohen's home in Be'eri | 7 October 2023 |
| Liel Hetzroni | 12 | Israel | kidnapped from her home in Be'eri and held hostage at Pessi Cohen's home | 7 October 2023 |
| Yanai Hetzroni | 12 | Israel | kidnapped from his home in Be'eri and held hostage at Pessi Cohen's home | 7 October 2023 |
| Ayala Hetzroni | | Israel | kidnapped from her home in Be'eri and held hostage at Pessi Cohen's home | 7 October 2023 |
| Hava Ben-Ami | 78 | Israel | kidnapped from her home in Be'eri and held hostage at Pessi Cohen's home | 7 October 2023 |
| Ze'ev Hakar | 72 | Israel | kidnapped from his home in Be'eri and held hostage at Pessi Cohen's home | 7 October 2023 |
| Zahava Hakar | 70 | Israel | kidnapped from her home in Be'eri and held hostage at Pessi Cohen's home | 7 October 2023 |

== See also ==
- Sexual and gender-based violence in the October 7 attacks
