= Adam Berdichevsky =

Israeli wheelchair tennis player (born 1983)

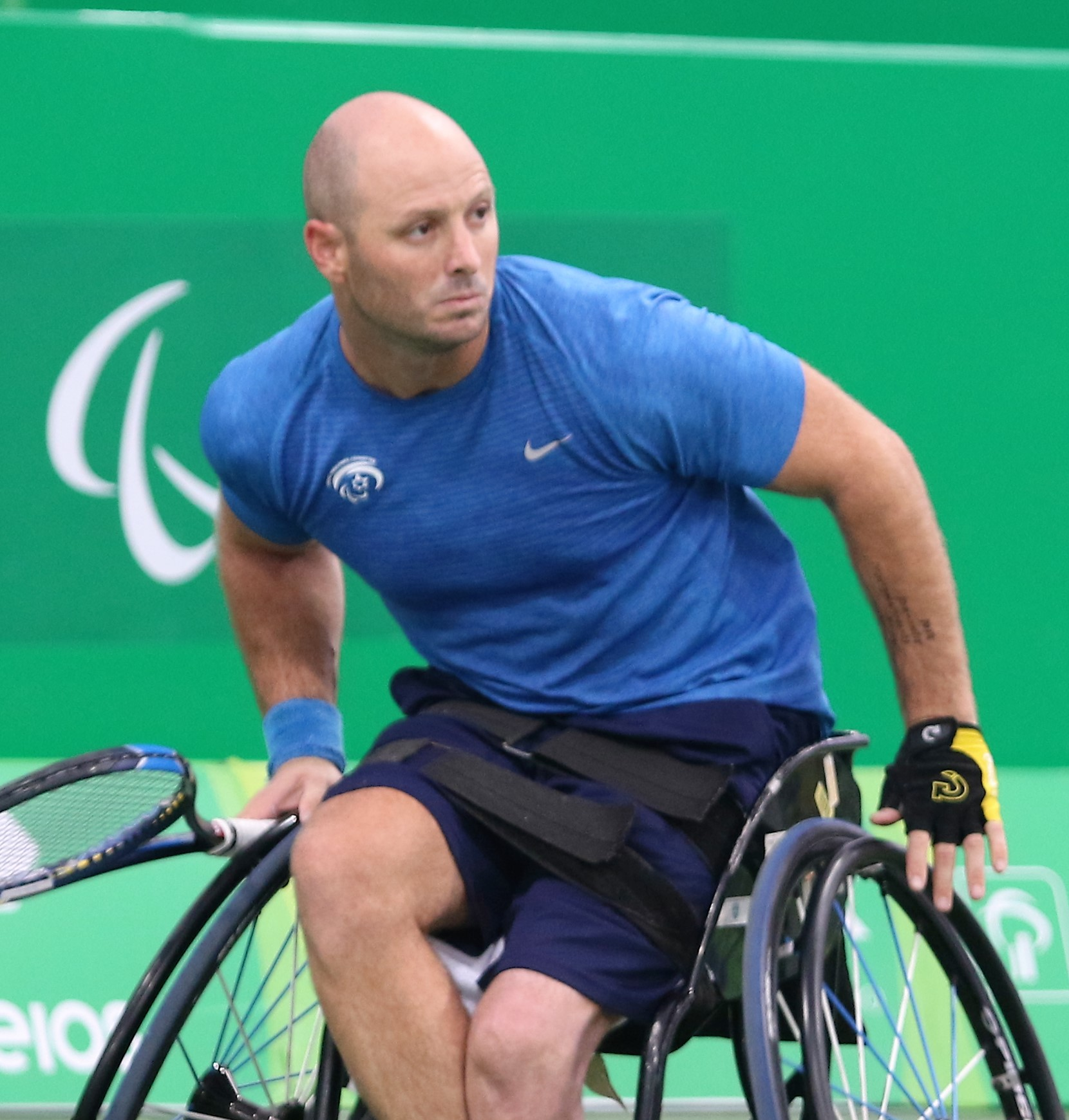
- Berdichevsky at the 2016 Rio Paralympics

Personal information
- Native name: אדם ברדיצבסקי
- Born: 19 October 1983 (age 42) Nir Yitzhak, Israel
- Home town: Nir Yitzhak, Israel
- Education: Ben Gurion University and Ariel University (engineering degree)
- Occupation: Mechanical engineer

Sport
- Country: Israel
- Sport: Wheelchair tennis
- Club: Spivak Ilan Ramat Gan
- Coached by: Ofer Sela

Achievements and titles
- National finals: Both singles and doubles championships in 2018, 2020, and 2021
- Highest world ranking: No. 20 in singles; No. 28 in doubles

Adam Berdichevsky (Hebrew: אדם ברדיצ'בסקי; born 19 October 1983) is an Israeli mechanical engineer and competitive wheelchair tennis player. He represented Israel at the 2016 Rio Paralympics and the 2020 Tokyo Paralympics. He represented Israel at the 2024 Paris Paralympics, in both singles and doubles.

Berdichevsky was born in kibbutz Nir Yitzhak in the Gaza envelope. He served in the Israeli military, where he met his wife. He later studied mechanical engineering at Ben Gurion University and Ariel University, where he earned a bachelor's degree, and now works as a mechanical engineer. He lost most of his left leg in a boating accident during a vacation in Thailand in 2007. Berdichevsky, his wife, and their three children survived the 2023 Hamas-led attack on Israel.

As of December 2023, Berdichevsky was ranked number 1 in men's wheelchair tennis in Israel. As of 26 August 2024, he was ranked number 41 globally in singles and number 63 in doubles by the International Tennis Federation (each lower than any ranking he had in the six years prior to the Hamas attack), while his career-highs were number 20 in singles and number 28 in doubles.

== Early life ==
Berdichevsky was born in, grew up in, and has raised his family in kibbutz Nir Yitzhak in the Gaza envelope. Speaking in 2019 of Hamas missile attacks on the kibbutz, he said: "I will not give Hamas the satisfaction of my fleeing from the kibbutz. This is my home." He served in the Israeli military's Nahal Brigade, which was where he met his wife, Hila. He later studied mechanical engineering at Ben Gurion University and Ariel University, where he earned a bachelor's degree, and now works as a mechanical engineer. He speaks both Hebrew and English.

== Personal life ==
=== Accident ===
After completing his service in the military, Berdichevsky and his girlfriend (now wife) Hila went on a year of travel. After visiting Australia and New Zealand, in September 2007 they stopped in Thailand.

Four days before their planned return to Israel, while on a ferry trip off the islands of southern Thailand, the ferry was caught in a strong storm near Ko Phi Phi. When the ferry began to capsize, sink, and overturn, the two jumped into the water. Berdichevsky was caught in the engine's motor and propeller, which severed most of his left leg and nearly severed his right leg; a fellow Israeli was killed in the accident.

Berdichevsky underwent rehabilitation at Soroka Medical Center. He now uses prostheses to walk.

=== 2023 Hamas-led attack on Israel ===
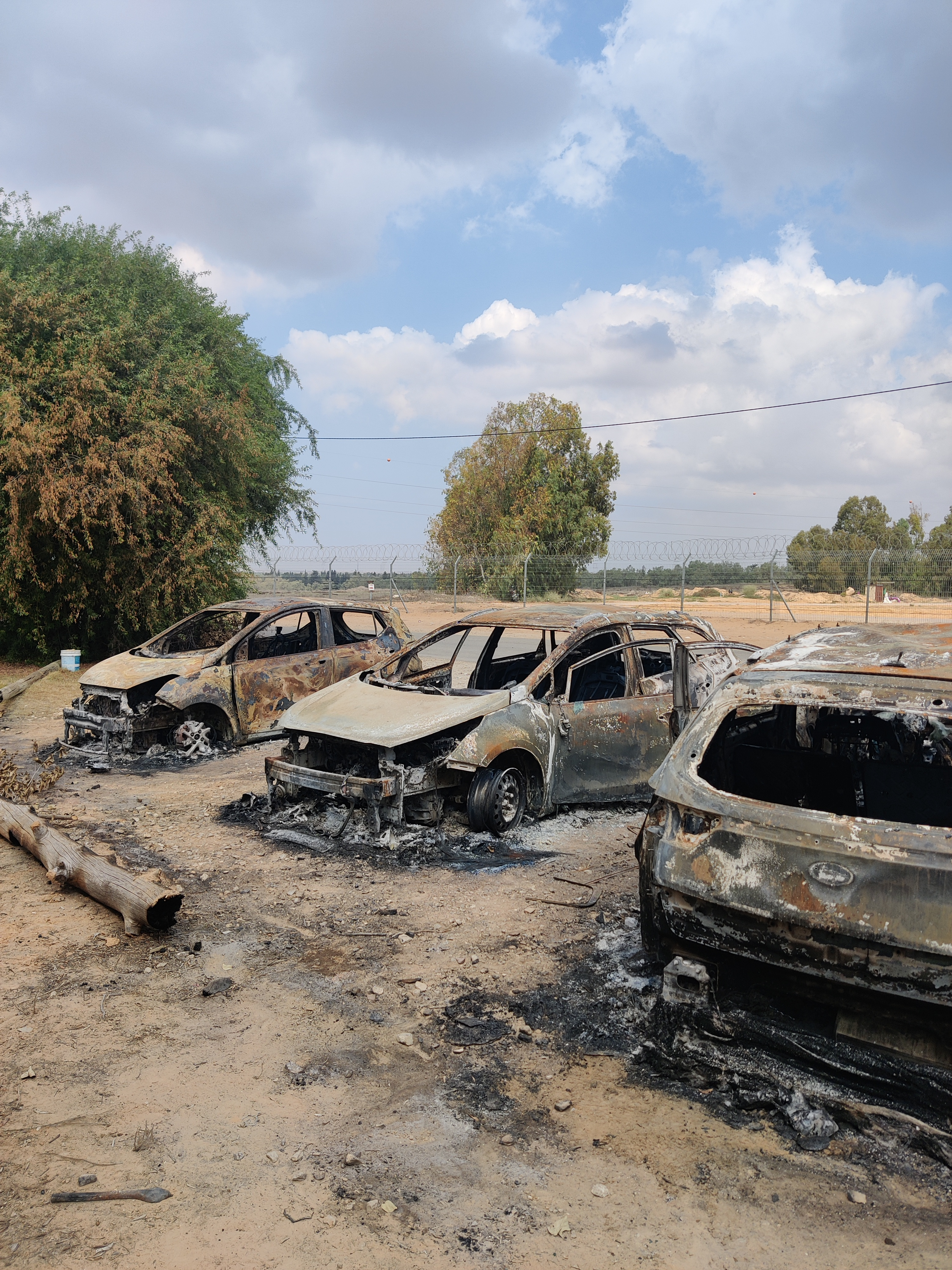
Nir Yitzhak vehicles after the Hamas-led attack

Berdichevsky, his wife Hila, and their three young children were living in the kibbutz of Nir Yitzhak, two miles from Gaza, when it was attacked by Hamas forces on 7 October 2023. They hid in a safe room in their home. According to Berdichevsky, he armed himself with two knives from his kitchen, and told his children to hide under beds if militants broke in. The family heard heavy Kalashnikov rifle fire and the sounds of militants attacking and killing their neighbors. Four of the family's close friends were killed before the Israel Defense Forces arrived.

Ten months later Berdichevsky said, of 7 October: "Of course, all the time it runs through my head. You can't stop thinking about it." Berdichevsky said that since the attack: "for me nothing is really important. If I lose, I lose. If I win, I win. Before that, if I was losing a match, it took me one or two days to be okay."

Following the attack, the family was evacuated to Eilat, Israel. The day of the attack, his best friend and fellow Israeli wheelchair tennis player Guy Sasson invited Berdichevsky and his family to Houston, Texas, where Sasson was living temporarily as his wife pursued her medical studies. In December, his family moved temporarily to Texas to live near Sasson.

== Wheelchair tennis career ==
Before playing wheelchair tennis, Berdichevsky was a para-swimmer for about four years.

Berdichevsky started practicing wheelchair tennis in 2013, and has won six Israeli national titles (in both singles and doubles in 2018, 2020, and 2021), and represented Israel at six World Championships. As of August 2024, he had won 21 international singles titles and 13 international doubles titles. He is a member of club Spivak Ilan Ramat Gan, and is coached by Ofer Sela.

At the 2016 Rio Paralympics, he competed in the men's singles competition, and came in 14th. At the 2020 Tokyo Paralympics, Berdichevsky competed in both men's singles (coming in 10th) and men's doubles (losing in the round prior to the quarterfinals).

=== 2024–present; Paris Paralympics ===
Berdichevsky served as one of Israel's flagbearers, alongside Lihi Ben-David, in the opening ceremony 2024 Paris Paralympics Parade of Nations. He represented Israel at the 2024 Paris Paralympics in singles, and in doubles with Israeli Sergei Lysov, at 40 years of age.

Berdichevsky competed in his first singles match at the Paris Paralympics on 30 August 2024. A group of 30 survivors from his kibbutz, including twins whose father was still a hostage in Gaza, were there to cheer him on, holding up Israeli flags and messages in Hebrew, along with his wife and their children ages 6, 9, and 10. Approximately 6,000 spectators watched as he played on the Suzanne Lenglen court at Roland Garros. He beat Italian player Luca Arca in straight sets in men's singles in the first round, and said "I'm very happy that I could give some good times in these bad days." He was defeated by Chilean Alexander Cataldo in the second round.

== See also ==
- Israel at the Paralympics
