= Jan Karski Eagle Award =

Polish award

The Jan Karski Eagle Award (pol. Nagroda Orła Jana Karskiego) was established on 5 May 2000 by Polish professor Jan Karski (1914–2000), war courier of the Polish government in-exile, witness of the Holocaust and Righteous Among the Nations. Karski wanted this award to go to those who "can worthily worry about Poland" and to those who "although aren't Polish, wish good to Poland". The award has an honorary character and there is no monetary award granted with it, because, as the originator argued, "dignity is incalculable in money". It is symbolized by the Eagle statuette, the project of which was approved by Jan Karski. The organisation side of the award was gifted to Waldemar Piasecki.

== Committee ==
The award committee of the Eagle Award is made of people that received this award. Its first chairman was Jacek Kuroń, who was the only one who was honored to get this award directly from Jan Karski's hands. In handing over the award to Józef Tischner, Jan Karski participated via phone. The committee gives out the award yearly on June 24, on Jan Karski's birthday.

== Winners ==
- 2000: Jacek Kuroń, Józef Tischner
- 2001: Rabin Jacob Baker from Jedwabne and Krzysztof Godlewski, mayor of Jedwabne
- 2002: Grzegorz Pawłowski, Marek Edelman
- 2003: Tadeusz Mazowiecki, Alfons Nossol
- 2004: Viktor Yushchenko, Feliks Tych
- 2005: Tygodnik Powszechny, Oriana Fallaci
- 2006: Adam Michnik, Abraham Foxman
- 2007: Elie Wiesel, Tadeusz Pieronek
- 2008: Shimon Peres, Bronisław Geremek
- 2009: Stanisław Dziwisz, Hoover Institution
- 2010: Aleksander Kwaśniewski, Leopold Unger
- 2011: Lech Wałęsa, Mikhail Gorbachev
- 2012: Karol Modzelewski, United States Holocaust Memorial Museum
- 2013: Richard Pipes, the movie Aftermath (2012)
- 2014: The Kozielewski family, Rotary International
- 2015: Julian Kornhauser, Boris Nemtsov
- 2016: Nadiya Savchenko, Arthur Schneier
- 2017: Abraham Skorka, Ibrahim Al-Sabbagh
- 2018: Władysław Anders, Ghetto Fighters' House
- 2019: Paweł Adamowicz (granted 14 January 2019, a couple of hours after death announcement), Franciszek Dąbrowski (posthumously)
- 2020: Father Ludwik Wiśniewski, Dominika Kulczyk
- 2021: Lampedusa, Remigiusz Korejwo, Jan Holoubek
- 2022: Volodymyr "Vovka" Bigun, the Polish society (for its solidarity with Ukrainian people)
- 2023: Horst Köhler and the International Court of Justice in the Hague
- 2024: Adam Strzembosz and Vera Jourova.
- 2025: Yad Vashem, Ronald S. Lauder
- 2026: Wojciech Polak, European Parliament.

== Special editions ==
Aside from yearly awards, occasionally there are Special Awards given out honoring the achievements and merits of the winners in the longer time schedule, sometimes even over their entire lives. To this day there are only 6 winners:

- Walentyna Janta-Połczyńska (2016)
- Herbert Hoover (posthumously, 2019)
- Viasna Human Rights Centre (2020)
- Alexei Navalny (2021)
- Volodymyr Zelenskiy (2022)
- Alex Dancyg (2024)
- Adam Boniecki MIC (2024)
- Grzegorz Ryś (2025).
