= Kidnapping of Avigail Idan =

2023 abduction in southern Israel

Avigail Idan
- Born: November 24, 2019 (age 6); Israel
- Known for: Hostage in Gaza (2023), abducted at age 3

Avigail Mor Idan is an American-Israeli child who was abducted at the age of three during the 2023 October 7 attacks as part of the Kfar Aza Massacre by Hamas. She was released on November 26, 2023, after spending 50 days in captivity.

== Early life ==
Avigail Idan was born on November 24, 2019. Her parents were Roee Idan and Smadar Idan. She lived in Kibbutz Kfar Aza.

== Abduction ==
On October 7, 2023, Idan's parents were killed during the Kfar Aza Massacre. After Idan's mother, Smadar, was killed, the rest of the family fled outside the house. Idan was being held by her father, Roee, when he was shot dead. Her two siblings, Michael and Amelia, reentered the house and hid in a cabinet for 14 hours until they were rescued. Her siblings believed that Idan had been killed. However, Idan, covered in her parents' blood, had fled to the house of the neighbors, the Brodutch family. She hid with the family for four hours. However, around 11 AM, Idan, alongside the Brodutch family; Hagar, Yuval, Ofri, and Oria, were all kidnapped by around 15 Hamas militants and taken to Gaza. Around a week after the attacks, Idan was determined to have been abducted into Gaza.

== Captivity and release ==
Idan was held with the Brodutch family throughout her captivity. They were kept in multiple apartments. On their twelfth day of captivity, the house the five hostages were held in was struck by an IDF airstrike. The hostages were moved to a different location shortly afterwards, where the hostages began to receive less food. During her captivity, Idan developed lice, causing her hair to need to be cut. During negotiations for hostage releases, U.S. officials pushed for Idan to be among the first hostages released. Idan turned four while in captivity.

Idan, along with the Brodutch family, were released on November 26, 2023, as part of the 2023 Gaza war ceasefire. Upon her release, U.S. President Joe Biden remarked "I wish I was there to hold her."

== Post-release life ==
After her release, Idan was taken to Schneider's Children Medical Center. Idan and her two siblings were adopted by her maternal uncle, Leron Mor, and his wife Zoli.

In April 2024, Idan, along with her surviving relatives, met U.S. president Joe Biden at the White House. In September 2024, Idan's great aunt, Liz Hersh Naftali, released a book, Saving Abigail: The True Story of the Abduction and Rescue of a Three-Year-Old Hostage.
