= Walentyna Janta-Połczyńska =

Polish political activist and exile (1913–2020)

Walentyna Janta-Połczyńska (née Stocker; 1 February 1913, Lemberg — 2 April 2020, New York City) was the last surviving member of the Polish government-in-exile during the Second World War, and a founder of the Polish wartime resistance radio station Świt (Dawn). A recipient of the Officer's Cross of the Order of Merit of the Republic of Poland, she was a philanthropist and the centre of Polish-American culture in New York.

== Early life ==
Walentyna Stocker was born in Lemberg (now Lviv) in Austria-Hungary to Ludwik Stocker and Karolina Kochanowska. Her father, who was of English origin, worked in the mining industry and came from a family that prospected for oil in eastern Poland. She had a brother, Andrzej, and a sister, Krystyna.

She graduated from secondary school in Krosno. In 1938, Stocker travelled to London to study English and secretarial practice. She was briefly married to a Polish navy officer, Wilhelm Pacewicz.

== War years ==
On 1 September 1939, Stocker began working at the Polish embassy in London, soon after the German invasion of Poland in 1939. In June 1940, when the Polish government-in-exile was set up, she became the personal secretary to General Wladyslaw Sikorski—the prime minister in exile. During meetings of the Polish cabinet with foreign leaders (including Winston Churchill), she acted as interpreter. At the end of 1942, Stocker began working as an organizer and announcer for the secret Świt radio station, which had its headquarters at Bletchley, and broadcast to occupied Poland.

In her role as translator, Stocker prepared intelligence briefs and typescripts from Jan Karski's reports. Jan Karski, an underground investigator, delivered some of the earliest reports of German atrocities against the Jews in the Warsaw Ghetto. In a biography of Karski entitled Inferno, Waldemar Piasecki wrote that "with [Stocker's] language and professional qualifications, she was an invaluable acquisition." In April 1942, she was appointed to be the secretary of Władysław Anders for the duration of his stay in London.

In July 1943, when General Sikorski died in a plane crash after a takeoff from Gibraltar, Stocker assisted in arranging his funeral arrangements.

She helped arrange the trips of specialized Polish soldiers who—after training in Scotland—were parachuted into occupied Poland to join the ranks of the Polish Home Army.

In 1943, Stocker's brother was captured by the NKVD and sent to Siberia. Thereafter, he joined the Polish 2nd Corps under Wladyslaw Anders, which was deported to Iran. Her sister and nephew died during the Warsaw Uprising in 1944. Her mother and brother survived the war. Her father died before the war began.

In 1945, Stocker joined the Polish Army's Women's Auxiliary Service and went to Frankfurt, where she was given the rank of second lieutenant in the Polish army. In Frankfurt, she worked as an interpreter aiding Polish prisoners of war and survivors of concentration camps. She largely debriefed Polish former prisoners of war as well as concentration camp inmates who had been victims of medical experiments during World War II. She took care of female prisoners who were subjected to inhuman medical experiments run by Nazis. She served in the American-run part of Frankfurt from 1945 to 1946, where she met people to help get her mother from Poland to Germany, which was illegal.

== Later life ==
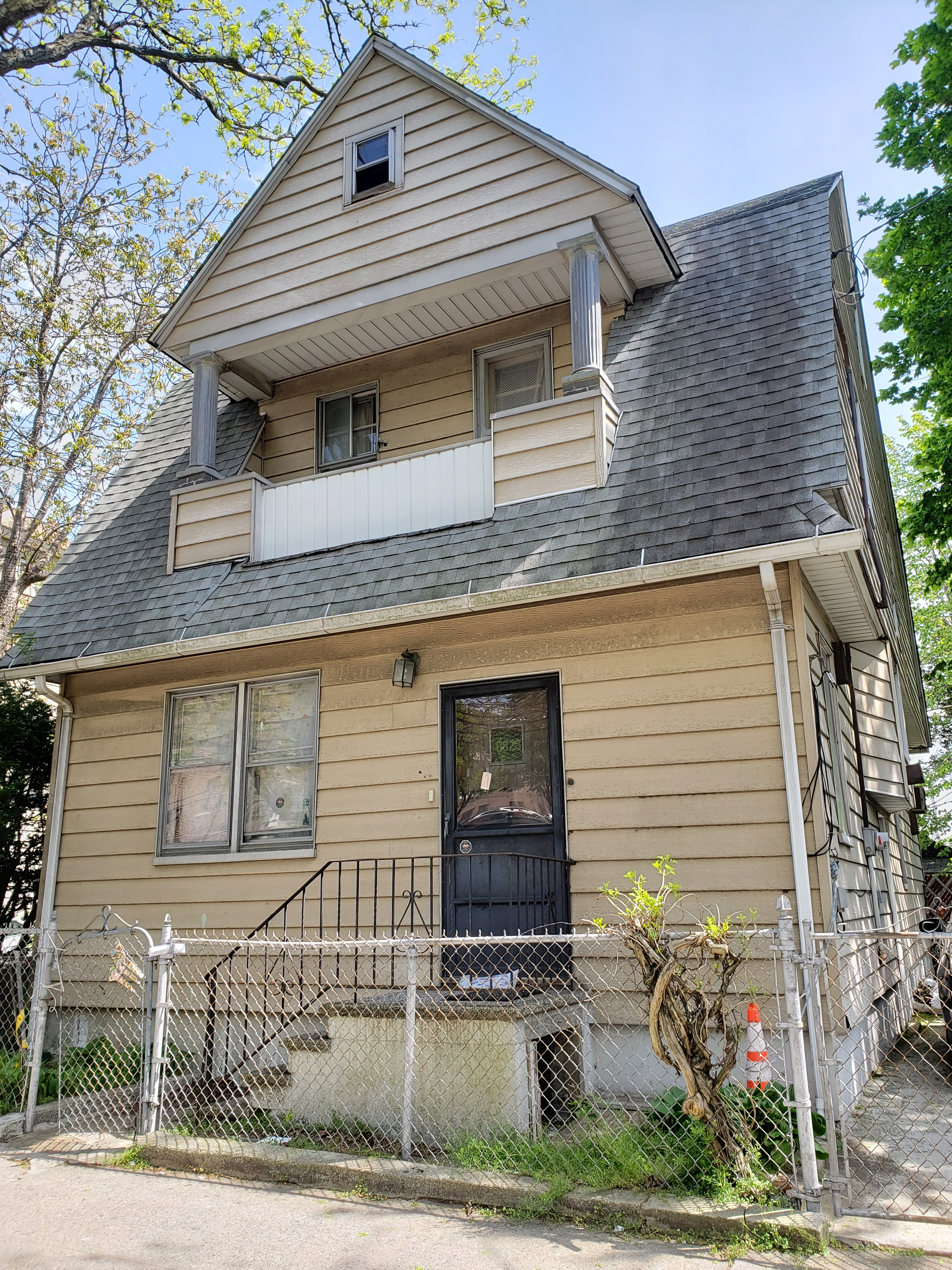
Janta-Połczyńska's house in Elmhurst, Queens. Efforts are made to have it designated as a landmark.

In 1946, Stocker and her mother emigrated to the United States, first settling in Buffalo, New York. She first found employment with an office for the Polish diaspora in Manhattan, after which she worked for the cosmetics company of Helena Rubinstein.

She married Aleksander Janta-Połczyński, a poet and journalist, in 1949. They met in London after he escaped German captivity. They settled in Elmhurst, New York. Together with her husband, she established a bookstore in Manhattan, selling old books and maps of Poland. This, along with their home, became a centre for émigré Polish culture in the United States. They hosted, among others, Czesław Miłosz, Jerzy Giedroyc, Jan Karski, Marek Hłasko, and Zbigniew Herbert, as well as Charlie Chaplin, Vladimir Nabokov, Mahatma Gandhi, and Karol Szymanowski.

From 1955 to 1958, Janta-Połczyńska worked for the Iraqi mission at the United Nations in New York City. She was also active at the Józef Piłsudski Institute of America, a research organisation devoted to the study of modern Polish history. Janta-Połczyńska was active with the Kosciuszko Foundation — the American Center of Polish Culture in Manhattan.

In 1958, Walentyna and Aleksander Janta-Połczyński assisted with a project that brought 35 former Polish prisoners of the Nazi concentration camp in Ravensbruck to the United States for mental health treatment for a period of six months. They helped solve problems that emerged as these former Polish concentration camp inmates sought mental health treatment in the United States, where they had not been before.

Between 1959 and 1961, Janta-Połczyńska worked successfully for the restoration of the Wawel Castle treasures (which had been evacuated at the start of the war) from Canada to Poland.

After her husband's death in 1974, Janta-Połczyńska started to look for a place where their archive could be compiled. In 1993, she began talking to representatives of the National Library of Poland. Shortly thereafter, she donated much of their collections of maps, manuscripts, prints and historical documents to the Manuscript Department at the National Library of Poland in Warsaw. Initially, this archive was only reserved for Dr. Franciszek Palowski, who was a researcher and expert in Aleksander Janta's work as well as a family friend. In 1998, the National Library began organizing and repacking the archive. During that time period, Walentyna Janta-Połczyński continued to supplement her initial gift with new materials.

In 2009, the National Library of Poland published a book of correspondence between Janta-Połczyńska and Jerzy Giedroyc.

Walentyna Janta-Połczyńska died at the Forest Hills hospital on 2 April 2020 at 107 years of age.

== Awards ==
- Medal of Merit for Polish Culture by the Ministry of Culture and National Heritage (2011)
- Officer's Cross of the Order of Merit of the Republic of Poland (2014)
- Jan Karski Eagle Award (2016)
