= Nirim attack =

2023 massacre by Palestinian militants in Israel

- Part of the October 7 attacks
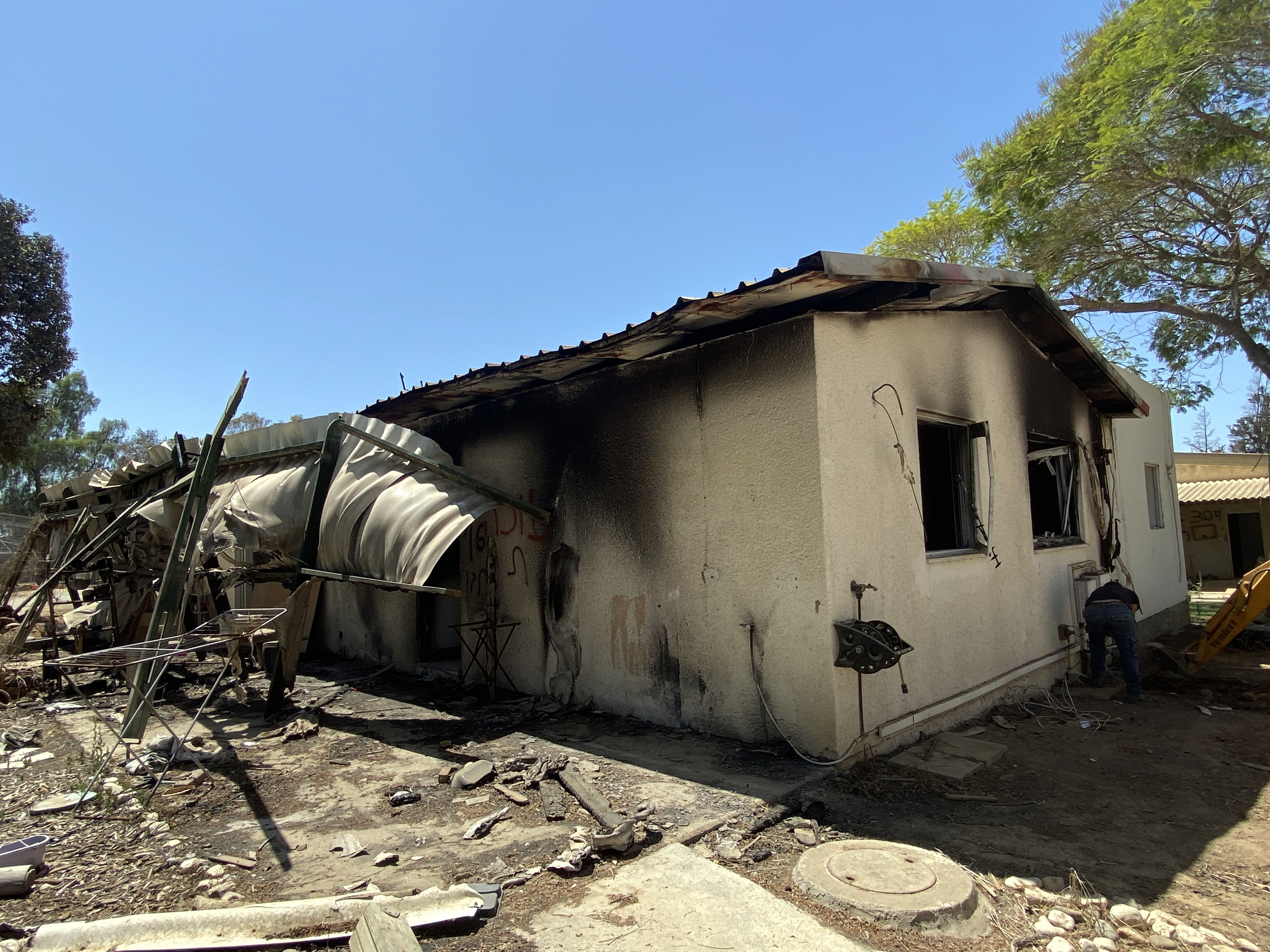
- Native name: הטבח בנירים
- Location: 31°20′10″N 34°23′42″E; Nirim, Southern District, Israel
- Date: 7 October 2023; 3 years ago
- Attack type: Mass shooting
- Deaths: 5+
- Injuries: many
- Perpetrator: Hamas's Southern Khan Yunis Battalion

On 7 October 2023, a surprise assault was launched on Israel by Hamas militants coming from the Gaza Strip. One of their targets was Nirim, a kibbutz located in the southern part of Israel, about 2 kilometres (1.2 mi) from the border with Gaza. Five kibbutz civilians were killed, many were injured and five civilians were kidnapped and taken hostage to Gaza.

== Background ==
Kibbutz Nirim is in the northwestern Negev desert near the Gaza Strip. It was established in 1946 by "Nir", a small core team of young Hashomer Hatzair pioneers. Nirim's economy is based on agriculture: Extensive fielded crops, an avocado plantation, greenhouses and milking cows. Approximately 500 people, including around 130 children, live in the kibbutz.

== The attack ==
The October 7 attacks began at around 6:29 AM with a rocket barrage, followed by infiltrations in numerous locations. A total of 150 Palestinian would attack the Nirim area, including 80 who entered the kibbutz. They included The first breach in the section of the border close to Nirim was at 6:33 AM. Hamas fighters blew a hole in the border barrier with explosives while a bulldozer was used to breach a gate next to it, enabling militants who had been waiting further back to stream into Israel. Two tanks and an armored personnel carrier based at the nearby IDF White House post positioned themselves at the border in the area adjacent to Nirim and Nir Oz. They battled militants breaching the border, killing several militants approaching Nirim, but one of the tanks was knocked out. Three of its crew were killed and one was captured, and the bodies and living crewman were taken to Gaza.

Colonel Asaf Hamami, the commander of the Southern Brigade of the Gaza Division of the Israel Defense Forces, saw the infiltration from his command center and set out for Nirim with two soldiers, Staff Sergeant Tomer Ahimas and Sergeant Kiril Brodski, in an MDT David light armored vehicle. While en route, Hamami instructed his troops to head to the border to defend against the invasion and for local security teams to be notified. In addition, troops in the Nirim area led by Captain Omer Wolf of the Golani Brigade's 51st Battalion and an army patrol positioned themselves in the vicinity of Nirim.

At 6:40 AM, 11 militants on six motorcycles reached the perimeter fence of the kibbutz and managed to enter it minutes later. At 6:47 AM, Hamami and his two soldiers managed to reach a vantage point just outside Nirim and encountered the militants, who fired at them. They returned fire and flanked around the kibbutz to enter through the main gate. From there, they drove to the location where they had spotted the militants. An exchange of fire that was to last for 20 minutes ensued. After Hamami was wounded in the thigh, Ahmias and Brodski evacuated him and took cover near a bomb shelter. They continued exchanging fire with the militants while trying to treat Hamami's wounds, and attempting to radio in that Hamami was wounded, although the message did not get through due to chaos in the IDF's communication channels. IDF commanders were unaware of Hamami's whereabouts for hours. All three soldiers were killed along with three militants. The fighting ended at about 7:10 AM. At this point, the surviving eight militants in the kibbutz split up, with four heading to Channah Peri's house where they abducted Peri and her son Nadav Popplewell, and four staying behind to take the bodies of Hamami, Ahmias, and Brodski. The militants were aware that they had killed a senior officer, having noticed the rank insignia on Hamami's uniform, but were unaware that he was a brigade commander.

The troops who had positioned themselves outside Nirim killed several militants attempting to enter the community but were unaware that there were eight more inside the kibbutz, and left along with the APC that had been near the border fence in the vicinity of Nirim and Nir Oz to reinforce the White House post as it came under attack. Wolf and two other soldiers would be killed fighting there. The force later returned to Nirim to prevent another group of militants from entering the kibbutz.

From 7:10 AM to 8:20 AM, there was no combat in Nirim as the four militants who remained by the bodies were still preoccupied with taking them and their MDT David vehicle. They were delayed by the need to coordinate with Hamas commanders in Gaza to ensure that the vehicle would not be fired on as it crossed into Gaza. The four others remained at Channah Peri's house. At 7:30 AM, the militants in Peri's house killed Gideon Babani. At 7:39 AM, another tank arrived in the vicinity of Nirim from the Kissufim area after encountering Hamas squads near Ein HaShlosha. The tank killed several more militants outside Nirim before returning to Kissufim. At 8:00 AM, the tank still positioned at the border fence reported that there were no further militants along the border fence in the area, and then left for the White House post. While en route, the tank spotted militants on pickup trucks and motorcycles near the perimeter fence of Nirim and exchanged fire with them for about an hour and a half, killing about 20 militants in the area between Nirim and the White House post. The tank then proceeded to kibbutz Nir Oz after receiving reports of militants there. The troops in the Nirim area were ordered to head to another base coming under attack at 8:20 AM under the assumption that there were no more militants inside Nirim. Meanwhile, dozens of militants entered Nirim, joining the eight already inside the kibbutz. The soldiers were unable to see this from where they were positioned.

Over the following 40 minutes, Hamas militants carried out numerous abductions and murders. At around 9:00 AM, the Hamas militants began to leave Nirim and return to Gaza, taking five hostages and the bodies of the three soldiers with them, but Palestinian Islamic Jihad militants and unaffiliated Palestinians were entering the kibbutz. During the attack, militants set houses ablaze, opened fire on homes, and hurled grenades. Members of the kibbutz's security team resisted the militants, initially fighting individually from their homes under the false assumption that the entire kibbutz had been conquered. At 10:00 AM, several members of the security team met up to fight as a group. They were joined by Amit Levy, a police officer on leave who was armed with an M16 rifle. They battled dozens of militants for some 40 minutes until they withdrew. According to the military security coordinator, following the skirmish, Levy and members of the standby squad secured a strategic vantage point on a rooftop of a silo. Recognizing their tactical disadvantage, the militants ultimately decided to withdraw.

At 11:20 AM, an Israeli Air Force helicopter, directed by the kibbutz military security coordinator, began firing at militants outside the kibbutz. It was agreed that the security team would focus on battling militants inside the kibbutz while the helicopter would carry out airstrikes on targets in proximity to the fence and beyond. This engagement persisted for approximately two hours.

At 1:24 PM, 40 soldiers from the IDF's commando school arrived in Nirim at their own initiative, joining the security team and carrying out searches of the kibbutz, killing seven militants who remained there. Another group of soldiers from the Bislamach Brigade arrived at 1:37 PM and killed two more militants who were holed up in a home. The last militant in the kibbutz was killed at 2:00 AM. The soldiers carried out scans of the kibbutz and evacuated the residents over the following hours. On the following day, troops scanning the fields outside the kibbutz killed eight more militants.

== Aftermath ==
Five civilians were killed in the attack on Nirim and five others were taken to Gaza as hostages. Of the hostages, three were released in a November 2023 hostage deal while two others were killed in captivity. A total of 10 IDF soldiers were killed while fighting in the vicinity of Nirim, including at a nearby army base. Some 50 Palestinian militants were killed between the Gaza border and Nirim while another 15 were killed inside the kibbutz.

Nirim members who survived the attack were evacuated from the kibbutz.

Among the survivors of the massacre was Shai Levy, Mako's military correspondent who stayed in a shelter and covered the sequence of events.

On 15 October, IDF soldiers reportedly killed Bilal al-Qedra, the commander of the Hamas' Nukhba unit in southern Khan Younis battalion who led the operation in Nirim. Hamas confirmed it in February 2026.

On 19 November, a Yehud resident who had been abducted from Nirim while visiting the kibbutz was released in a hostage deal. On 28 November, two Nirim members who were held hostage in Gaza for 53 days, were returned to Israel in the deal.

== See also ==
- Gaza war
- Outline of the Gaza war
- List of military engagements during the Gaza war
- Palestinian political violence
- Moshe Dayan's eulogy for Ro'i Rothberg
- List of massacres in Israel
