= Kidnapping of Yarden Roman-Gat =

2023 kidnapping during October 7 attacks

- Part of the Gaza war hostage crisis
- Yarden Roman-Gat reunited with her daughter, Gefen and husband, Alon
- Date: October 7, 2023
- Duration: 2 months
- Location: Kibbutz Be'eri, near Gaza Strip border, Israel
- Type: Kidnapping
- Participants: Yarden Roman-Gat; Alon Gat; Gefen Gat
- Outcome: Release of Yarden Roman-Gat; International campaign for hostages in Gaza
- Deaths: Kinneret Gat (Alon's mother)

The kidnapping of Yarden Roman-Gat occurred during the October 7 attacks and the subsequent Gaza war hostage crisis. Yarden Roman-Gat, a 36-year-old woman who is a dual national of Germany and Israel, along with her husband Alon and their 3-year-old daughter Gefen, were abducted by Hamas militants from their home in Kibbutz Be'eri on October 7, 2023, during the Be'eri massacre, and taken towards the Gaza Strip border. Yarden's act of self-sacrifice in saving her daughter during their escape attempt, and her subsequent two-month-long captivity in Gaza, garnered significant attention and an international campaign to release her and other hostages held in Gaza.

== Background ==
The family had returned to Israel from a vacation just a day before the massacre and had recently moved out of Be’eri to Givatayim due to the stress of missile attacks. She is known to be an avid rock climber. During her captivity, the rock-climbing community in Israel rallied together in support.

== Kidnapping ==
On October 7, 2023, the Roman-Gat family visited the kibbutz for a family event during the Jewish holiday of Simchat Torah. On that morning, Hamas militants who infiltrated the border from Gaza took the family from their house. During the attack, Alon's mother, Kinneret, was killed, and his sister Carmel was also taken. The four militants used a pickup truck stolen from the kibbutz to transport the captives.

Near the Gaza border, Yarden and Alon escaped from the vehicle with Gefen when their captors were distracted by the approach of an IDF tank and left the vehicle. Alon, Yarden, and Gefen, fled from the vehicle and ran towards the fields. Militants then spotted them and began chasing and shooting at them. To ensure her daughter's safety, Yarden handed Gefen to Alon, knowing he could run faster, and then ran in a different direction to distract the militants. Alon and Gefen managed to evade capture and hid in the bushes for 12 hours.

== Search efforts and captivity ==
After Alon provided them with the location where they had separated, Yarden's brother, Gili Roman, alongside volunteers and Bedouin trackers, searched the area where Yarden was last seen but found no trace of her. This led to the conclusion that she had been recaptured and taken to Gaza.

For nearly two months, Yarden remained a hostage in Gaza, sparking widespread concern and an international campaign to secure her release, along with other Hamas hostages. During her captivity, Yarden was unaware of the status of her three-year-old daughter, Gefen, and her husband.

== Release ==
Yarden was released on November 29, 2023, as part of a temporary ceasefire and prisoner exchange between Hamas and Israel brokered by Qatar and the United States. Yarden's emotional embrace when reunited with her daughter Gefen, was captured in a widely circulated video.

== See also ==
- Women in the Gaza war
- Kidnapping of the Bibas family
- Kidnapping of Noa Argamani
