= Nir Yitzhak =

Kibbutz in southern Israel

Nir Yitzhak: נִיר יִצְחָק (Hebrew); نير اسحاق (Arabic)
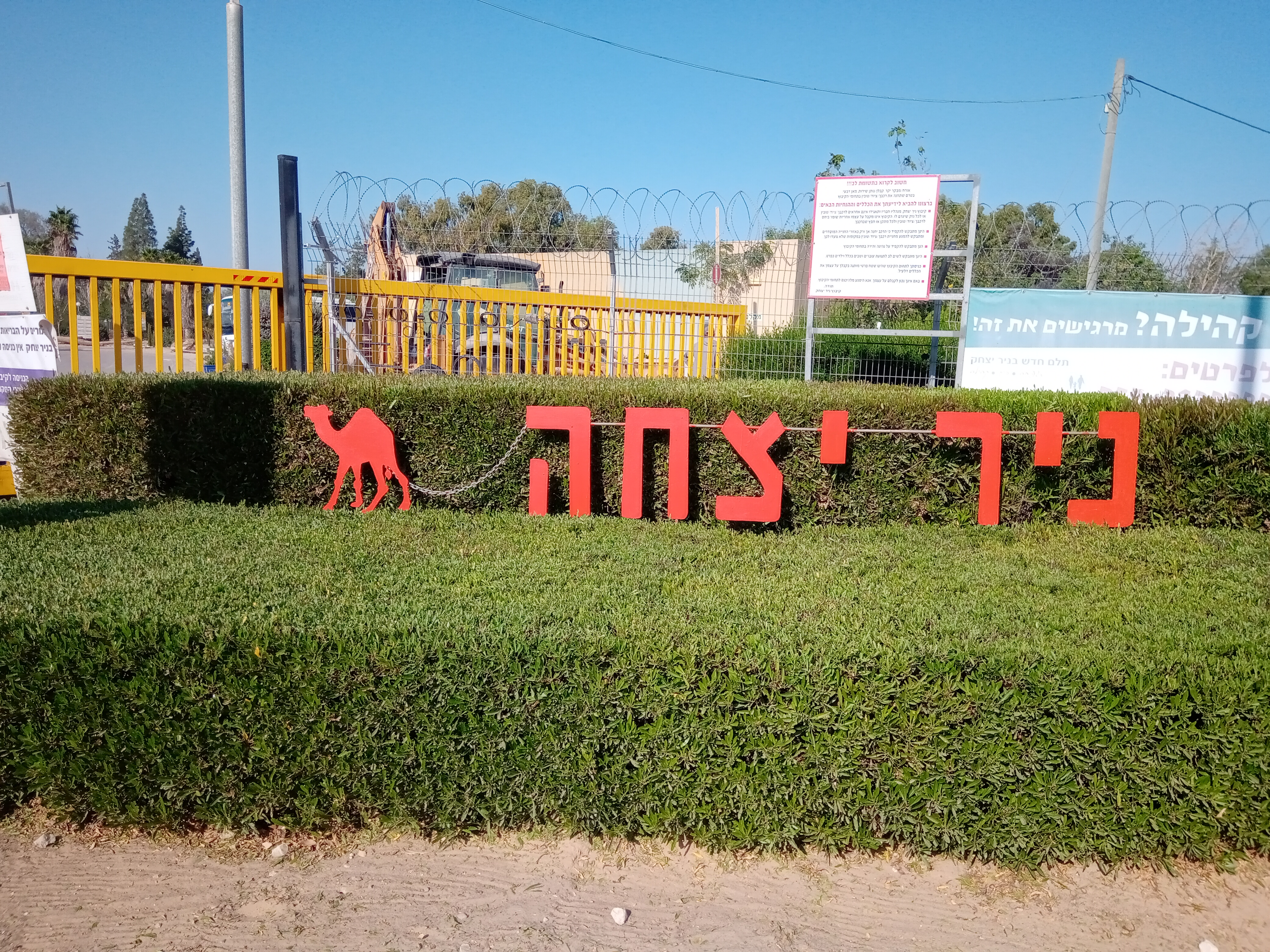

- Location within Northwest Negev region of Israel Location within Israel
- Coordinates: 31°14′14″N 34°21′26″E
- Country: Israel
- District: Southern
- Subdistrict: Beersheba
- Council: Eshkol
- Affiliation: Kibbutz Movement
- Founded: 8 December 1949
- Founder: Hashomer Hatzair Members
- Population (2024): 551
- Website: www.nir-yitzhak.org.il

Nir Yitzhak (Hebrew: נִיר יִצְחָק, Yitzhak's Meadow) is a kibbutz in the northwestern Negev desert of Israel. Located between Hevel Shalom and Hevel Eshkol, it falls under the jurisdiction of the Eshkol Regional Council. In 2024, it had a population of 551.

In October 7 attacks, Hamas carried out the Nir Yitzhak attack killing residents and kidnapping others.

== History ==
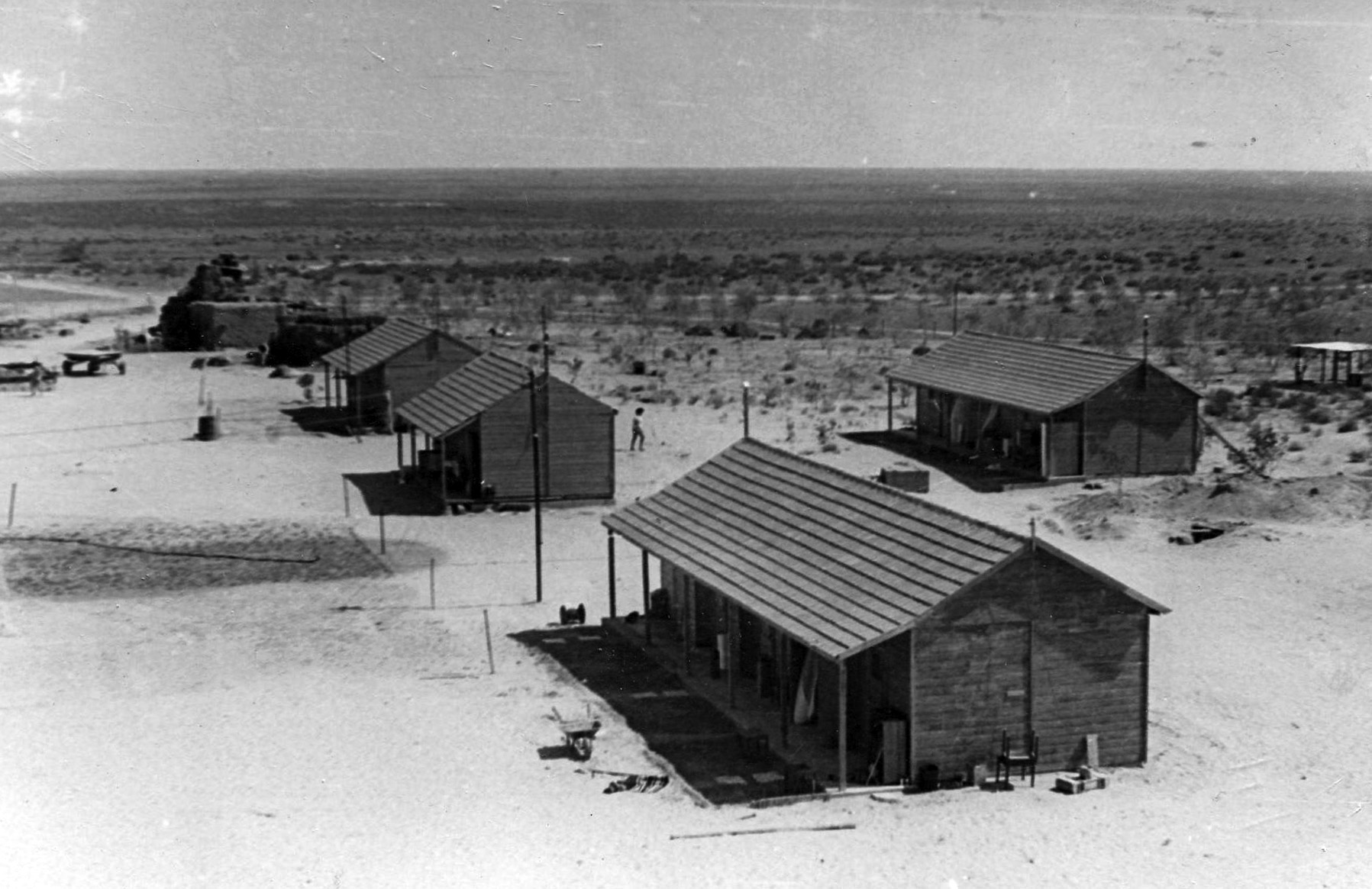
Nir Yitzhak soon after its establishment

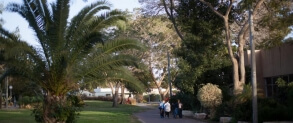
The kibbutz in 2020

The kibbutz was established after the 1948 Arab-Israeli War on 8 December 1949, and like Mashabei Sadeh, was named for Palmach commander Yitzhak Sadeh. It is affiliated with the Hashomer Hatzair youth movement. The kibbutz hosts the Garin Tzabar program, a framework for non-Israeli Jews who volunteer to serve in the Israel Defense Forces.

=== 2023 attack ===
On 7 October 2023 Nir Yitzhak was attacked by Hamas militants from Gaza, who killed and kidnapped several of its residents. Two of the hostages were freed in February 2024 by the Israeli military, while others died in captivity and their bodies are still being held in Gaza.

== Economy ==
Shahen Agriculture Co. is a field crop production company jointly owned by Kibbutz Nir Yitzhak and Kibbutz Kerem Shalom.

== The Kibbutz ==
According to JNF, the elders of the kibbutz recount "there was only one tree, a dirt road leading to it, and water occasionally arriving by trucks". Today the Kibbutz has an agricultural sector as well as other services including education where children from the area come to study.

== Notable residents ==
- Ido Bachelet, scientist
- Adam Berdichevsky (born 1983), Paralympic wheelchair tennis player

== See also ==
- Gaza war
- Moshe Dayan's eulogy for Ro'i Rothberg
