= Nir Yitzhak attack =

2023 fatal attack by Hamas in Israel

- Part of the October 7 attacks
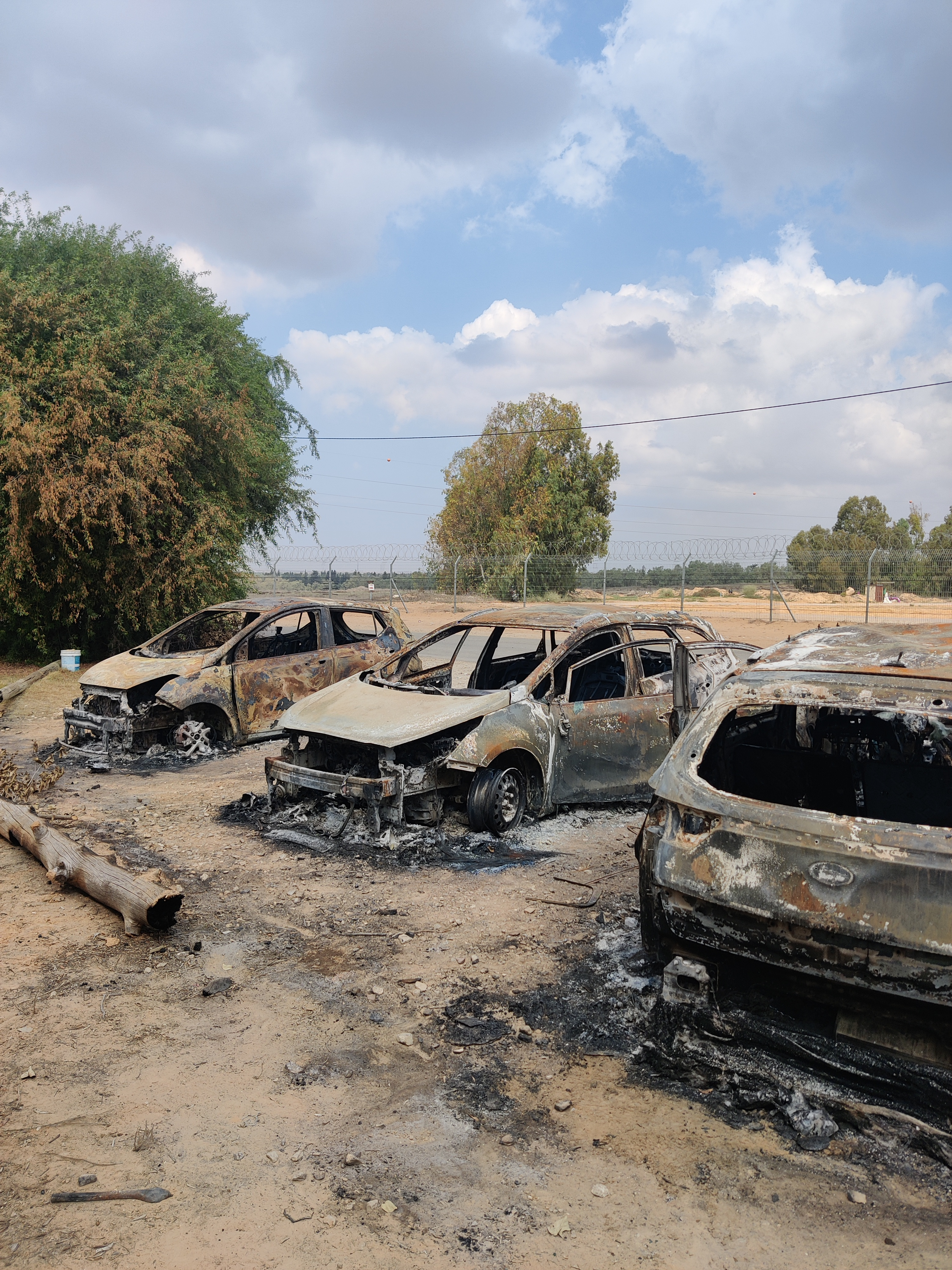
- Kibbutz vehicles burned during the attack
Date	7 October 2023; 2 years ago
Location	Nir Yitzhak, Southern District, Israel 31°14′14″N 34°21′26″E
Result	Palestinian victory

Belligerents
Hamas	Israel

Commanders and leaders
(Hamas) Unknown	(Israel) Unknown

Units involved
(Hamas) Al-Qassam Brigades; Nuseirat Battalion	(Israel) Israeli Defence Forces (Israel) Kibbutz Nir Yitzhak security team

Strength
Unknown	Unknown

Casualties and losses
(Hamas) Unknown	6 kibbutz security officers killed 1 soldier killed 2 civilians injured 7 captured
- Location within the Gaza Strip

On 7 October 2023, the Hamas Nuseirat Battalion attacked Nir Yitzhak, a kibbutz close to the border fence with the Gaza Strip, as part of a surprise attack on Israel.

Two civilian members of the kibbutz's security team including its leader, and one IDF soldier, were known to have been killed on the day of the attack. Four other team members who were originally noted as missing and presumed abducted, were subsequently also identified as being killed on that day. This includes two whose bodies were taken to Gaza.

Seven civilian residents were taken captive. Two hostages were released before crossing into Gaza. Three were released during the 2023 Israeli–Palestinian prisoner exchange. The final two were freed by the IDF in a targeted mission Operation Golden Hand in Rafah.

== History of Kibbutz Nir Yitzhak ==
Nir Yitzhak is a kibbutz in Israel's northwestern Negev desert, established after the 1948 Palestine war on 8 December 1949, and named after Palmach commander Yitzhak Sadeh. Affiliated with the Hashomer Hatzair youth movement, it supports the "Garin Tzabar" program for non-Israeli Jews serving in the Israel Defense Forces (IDF). As of 2021, it had a population of 649.

The kibbutz founded the Chemada Factory 30 years ago. It is now owned by the Topaz Company. It is defined as an essential factory running 24 hours every day. It produces bromide-based chemicals for pharmaceutical, cosmetics and agricultural use, with all its product being exported. The kibbutz co-owns Shahen Agriculture Co., specializing in field crop production, with Kibbutz Kerem Shalom.

== Attack ==
At around 6:30 on the morning of 7 October 2023, kibbutz residents were awoken by red alert sirens and what seemed to be louder than usual Iron Dome intercepter activity. They took shelter in their safe rooms, for what they expected to be a short period.

At 6:50 the Kibbutz security team were alerted to a potential attack and told to keep their two-way radios on. Seven members of the team took up defensive positions along the western fence of the kibbutz. They expected, at most, an attack on foot from Gaza, and, at worst, an attempt to breach the kibbutz fence. They believed they were in a superior defensive position to ward off such an attack.

The security team were unaware that the Hamas Nuseirat Battalion had arrived in vehicles at the front gate of the kibbutz and gained entry. They set up sniper positions around the area. A kibbutz resident living near the gate saw what he referred to as fifteen militants entering the kibbutz. After returning to his safe room where his family were sheltering, he warned his neighbours what was happening on WhatsApp. Although his safe room was not breached he did hear screams from the house behind him. This turned out to be Clara Marman's house. She and 4 of her family members were abducted to Gaza.

An elderly couple, the Rosen's, were also abducted. When they arrived on foot at the breached Gaza border fence, they argued that they could go no further because of their injuries. Their abductors allowed them to return to the kibbutz.

The Hamas militants were then caught on security cameras attempting to lure the workers in the Chemada Factory out of the building by lighting bales of paper in front of the factory on fire. This attempt was unsuccessful because the workers and security in the building had access to the security camera. They were able to barricade themselves securely in the main factory floor. The militants did damage other parts of the factory and took equipment. The factory was able to resume production after the kibbutz was secured.

The security team sent a member to investigate the smoke coming from the factory, considered to be the safest part of the kibbutz. When that member did not return another was sent. These members were killed by militant snipers. It was only after this at around 9:00 that the security team began to understand the unprecedented scale of the attack.

The kibbutz security team fought the militants in an attempt to protect the residents, without IDF support. Gunfire was exchanged and grenades were used against the team. At a certain point, the militants left taking the hostages and equipment. They were replaced by looters who were the main people residents heard ransacking their houses.

The kibbutz residents were locked in safe rooms for over 14 hours, without access to water, food or sanitation. Messages were received outside the kibbutz's that residents in their safe rooms could still hear people outside at 14:00. They heard shooting, and their houses being ransacked. Besides the Rosen and Marman/Leimberg houses where the occupants were abducted, no other safety rooms on the kibbutz were reported as breached.

The IDF only arrived at the kibbutz 12–13 hours after the attack began, when the militants had left and only looters remained. The LOTAR unit cleared the kibbutz and protected residents overnight. They assisted in the evacuation of the kibbutz the next day.

== Casualties and hostages ==
=== Security team ===
The kibbutz's security team's sergeant major, Yaron Shahar, and another response team member, Ofek Arazi, were killed in the attack.

Four members of the response team, Boaz Avraham, Oren Goldin, Tal Haimi and Lior Rudaeff, were missing and assumed to have been abducted. It subsequently became known that all four of them (Avraham, Goldin, Chaimi, and Rudaeff) were killed on the day of the attack. Chaimi and Rudaeff's bodies were taken to Gaza.

=== Hostages ===
Moshe and Diana Rosen, elderly residents of the kibbutz, were injured when Hamas militants shot the lock of their safe room. They were then walked to the Israel-Gaza border and told to proceed into Gaza. The couple refused arguing that they could not continue because of their injuries. After heated discussion between Diana and the militant leader, they were set free and told to go back to the kibbutz, which they did. They were later treated in hospital for their wounds.

The five members of the Marman/Leimberg family who were at the kibbutz at the time of attack were abducted as hostages to Gaza. Clara Marman and her partner Luis Har are residents of the kibbutz. They were being visited by Clara's brother Fernando Marman, sister Gabriela Leimberg and her 17-year old niece Mia. Mia had brought the Leimberg's family dog, Bella, with for the visit.

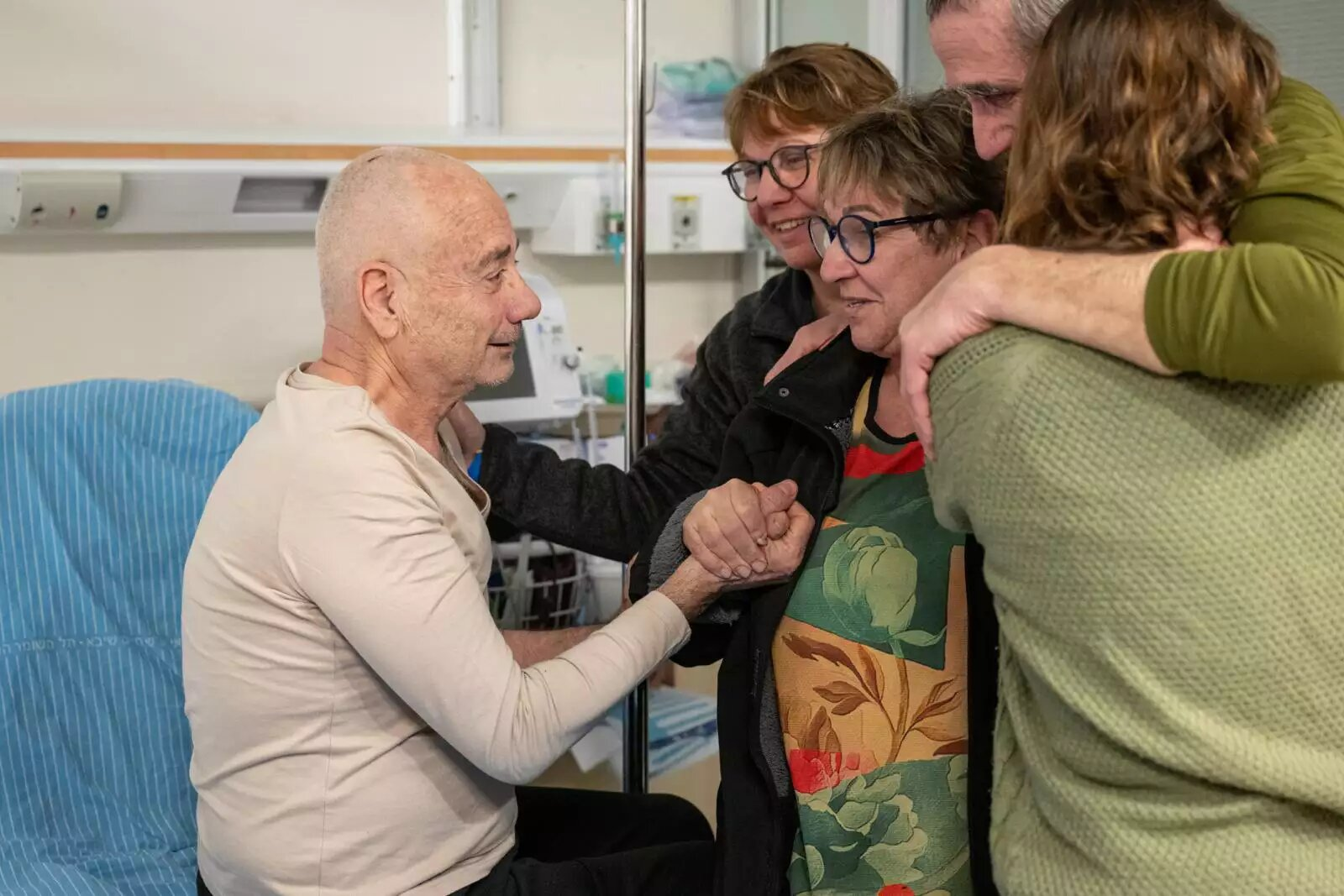
Luis Har (left) and Fernando Marman (second from right) reuniting with family after rescue by IDF

Released hostage Mia Leimberg with her father, and dog who was with her during the captivity

When the family were kidnapped Mia took Bella with her hidden under her pajamas. The abductors only realized the dog was present when they arrived at the tunnels where the hostages were kept. They allowed Mia to keep the Bella, who she credited with reducing the trauma she felt. Bella was released with Mia when she, her mother and aunt were released as part of the Israeli–Palestinian prisoner exchange on 28 November 2023.

The two men taken hostage from the family, Luis Har and Fernando Marman, were freed by the IDF during a targeted mission, operation Golden Hand, in the city of Rafah on 12 February 2024. They were held in captivity for 129 days. The men were freed from a second floor apartment during an IDF air strike operation in the area. They had lost weight, but otherwise showed no physical signs of harm. They were reunited with their family at the Sheba medical center in central Israel. Gaza Health officials said that 67 Palestinians were killed during the air strike including woman and children.

=== IDF ===
One Israeli soldier, Ofir Melman, was killed during the fighting.

=== Hamas ===
Sources do not mention if any Hamas militants were injured or killed during the attack. The surviving response team members indicate that at some time after the unsuccessful attempt on the factory, taking of the hostages and various firefights, the militants left the kibbutz, and were replaced by looters who did most of the ransacking of residential houses.

== See also ==
- Re'im music festival massacre
- List of massacres in Israel
- List of massacres during the 2023 Israel–Hamas war
- Outline of the Gaza war
