= Dominique Bachelet =

Climate change scientist

- Education: Colorado State University (Ph.D.)--Botany and Plant Pathology; Université des Sciences et Techniques (MS)--Plant Biology
- Known for: Dynamic Fire Modeling; Climate Change Impacts Modeling; Ecosystems Ecology; Science communication
- Awards: AAAS Fellow, 2017
- Scientific career
- Fields: Environmental Services
- Workplaces: Oregon State University
- Website: https://bee.oregonstate.edu/users/dominique-bachelet

Dominique Bachelet is a senior climate change scientist and associate professor in Oregon State University, with over 38 years of education and work in the fields of climate change, fire, and ecology. She has worked to make science more accessible, by creating web based resources with various scientific organizations (e.g.Conservation Biology Institute, The Nature Conservancy). She returned to Oregon State University in 2017 but has continued her outreach work, getting valuable information to students, scientists, and scholars.

== Education and career ==
Bachelet spent most of her college time in France studying plant biology, ecology, and pathology. She earned DEUG B (Diplôme d'études universitaires générales) in 1976 in the Université des Sciences et Techniques. and a year later her bachelor's degree. In 1978 she completed a master's degree in plant biology and in 1979 finished her DEA (Diplôme d'études approfondies). Bachelet received her Ph.D. in 1983 in Colorado State University.

Bachelet served as a quantitative ecologist from 1988 to 1994 in Environmental Protection Agency's Environmental Research Lab in Corvallis. She started at Oregon State University in 1988, where she is an associate professor. While at OSU, she has also served as the director of climate change science from 2007 to 2008 in the Nature Conservancy, and then in 2009 she became the senior climate change scientist in the Conservation Biology Institute. From 2013 to 2015, Bachelet delivered dozens of presentations to environmental science organizations talking about climate change and its impacts on the ecosystem.

== Research ==
Bachelet is known for her work focusing on the impacts climate change and associated disturbances have on vegetation and carbon budgets, for example her work was part of the first dynamic global vegetation model MC1. Her contributions to the field of "climate change science, particularly using simulation modeling of ecosystem response to environmental change" were the basis for her election as a fellow to the American Association of the Advancement of Science. Her modeling work has been critical in advancing global fire models and understanding the multiple interactions between the biosphere and atmosphere.

Bachelet has been involved in a number of collaborative projects with Oregon State, Conservation Biology Institute, and data Basin, that are aimed at communicating climate change information to the community.

- Packaging Usable Climate Change Information for Sagebrush (2015)
- Climate-smart seedlot selection tool (2016), Creating Useful and Usable Climate Tools (2016)
- Sagebrush Managers and Climate Change Tools (2014)
- Creating a Soil Vulnerability Index to identify drought sensitive areas (2011 to 2013)
- Estimating carbon pools and fluxes using a DGVM with prescribed land use: MC1 contribution to the Land Carbon project (2012 to 2016)
- Integrated scenarios of climate, hydrology, and vegetation for the Northwest and Projecting Future Effects of Land Management, Natural Disturbance, and CO_{2} on Woody Encroachment in the Northern Great Plains in a Changing Climate (2012 to 2014)
- Soil Vulnerability to future climate in the Southern Rockies Landscape Conservation Cooperative, with implications for vegetation change and water cycle (2015)

== Awards ==
- American Association for the Advancement of Science Fellow, 2017
- At Oregon State University, she has earned 10, 20, and 25 Years Services Award for her contributions to campus.

== Personal life ==
Dominique Bachelet speaks both French and English. While often busy with her researches in the field, she enjoys outdoor activities like hiking, biking, and sea kayaking.
