= Ido Bachelet =

Israeli-Chilean researcher

- עידו בצלת
- Born: Nir Yitzhak, Israel
- Education: Hebrew University of Jerusalem (Faculty of Medicine) Massachusetts Institute of Technology Harvard Medical School
- Scientific career
- Fields: Bio-inspired engineering; DNA origami; Nanorobotics; RNA therapeutics
- Workplaces: Reichman University
- Academic advisors: George Church

Ido Bachelet (Hebrew: עידו בצלת) is an Israeli-Chilean scientist.

== Education ==
Bachelet earned his Ph.D. in medical sciences from the Hebrew University in Jerusalem, and did two postdoctoral fellowships, engineering at M.I.T. and biologically inspired engineering at the George Church lab at Harvard University. His fields of expertise include DNA origami, synthetic biology, and biomimetics. He taught life sciences at Bar-Ilan University and industrial design at the Bezalel Academy of Arts and Design in Jerusalem. His research on bio-inspired architecture was selected to represent Israel at the 16th Venice Biennale of Architecture.

== Research ==
Bachelet is known for his contribution to the fields of DNA origami, nanotechnology, and nanorobotics. His paper "A logic-gated nanorobot for targeted transport of molecular payloads", which deals with nanoscale robots' ability to kill cancer cells, created an important interface between the field of DNA origami and medicine. Recently, Bachelet raised the hypothesis of ribozyme mass extinction, and described intact nucleic acids found in the Zag meteorite.

== Personal life ==
Bachelet, born in Kibbutz Nir Yitzhak to Uri and Shelly, lives in Boston and Israel. His cousin, Michelle Bachelet is the former two-term President of Chile.
