= Chaim Peri =

Israeli artist and curator

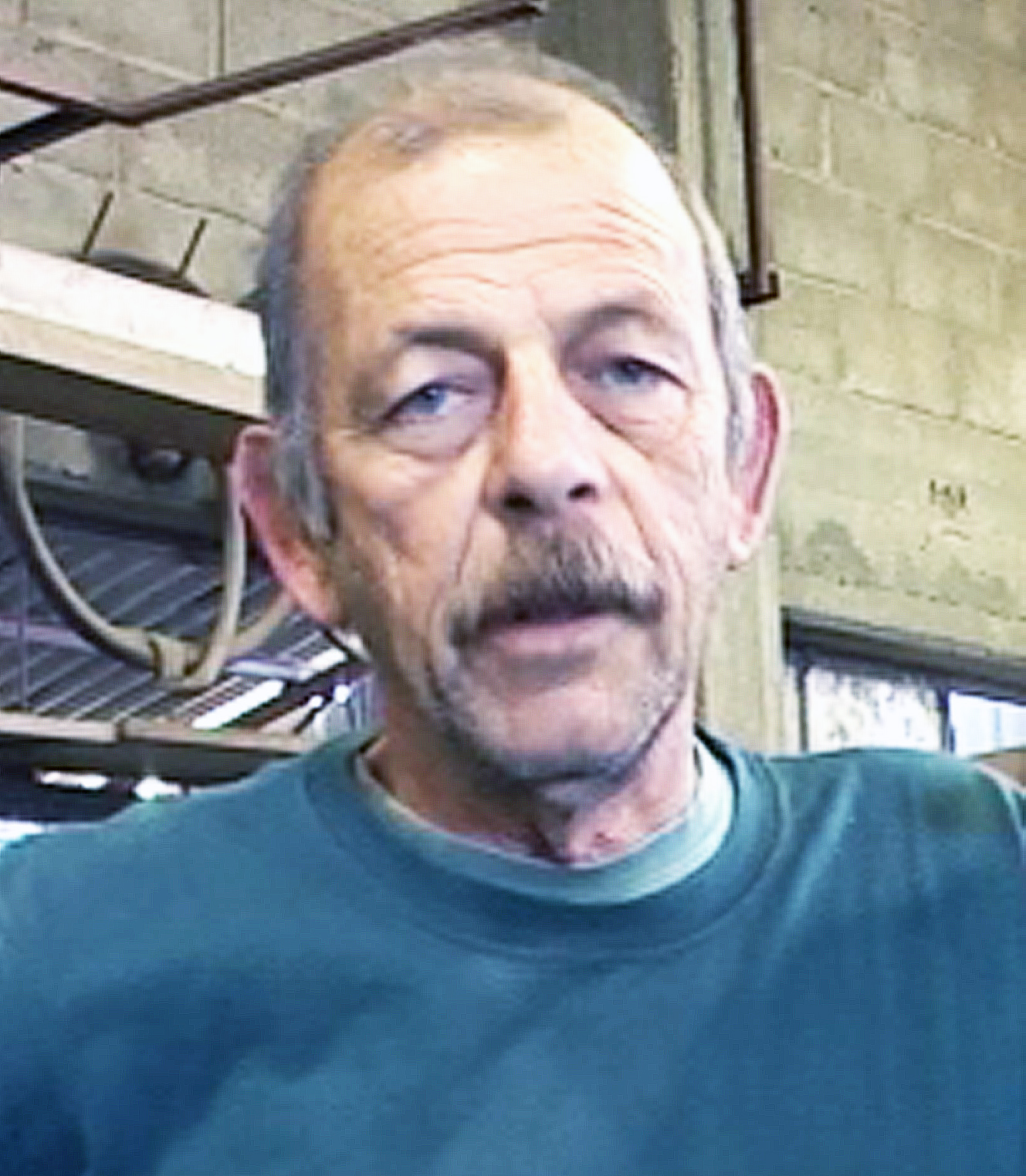
- Born: 13 April 1944
- Died: 2024 (aged 79–80); Gaza Strip

Chaim Peri (Hebrew: חיים פרי) was an Israeli artist and curator. He was abducted in the October 7 attacks and killed while in captivity.

== Biography ==
Chaim Peri was born in 1944. After serving in the Nahal Brigade, he moved to southern Israel to help found Nir Oz. He met his first wife, Batya, at the kibbutz. Their daughter, Inbal, was born in 1968, and their son, Lior, in 1973. After their divorce, Peri remarried and had two more daughters. At the time of Peri's death, he was the grandfather of thirteen children.

== Career and activities ==
Peri was a sculptor, filmmaker, and children's book author.

Peri founded an alternative exhibition space, The White House, in an abandoned building that he renovated in Nir Oz in 1999. Peri is widely credited with exhibiting lesser-known artists who had not been shown elsewhere at The White House, including Pavel Wolberg and David Gerstein. He also installed sculptures, his own and those of Menashe Kadishman and others, on the exhibition space's outdoor grounds. Curator Avi Lubin, speaking to The Art Newspaper about The White House in 2025, said, "On the one hand, [Peri] hosted tons of active artists. And on the other hand, in terms of location, it’s in the middle of nowhere—it’s not in a town, it’s not easy to get to, especially without a car—but his hospitality was very enabling and free."

Peri was a volunteer for Road to Recovery, an Israeli charity that transports Palestinians in need of medical care within Israel. A veteran of four major wars, Peri had later become a peace activist and participated in an anti-war protest during the Second Intifada.

== Abduction, captivity and death ==
Hamas militants abducted Peri from his home in the Nir Oz attack, whereas his wife escaped. Fellow hostage Adina Moshe, released in the 2023 Gaza war ceasefire, later recounted that while arguing with Peri the latter had stated that the hostages were not a priority for Benjamin Netanyahu, and that they would only be released in two years, "because we are leftists".

In December 2023, Hamas released a video featuring Peri and two other elderly hostages from Nir Oz, Amiram Cooper and Yoram Metzger, asking the Israeli government to halt the war and secure their release; three months later, they released another video claiming all three had died in an air strike.

On June 3, 2024, the IDF announced the death of Peri, along with those of Cooper, Metzger, and Nadav Popplewell. In August 2024, the Israel Defense Forces announced they had recovered the remains of six hostages, including Peri, from a tunnel in Khan Younis. The IDF stated they believed their captors executed them during airstrikes during the prior February.

== See also ==
- List of Gaza war hostages
