= Youth (2013 film) =

2013 Israeli film

- Film poster
- Directed by: Tom Shoval
- Written by: Tom Shoval
- Produced by: Gal Greenspan, Roy Kurland (Green Productions), Moshe Edry, Leon Edry (United King)
- Starring: David Cunio, Eitan Cunio, Gita Amelie
- Cinematography: Yaron Scharf
- Edited by: Joel Alexis
- Music by: Elam Wellman, Roy Chen
- Production company: Green Productions
- Distributed by: United King (Israel), Match Factory (worldwide)
- Release date: 10 February 2013 (BIFF)
- Running time: 107 minutes
- Countries: Germany; Israel
- Languages: Hebrew; English

Youth is a feature film written and directed by Tom Shoval. The film, released in 2013, is an Israeli-German co-production. Its premiere took place as part of the Panorama section at the 63rd Berlin International Film Festival on February 10, 2013.

Shoval later revisited the film, including footage in his 2025 documentary A Letter to David. It is a cinematic letter to David Cunio, who previously starred in Youth, and who was abducted by Hamas during the October 7 attacks in 2023 from Nir Oz, and held hostage in Gaza.

== Plot ==
Yaki and Shaul are two brothers, teenage boys who share a deep, almost telepathic bond. After their father loses his job, their family faces severe financial difficulties and heavy debts. Yaki and Shaul feel they cannot stand idly by and watch their family fall apart. The fact that Yaki has recently enlisted in the army and has access to a weapon allows them to take their fate into their own hands.

== Cast ==
Actor/Actress	Character Name	About the Character
David Cunio	Yaki Cooper	The older brother, serving in the army.
Eitan Cunio	Shaul Cooper	The younger brother.
Moshe Ivgy	Mordechai (Moti) Cooper	The father.
Shirili Desha	Paula Cooper	The mother.
Gita Amely	Dafna Edelman	The kidnapped girl.
Uri Hochman	Itzik	Moti's friend.
Noa Koler	Esti	Paula's sister.
Gilad Kleter	Eli	Esti's husband.
Alex Peleg	Shalom	Father of Paula and Esti, grandfather of the brothers.
Gadi Dorfman	Hazi	Yaki's friend who lends him a car.
Yogev Yifat	-	Yaki's commander in the army.
Shachar Peretz	Nesli	Esti's daughter.

== Production ==
Shoval began working on the film after completing his studies in 2008. Gal Greenshpan, his classmate, who produced his graduation film Petah Tikva, became one of the film's producers with his production company, Green Productions. Shoval and Greenshpan toured Europe with a draft of the script, presenting it in pitching sessions, where it won several awards. The Rabinovich Foundation – Cinema Project decided to support the film, and United King Films, Moshe and Leon Edry, joined as co-producers and distributors. The German company One Two Films also joined the production. Additionally, ARTE TV channel, Media network, the German Medienboard fund, and the German sales company MATCH FACTORY partnered in the project.

For the lead roles, Shoval sought two young brothers with a close bond, who not only resembled each other physically but also had strong acting abilities. The casting process took about a year, led by casting director Orit Azulay. They chose David and Ethan Cunio, two brothers for whom this was their first on-screen role. The brothers committed to an extensive process of workshops, rehearsals, and training to prepare for the demanding roles.

For the role of the girl Dafna, Gita Amelie, an actress at the beginning of her career, was cast. In addition, well-known actors such as Moshe Ivgy, Shirili Desha, Uri Hochman, Gilad Kleter, Alex Peleg, Noa Koler, and others were cast in the film.

The film was shot by Yaron Scharf (Footnote, Shiva) and edited by Joelle Alexis (A Film Unfinished, Plasticine). The music was composed by Ilam Wollman and Roy Chen, with additional music by Liran Reiter, the song Tu Te Reconnaitras by Anne-Marie David, and Insomnicide by the band These Immortal Souls.

== Reception ==
The film won the Haggiag Prize for Best Israeli Feature Film (the Grand Prize), as well as the Acting Award for Eitan and David Cunio and the Editing Award for Joëlle Alexis at the Jerusalem Film Festival in 2013.

The Youth won the first prize at the Taipei Film Festival.

The film also received first prizes at the Thessaloniki and Sofia Pitching Forums, as well as at the Berlin Film Festival, the Co-Production Market. In March 2013, it participated in the CPH:PIX Festival in Copenhagen. In June 2013, it was featured at the Karlovy Vary International Film Festival in the Czech Republic, as well as at festivals in Durban (South Africa), Paris Cinema, and the Cinema South Festival in Sderot. Eitan and David Cunio won the Acting Award at the Durban Film Festival in South Africa in 2013.

== October 7 aftermath ==
Over a decade later, David Cunio and another brother, Ariel Cunio, were themselves victims of kidnapping, by Hamas terrorists on October 7, 2023, and were held hostage in Gaza for 738 days. David's wife Sharon Cunio and their twin three-year-old daughters were also taken hostage from Kibbutz Nir Oz on October 7, 2023, along with Sharon’s sister and her daughter. On the same day, David’s younger brother Ariel Cunio and his girlfriend, Arbel Yehoud, were taken captive as well. Sharon Cunio, her daughters and her sister and her daughter, were all released in November 2023. Yehoud was released at the end of January 2025, having been held the entire time in isolation by Islamic Jihad. The Cunio brothers were finally released on October 13th, 2025 during the Gaza peace plan ceasefire, after more than two years in captivity.
