= Kidnapping of Ariel Cunio =

Israeli hostage taken by Hamas in 2023

- Part of Gaza war hostage crisis
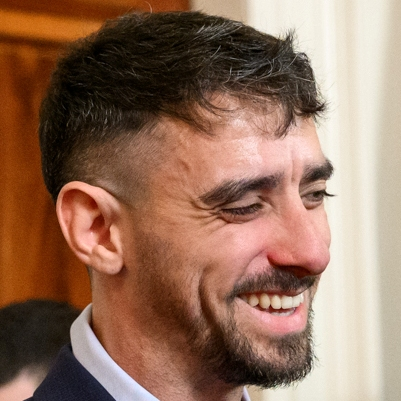
- Cunio at the White House in 2025
- Date: October 7, 2023 – October 13, 2025
- Duration: 737 days
- Location: Nir Oz, southern Israel

Ariel Cunio (Hebrew: אריאל קוניו; born 12 June 1997) is an Israeli man who was abducted to the Gaza Strip with his brother David and others, on 7 October 2023 during the massacre at Kibbutz Nir Oz and was released on 13 October 2025, as part of the Israel–Hamas agreement.

== Early life ==
Ariel Cunio was born to Silvia and Luis Cunio, an Argentine-born couple, and grew up in Kibbutz Nir Oz in southern Israel. His parents had been members of the Hashomer Hatzair youth movement while living in Argentina. Raised on the kibbutz, Cunio spent most of his life in Nir Oz, where he lived with his family and was an active member of the local community. He has three older brothers: Lucas, and twin brothers David and Eitan. David was kidnapped alongside Ariel.

Before 7 October 2023, Ariel was in a long-term relationship with Arbel Yehoud, with whom he lived in the Kibbutz. Ariel and Yehoud had just returned to Nir Oz from an extended trip to South America and Central America and had adopted a puppy weeks earlier.

== Abduction ==
On the morning of 7 October 2023, Ariel and Yehoud were in Kibbutz Nir Oz when Hamas militants infiltrated the kibbutz. They were abducted together from their home and taken into the Gaza Strip. Yehoud's brother, Dolev, was originally thought to have been abducted until his body was identified in June 2024. Several other members of the Cunio family were kidnapped from Nir Oz that day, including Cunio's brother David, David's wife Sharon, their twin three-year-old daughters, Emma and Yuli, Curio's sister-in law Danielle Aloni, and his niece Emilia Aloni. In total, eight members of the family were taken hostage, the largest number from a single family during the 7 October attack.

== Captivity ==
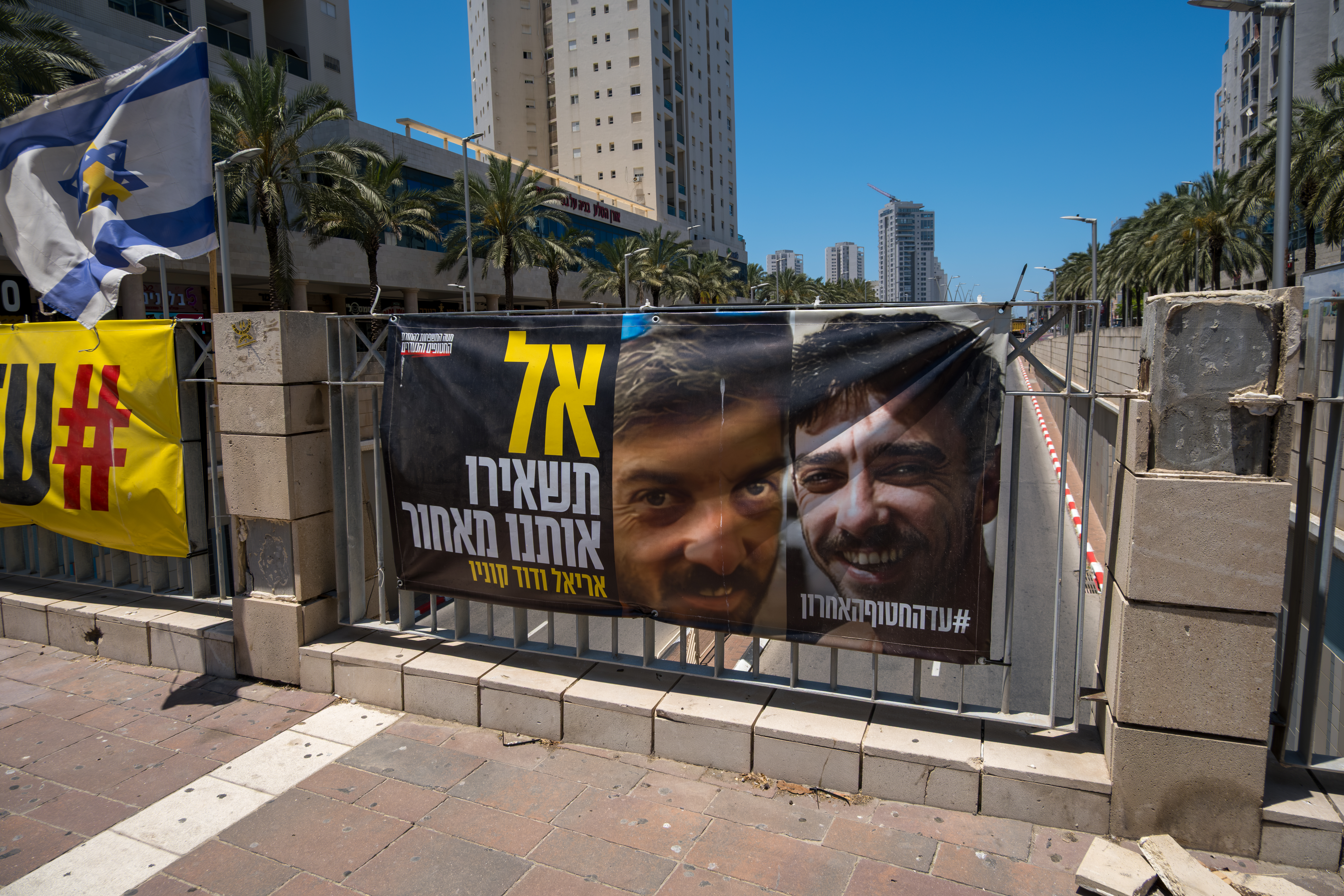
A sign in Ashdod featuring photos of Ariel and his brother David Cunio alongside the text: "Don't leave us behind".

Following his abduction on 7 October 2023, during the Hamas-led attack on Kibbutz Nir Oz, Cunio was held in Islamic Jihad captivity in the Gaza Strip, largely isolated from other hostages, with only limited information available about his condition.

Families of hostages, including that of Ariel and his brother David, actively campaigned for proof of life throughout their captivity. No publicly circulated official proof of life specific to Cunio had been released, despite such notifications being issued for other hostages.

On 27 November 2023, Cunio's sister-in-law and her two daughters were released from captivity as part of a hostage-release agreement.

On 30 January 2025, Yehoud, Cunio's life partner was released during the second hostage-release deal.

In February 2025, the film A Letter to David, directed by Tom Shoval premiered at the 75th Berlin International Film Festival. During the red-carpet event, the filmmakers displayed images of Ariel and his brother David in an effort to raise awareness of their continued captivity.

== Release ==
After more than two years in Palestinian Islamic Jihad captivity, on 13 October 2025, Cunio was released as part of a mediated ceasefire and hostage exchange deal between Israel and Hamas. He arrived back in Israel alongside his brother David and other surviving hostages. Upon arrival in Israel, Ariel Cunio was taken to Sheba Medical Center in Ramat Gan for initial medical evaluation and care.

On 19 October 2025, Cunio was discharged from Sheba Medical Center along with his brother David and Yosef Haim Ohana.

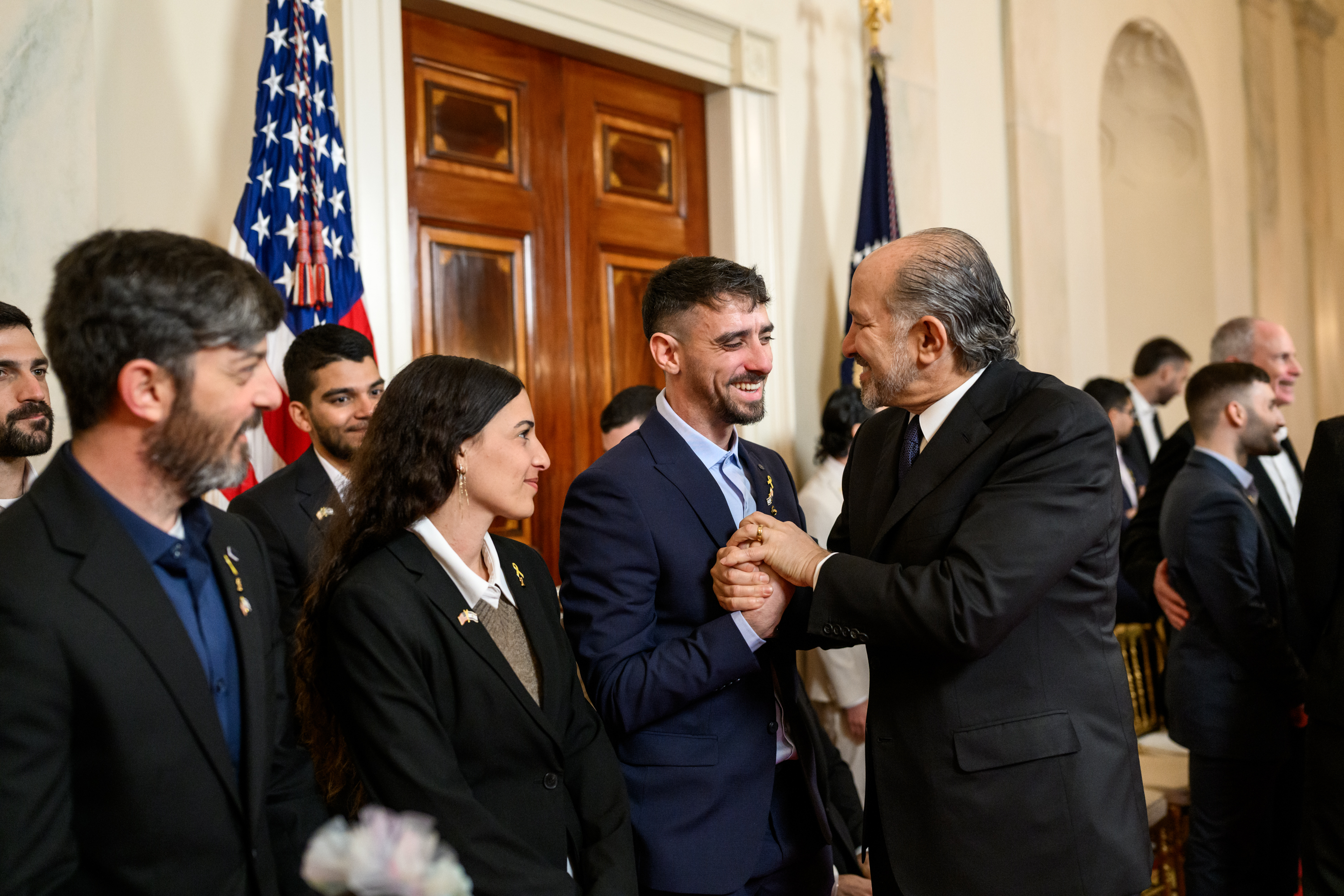
Cunio (right) meeting U.S. Secretary of Commerce Howard Lutnick alongside Yehoud (center) and David Cunio (left).

== Post-release activities ==
Following his release and hospitalization, Cunio returned home and began a process of physical and psychological rehabilitation.

In November 2025, Cunio participated in an official visit to the United States, where he was among a group of freed Israeli hostages who met with U.S. President Donald Trump at the White House. Ariel attended the event together with other former hostages, including his brother David Cunio and his girlfriend Arbel Yehoud.

== See also ==
- List of Gaza war hostages
