= David Cunio =

Israeli actor and former hostage (born 1990)

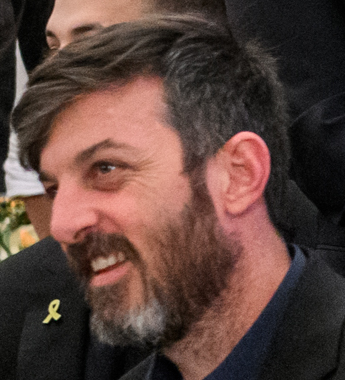
- Cunio in 2025
- Born: May 21, 1990 (age 36)
- Known for: the Gaza war hostage crisis

David Cunio (Hebrew: דוד קוניו; born May 21, 1990) is an Israeli electrical engineer and actor who was taken hostage by Hamas during the October 7 2023 attacks at Kibbutz Nir Oz along with his brother, Ariel Cunio, and others, and was released on October 13, 2025, as part of an Israel–Hamas agreement.

== Early life ==
David Cunio was born to Silvia and Luis Cunio, an Argentine-born couple, and grew up in Kibbutz Nir Oz. While living in Argentina, his parents were members of the Hashomer Hatzair youth movement. He has an older brother, Lucas, a twin brother, Eitan, and a younger brother, Ariel, who was also kidnapped to Gaza from Nir Oz.

=== Acting career ===
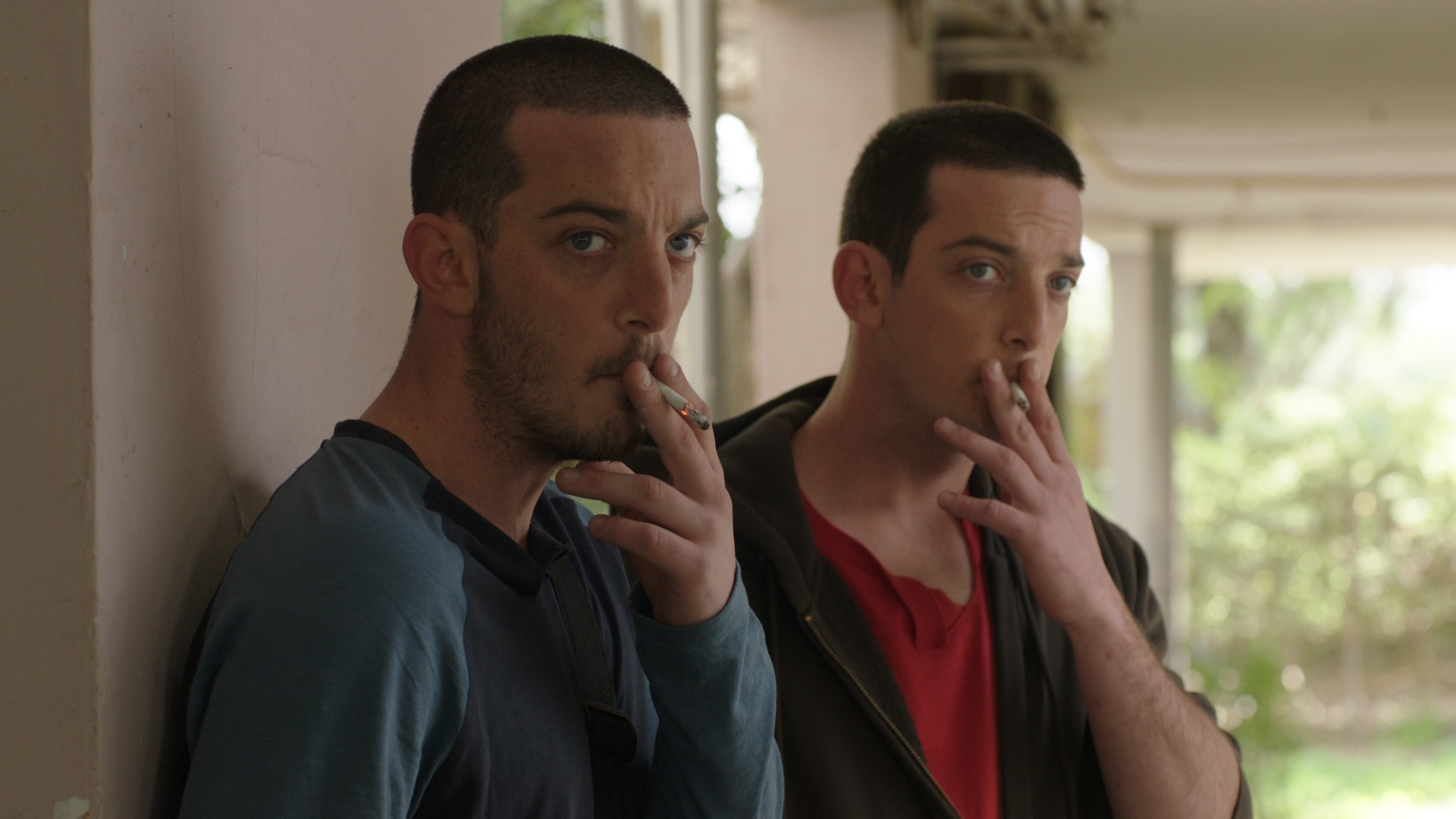
David and Eitan Cunio in the movie Youth

In 2013, David made his acting debut alongside his twin brother Eitan in the feature film Youth (HaNoar), directed by Tom Shoval. The film premiered in the Panorama section of the Berlin International Film Festival and achieved some international acclaim. The brothers portrayed two siblings whose relationship is shaped by family and financial pressures. Although neither had prior professional acting experience, their performances were noted in contemporary reviews.

Youth was screened at numerous international film festivals, and David and Eitan received Best Acting Awards at the 2013 Jerusalem Film Festival and the 2013 Durban International Film Festival in South Africa for their performances. Despite the film's critical reception and awards, David did not pursue further acting roles and returned to civilian life outside the film industry.

Cunio's acting work in Youth was later revisited in the documentary film A Letter to David (February 2025), also directed by Tom Shoval, which reflects on the making of the film and on Cunio's life following the Hamas attack of October 7, 2023. The film premiered at the 75th Berlin International Film Festival. During the red-carpet event, the filmmakers displayed images of David and his brother Ariel in an effort to raise awareness of their continued captivity.

== Abduction ==
On October 7, 2023, during the Hamas-led massacre in Kibbutz Nir Oz, David Cunio was abducted to Gaza along with his wife, Sharon, their twin three-year-old daughters, Emma and Yuli, his sister-in law Danielle Aloni, and his niece Emilia Aloni. His younger brother Ariel was also abducted, together with Ariel's partner, Arbel Yehud.

David was hiding in the safe room of his Nir Oz residence when Hamas gunmen set fire to it in an effort to force him out with his family, of whom they took 8 hostage, the largest number taken from a single family during the October 7 attack.

== Captivity ==
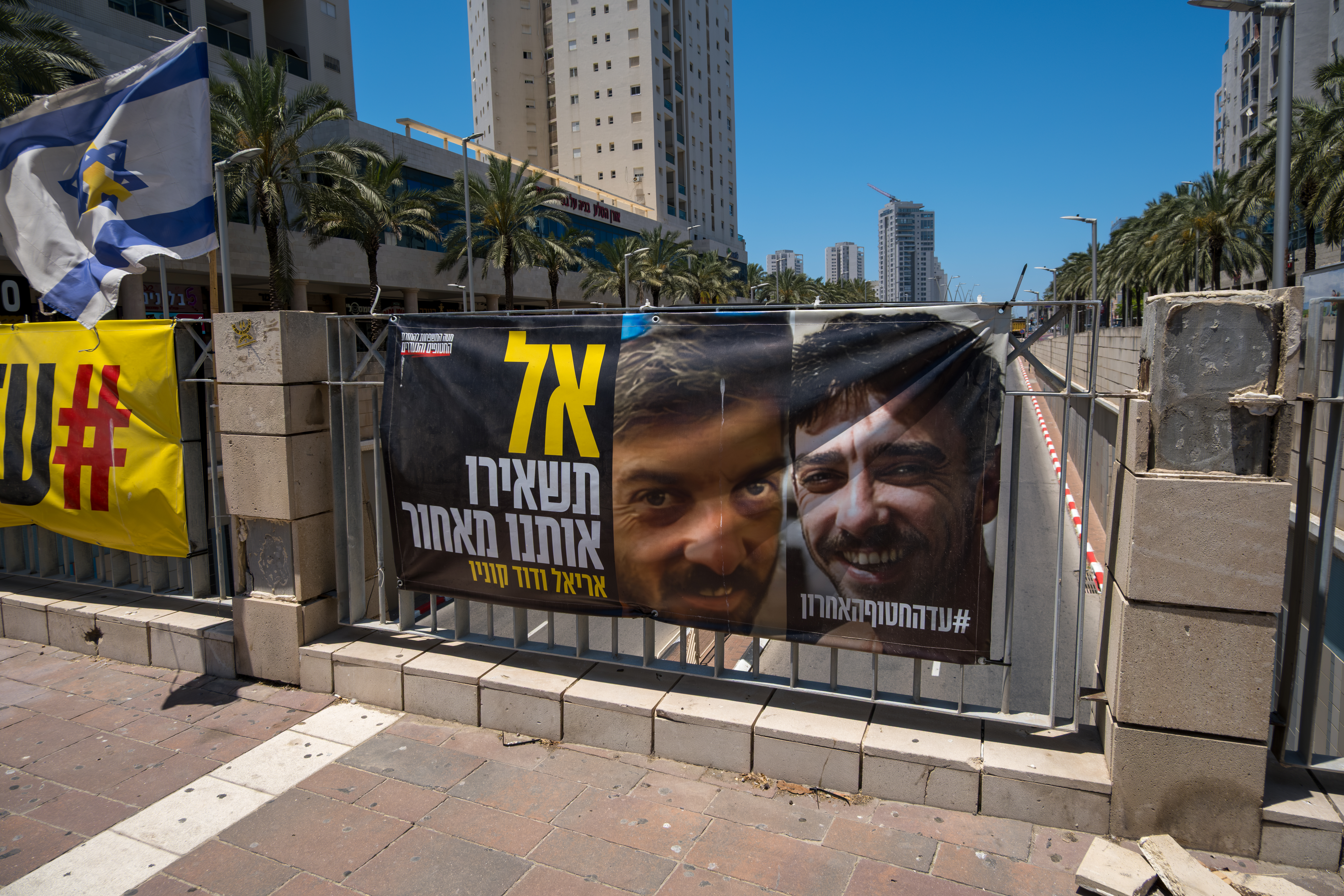
A sign in Ashdod featuring photos of David Cunio (left) and his brother Ariel (right) alongside the text: "Don't leave us behind." (in Hebrew)

During their abduction, Cunio, Sharon, and Yuli were separated from his other daughter, Emma. During the first ten days of their captivity, the three hostages were held in a Palestinian home in Khan Younis. Afterwards, the three hostages were moved to Nasser Hospital, where they were reunited with Emma a few days later. On November 24, 2023, Cunio was separated from his wife and children.

On November 27, 2023, Cunio's wife, and their two daughters were released from captivity as part of a hostage-release agreement. On the same day, Cunio was moved to the tunnels, where he encountered his best friend, Yarden Bibas. A few days later, Bibas would be moved to where Cunio was being held, where they would remain for a few weeks, before Bibas was moved again.

On January 30, 2025, Arbel Yehud, the partner of Cunio's brother Ariel, was released during the second hostage-release deal.

In January 2025, Cunio's wife publicly appealed in Arabic to Hamas, asking for a sign of life regarding David.

On February 17, 2025, Cunio's family received news that a recently released hostage had recently seen him alive in Gaza. Ahead of the second anniversary of his abduction, the family was invited to participate in events held in Argentina.

== Release ==
On October 13, 2025, David Cunio was released from Hamas captivity together with his brother Ariel as part of a hostage-release agreement.

On October 19, 2025, Cunio was discharged from Sheba Medical Center along with his brother Ariel and Yosef Haim Ohana.

== Post-release activities ==
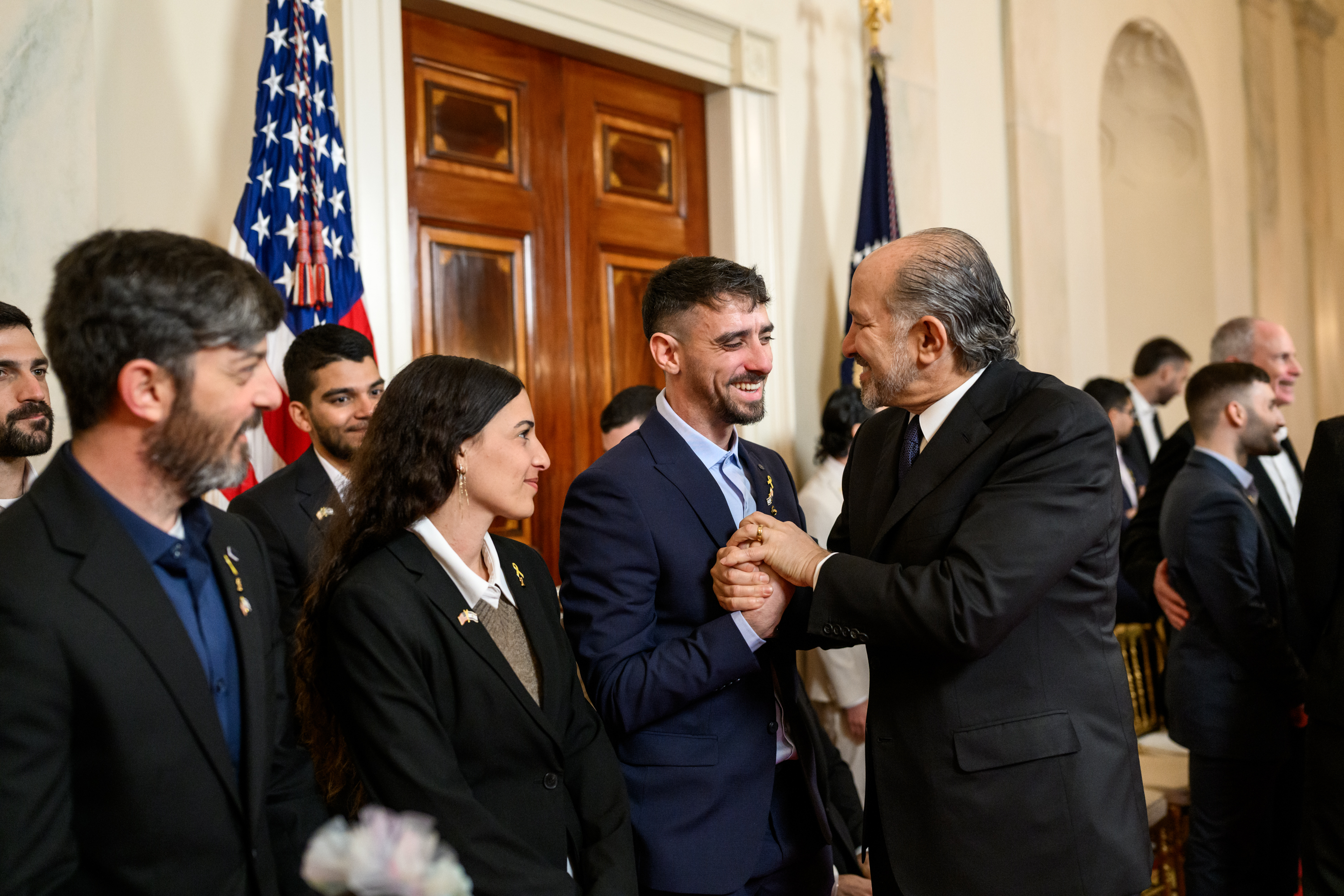
David Cunio (far left) in an official visit of the White House in which he, alongside his brother Ariel (third from left) and other released hostages met U.S. President Donald Trump

Following his release and hospitalization, Cunio returned home and began a process of physical and psychological rehabilitation.

In November 2025, Cunio participated in an official visit to the United States, where he was among a group of freed Israeli hostages who met with U.S. President Donald Trump at the White House. Cunio attended the event together with other former hostages, including his brother Ariel.

== See also ==
- List of Gaza war hostages
