= Of Dogs and Men =

- על כלבים ואנשים
- Directed by: Dani Rosenberg
- Written by: Dani Rosenberg; Ori Avinoam; Itay Tamir
- Produced by: Alexander Rodnyansky; Itai Tamir; Donatella Palermo
- Starring: Ori Avinoam; Yamit Avital; Nora Lifshitz; Lihu Nitzan
- Edited by: Nili Feller
- Music by: Yuval Semo
- Distributed by: RAI
- Release date: 5 September 2024
- Running time: 82 minutes
- Country: Israel
- Language: Hebrew

Of Dogs and Men (Hebrew: על כלבים ואנשים) is a 2024 Israeli docudrama directed by Dani Rosenberg, focusing on the aftermath of the 7 October attacks.

It is an international co-production with Italy's public broadcaster, RAI. It premiered at the 81st Venice International Film Festival on 5 September 2024.

== Plot summary ==
16-year-old Dar (Avinoam) returns to kibbutz Nir Oz following the Nir Oz attack on 7 October 2023. She searched in vain for her beloved dog, Shula, who went missing during the attack. Dar begins to have dreams where Shula befriends a Palestinian boy in the Gaza Strip. Dar also deals with the fact that her mother was abducted on October 7 and is believed to be held hostage in Gaza. In her conversations with soldiers, forensic pathologists, volunteers, and a kindergarten teacher, she learns more about the horrors of the attack on the kibbutz.

== Cast ==
- Ori Avinoam as Dar, a 16-year-old girl
- Yamit Avital as a Kindergarten teacher
- Nora Lifshitz as a dog rescuer
- Swell Ariel Or as diary voice of Dar's mother

== Production ==
Filming took place at Kibbutz Nir Oz only weeks after the October 7 attacks. The kibbutz was the scene of the Nir Oz attack on October 7, where an estimated 180 out of 400 residents died or taken as hostages to the Gaza Strip. Kibbutz survivors were also filmed for the project and speak directly to the camera. The dialogue in the film is mostly improvised and there was no set construction.

=== Release ===
It premiered at the 81st Venice International Film Festival on 5 September 2024 in the Orizzonti section. Artists For Palestine Italia launched an unsuccessful petition campaign to pull Israeli films, including Of Dogs and Men and Amos Gitai's Why War, from the festival. Producer, Alexander Rodnyansky criticised the petition as "misguided and shortsighted". Rodnyansky added that the film did not have prior screenings and that "No one who signed the petition has watched the film, Of Dogs And Men is anything but a piece of war propaganda or a call for vengeance." He thanked the festival's director, Alberto Barbera who, "instead of shying away from controversial and even explosive issues, chose to embrace them and make the festival a place where all points of view are represented and respected." Barbera told Deadline Hollywood: "The films that were asked to be withdrawn by the 300 filmmakers are not anti-Palestinian films in any way, quite the opposite…"

It was also part of the lineup of the New York Jewish Film Festival, where it was screened on 23 January 2025.

It will also screen at the Woodstock Film Festival on 17 October 2025.

== Reception ==
Jordan Mintzer of The Hollywood Reporter praised the film as "thoughtful and quietly powerful." He praised Rosenberg's approach for respecting "the victims instead of exploiting their memories." Likewise, Ilaria Bellantoni of Italy's weekly news magazine Panorama described the film as "achingly beautiful."

Jonathan Romney of Screen Daily gave the film a mixed review: "Rosenberg is to be lauded for approaching this material with emotional restraint. But the film’s gentle drift and its tendency to art cinema lyricism, delicate music included, mutes its effect considerably, even risks aestheticising the trauma."

In November 2025, the film was praised by Dr. Ohad Landesman from the School of Film and Television at Tel Aviv University, telling Haaretz: "And in 'On Dogs and People' by Dani Rosenberg, the attempt of hybridization between fiction and documentation gives expression to the almost impossible task of representing the events in a language that we know. It's somewhat reminiscent of Italian neorealism, which arose immediately after the war and offered a new language. At the time it was part of a constraint, because the studios were bombed in the war and there was no infrastructure. And now, in these two films ['Nova' documentary], a language that is incomprehensible was created, a language that was born out of a crisis."
