= Arbel Yehoud =

Israeli hostage taken in 2023

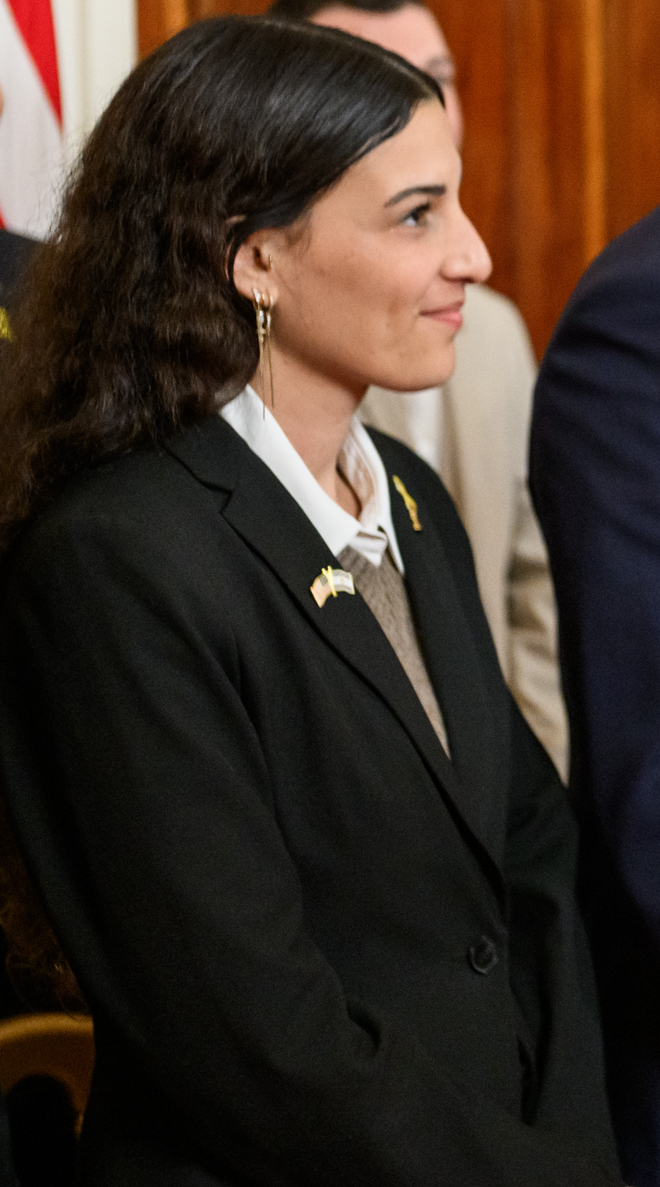
- Yehoud at the White House in 2025
- Born: 21 June 1995 (age 31); Israel
- Known for: Hostage in Gaza (2023–2025)
- Partner: Ariel Cunio

Arbel Yehoud (or Yehud; Hebrew: ארבל יהוד; born 21 June 1995) is an Israeli woman who was abducted from Nir Oz during the October 7 attacks. Yehoud was held in captivity for 482 days by Palestinian Islamic Jihad until she was released as part of the January 2025 Gaza war ceasefire. She was the last living female Israeli hostage to be freed.

Under the terms of the ceasefire, Yehoud was supposed to be released by 25 January 2025. When she was not, Israel delayed allowing Palestinians to return to the north of Gaza through the Netzarim Corridor. This event was described as the first major "crisis" of the ceasefire and was resolved after international mediators guaranteed that Yehoud would be freed on 30 January 2025. Her subsequent release was described as "chaotic" by both CNN and AP News, as Yehoud was led by Palestinian militants through crowds of thousands in Khan Younis before being handed over to the Red Cross.

After her release, Yehoud became an advocate for the return of the remaining hostages, including her partner, Ariel Cunio. Cunio was later released as part of the Gaza Peace Plan.

== Early life ==
Arbel Yehoud was born on 21 June 1995, to Yael Yehoud and Yechiel Yehoud. She had two older brothers, Dolev and Neta, and was a third-generation resident of Kibbutz Nir Oz, with her grandparents being among its founders. Yehoud was a professional dancer for many years. She originally worked in her kibbutz's education system before she began working as a guide at GrooveTech. Yehoud began dating Ariel Cunio five years before their abduction, and the pair had returned from a vacation to South America shortly before 7 October 2023. The couple had gotten engaged shortly before 7 October 2023.

== Captivity ==
=== Abduction ===
On 7 October 2023, Yehoud was abducted from her home in Kibbutz Nir Oz alongside her fiancé, Ariel Cunio. That morning, Yehoud had texted her mother that she was in the safe room with Cunio. Her last contact with her family was around 9 a.m., when she texted a cousin that someone had shot at their window. The couple's recently adopted dog, Murph, was shot dead, and the couple was beaten by their captors. Yehoud and Cunio were separated three hours after entering Gaza.

Separate from their abduction, Cunio's brother, David Cunio, sister-in-law, Sharon Cunio, and two nieces, Emma and Yuli Cunio, were also taken hostage by Hamas. Yehoud's brother, Dolev Yehoud, was also initially believed to have been taken hostage, until his remains were identified in June 2024.

In May 2025, ASharq Al-Aswat reported that a commander involved in abducting Yehoud was killed in an IDF operation in Khan Younis.

=== Conditions ===
Yehoud was held in captivity by Palestinian Islamic Jihad. She was held alone and barefoot for the entirety of her captivity. Throughout her captivity, she was held in several different homes and was reported to have been held in difficult conditions, fed little food, and left suffering from malnutrition. In the first months of Yehoud's captivity, she and Cunio were able to communicate through intermediaries, but this correspondence was terminated after several months. Yehoud learned Arabic early on in her captivity and did not believe her captors when they told her about the internal disagreements in Israel over a hostage deal. Yehoud expected to be released during the 2023 Gaza war ceasefire but felt "abandoned" after she remained in captivity. Yehoud was among the hostages who were fast-tracked for German citizenship in order to help assist in their release. She officially received her German passport after her release from captivity.

During the 2024 Rafah hostage raid, Yehoud, who was located in an area close to the raid, was held at gunpoint by her captors. Yehoud reported that when relatives of her captors were wounded by the Israeli military, she was severely beaten and kept isolated for several days. While in captivity, she learned that her brother, Dolev, had been killed on 7 October.

Towards the end of Yehoud's captivity, she became aware of the magnitude of the hostage crisis after her captors permitted her to watch Al Jazeera. In a February 2026 interview, Yehoud said she was sexually abused and had attempted suicide on three occasions throughout her captivity.

=== Release ===
Under the terms of the January 2025 Gaza war ceasefire, Yehoud was expected to be released on either 19 or 25 January. After the release of Emily Damari, Romi Gonen, and Doron Steinbrecher on 19 January, Israel told Hamas of its expectation for Yehoud to be among the four hostages released on 25 January. However, after Yehoud was not among the four hostages (Naama Levy, Liri Albag, Daniella Gilboa, and Karina Ariev) released on 25 January, Israel delayed opening the Netzarim Corridor, which would have enabled hundreds of thousands of Palestinians to return to northern Gaza. This event was considered by multiple sources to be the first significant 'crisis' or 'complication' of the ceasefire. After mediation from the United States, Qatar, and Egypt, a deal was reached for Yehoud, Agam Berger, and a third hostage to be released on 30 January, and Israel allowed Palestinians in Gaza to return north.

On 27 January, the Al-Quds Brigades released a video of Yehoud in captivity. In the video, which was determined by the New York Times to have been filmed on 25 January, Yehoud told her family, "I hope to return to you soon, like the girls who have been released." This video was the first footage of Yehoud since her abduction. A second video of Yehoud was released on 30 January, showing her reuniting with fellow Nir Oz resident Gadi Moses, who was also scheduled to be released later that day. Moses was the first Israeli that Yehoud had encountered since being separated from Cunio.

On 30 January 2025, Yehoud was released in Khan Younis alongside hostages Gadi Moses, Surasak Lamnau, Sathian Suwannakham, Pongsak Tanna, Bannawat Saethao, and Watchara Sriaoun. She had been held in captivity for 482 days. Yehoud was the last living female hostage released from Gaza as the other remaining living female hostage, Agam Berger, had been released earlier in the day. Their release, which CNN and AP News described as "chaotic", took place at the ruins of the house of former Hamas leader Yahya Sinwar, and the hostages were led through a crowd of thousands before being transferred to the Red Cross. As a result, Israel delayed the release of 110 Palestinian detainees until guarantees were made that such a release ceremony would not be held again.

== Post-release activities ==
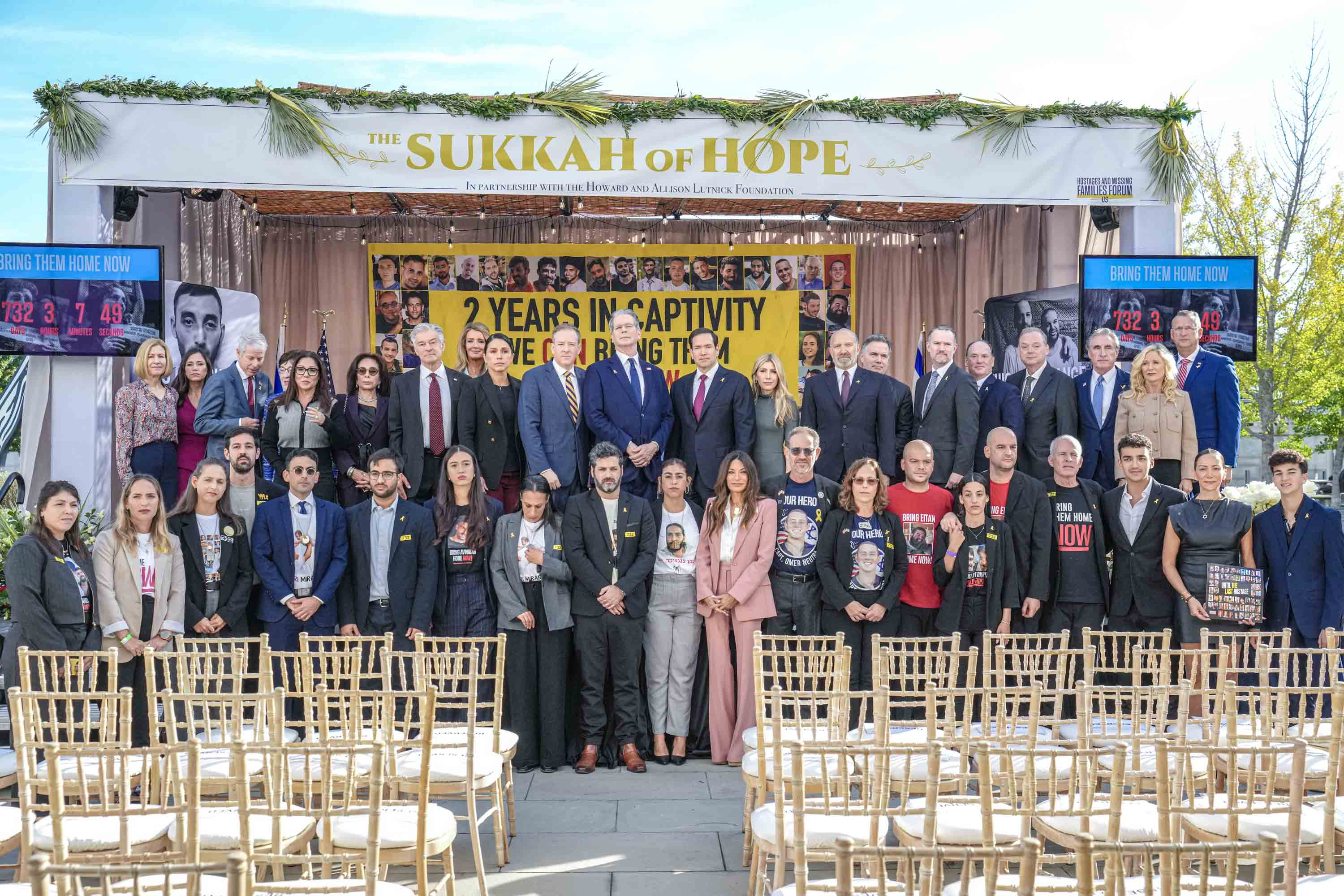
Yehoud attending a vigil in Washington, D.C. on the 2nd anniversary of 7 October.

Upon her release, Yehoud was taken to Sheba Hospital in Ramat Gan. Less than a week after her release, she was discharged from the hospital and moved into Nir Oz's temporary community in Kiryat Gat. Yehoud and Cunio's former home in Nir Oz was demolished in January 2026.

Yehoud made multiple public appearances following her release. In May 2025, she addressed the Knesset, encouraging members of the government to end the war. She also spoke at multiple Israeli hostage deal protests at Hostages Square, advocating for a direct deal to release the hostages rather than relying on military pressure. On the second anniversary of the 7 October attacks, Yehoud gave a speech at the Kennedy Center, calling for world leaders to bring home the remaining hostages. For her advocacy, Yehoud was named as one of the 18 recipients of Chochmat Nashim's Women of Iron Award in 2025.

Yehoud has criticized the Israeli government since her release. She declined to attend Israeli Prime Minister Benjamin Netanyahu's visit to Kibbutz Nir Oz and was among the 22 hostages who signed a letter pushing for a state commission of inquiry into the 7 October attacks. Along with other former hostages, she signed a letter calling for Gal Hirsch, the coordinator for hostage release efforts, to resign after Hirsch asserted that protests in favor of a hostage deal had aided Hamas.

Ariel Cunio was released on 13 October 2025, as part of the Gaza peace plan. Cunio and Yehoud, along with Cunio's brother David Cunio, sister-in-law, Sharon Cunio, and nieces Emma and Yuli Cunio, were among the 26 former hostages who met with President Donald Trump at the White House in November 2025. Yehoud and Cunio raised ₪4,000,000 (about $1.3 million) through a crowdfunding campaign within 24 hours of their Channel 12 interview airing, while a previous fundraising campaign for Yehoud had raised ₪700,000 towards her rehabilitation.

== See also ==
- List of Gaza war hostages
