= Daniel Lifshitz =

Israeli former footballer (born 1988)

Daniel Lifshitz דניאל ליפשיץ
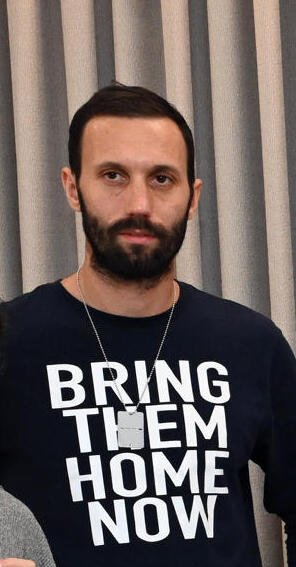
- Daniel Lifshitz in 2023

Personal information
- Full name: Daniel Lifshitz
- Date of birth: 24 April 1988 (age 38)
- Place of birth: Gothenburg, Sweden
- Height: 1.86 m (6 ft 1 in)
- Position: Goalkeeper

Youth career
- 2004–2007: Maccabi Haifa

Senior career*
Years	Team	Apps	(Gls)
2007–2010	Maccabi Netanya	17	(0)
2010–2011	Maccabi Ahi Nazareth	1	(0)
2011–2012	Hapoel Be'er Sheva	3	(0)
2012	Maccabi Umm al-Fahm	15	(0)
2013	Hapoel Ashkelon	17	(0)
2013–2014	Hakoah Amidar Ramat Gan	19	(0)
2014	Maccabi Herzliya	12	(0)
2014–2016	Hapoel Ra'anana	26	(0)
2015–2016	→ Maccabi Tel Aviv (loan)	1	(0)
2016–2017	Maccabi Tel Aviv	1	(0)

International career
2008–2009	Israel U21	1	(0)
- * Club domestic league appearances and goals as of 14 September 2015

Daniel Lifshitz (Hebrew: דניאל ליפשיץ; born 24 April 1988) is an Israeli former footballer.

== Biography ==
Lifshitz was born in Gothenburg, Sweden. His father was from kibbutz Nir Oz. His mother was a Swedish woman who had met his father in Israel. He moved to Israel at age 7 with his family, and grew up on Nir Oz. On 7 October 2023, his grandparents, Oded and Yocheved, were kidnapped to the Gaza Strip by Hamas during the October 7 attacks. On 23 October 2023, his grandmother, 85-year-old Yocheved Lifschitz, was released from Hamas captivity after 17 days. On 20 February 2025, the body of his grandfather Oded was returned to Israel after 503 days.

== Playing career ==
On 17 June 2008, Lifshitz signed a four-year contract with Maccabi Netanya. In the summer of 2010 he left Netanya and signed a contract with Maccabi Ahi Nazareth for one season. Later he moved to play for Hapoel Beer Sheva, Maccabi Umm al-Fahm, Hapoel Ashkelon, Hakoah Amidar Ramat Gan and most recently he signed with Maccabi Herzliya in Liga Leumit. On 20 May 2018 Lifshitz retired from football.
