= Gal Greenspan =

Israeli film producer

- גל גרינשפן
- Born: 20 April 1981 (age 45); Israel
- Occupation: Film producer

Gal Greenspan (Hebrew: גל גרינשפן: born 20 April 1981) is a film and television producer based in Australia, working across feature films, documentaries, and series. He is currently Co-Managing Director of MOFA, where he leads long-form development and production across Australia and New Zealand.

Since relocating to Australia in 2017, Greenspan has produced and executive produced a slate of Australian and New Zealand productions.

Before moving to Australia, Greenspan co-founded of Green Productions, an independent film and commercial production company based in Tel Aviv. He has produced feature films that have screened at international film festivals, including the Berlin International Film Festival, Cannes Film Festival, Sundance Film Festival, and the Jerusalem Film Festival. His producing credits at the company include Youth, A Quiet Heart, Summer Vacation, Scaffolding, and Menashe.

== Early life and education ==
Greenspan was born and raised in 1981 in Tel Aviv, Israel. He is the son of a publicist mother. He served in the IDF Film Unit, where he gained professional experience in military filmmaking and media production. After completing his military service, he studied film production at the Sam Spiegel Film and Television School, enrolling in the school's first cycle of the initiative production track.

== Career ==
Greenspan became involved in film production during his studies. Shortly after graduating in 2008, he founded the production company Green Productions, initially working with emerging filmmakers whose graduation films he had produced, with the intention of developing their work into feature-length projects. He served as a second assistant director on the Israeli feature film Lebanon, directed by Samuel Maoz, and later produced the Tel Aviv International Student Film Festival.

In 2011, Greenspan presented the project Youth, directed by Tom Shoval, at the Sofia International Film Festival, where it won Best Pitch and Best Project at the Sofia Meetings co-production forum. Prior to this, Youth had participated in major international industry platforms, including the Berlin Talent Project Market, the Thessaloniki Crossroads Co-production Forum, and the Hong Kong Film Financing Forum. The film later premiered at the Berlin International Film Festival in 2013.

In 2015, Greenspan produced the horror-comedy feature film Classified Abnormal, directed by Boaz Armoni. The film was shot over approximately 12 days on a low budget, is set on a fictional Israeli military base, and was released theatrically in Tel Aviv during a period of heightened security tension in Israel. In the same year, Greenspan was attached as producer to Shake Your Cares Away, the second feature film by director Tom Shoval. Shake Your Cares Away was developed under the Rolex Mentors and Protégés Arts Initiative, with director Alejandro González Iñárritu serving as mentor to Shoval.

In 2016, Greenspan produced the feature film A Quiet Heart, directed by Eitan Anner. The film won the Grand Prix for Best Film at the Tallinn Black Nights Film Festival, with the prize shared between Anner and Greenspan. Lead actress Ania Bukstein received the festival's Best Actress Award for her performance.

In 2017, Greenspan expanded his international production activity through Green Productions, focusing on international co-productions amid the Israeli industry's reliance on overseas partnerships. That year, he relocated to Melbourne, Australia, with the aim of developing co-productions between Israel and Australia. At the Jerusalem Film Festival, Greenspan was represented with two films in the program: Scaffolding, which won the festival's top prize, and Menashe, which focuses on an ultra-Orthodox man living in a Hasidic community in New York State. He also was named among Israel's emerging film producers in a profile published by Screen International during the Jerusalem Film Festival's Industry Days.

In 2019, Greenspan co-founded Sweetshop & Green, an Australia and New Zealand-based film and television production company formed as a joint venture between Sweetshop and Green Productions. The company was established to develop and produce feature films and television dramas for the international market. Greenspan served as joint managing director alongside Sweetshop founding partner Sharlene George.

In 2022, Greenspan produced Cinema Sabaya, which won Best Picture at the Ophir Awards and was selected as Israel's official submission for the Academy Award for Best International Feature Film.

In 2025, Greenspan became co-managing director of MOFA following the merger of Sweetshop & Green with the company, leading its long-form film, television, and documentary slate while continuing to develop international co-productions.

== Selected works ==
- Youth (Feature Film) – Premiered at the Berlin International Film Festival and was developed through major international co-production forums.
- A Quiet Heart (Feature Film) – Winner of the Grand Prix at the Tallinn Black Nights Film Festival.
- Scalffolding (Feature Film) – Premiered at Cannes in the ACID section and won Best Film at the Jerusalem Film Festival.
- Menashe (Feature Film) – Premiered at Sundance and Berlinale. A critically acclaimed independent feature set within an ultra-Orthodox community in New York.
- Cinema Sabaya (Feature Film) – Winner of Best Picture at the Ophir Awards and Israel’s official submission for the Academy Awards for Best International Feature Film.
- Where is Anne Frank? (Animated Feature Film) – An Australian-involved international animated feature directed by Ari Folman. It premiered at the Cannes Film Festival in 2021 and went on to receive global theatrical release.
- Moja Vesna (Feature Film) – An Australian-produced feature film that premiered at the Berlin International Film Festival in 2022.
- The Defenders (Feature Documentary) – Released on Amazon Prime in 2023, this investigative documentary examines international law, human rights, and conflict.
- Prisoner X (Feature Documentary) – An Israeli-Australian co-production that premiered on ABC in 2024. The film explores one of Israel’s most secretive political scandals.
- Second to None (Documentary Series) – A sports documentary series released internationally across Eurosport, Max, and Discovery.
- Red Alert (Television Miniseries) – A four-part premium drama series produced in partnership with Lawrence Bender and Keshet. Depicting real-life events surrounding the October 7, 2023 attacks in Israel, the series interweaves multiple civilian perspectives into a powerful dramatic narrative.
- Mārama (Feature Film) – Premiered at the Toronto International Film Festival. A New Zealand Māori gothic thriller written and directed by Taratoa “Toa” Stappard, Mārama blends gothic horror with themes of colonisation, whakapapa, and spiritual reclamation.
- Tell Me Everything (Feature Film) – Premiered at Sundance. Tell Me Everything is a drama written and directed by Moshe Rosenthal. The film follows Boaz, a 12-year-old boy growing up during the HIV pandemic, who discovers that his father, Meir, is involved in a relationship with another man.
