= Kidnapping of Hanna Katzir =

Israeli hostage (1948–2024)

Hanna Katzir
- חנה קציר
- Born: 6 December 1946
- Died: 24 December 2024 (aged 78)
- Occupation: Kindergarten teacher
- Known for: Gaza war hostage crisis
- Children: 3

Hanna Katzir (Hebrew: חנה קציר; 6 December 1946 – 24 December 2024) was an Israeli kindergarten teacher who was abducted during the Nir Oz attack led by Hamas on 7 October 2023. She was released after 49 days in captivity. Katzir died on 24 December 2024, due to health complications resulting from her captivity.

== Biography ==
Katzir worked as a caretaker and a kindergarten teacher at Nir Oz, a kibbutz in northwestern Negev. She was involved in the kibbutz community alongside her husband, Avraham Katzir. They had three children.

== Captivity ==
On 7 October 2023, she was abducted by Hamas during the Nir Oz attack. Her husband was murdered during the assault, and her son Elad was also abducted. Her son was murdered in captivity and his body was returned to Israel by the IDF.

During her captivity in the Gaza Strip, Katzir, who required assistance to walk, was seen in a wheelchair. She was initially held in isolation before being moved to join other captives. The Palestinian Islamic Jihad (PIJ) claimed on its Telegram channel that Katzir had died, stating it had been willing to release her but blamed delays by the opposing side.

Katzir was released on 24 November 2023, as part of a truce. Following her release, her health declined due to the conditions she endured during her captivity, which included insufficient medical care, starvation and inadequate living conditions.

== Death and legacy ==
Katzir died on 24 December 2024 from Takotsubo cardiomyopathy caused by the massacre and the complications stemming from her captivity. She was 78. Her funeral was held in Nir Oz. Her case highlighted the physical and psychological impacts experienced by individuals held hostage by Hamas.

Israeli prime minister Benjamin Netanyahu issued a statement after her death, expressing condolences and acknowledging the impact of her captivity. He remarked, "We succeeded in bringing Hannah back home after she was cruelly abducted by Hamas on 7 October, but her body and soul carried the scars of the horrors until her final day".

The National Insurance Institute of Israel recognized Katzir as a victim of hostilities. Israeli minister of labor Yoav Ben-Tzur noted her resilience during her captivity by Hamas and acknowledged the loss of her husband in the attack and her son Elad, who was killed in captivity.

== See also ==
- List of Gaza war hostages
