= Yosef Ohana =

Israeli taken hostage by Hamas

Yosef Chaim Ohana
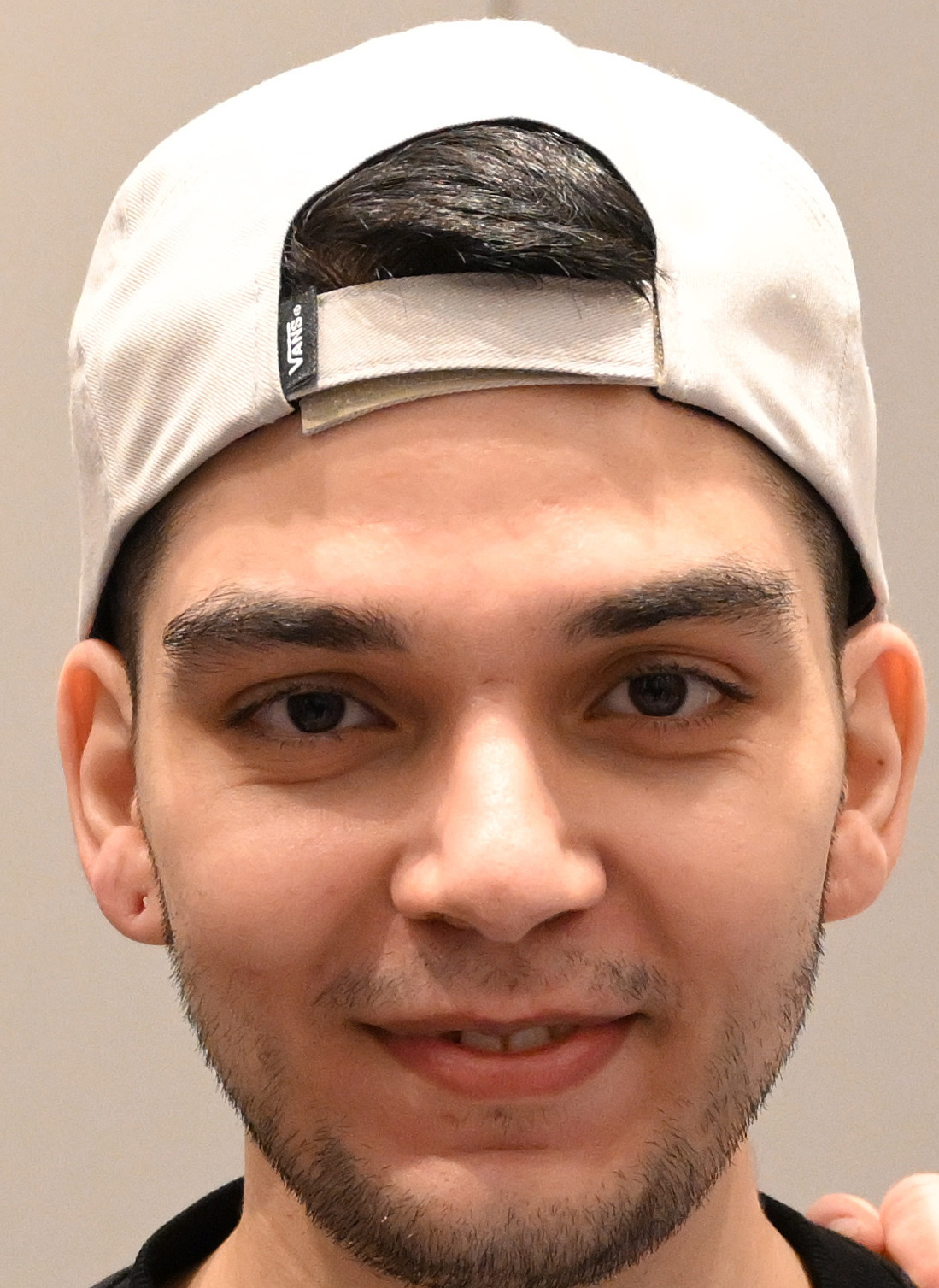
- Yosef Chaim Ohana following his release
- Born: Kiryat Malachi
- Known for: His abduction to Gaza during the Nova festival massacre and his public activity after release

Yosef Chaim Ohana (Hebrew: יוסף חיים אוחנה; born 10 September 2000) is a former Givati Brigade commander, who was abducted by Hamas on October 7, 2023 while working as a bartender at the Nova music festival after helping evacuate wounded victims. He was held for 738 days before being released on October 13, 2025.

== Early life ==
Yosef Chaim Ohana was born to Avi and Miri Ohana. He was raised in Kiryat Malachi, where he attended the Nachlat Har Chabad Talmud Torah. Prior to his abduction, Ohana served as a commander in the Givati Brigade of the Israel Defense Forces.

== Kidnapping ==
On October 6 and 7, 2023, Ohana was working as a bartender at the Nova music festival near Re'im. Following the onset of the October 7 massacre, orchestrated by Palestinian militant factions led by Hamas, Ohana, then 23 years old, was seen assisting in the evacuation of wounded individuals to medical personnel and ambulances. He was subsequently abducted and taken into the Gaza Strip. For several weeks following the attack, his status remained officially classified as "missing" until his family received confirmation of his abduction.

== Captivity ==
During his 738 days in captivity, Ohana utilized strategic deception and psychological tactics to ensure his survival. Despite his background as an IDF commander, he successfully convinced his captors that he had only served briefly in a junior, non-combat role before being discharged. This military history remained classified and was hidden from both his captors and the general public until after his return to Israel.

Ohana achieved fluency in Arabic during his two years in imprisonment. According to his later testimony, his command of the language allowed him to negotiate directly with his captors; he claimed he successfully persuaded them to spare his life on dozens of occasions by arguing that his death would decrease the number of Palestinian prisoners released in future exchanges.

Despite these efforts, Ohana reported being subjected to torture, deliberate starvation, and physical and psychological abuse. According to Ohana, he was held for extended periods in lightless tunnels and subjected to "lotteries," in which captors forced hostages to choose which among them would be injured or killed. In interviews with Israeli Channel 12 following his release, Ohana said he was traumatized by his time in captivity, including the terror induced by the sudden appearance of flashlights, an experience hostages referred to as “the lamps are coming”, and said he has by affected psychologically by the toll of living in constant darkness.

The first documented sign of life was received in March 2025, via a propaganda video in which he appeared alongside fellow hostage Elkana Bohbot.

== Efforts to release ==
The campaign to secure Ohana's freedom, alongside the remaining hostages, spanned two years of intensive diplomatic negotiations coordinated by the United States, Qatar, and Egypt, ultimately culminating in a comprehensive ceasefire agreement in late 2025.

To protect his safety, specific details regarding his background as a military commander were strictly suppressed by the Israel Defense Forces and the Prime Minister’s Office Hostages and Missing Authority. This strategic classification was maintained to prevent his captors from increasing his "value" as a bargaining chip or subjecting him to retaliatory treatment.

In early 2025, Ohana’s case gained renewed global attention after he appeared in a Hamas-released propaganda video alongside fellow hostage Elkana Bohbot. In the footage, Ohana was seen pleading for a diplomatic resolution to the crisis.

== Release ==
Ohana was released on October 13, 2025, a date coinciding with the Jewish holiday of Hoshana Rabbah. He was among the final 20 living hostages returned as part of a phase-one agreement to end the war.

=== Post-release activities ===
Upon his arrival in Israel, he was treated at Sheba Medical Center for severe nutritional deficiencies and the physical toll of prolonged isolation. He was discharged on October 19, 2025, alongside fellow freed hostages Ariel and David Cunio, Gali and Ziv Berman, and Elkana Bohbot.

Upon leaving the hospital, Ohana entered a six-week rehabilitation program at the Kfar Hamaccabiah complex in Ramat Gan. On November 30, 2025, he made his final return to his hometown of Kiryat Malachi, where he was greeted by thousands of residents in a public celebration featuring shofar blasts and Israeli flags.

Since his release, Ohana has provided testimony regarding the psychological and physical conditions of his captivity. He has also become a vocal advocate for the return of the remains of those still held in Gaza, specifically mentioning Staff Sgt. Ran Gvili. Describing the transition to freedom as a gradual internal shift, Ohana stated, "The release isn't complete, it's still happening... I need to learn to be free".

== See also ==
- List of Gaza war hostages
- Kidnapping of Rom Braslavski
- Kidnapping of Elkana Bohbot
- Kidnapping of Evyatar David
- Kidnapping of Noa Argamani
- Bar Kupershtein
- Omer Shem Tov
- Ziv Berman
