= A Letter to David =

2025 Israeli documentary film

- International promotional poster
- Hebrew: מכתב לדוד
- Directed by: Tom Shoval
- Written by: Tom Shoval
- Produced by: Roy Bareket; Maya Fischer; Alona Refua; Nancy Spielberg
- Starring: David Cunio
- Cinematography: Yaniv Linton
- Edited by: Maya Kenig; Margarita Linton
- Music by: Asher Goldschmidt
- Production companies: Green Productions; Playmount Productions; Slutzky Communication
- Distributed by: Go2Films (Israel)
- Release dates: 14 February 2025 (Berlinale); 27 March 2025 (Israel)
- Running time: 74 minutes
- Countries: Israel; United States
- Language: Hebrew

A Letter to David (Hebrew: מכתב לדוד, translit. Michtav Le'David) is a 2025 documentary film written and directed by Tom Shoval. It is a cinematic letter to David Cunio, who had previously starred in Shoval's Youth (2013), and who was abducted by Hamas during the October 7 attacks in 2023 from Nir Oz, and held hostage in Gaza.

The film had its world premiere at the Berlinale Special section of the 75th Berlin International Film Festival on 14 February 2025. It was theatrically released in Israel on 27 March by Go2Films. At the 36th Ophir Awards, it won the Best Documentary.

== Synopsis ==
The documentary unfolds as a cinematic letter from director Tom Shoval to David Cunio, an Israeli man abducted from Nir Oz during the October 7, 2023 attacks and still held in Gaza. Shoval revisits his earlier feature film Youth (2013), in which Cunio starred as a teenager involved in a fictional kidnapping, and juxtaposes that narrative with Cunio's real‑life fate. Drawing on behind‑the‑scenes footage, audition tapes, and personal reflections, the film explores the unsettling overlap between cinema and reality. Through this framework, Shoval examines themes of memory, trauma, and the role of filmmaking in confronting war and loss.

Cunio was released by Hamas two years later, on 13 October 2025, nearly 6 months after the documentary official release in Israel. Following the news, Shoval announced that he plans to give the film a new ending.

== Production ==
Nancy Spielberg, sister of Steven Spielberg is among the producers of the film. Nancy had been visiting Israel during the October 7 attacks and was deeply affected and wanted to make a film. Through her friend Jake Paltrow, she was introduced to Shoval.

== Release ==
The documentary had its world premiere on 7 October 2025 at the 75th Berlin International Film Festival, where it was screened in the Berlinale Special section.

Following its Berlin debut, the film was selected for multiple international festivals, including the Karlovy Vary International Film Festival in the Czech Republic, Doc Edge in New Zealand, and the Mar del Plata International Film Festival in Argentina. It also screened at Jewish film festivals in Berlin, San Francisco, Toronto, and London.

== Reception ==
Jordan Mintzer of The Hollywood Reporter praised the film: "The haunting images of the Cunio brothers in Youth leave us to ponder David's fate not only as an actor in a movie, but in the greater global tragedy he's now a part of."

Dr Pablo Utin, a film scholar, gave the film 4.5 out of 5 stars in his Haaretz review, describing it as "a powerful cinematic mix of a personal letter, a philosophical essay, an activist film and a documentary."

In 2025, it won the Ophir Award for Best Full-length Documentary.
