= Kidnapping of Elkana Bohbot =

Israeli taken hostage by Hamas on October 7, 2023

Elkana Bohbot
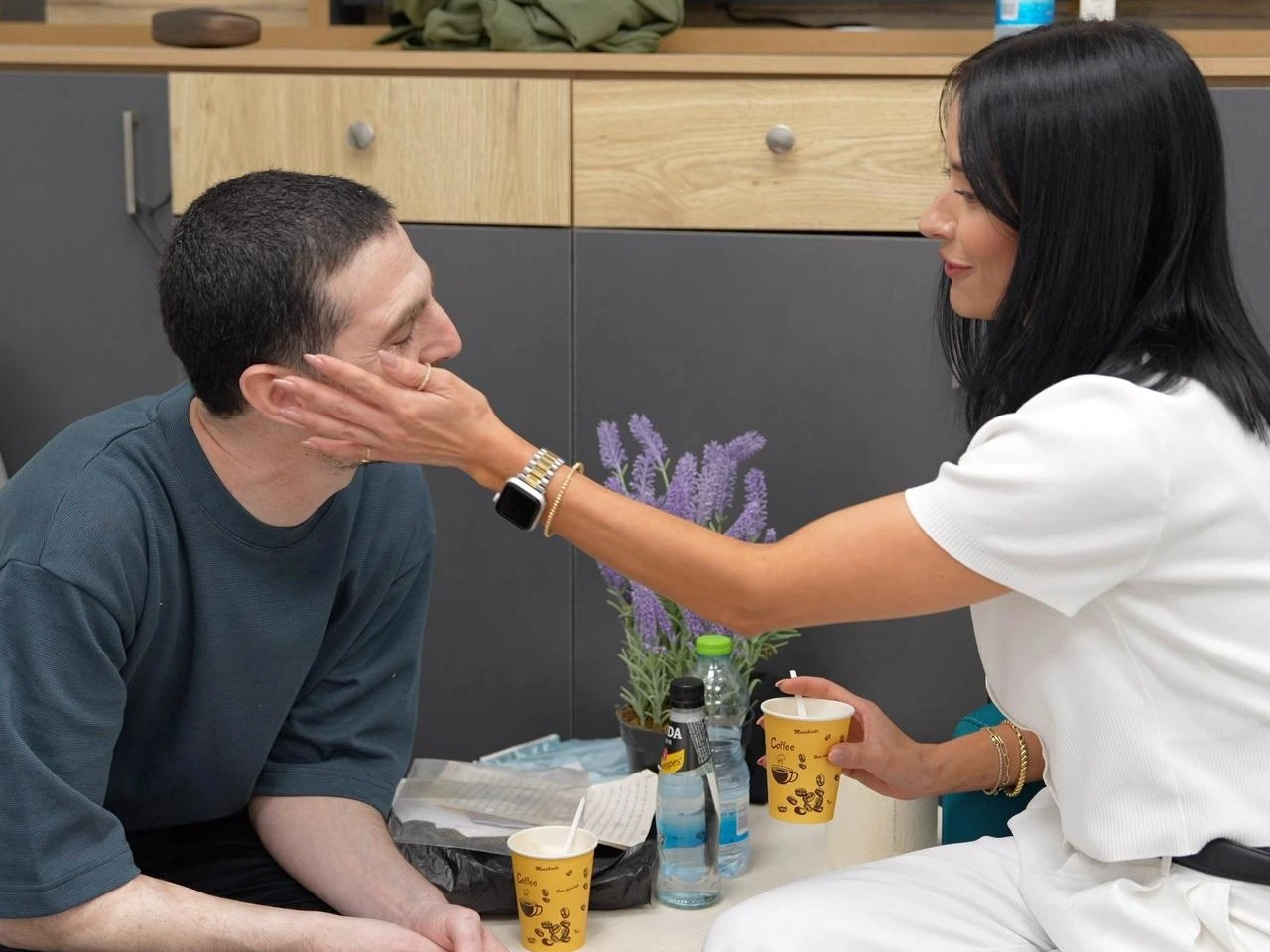
- Bohbot, left, after his release in October 2025
- Born: March 22, 1989 (age 37); Holon, Israel
- Known for: His abduction to Gaza during the Nova festival massacre
- Spouse: Rivka Bohbot

Elkana Bohbot (Hebrew: אלקנה בוחבוט; born March 22, 1989), is an Israeli man who was abducted by Hamas on October 7, 2023 at the Supernova music festival. He was released after 738 days in captivity.

== Background ==
Bohbot was born on March 22, 1989. He is an Israeli resident of Mevaseret Zion, a town near Jerusalem. Prior to his abduction by Hamas, he was employed by a production company specialising in the construction of stages for large-scale events. Bohbot was a logistics manager for the company responsible for producing the Nova Music Festival. In addition to his work in event production, Bohbot was preparing to open a gourmet ice cream shop in Tel Aviv. During his captivity, his family continued to pay rent on a market stall in Tel Aviv, intended for the business. Bohbot is married to Rebecca (Rivka) Gonzales, a Colombian citizen, and they have one son, Re’em.

== Kidnapping ==
On October 7, 2023, Bohbot called his family to inform them that he was helping wounded Nova Party attendees after gunfire erupted at the party. Bohbot's mother, Ruhama, told the Jewish News Syndicate that she was at home with her daughter-in-law, Rivka, and her grandson. After seeing alarming reports on television, Ruhama awoke Rivka and told her that "it looked like war had begun."

At 7:50 a.m., Bohbot received a call from his mother and told her he was helping others evacuate the festival. Rivka called him to warn him about armed terrorists in pickup trucks pretending to be soldiers. Bohbot promised to return home soon. At noon, a friend of Bohbot's called the family to tell them that Elkana had been kidnapped and then shared video proof.

A Hamas video posted online on October 7, 2023, showed Bohbot, bound and injured in the face, being held by the armed group. In this video, a bloodied Bohbot can be seen lying on the floor, alongside four other hostages abducted from the Nova festival: Evyatar David, Guy Gilboa-Dalal, Almog Meir Jan and Bar Kupershtein. A month after his kidnapping, Colombian President Gustavo Petro granted Bohbot Colombian nationality.

== Captivity ==
During his captivity, Hamas published multiple videos of Bohbot filmed under duress. In March 2025, Hamas released multiple videos of Bohbot, marking the first proof-of-life of Bohbot since October 7. In the video, Bohbot refers to himself as Prisoner Number 22 and begs to be released from captivity. In April, Bohbot was filmed holding a fake telephone conversation with his wife, Rivka, and their son, Re’em, as well as his mother and brother. In the staged video, Bohbot pleads with his family to help him get out of Gaza.

In May 2025, Hamas released another video featuring hostages Elkana Bohbot and Yosef-Chaim Ohana. In the video, Ohana is seen sitting beside a mattress where Bohbot lies under a blanket. In the video, Ohana refers to himself as “Prisoner Number 21" and Bohbot as "Prisoner Number 22." Throughout the broadcast, Ohana begs the audience for their release and warns that Bohbot has tried to harm himself in captivity. Bohbot later stated that this claim was false and that the scene was staged under coercion, alleging that his captors deliberately injured his hand in an attempt to simulate a suicide attempt for filming purposes.

Following the release of the May video, Bohbot's mother stated that the footage was deeply distressing and uncharacteristic of her son. Speaking to the Jewish News Syndicate, she said the videos left the family "broken" and described them as "another punch to the stomach," adding that they showed how much danger her son was in rather than offering reassurance.

During more than two years in captivity, Bohbot reportedly made a toy for his five-year-old son as a way to pass the time. Bohbot's family told Israeli media that he received little to no food in the months before his release and spent most of his captivity chained inside a tunnel, losing all sense of time and space. Bohbot later described the conditions of his detention as involving prolonged confinement in darkness, severe deprivation, and repeated physical abuse, alongside sustained psychological pressure directed at his family relationships.

Bohbot was held alongside Ohad Ben Ami, Yosef Ohana, Bar Kupershtein, Maxim Herkin, and Segev Kalfon. The captors reportedly monitored the hostages from a distance and provided minimal food, including rice with worms and moldy pita, and at times nothing at all. During the January 2025 Gaza war ceasefire, Hamas reportedly threatened to execute three of the six hostages and shoot the remaining three in the leg. When the hostages refused to choose who would die, the captors spent hours alternating threats, though none were ultimately carried out.

In an interview in 2026, Bohbot recounted how he was driven to survive by his unwillingness to allow his Hamas captors to see him lose hope and, most of all, by his "belief that I would see my son Re'em again, my wife and my family". He said that he would recite Jewish prayers on a daily basis and would make kiddush on Friday night and Saturday to mark Shabbat.

== Efforts to release ==
At the outset of the hostage crisis, Bohbot's family was advised to remain publicly quiet about his captivity. After Bohbot was designated for release in the second phase of the January 2025 Gaza war ceasefire, his wife became more publicly active in advocacy efforts to free the remaining hostages. In March 2025, Bohbot's nephew, Menashe Harush, told the Jewish News Syndicate that he had been living at Tel Aviv’s Hostage Square since October 8, 2023, to raise awareness of Bohbot's captivity.

Following the release of two Hamas videos of Bohbot in March 2025, his family issued a statement expressing acute anxiety over his condition, urging the Israeli public not to forget him and warning that repeated “signs of life” could become final ones if action was not taken.

In May 2025, after another video of Bohbot was released, his mother again spoke publicly, voicing concern over both her son’s deteriorating condition and the uncertainty surrounding how many of the remaining hostages in Gaza were still alive.

== Release ==
Bohbot was released from Hamas captivity on October 13, 2025. His wife described the moment as more emotional than her wedding day. In a post-release statement, Rivka Bohbot directly referenced the Israeli government and instead thanked the Israeli public, the Hostages Forum, the IDF and security forces, U.S. President Donald Trump, envoy Steve Witkoff, and the U.S. government for their role in securing her husband’s return.

Rivka Bohbot later shared that her husband was adjusting well to life after captivity, noting with dark humor that he had forgotten some basic household routines, such as putting down the toilet seat. These updates provided rare moments of levity amid an otherwise harrowing account of more than two years in Hamas captivity.

Additional information regarding Bohbot’s treatment during captivity was later shared by his family. His mother stated that Bohbot had been held bound and blindfolded, with his hands and feet restrained. She also relayed Bohbot’s account of being transported in the back of a pickup truck alongside Evyatar David, Guy Gilboa-Dalal, and Bar Kupershtein, during which he was physically assaulted by his captors.

In October 2025, a video of Bohbot returning home was released to the public.

In interviews after his return to Israel Bohbot discussed "details of the torture and starvation that his captors inflicted on him", including being chained underground in Gaza for the majority of his time in Gaza and how he and fellow hostages were forced to make recordings in which they were trying to commit suicide.

== See also ==
- List of Gaza war hostages
