= Oded Lifshitz =

Israeli journalist and hostage (1940 – 2023)

- עודד ליפשיץ
- Born: 1940; Haifa, Mandatory Palestine
- Died: 26 October 2023 (aged 82–83); Gaza Strip, Palestine
- Occupation: Journalist
- Known for: Being kidnapped, held hostage, and ultimately killed during the Gaza war
- Spouse: Yocheved
- Children: 4
- Relatives: Daniel Lifshitz (grandson)

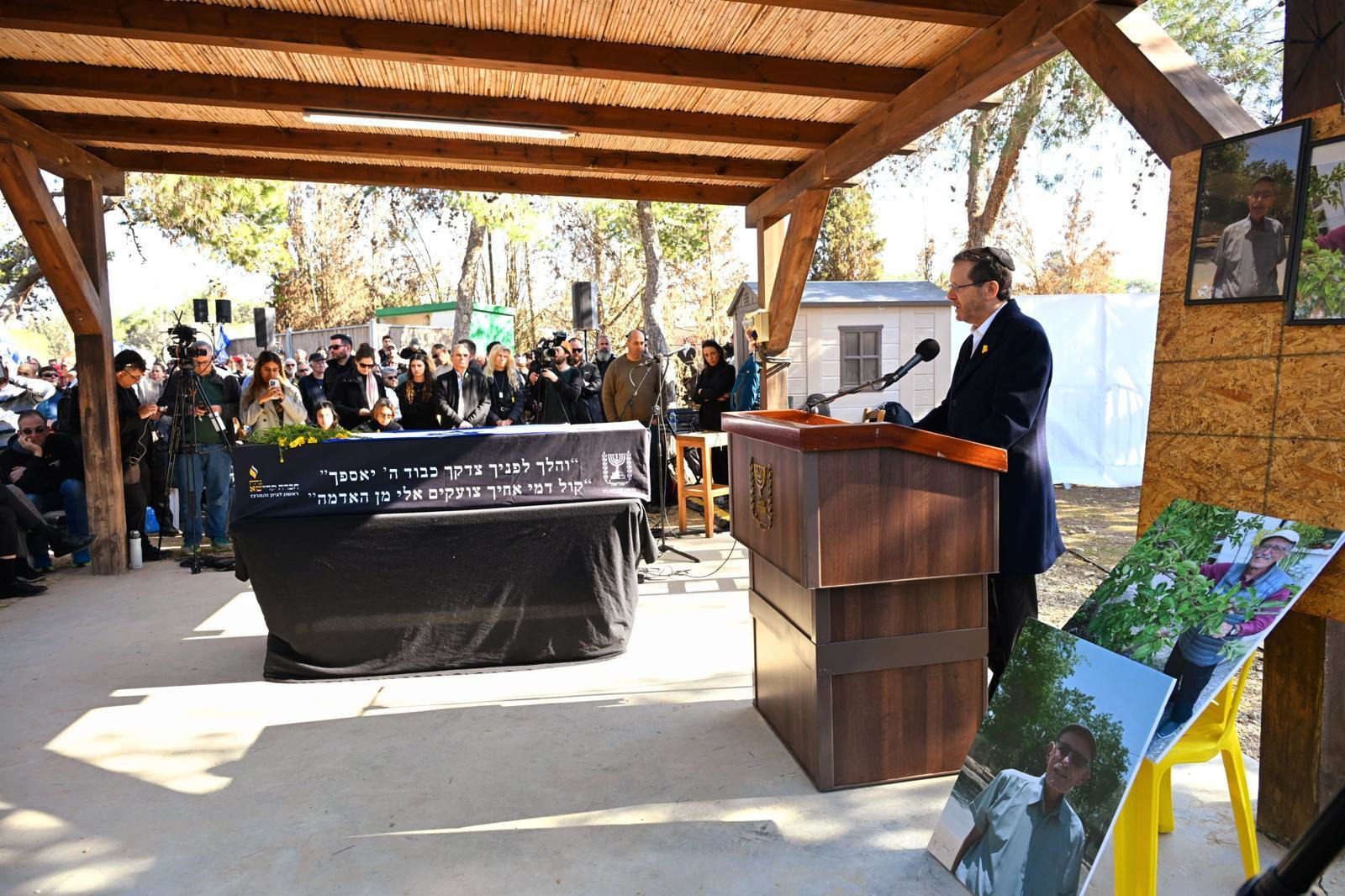
Isaac Herzog at Oded Lifshitz's funeral speaks next to his coffin, February 25, 2025

Oded Lifshitz (Hebrew: עודד ליפשיץ; 1940 – 26 October 2023) was an Israeli journalist and peace activist.

On 7 October 2023, Lifshitz was kidnapped in the Nir Oz massacre, part of the surprise attack on Israel. His captors, the Palestinian Islamic Jihad (PIJ), claimed that he was killed in the Israeli bombing of Gaza Strip in late 2023; however the Israel Defense Forces (IDF) claimed that he was killed in captivity by PIJ. Lifshitz's body was returned to Israel in February 2025, as part of the January 2025 Gaza war ceasefire.

== Biography ==
Lifshitz was born and raised in Haifa and graduated from the city's Hebrew Reali School in 1957. He participated in the Hashomer Hatzair youth movement. During his military service in the Israel Defense Forces, he served in the 50th Battalion of the Paratroopers Brigade. Lifshitz fought in the Six-Day War, War of Attrition, Yom Kippur War, and 1982 Lebanon War. He was one of the founding members of Kibbutz Nir Oz in 1955, serving as both coordinator and treasurer early on in the village's history. He defended Bedouin residents of Rafah when the IDF attempted to evacuate the Sinai Peninsula and was an on-the-grounds journalist who reported on the Sabra and Shatila massacre in Beirut in 1982.

From 1983 to 1995, he worked as a journalist at Al HaMishmar. He prepared articles for the radio program "A Light Hour on Economics", which broadcast on Army Radio.

Lifshitz was married to Yocheved, a photographer and former physical education teacher. They had four children, as well as grandchildren and a great-grandchild. One of their grandchildren, Daniel Lifshitz, is a former footballer who had played for the Israeli national under-21 team. He and his wife were peace activists who worked for Road to Recovery, an Israeli organization which helps aid Palestinian citizens in need of medical care in getting transportation to Israeli hospitals across the border.

== Abduction and captivity ==
On 7 October 2023, during the Nir Oz massacre, Lifshitz and his wife were kidnapped from their home to the Gaza Strip, by members of Hamas, and their home was set on fire. Hamas militants reportedly broke into the couple's safe room, and Oded was shot in the hand and Yocheved removed from a bed.

The couple was separated; Yocheved last saw Lifshitz lying at the edge of their property before she was put on the back of a motorcycle and taken into Gaza without her shoes or glasses, and was protected from angry Gazans by the Hamas militants. She was reportedly kept in a tunnel with other members of the kibbutz, where they were provided with mattresses and some food and reportedly met Hamas leader Yahya Sinwar. Sinwar reportedly assured the captives no harm would come to them and an exchange deal would soon be agreed on.

Yocheved was released after 17 days. Afterwards Yocheved recounted that she had been struck forcefully during her abduction and that she had gone "through hell," but she also said that the Hamas militants took care of sanitation and health as each hostage in her group received their own doctor and had supervised medicine disbursement.

Oded was reportedly held in an apartment in Khan Yunis for about twenty days, before his health deteriorated and his condition and whereabouts became unknown. A released female hostage from Nir Oz stated that she saw him alive and well during the time they were held together until the last day, when he felt unwell and was taken out of the room.

== Efforts to release ==
Their daughter, Sharone, spoke to news outlets stating that her parents were in danger, as they needed medication and that her mother used an oxygen mask when she slept. The National Union of Journalists called for their release. On 23 October, Yocheved was released.

In May 2024, Sharone Lifshitz criticized the apparent lack of action by the Israeli government, and stated her belief that the hostages had become pawns for the government. She believed her father could have been returned from Gaza if the Israeli government had acted earlier and with more focus on the hostages.

His grandson, Daniel, also campaigned for the release of his grandfather, and spoke out in January 2025 in support of the January 2025 Gaza war ceasefire and the recent return of the body of Oron Shaul but also the frustration at the apparent possibility of the deal happening earlier.

== Death ==
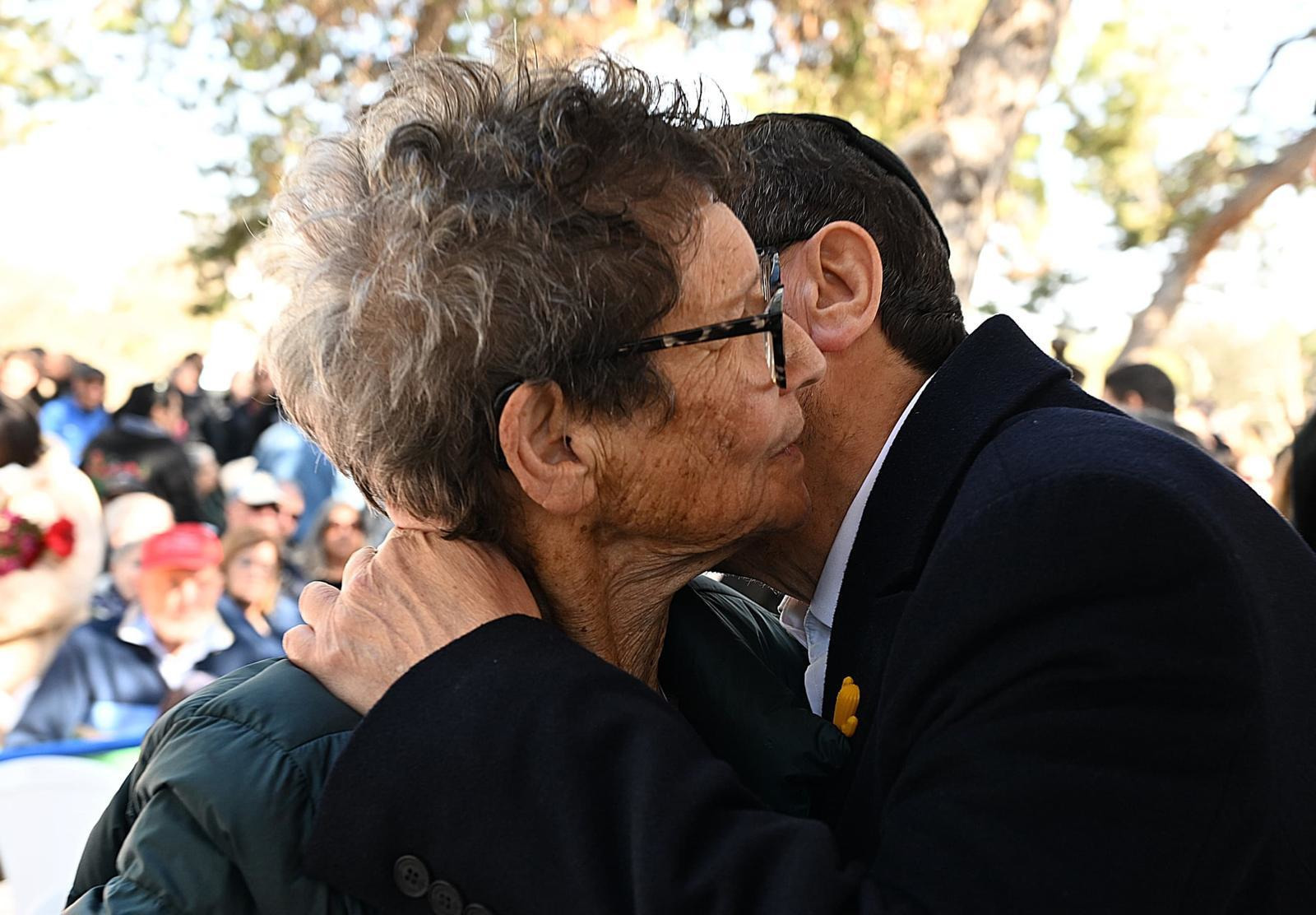
Isaac Herzog with Yocheved Lifshitz, the wife of Oded Lifshitz, at his funeral. February 25, 2025

On 19 February 2025, the Palestinian Islamic Jihad (PIJ) said that it would return the body of Oded Lifshitz on 20 February, as part of the ongoing cease fire. The group claimed that he was killed in an Israeli air strike. Israeli authorities later determined that he had died on 26 October 2023.

On 20 February 2025, Hamas handed over four coffins, reportedly containing the remains of Lifshitz and the Bibas family, but one coffin held an unknown Palestinian woman instead; the Bibas mother's remains were later handed over separately. Lifshitz's family confirmed that his body had been identified. The IDF stated that he was killed in captivity by the PIJ shortly after being kidnapped. Also the chief of the Abu Kabir Forensic Institute said that he was killed in captivity more than a year ago.

After the release of Lifshitz's body, his family released a statement saying that they had "hoped and prayed for a different outcome" during the 503 days that Lifshitz was held in Gaza, but now that his body had been released and his status confirmed, they could mourn him.

== See also ==
- Gaza war hostage crisis
