= Scaffolding (film) =

2017 film

- Film poster
- Directed by: Matan Yair
- Written by: Matan Yair
- Starring: Asher Lax
- Release dates: 20 May 2017 (Cannes); 17 July 2017 (Israel)
- Running time: 90 minutes
- Country: Israel
- Language: Hebrew

Scaffolding (Hebrew: פיגומים) is a 2017 Israeli drama film written and directed by Matan Yair, starring Asher Lax as a 17-year-old boy who, as usual, finds himself in trouble and must confront an abusive father (Yaakov Cohen) at home, while seeking a new role model at school (Ami Smolarchik). The screenplay is inspired by real-life events.

The film had its premiere at the Cannes and Toronto Film Festivals, and was screened at numerous festivals worldwide. It won the Best Film award at the Jerusalem Film Festival and the Best Actor award for Asher Lax. The film was nominated for eight Ophir Awards at the 28th Israeli Academy Awards, including Best Film, Best Director, Best Screenplay, Best Lead Actor, Editing, and Casting. Both Yaakov Cohen and Ami Smolarchik were nominated in the Best Supporting Actor category. Ultimately, the film won one Ophir Award – Best Supporting Actor, awarded to Smolarchik.

The film was produced by Green Productions and United King Films, with support from the Israeli Film Fund, Gesher Multicultural Film Fund, and the Polish Film Fund.

It became the second most-watched Israeli film of 2017, with over 150,000 viewers. It was also sold for distribution in six territories around the world, including France, the United States, Poland, and Spain.

== Plot ==
Asher Lax (Asher Lax), a 17-year-old high school student in a special education class, struggles with learning difficulties and behavioral problems. At the same time, he works with his father, Milo (Yaakov Cohen), in the family scaffolding business at construction sites. The father, an older man who is ill and facing surgery, treats his son harshly, even physically abusing him, while preparing him for the day when the family business will pass into his hands. Despite this, there are several moments when the father shows respect and trust in his son, even telling him that the business is no longer his, but Asher's.

When Rami Arad (Ami Smolarchik), a new literature teacher, arrives at the school and starts preparing the class for the matriculation exam, Asher finds a new role model in him and imagines a future that differs from the one his father has planned for him. However, an unexpected tragedy changes everything.

== Cast ==
- Asher Lax as Asher
- Ami Smolartchik as Rami
- Jacob Cohen as Milo
- Keren Berger as Shira
