= Nir Oz attack =

2023 massacre in Israel

- Part of the October 7 attacks
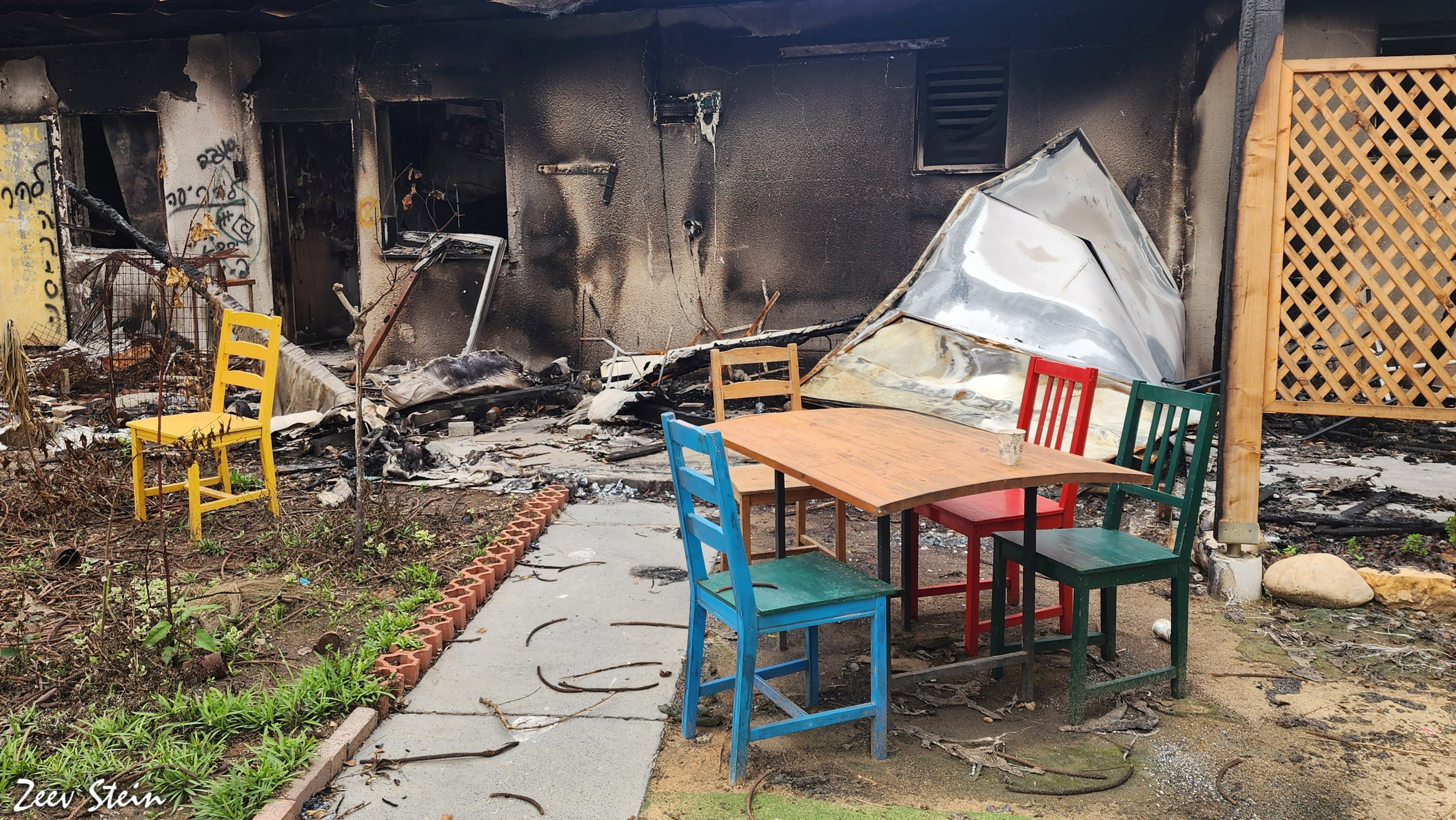
- Exterior of a home in the kibbutz in the aftermath of the 7 October attack

- Site of the attack in Israel
- Native name: הטבח בניר עוז
- Location: 31°18′37″N 34°24′8″E; Nir Oz, Southern District, Israel
- Date: 7 October 2023; 3 years ago
- Attack type: Mass shooting, mass murder, war crime
- Deaths: 47 dead
- Victim: 76 taken hostage
- Perpetrator: Hamas's Southern Khan Yunis Battalion

On 7 October 2023, as part of the surprise attack on Israel, Palestinian militants from the Gaza Strip, led by Hamas, invaded the Nir Oz kibbutz in southern Israel. They killed scores of kibbutz residents, burned homes, and abducted civilians. Over 500 Palestinian militants and civilian looters participated in the massacre. A total of 47 people were killed and 76 were taken hostage in the attack. Among them were peace activists, including later-released hostage Yocheved Lifshitz, who used to transport Gazans to hospitals in Israel for treatment.

== Background ==
Nir Oz (Hebrew: ניר עוז), is a kibbutz in southern Israel between Magen and Nirim and was founded on 1 October 1955 as the Nahal settlement. Due to its proximity to the Gaza Strip, the kibbutz has seen constant attacks from the Gaza Strip, and in a 2023 book it was reported that the kibbutz had a number of "self-contained bomb shelters, each weighing 67 tons". Nir Oz is a kibbutz located in the Gaza envelope, less than 7 kilometers from the border with the Gaza Strip. On 6 October, before the attack, Nir Oz had 427 residents.

== Attack ==
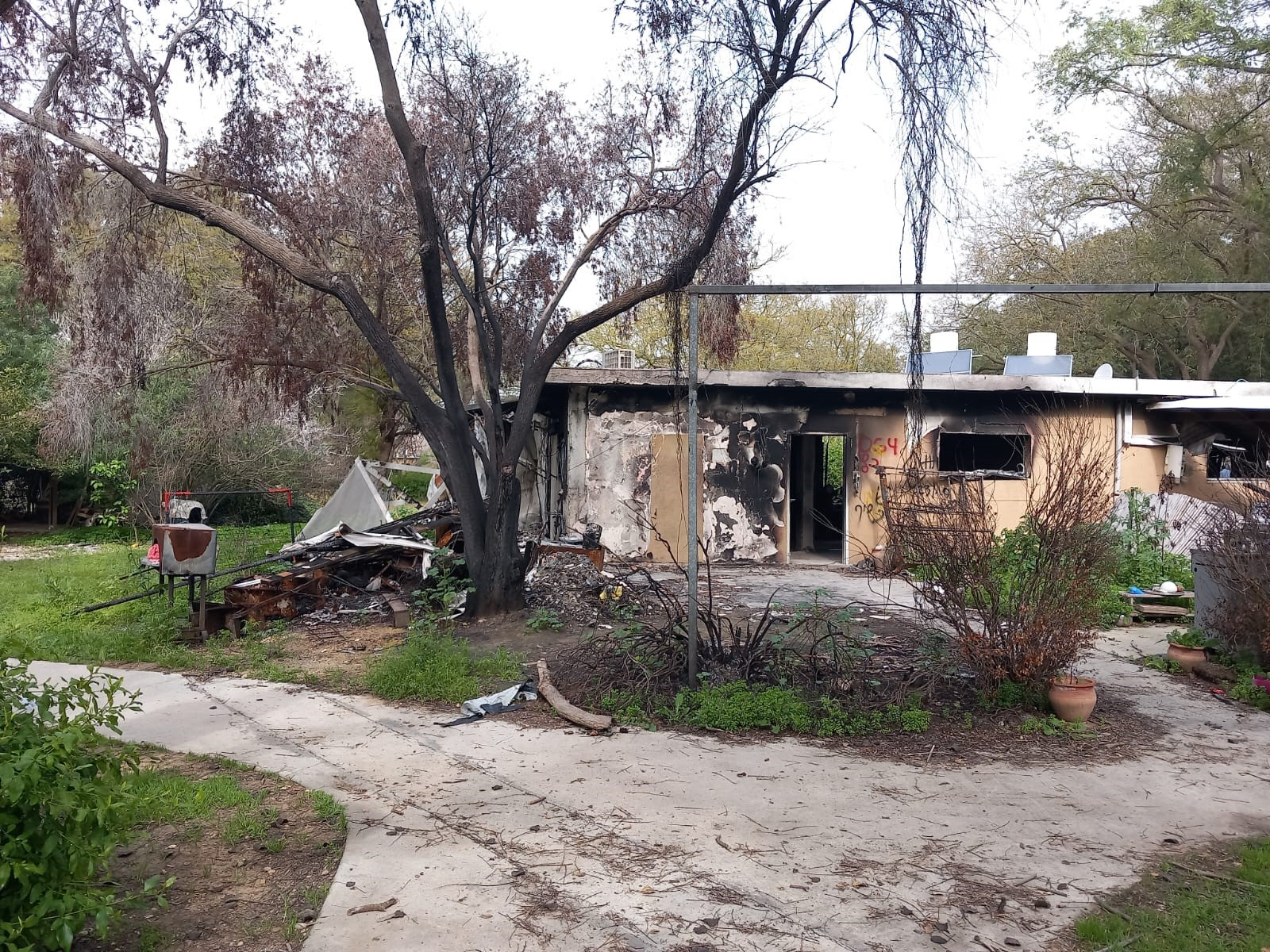
Exterior of burned home and landscaping in kibbutz after the attack

The attack on Israel started at around 6:29 a.m. Israel Summer Time (UTC+3) with a widespread rocket barrage, resulting in many kibbutz residents being in their safe rooms as the attack began. Of the kibbutz's population of around 420 residents, 386 were present during the attack. Some survivors of the Psyduck music festival massacre also sought refuge in the kibbutz.

Under the cover of the rocket barrage, Hamas militants breached the border in numerous areas and invaded Israel. Six of the breaches were in the Nir Oz area, through which fighters from Hamas' Nukhba unit entered, followed later by other Hamas militants, militants from Palestinian Islamic Jihad and the Mujahideen Brigades, and unaffiliated Palestinians. At the time the Israel Defense Forces had 182 combat troops and 57 combat support troops defending Nir Oz and several nearby communities. The IDF bases in the area came under attack during the onslaught and the IDF's command and control in the area initially collapsed.

With the start of heavy rocket fire and Hamas militants spotted approaching the border, two tanks and an armored personnel carrier from a nearby military outpost had positioned themselves along the border close to Nir Oz and Nirim, with one tank south of Nir Oz, the other north of it, and the APC between them. The tank to the south was disabled after being hit by five anti-tank missiles. Three of its crew were killed and another crewman was captured: the bodies and living crewman were taken to Gaza. Footage of this incident circulating online resulted in the tank becoming an attraction for Palestinians during the attack, with hundreds from Khuza'a subsequently reaching the area and many proceeding further into Israel towards Nir Oz from there. This, along with the lack of IDF troops defending the kibbutz giving the invaders a sense of freedom, would result in an unusually large number of attackers invading Nir Oz compared to other communities attacked on 7 October according to the IDF investigation. An estimated 500 Palestinians participated in the attack on Nir Oz, outnumbering the population of the kibbutz. They included civilians who entered alongside fighters, among them children and at least one man in his 60s.

Hamas fighters took out military surveillance cameras on the border close to Nir Oz with sniper rifles at 6:38 a.m. Only one camera, located next to the kibbutz further from the border, continued to function. At 6:42 a.m., Colonel Asaf Hamami, the commander of the Gaza Division's Southern Brigade, alerted the local community security teams in the area. He would later be killed defending Nirim. The kibbutz security team was activated by the security coordinator at 6:43 a.m. At 6:49 a.m., a car carrying two partygoers fleeing the Psyduck festival massacre entered the kibbutz through its main gate, evading the first militants to enter the kibbutz, who arrived 10 seconds later.

At 6:52 a.m., a member of the kibbutz security team exchanged fire with the militants while other members attempted to assist. At 6:55 a.m., another vehicle with fleeing partygoers from the Psyduck music festival was fired on by militants at the entrance to the kibbutz, killing two. At 6:57 a.m., Hamas militants carried out the first murder inside the kibbutz, killing 74 year old Bracha Levinson in her home while livestreaming the murder on her Facebook page. Between 7:11 a.m. and 7:18 a.m., another two vehicles with partygoers fleeing the Psyduck festival arrived at the entrance to Nir Oz, where waiting militants murdered the partygoers. At 7:27 a.m., militants entered Nir Oz through a southern entrance and proceeded to the foreign workers' residences, killing twelve foreign nationals and kidnapping five. The militants continued their rampage in the kibbutz, killing residents in their homes and setting buildings on fire. They began taking hostages at around 8:30 a.m.

The kibbutz security team and other armed kibbutz members attempted to fight off the attack, yet were outnumbered by the amount of Hamas and other militants that had entered the kibbutz. The majority of the kibbutz's security team were killed or taken hostage while attempting to defend the kibbutz. Some security team members and other armed civilians fought from their homes. One member of the security team, Eran Smilansky, shot two militants who entered his home, then fired at a group of six militants gathered nearby and observed them falling. Another armed resident, Yaron Maor, a veteran of the IDF's Givati Brigade, also shot two militants who entered his house and additional ones nearby. The kibbutz security coordinator attempted and failed to link up with an IDF force, and then launched a solo assault. He was wounded but managed to extract himself to his home's safe room, and struggled to communicate in the following hours due to poor reception. Four members of the security team formed an expanded group with three other armed residents and made a stand against the militants, managing to delay some abductions and killings for about two hours, but were overwhelmed and eventually defeated at around 9:00 a.m., with organized resistance coming to an end after that and abductions subsequently ramping up. Afterwards some armed kibbutz members continued to resist individually. Four kibbutz defenders were killed: two members of the security team and two other residents posthumously recognized as members of the security team. The IDF investigation concluded that the security team fought bravely but that even a larger team would not have stood a chance against the sheer number of militants in the kibbutz without backup from the military.

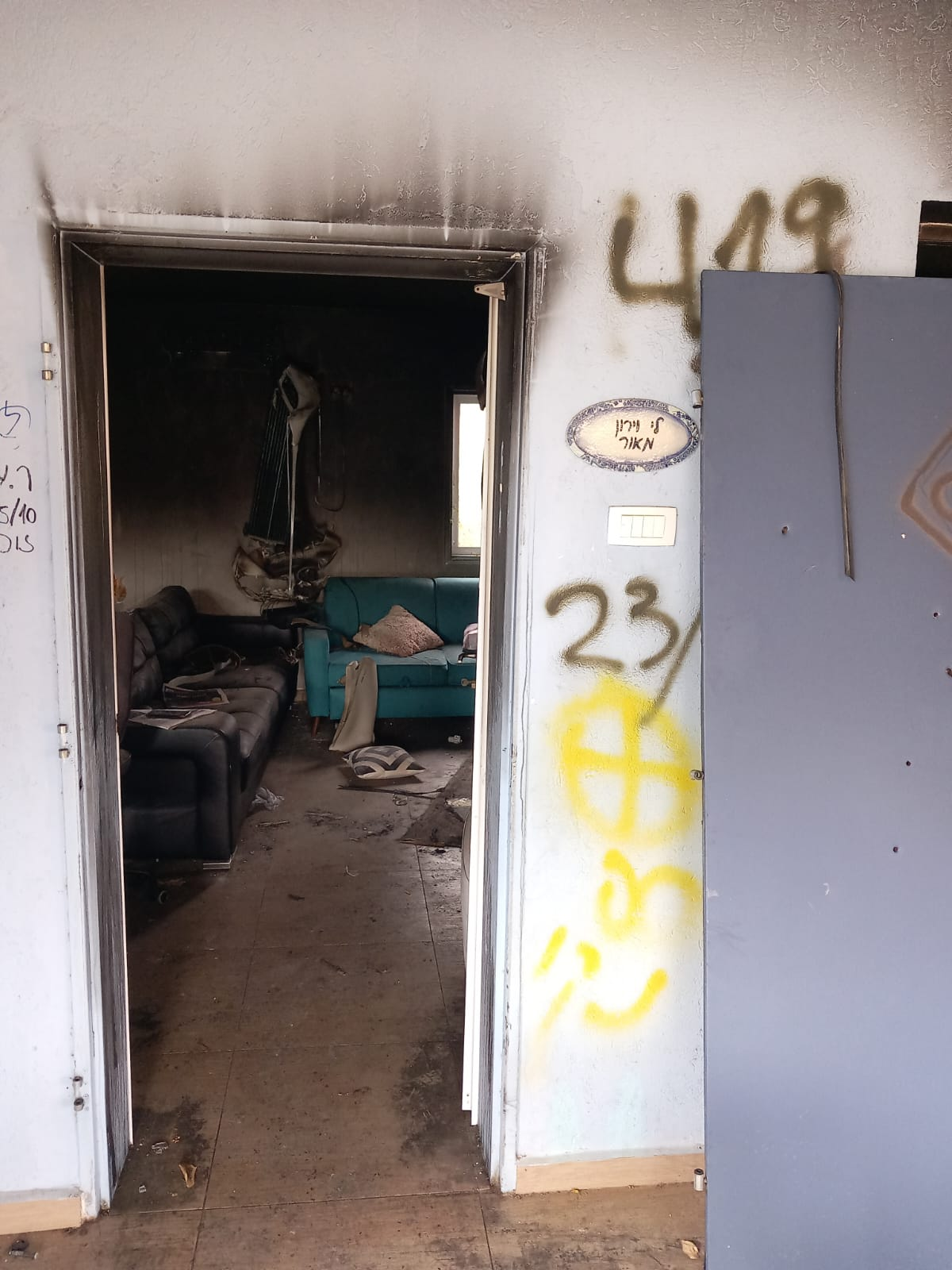
Interior of burned home in the kibbutz after the attack on 7 October

The militants spent several hours in the kibbutz, killing civilians, abducting hostages, and setting fires to homes. A sister received a WhatsApp message from her brother, Yonatan Siman Tov, in the kibbutz that "They're here, they're burning us, we're suffocating." Siman Tov and his mother, wife and three children were all killed in their safe room.

An amateur Palestinian journalist also entered Nir Oz and recorded a live stream of the unfolding events. Survivors of the attack reported that Palestinian civilians from Gaza entered Nir Oz to loot. In one instance, a family taking shelter in their safe room reported hearing looters inside their home rummaging through their belongings, watching Netflix, and preparing food.

At 9:22 a.m., an Israeli Air Force helicopter arrived at the kibbutz and began carrying out strikes on a road leading from Nir Oz to the Gaza border after identifying militants there. The helicopter came under fire and had to make an emergency landing at Hatzerim Airbase. At 9:55 a.m., one of the tanks that had headed for the Gaza border in front of Nir Oz earlier in the morning arrived at the kibbutz. Two of its crew had by then been wounded, with one having been evacuated by an armored personnel carrier. At 9:57 a.m. it fired two shells at militants at the entrance to Nir Oz. The IDF was unable to determine if any were killed, as no bodies were found there, though Hamas fighters may have taken the bodies of those killed back to Gaza. At 10:00 a.m., another Israeli Air Force helicopter arrived over Nir Oz and began firing on militants along the route from the kibbutz to Gaza but soon after received orders to head to the Gaza division base near Re'im, which was under attack. At 10:06 a.m., the tank received an order to leave the area to help prevent a suspected capture of soldiers elsewhere.

At 10:22 a.m., the helicopter returned from the Re'im base and resumed airstrikes against militants on the road between Nir Oz and Gaza. The tank also reached this area and attempted to run over militants. By 10:30 a.m., the militants began to withdraw to Gaza. At 11:30 a.m., the helicopter fired on a tractor being used to transport eight Israeli hostages on the road to Gaza, killing the militants on board as well as hostage Efrat Katz. More militants subsequently arrived with another tractor to collect the surviving hostages. One hostage, Naamit Dekel-Chen, avoided abduction by pretending to be dead. The remaining hostages were recaptured and taken to Gaza. At 12:20 p.m., the helicopter carried out another strike. The last known presence of a militant in the kibbutz was at 12:30 p.m.

The attack was notable due to the fact that IDF reinforcements did not enter the kibbutz while it was taking place. It was subsequently found that the IDF failed to properly assess and respond to the situation at Nir Oz, sending troops to nearby communities under attack. The tank that had operated in the vicinity of Nir Oz failed to enter it. A force of Sayeret Matkal special forces soldiers was dispatched to Nir Oz but they encountered a group of 15 militants at a road junction and in the subsequent clash an officer was killed at about 11:00 a.m. After the firefight, the force was redirected towards Re'im. At around 11:30 a.m., two commando companies from the Egoz Unit were dispatched towards Nir Oz and Kissufim but they encountered militants along the way and battled them before being diverted to other tasks without the IDF Southern Command having been notified. The attack was deemed to be a particularly egregious failure of the IDF on 7 October. It became known as the "failure within failures" of 7 October.

At about 1:10 PM, some 40 minutes after the last militants are estimated to have left Nir Oz, a team from the Yamas tactical unit of the Israel Border Police arrived, constituting the first reinforcements to enter the kibbutz. They were followed by commandos from the Egoz Unit who arrived at 1:47 p.m. and Shayetet 13 naval commandos who arrived at 2:50 p.m. The troops evacuated residents and conducted searches, but there was no combat as by then the militants and looters had all left. The surviving kibbutz members were evacuated to Eilat.

== Casualties and hostages ==
The total death toll was determined to be 47. The number includes six people who fled a nearby rave. The total number of dead from the kibbutz, comprising both those who were killed on 7 October and in captivity in the Gaza Strip, was put at 69.

Hamas militants killed the Israeli-American Kedem-Siman Tov family in their secure room at the kibbutz, including three adults and three children under the age of seven. The killing of Bracha Levinson, an elderly woman from Nir Oz, was reportedly filmed and posted on her Facebook wall by Hamas.

It was initially assumed that Noya Dan, a 12-year-old girl with autism and her 80-year-old grandmother Carmela Dan were among the Hamas hostages. Noya Dan was reportedly a fan of Harry Potter, and author JK Rowling advocated for her release. On 19 October 2023, the bodies of both Noya and Carmela Dan were discovered by the IDF in Gaza, near the Israeli border.

The body of one Palestinian militant was found in the kibbutz. The IDF investigation concluded that several more militants were likely killed by armed kibbutz residents and their bodies were picked up by their comrades. An additional 64 militants killed by IDF helicopters and a tank were found near the kibbutz on a road leading to Gaza.

=== Hostages ===
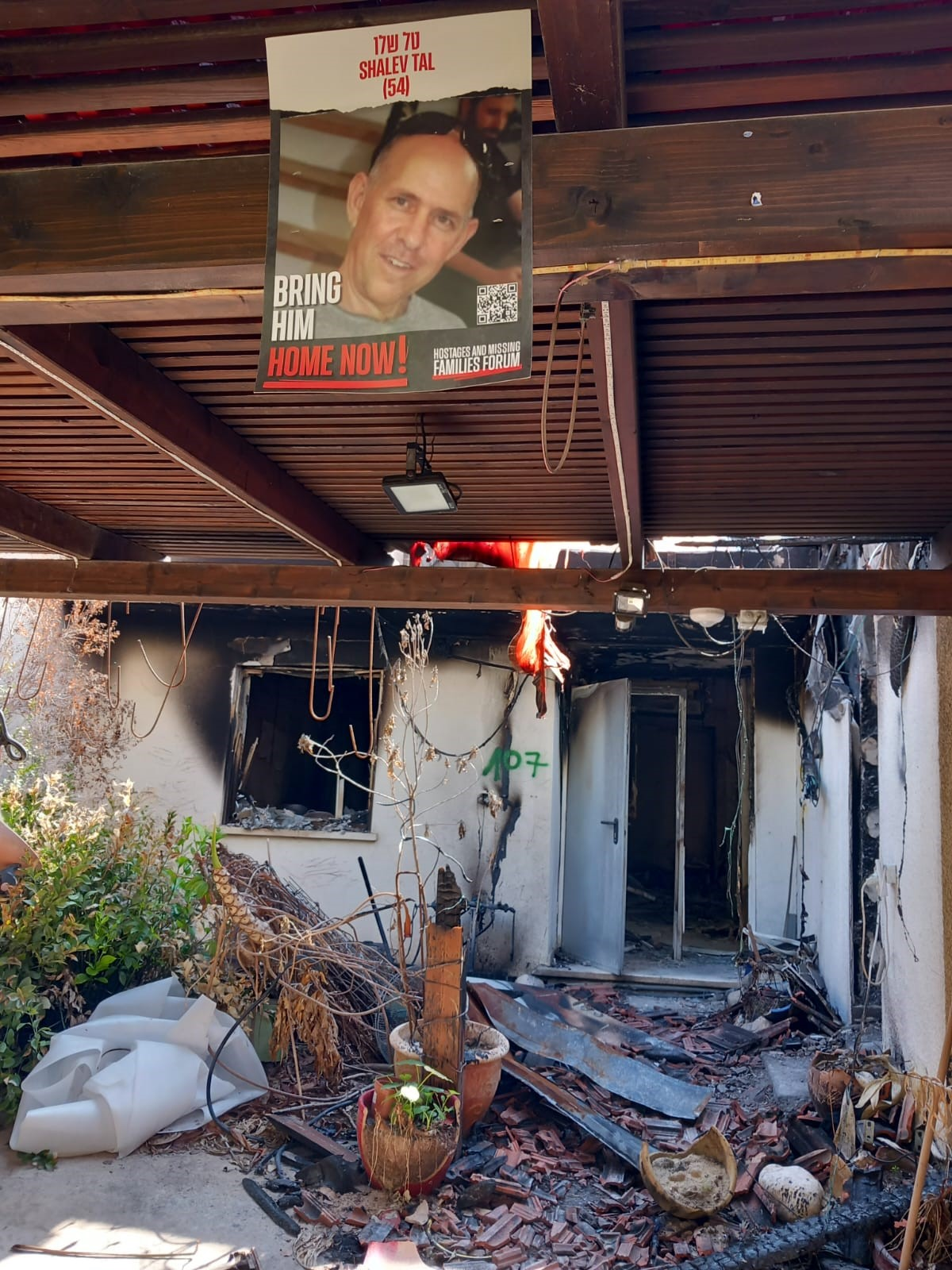
The burnt exterior of the home of David Shalev. He and his son, Tal who was visiting him when the massacre took place (photo on poster attached to awning), were considered missing until they were declared dead on 7 November.

76 people were taken hostage from the kibbutz, of whom 67 were taken alive. The remaining nine were killed in the kibbutz and their bodies were taken to Gaza, were killed en route to Gaza, or were killed in Gaza itself on the same day of their abduction. Another 13 were later killed in Gaza throughout the course of the war.

40 of the 76 hostages were released during the weeklong ceasefire in late November. Prominent abductees from Nir Oz include Polish-Israeli historian Alex Dancyg and Israeli journalist Oded Lifshitz, both of whom subsequently died in captivity. Both men were elderly. The Argentine-Israeli Bibas family was also kidnapped from Nir Oz and became prominent due to the circumstances of their abduction, with nine-month-old Kfir Bibas being the youngest abductee.

Some of the hostages died in captivity. On 1 December 2023, it was announced by the Israel Defense Forces that four kibbutz Nir Oz residents had died in captivity. Israeli-American-Canadian couple Judi and Gadi Haggai were believed to have been captured by Hamas and being held in Gaza. It was reported on 28 December 2023, that Judi had been fatally wounded during the attack and her husband had been announced as deceased about a week prior. Their bodies were recovered by the IDF on 5 June 2025.

An Israeli inquiry into the events analyzed video footage and witness testimonies. The findings indicated that an Israeli helicopter gunship targeted a vehicle containing hostages, manned by militants, resulting in the likely death of an Israeli hostage named Efrat Katz by friendly fire.

== Aftermath ==
A large percentage of the kibbutz residents were killed, wounded, or abducted. An account by veteran war correspondent Itai Anghel reported that "around a quarter of the people of Nir Oz were assassinated, kidnapped, or injured in a very severe way. Those who survived have no place to come back to." The destruction was extensive: militants and looters entered all but six homes in the community.

Survivors of the attack were evacuated by the Israeli government into hotels in Eilat shortly after 7 October attack, however some have returned to the kibbutz. During a visit to the kibbutz by Defense Minister Yoav Gallant, a grandmother of a murdered family confronted him, stating that the government had failed the community and left residents without warning or protection.

In February 2024 Argentine President Javier Milei and Israeli President Isaac Herzog, toured the kibbutz during Milei's bilateral visit to Israel. At the kibbutz Milei reflected on the Argentine-Israeli Bibas family still held hostage and the met with the parents of Argentine-Israeli hostages still held.

Those who still reside in or visited the kibbutz have tied yellow ribbons on trees and marked the mailboxes inside the dining hall with colored stickers to show a residents status; red for deceased, black for hostages, and blue for released individuals. Posters from the Kidnapped from Israel campaign are posted on the homes of hostages.

BBC Verify reported that some social media accounts that supported Hamas denied the killing of children in the kibbutz.

On 4 February 2026, Israel conducted several airstrikes in Gaza, killing at least 20 people. The IDF said that a strike in al-Mawasi targeted Bilal Abu Assi, who was described as a commander in Hamas's Nukhba forces who led the Nir Oz attack and participated in holding hostages. It later confirmed his death.

In October 2026, the IDF killed Ahmed Muhammad Ahmed Baraka, whom the IDF claims was the was involved in the kidnapping of Alexander Dancyg.

== Depiction in media ==
Weeks after the attack, filmmaker Dani Rosenberg filmed a docudrama, Of Dogs And Men, at the kibbutz. Several kibbutz members participated in the film, recounting their experiences and horrors to the camera.

== See also ==
- Kidnapping of the Bibas family
- Outline of the Gaza war
- List of military engagements during the Gaza war
- Palestinian political violence
- Moshe Dayan's eulogy for Ro'i Rothberg
