= Nir Oz =

Kibbutz in southern Israel

Nir Oz: נִיר עֹז (Hebrew)
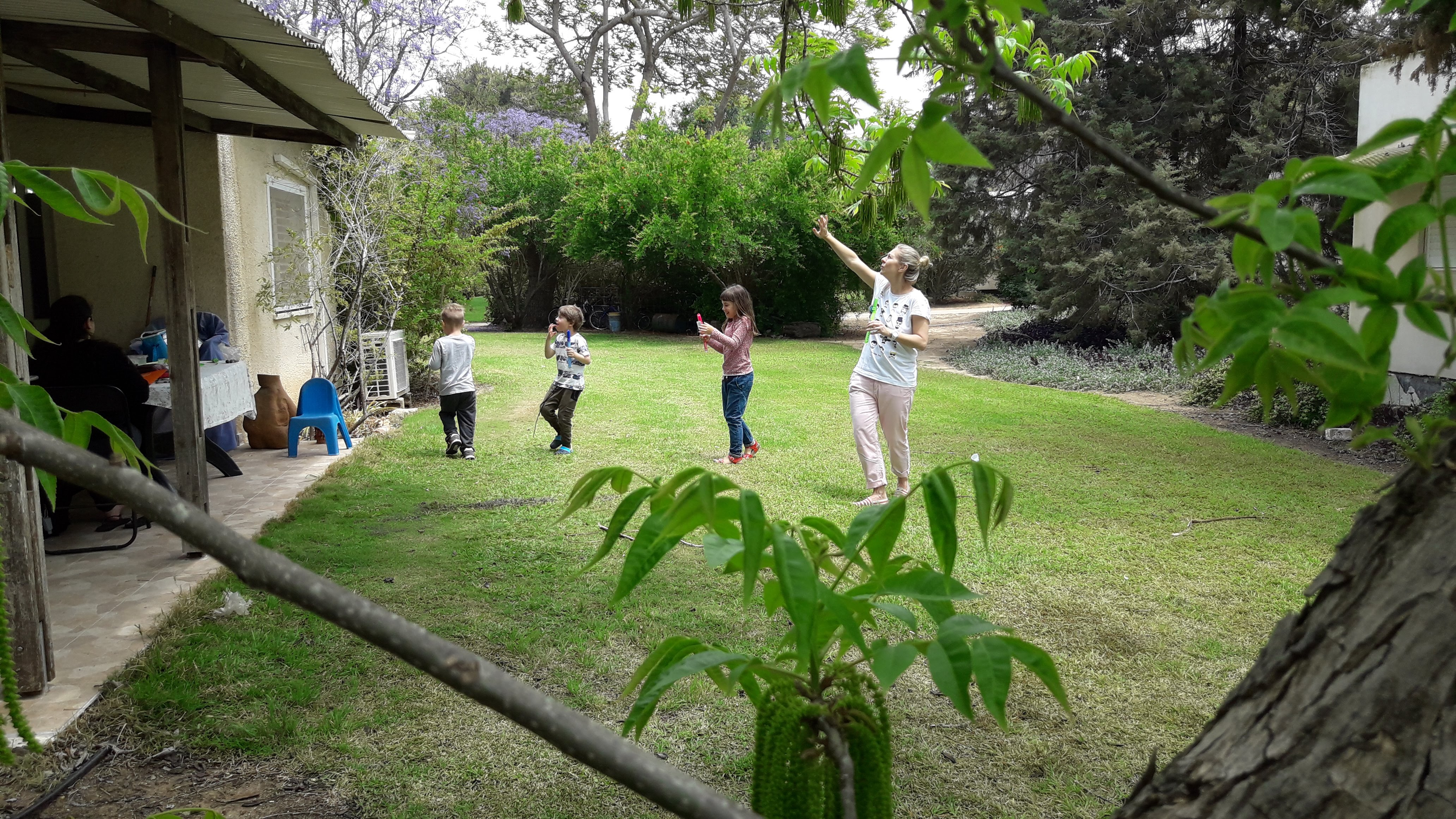

- Location within Northwest Negev region of Israel Location within Israel
- Coordinates: 31°18′37″N 34°24′8″E
- Country: Israel
- District: Southern
- Subdistrict: Beersheba
- Council: Eshkol
- Affiliation: Kibbutz Movement
- Founded: 1 October 1955
- Founder: Nahal
- Population (2024): 373

Nir Oz (Hebrew: נִיר עֹז,, lit. 'Meadow of Strength') is a kibbutz in southern Israel. It is located in the northwestern Negev desert between Magen and Nirim, and covers 20,000 dunams. Nir Oz is under the jurisdiction of Eshkol Regional Council. In 2024 it had a population of 373. The kibbutz developed a low-water intensity landscape, greening its relative region.

The Palestinian militant group Hamas invaded the kibbutz early on 7 October 2023, resulting in a massacre in which about one-quarter of Nir Oz's residents were killed or taken hostage.

== History ==
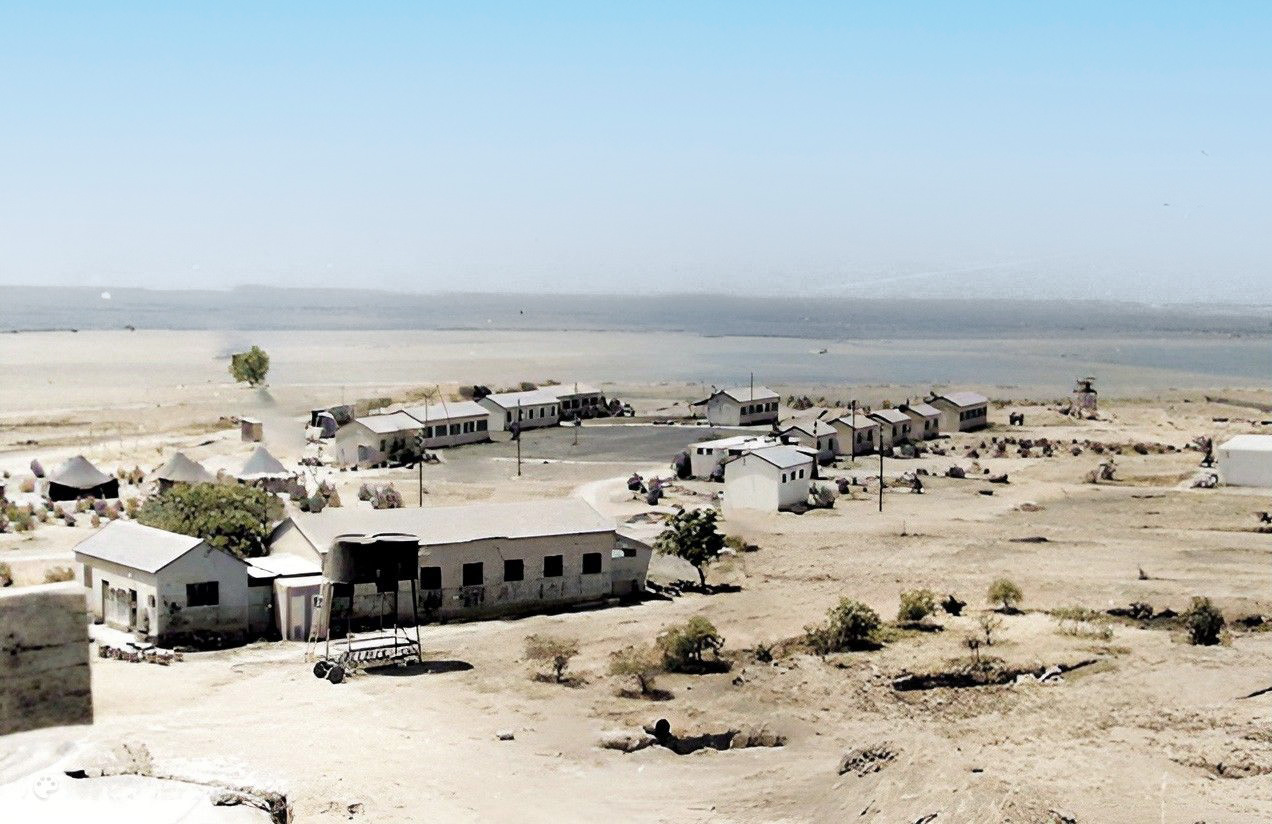
Nir Oz in 1955

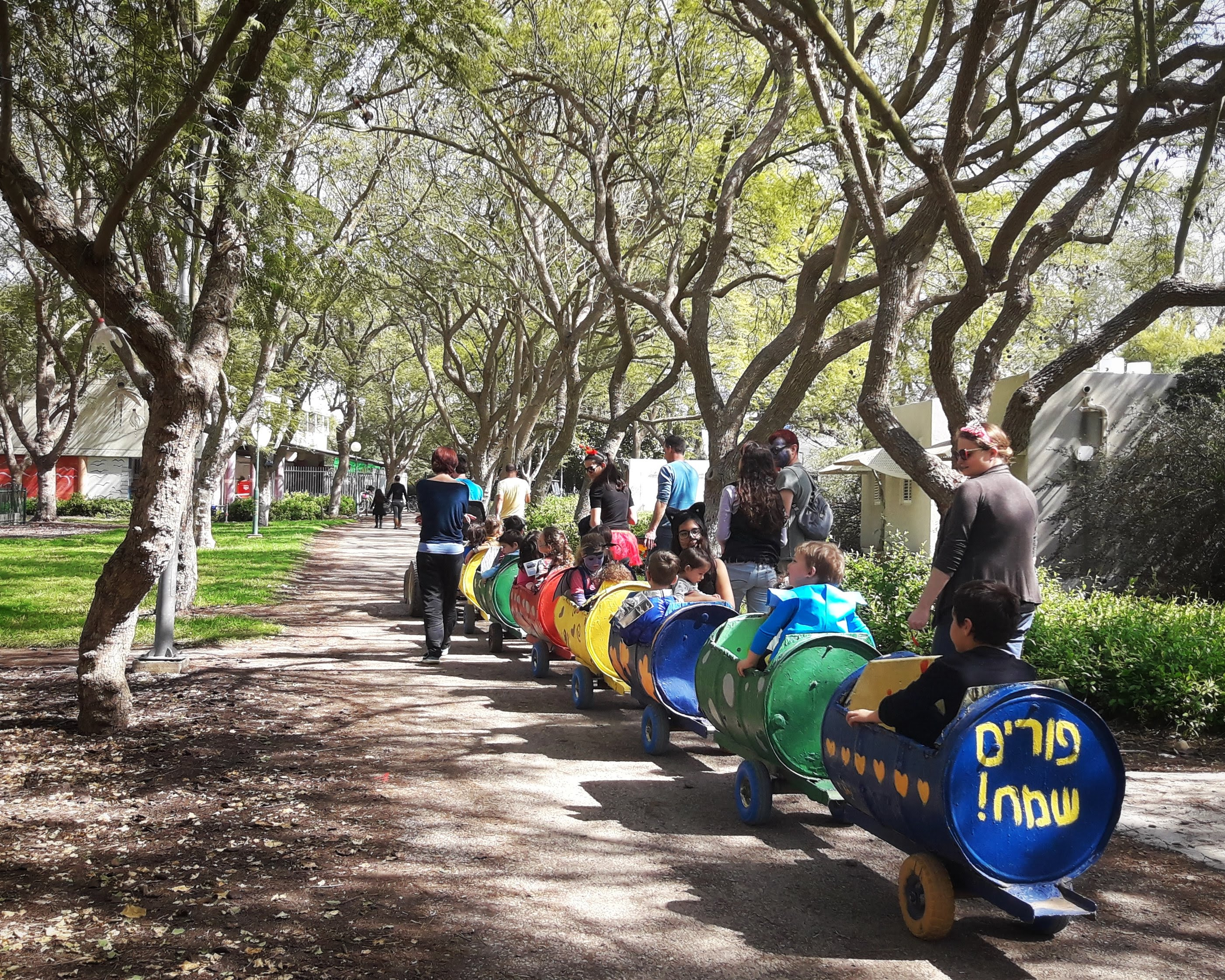
Nir Oz during Purim 2018

Prior to the 1948 Palestine war and the 1948 Palestinian expulsion and flight, the land belonged to the Palestinian village of Ma'in Abu Sitta. Nir Oz was founded on 1 October 1955 as one of the first Nahal settlements. It was established as a military outpost to guard the area between Nirim and Nir Yitzhak from Palestinian incursions. The leftist Zionist Hashomer Hatzair took over Nir Oz in May 1957, with a founding group of 70 members which included Oded Lifshitz. Palestinians from Gaza worked on the kibbutz and constructed many of the buildings later damaged in the October 7 attacks.

After the Israeli disengagement from the Gaza Strip, Nir Oz again became a "border settlement" and frequently received rocket and sniper fire from Gaza. In 2008 the Israel Defense Forces (IDF) asked the kibbutz to harvest its potatoes at night to lower the risk of attack. On 5 June 2008 a mortar bomb fired from the Gaza Strip hit the Nirlat paint factory on the kibbutz, killing an employee and wounding four others. Hamas claimed responsibility for the attack. In 2013, a tunnel from Gaza was found near Nir Oz. James Fergusson reported in a 2023 book that the village had a number of "self-contained bomb shelters, each weighing 67 tons".

In 2021, the kibbutz voted to privatize. Residents were mostly liberal and did not vote for parties associated with Benjamin Netanyahu's coalition. Prior to the Gaza war, some residents volunteered to transport Palestinians from Gaza to receive medical care in Israel.

=== 2023 Hamas attack ===
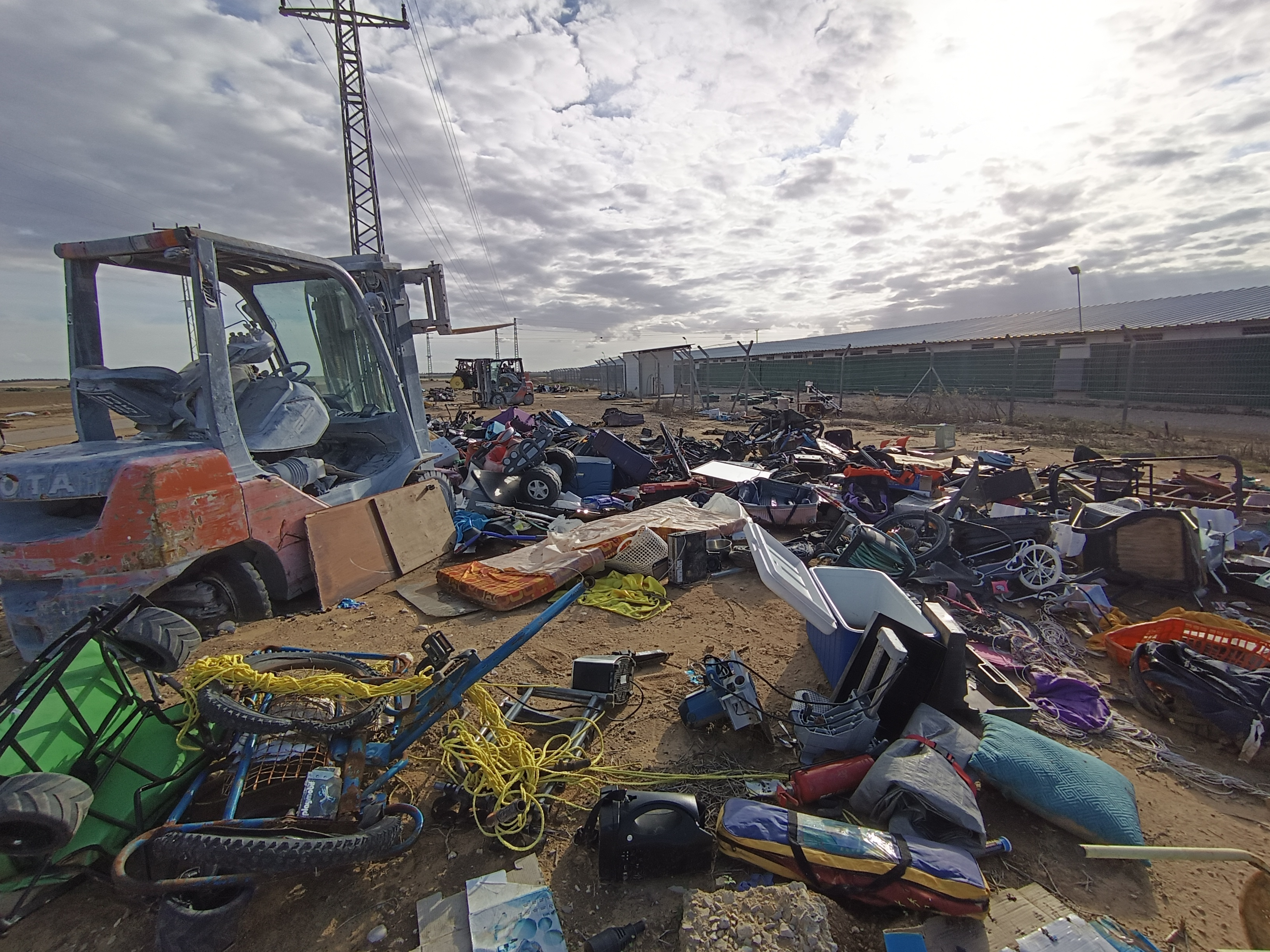
Items of the kibbutz looted by Palestinians and discarded in a nearby field

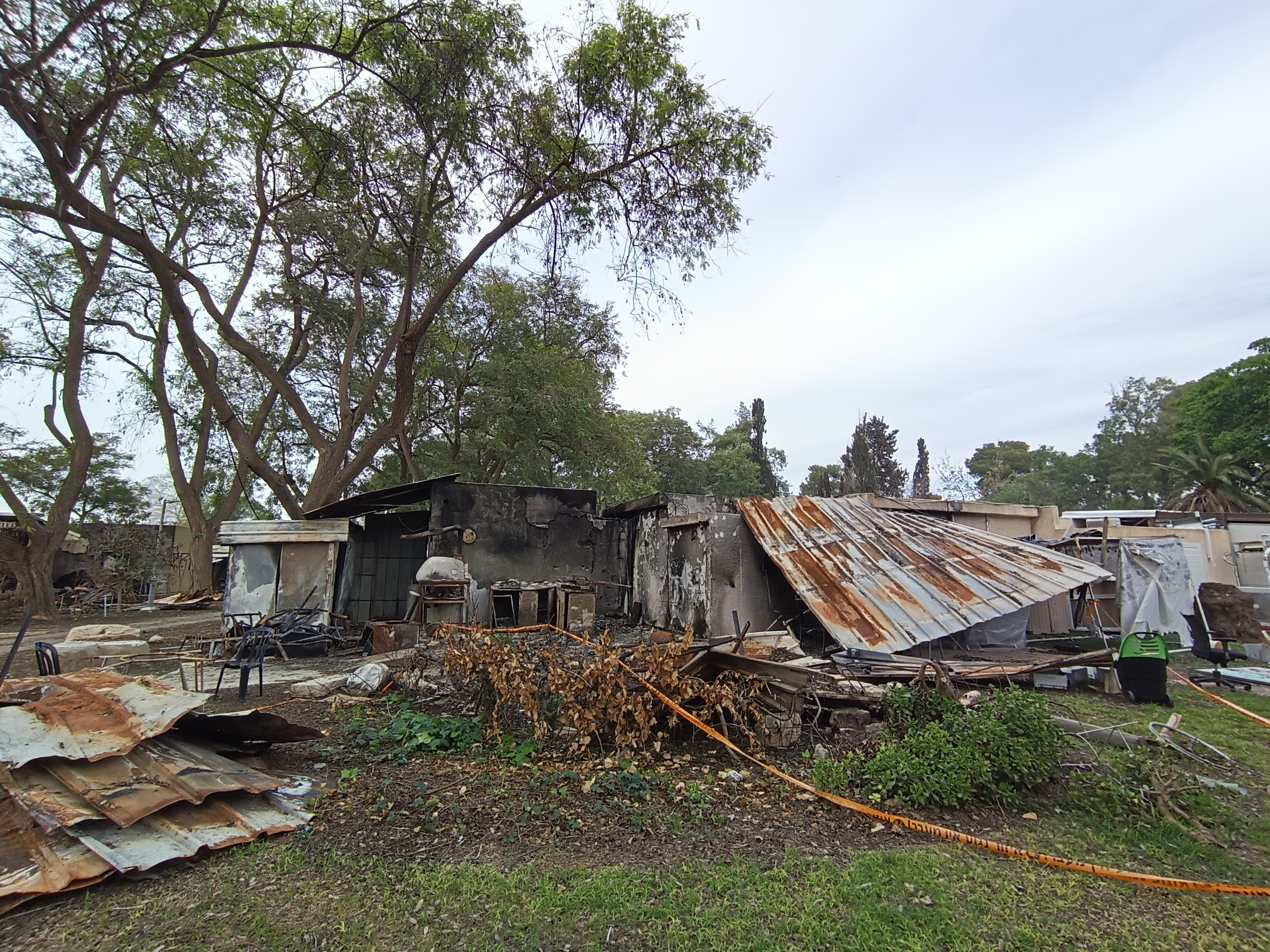
A home burnt by Hamas in October 7

By percent of population, Nir Oz had one of the highest death tolls in the October 7 attacks. About one quarter of the 400 residents of Nir Oz were killed or abducted. About a third of all hostages taken on October 7 were from Nir Oz, including the Bibas family and Oded Lifshitz. The IDF did not arrive on the scene until at least 40 minutes after the attack was over, with militants entering all but six of the over 200 residences at the kibbutz.

The surviving kibbutz members were evacuated to Eilat. In January 2024, many moved to Kiryat Gal. The authority responsible for the rehabilitation of Israeli communities affected by the Hamas attack has estimated that it will take two years to fully rebuild Nir Oz. As of January 2025 Prime Minister Benjamin Netanyahu, had not visited the kibbutz, and was questioned by reporters why he had not done so in November 2023. As of March 2025, only eight residents had returned, and the kibbutz did not yet have a reconstruction plan due to a lack of funding from the Israeli government.

The effort to rebuild the kibbutz began about two years after the attacks, according to Neri Shotan who is the head of the Kibbutz Movements rehabilitation fund. Reportedly the five-year plan for the reconstruction including a memorial wall, totals NIS 19 billion ($5.7 billion USD) for all kibbutz with Nir Oz being designated NIS 350 million ($95 million USD). Released Nir Oz hostage Gadi Moses, spoke at a ceremony to mark the rebuilding and creating foundations. The National Planning and Building Council green lite fast tracking construction of about 200 new housing units and other public buildings in Nir Oz in September 2025.

In October 2025, members of the kibbutz visited their homes and the area to commemorate the attack, those killed and those taken and still held hostage during the attack.

== Economy ==
Nir Oz has agricultural enterprises, a paint factory, and an engineering firm. It is known as a major grower of asparagus. The kibbutz kept a flock of turkeys that escaped or were released during the 2023 Hamas attack and are now roaming freely. The agricultural workers were at one time Gazan, but in recent years workers from Thailand have been employed instead.

As of 2023, the kibbutz was beginning to market itself as an ecotourism destination; agronomist Ran Pauker would provide information about the kibbutz's 900 species of desert-appropriate plantings. Ran Pauker is one of the co-authors of one of the chapters of a 2001 book on combating desertification (sometimes described as oasification) with site-appropriate landscape design.

Drinking water is provided from a desalination plant at Ashkelon; irrigation is performed with recycled water from the Shafdan wastewater treatment plant (for more on Shafdan see here).

== Ecosystem ==
In 1960, Nir Oz introduced a long-term water saving gardening project on 27 acres (110,000 m^{2}) of kibbutz land. Some 750 drought-resistant plants have been tested. The garden, designed by landscape architect Hayyim Kahanovich, uses only 50 percent of the water used in the centre and north of the country. The project is conducted in cooperation with Ben Gurion University of the Negev and serves as a study and observation site for researchers, gardeners, teachers and students from all over the country.

In 2011 the site was part of a program designed to reduce the sight lines of possible assaults launched from Gaza, by way of an Israeli eucalyptus-planting program designed to yield increased tree cover in the western Negev Desert. By 2023, the kibbutz had 65 species of eucalyptus "grown from seed imported from South Africa, South America, [and] Baja California."

== Notable people ==
- Alex Dancyg (1948-2024), historian kidnapped by Hamas during the October 7 attacks and was killed in captivity during the Siege of Khan Yunis
- Hannah Katzir (1948–2024), kindergarten teacher and surviving October 7 Hamas hostage
- Oded Lifshitz (1940-2023), journalist

== See also ==
- List of kibbutzim
- Making the desert bloom
