= Ahmed El-Ghandour =

Egyptian YouTuber (born 1994)

Da7ee7
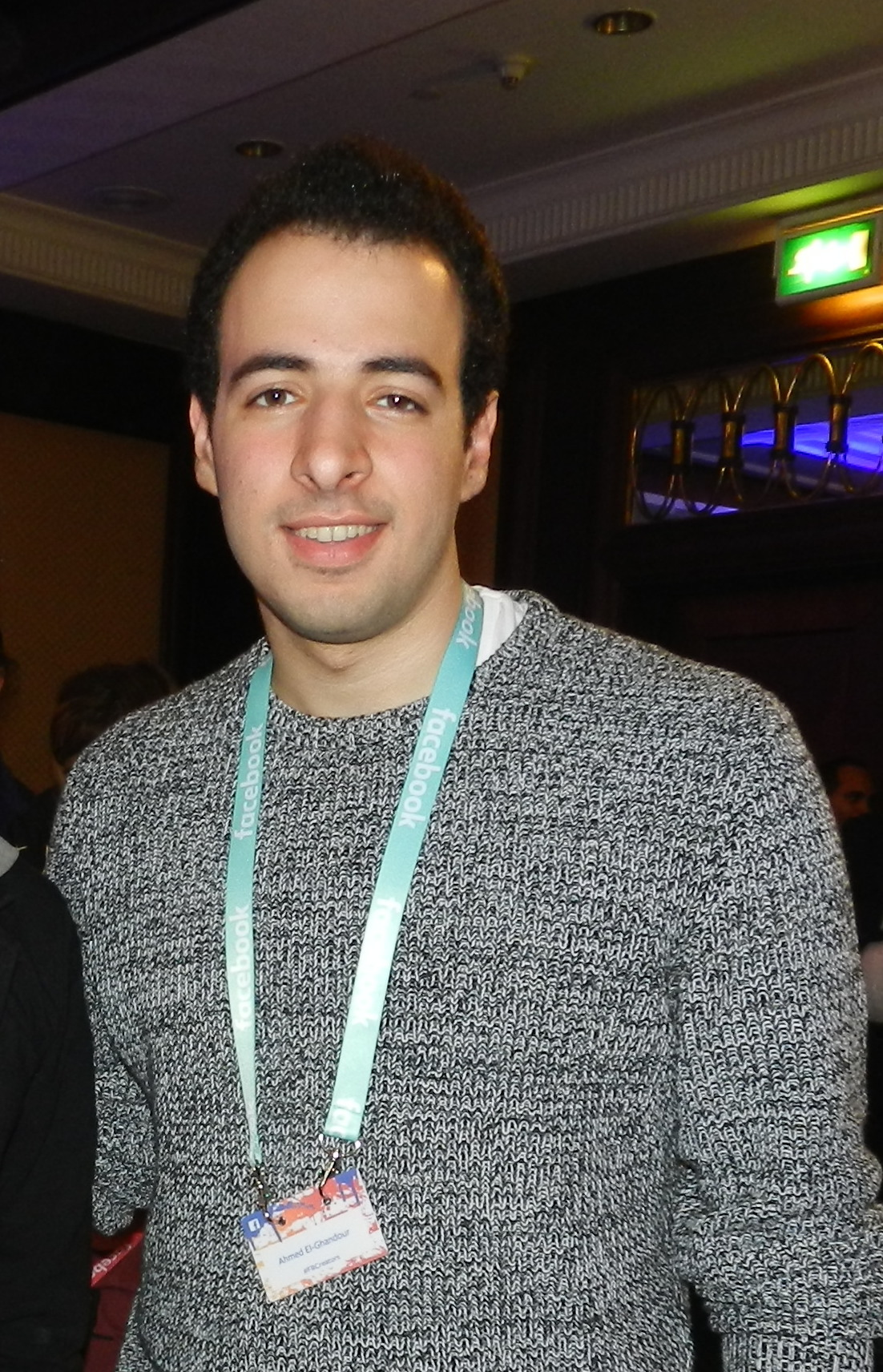
- Born: Ahmed Walid Mohamed El-Ghandour; 12 May 1994; Mansoura, Egypt
- Education: American University of Cairo (BA); University of Hong Kong (MA)
- Occupation: Actor

YouTube information
- Channel: Da7ee7
- Years active: 2014–present
- Genres: Educational film; popular science; educational entertainment
- Subscribers: 2.46 million
- Views: 60.5 million
- Last updated: 11 May 2026

Ahmed El-Ghandour (Arabic: أحمد غندور; born 15 May 1994), is an Egyptian educator and YouTuber, better known as Da7ee7 (The Daheeh), after the name of his YouTube channel. He is a prominent figure in the field of popular science in the MENA region. He holds a bachelor's degree in biology from the American University in Cairo and a master's degree in education from the University of Hong Kong.

Al-Ghandour created his "Da7ee7 – الدحيح" channel on YouTube in 2014 and began posting educational, comic videos. Al-Ghandour's fame increased in Egypt and many Arabic-speaking countries after he signed a contract with Al Jazeera Plus (AJ+) network in 2017. This contract continued until June 9, 2020, when the contract was terminated at the network's request.

In October 2020, the first episode of his new program, "The Daheeh Museum," aired. It's a cultural comedy show broadcast on Shahid.net. In 2021, he presented "The Daheeh" on the New Media Academy Channel before moving to the Museum of the Future Channel. Al-Ghandour was shortlisted for the 2019 IBC World Award for Most Influential Young People in Media.

== Early life and education ==
Ahmed Walid Mohamed El-Ghandour was born on May 15, 1994, in Mansoura. He studied biology at the American University in Cairo and began his career in content creation by posting videos on YouTube in August 2014. He says about his beginnings: "The idea came to me after I participated in a science competition at the British Consulate, where we had to present a scientific idea in three minutes. Many people liked my explanation and asked me to make videos on YouTube."

In the same year, 2014, he was appointed general manager of the University's Student Union. He also presented another program on YouTube related to the university and student affairs. He earned a Bachelor of Applied sciences degree in 2016. In 2017, he enrolled at the University of Hong Kong to obtain a Master's degree.

== Career ==
Ahmed El-Ghandour has become known throughout the Arab world for his unique way of presenting videos, different from most science content creators on YouTube. He often uses humor to simplify complex science topics. In an interview, he stated that he "wants to 'popularize' science and make it accessible to the general public and to people who aren't interested in science or who aren't studying it. I'm trying to add comedy because it's the most appropriate approach for Egyptian society."

Al-Ghandour stated that his goal is to "create content to help and inspire students. We believe that little intellectual, cultural, social, personal, or technological progress can be achieved without the help of the philosophy of science and history. Otherwise, in countries like ours, clouds of fundamentalism will loom."

On June 9, 2020, Ahmed El-Ghandour announced on social media the termination of his YouTube channel "Da7ee7" after three consecutive years. AJ Plus cited its decision to discontinue the program for production reasons, stating, "Production plans during the current difficult period do not allow for the continued broadcast of "Al-Daheeh."

In October 2020, the first episode of his cultural comedy show, "The Daheeh Museum," aired on Shahid.net. He has been broadcasting his show since June 2021 on the New Media Academy YouTube channel.

== Reception ==
Al-Ghandour was included in the list of the most influential people in the Arab world for 2018, and the Arab Youth Center selected him for its "Arab Youth Pioneers" list, which includes "a group of young people under the age of 35 from various Arab countries who have a proven track record of achievements that have had a positive impact on their communities."

Al-Ghandour was shortlisted for the 2019 IBC Global Young Influencer in Media Award, presented to those who "have made a real impact through their passion, ambition, and commitment and are making an outstanding contribution to the media industry, whether creative, commercial, or technical."

== See also ==
- Bassem Youssef
- Ahmed Haggag (Haggagovic)
- Youssef Hussein
- Popular science
- MENA region
