= Joe Show =

Arabic talk show and political satire television program

- Genre: Comedy; A satirical politician
- Country of origin: Egypt
- Original language: Arabic
- No. of seasons: 10

Production
- Running time: 53 minutes

Original release
- Network: Al Araby Television Network
- Release: 6 June 2016 – present

Joe Show (Arabic: جو شو, previously JoeTube) is an Arabic YouTube talk show and political satire program hosted by Egyptian comedian Youssef Hussein.

== Description ==
It airs each Thursday. The show deals mainly with the events in the Arab world in a comic and cynical manner. The 53-minute program exploits the media lapses, media biases, and striking paradoxes in the rhetoric of political and conflicting positions; It is reintroduced comically. The show consists of 4 segments; the first three cover current events in Egypt, the fourth looks at the rest of the Arab world.

The show is produced by the Qatar-based studio Metafora Productions.

== See also ==
- Al Bernameg
- Le Petit Journal
