= Abbad Yahya =

Palestinian author

- عبّاد يحيى
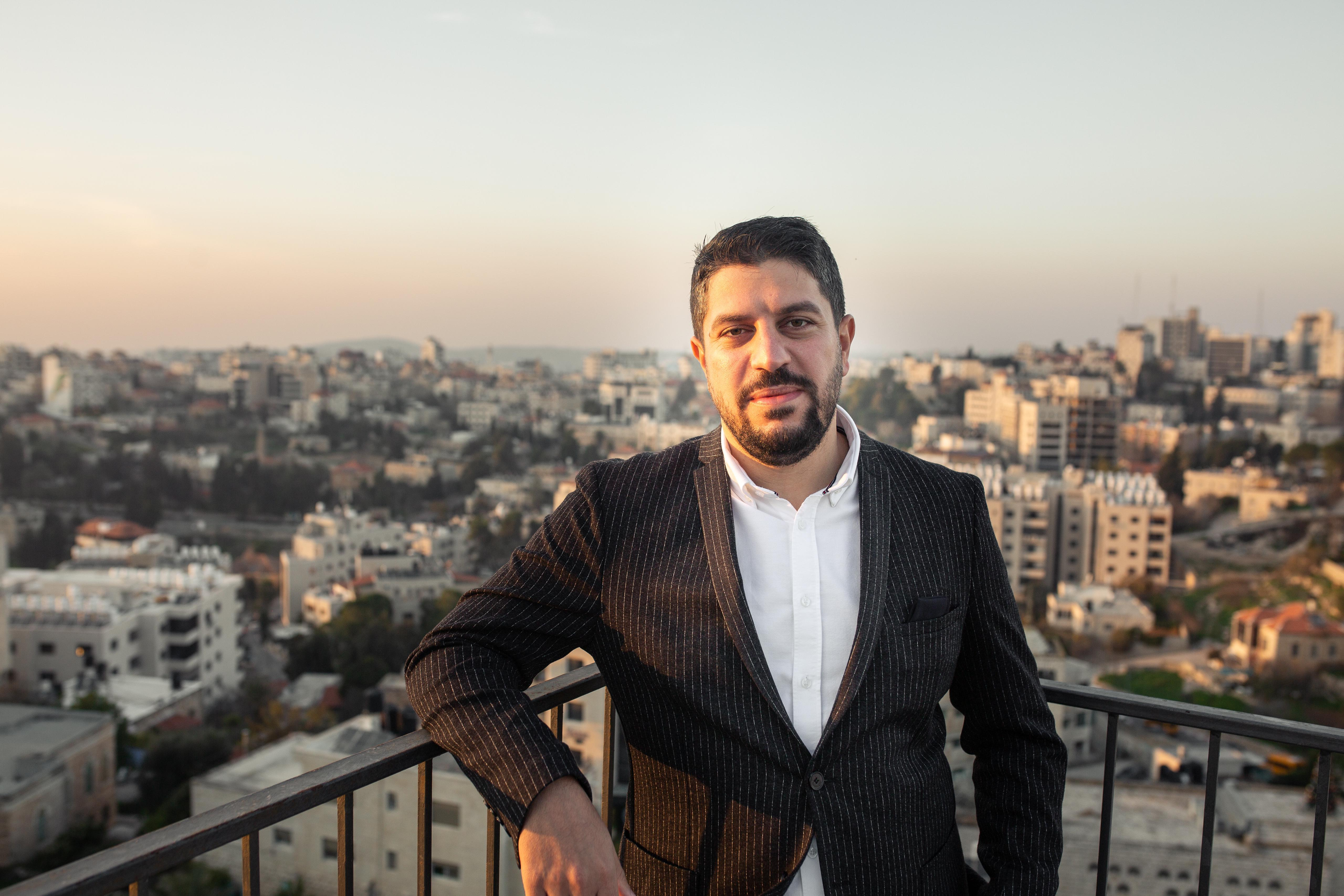
- Abbad Yahya
- Born: February 29, 1988 (age 38); Jenin, Palestine
- Education: Master’s degree in Sociology from Birzeit University
- Occupation: General Manager at Al Araby Television Network
- Writing career
- Language: Arabic
- Years active: 2009 - Now
- Notable work: A Crime in Ramallah
- Notable awards: Index on Censorship Shortlist
- Website: abbadyahya.com

Abbad Yahya (Arabic: عبّاد يحيى); born in Palestine in 1988 is a Palestinian author and novelist, researcher, and media professional. He holds a Master’s degree in Sociology from Birzeit University in Palestine. Over the years, he has held various positions in media and research institutions across multiple Arab and international organizations. Currently, he holds the position of "General Manager" at Al Araby Television Network.

== Early life and education ==
Abbad Yahya was born on February 29, 1988, in the city of Jenin, located in the northern West Bank, Palestine. He completed his primary and secondary education in his hometown before moving to Ramallah to pursue higher studies at Birzeit University. There, he earned a bachelor's degree in radio and television, followed by a master's degree in sociology.

== Career ==
Abbad Yahya began his career in media and research as a correspondent for Radio Monte Carlo International, where he worked for three years. Simultaneously, he contributed as a columnist for Al-Araby Al-Jadeed newspaper. His early career also included experience in academic research, serving as an assistant researcher at the "Arab Center for Research and Policy Studies".

In 2013, he transitioned into media management, taking on the role of managing editor at Tabayyun: Journal for Philosophy and Critical Theory Studies. Building on this experience, he later became the editor-in-chief of UltraSawt and subsequently CEO of Jeel Media, a company specializing in digital marketing.

His career continued to advance when he joined Fadaat Media Group, the parent company of Al Araby Television Network. During this time, he also played a key role as a founding board member and editorial director of Manhajiyat magazine.

In 2022, Abbad Yahya was appointed general manager of Al Araby Television Network, headquartered in Lusail, Qatar. In addition to leading the network, he is also a board member of the Arab International Academy in Qatar.

== Works ==
=== Novels ===
Abbad Yahya is one of the most renowned Palestinian authors in his generation. He has published five novels:

1. Yahduth Fi Al-Buyoot (Happens in Homes): Published in 2025. Is set in Ramallah during the 1970s and 1980s, where a chance encounter between a young man and a woman leads to a secret operation that changes their lives. The story explores Ramallah’s transformations after the 1967 occupation, unveiling, through the memories of the now elderly narrator, the mysteries of the past and his connection to the woman and the lawyer. With a balanced literary style, the novel captures a distinct Palestinian spirit, documenting a pivotal period in the city's history.
2. Rām Allāh (Ramallah): Published in 2020. A sweeping historical novel, Ramallah offers an epic portrayal of the city's transformation over 150 years, from the Ottoman era to the present Palestinian Authority period. The novel captures the social and political changes that have shaped the city and its people, highlighting themes of war, migration, love, and betrayal.
3. Jarīmah fī Rām Allāh (Crime in Ramallah): Published in 2017. This novel revolves around the interwoven lives of three young men in Ramallah, whose personal stories become entangled with a mysterious murder. The book provides a deep psychological exploration of its protagonists and their transformations within a complex social context. The novel sparked considerable controversy, with discussions centering on its characters, symbolism, and its critique of societal norms.
4. Hātif ʻumūmī (Public telephone): Published in 2015. In this novel, Abbad Yahya presents an indirect critique of social and cultural realities, focusing on character development rather than direct commentary on political occupation. Through a modern and evolving narrative style, the novel deeply examines individual experiences and traces social transformations, offering a fresh perspective on contemporary Palestinian literature.
5. Al-Qism 14 (Section 14): Published in 2014. This novel examines the impact of Western military dominance on Third World societies through the lens of a military camp led by a nationalist colonel. The story delves into the internal struggles and external challenges faced by the camp’s leadership while exploring the complex relationship between civilians and the military, as well as the role of foreign interventions in shaping individual and collective identities.
6. Rām Allāh al-shaqrāʼ (Blonde Ramallah): Published in 2013, "describes the fractured Ramallah landscape and where the influx of foreigners – particularly women – serves as a trope for a range of post-Oslo dissatisfactions from social and economic divisions to failures in resistance and solidarities".

=== Researches ===
In addition to his literary works, Abbad Yahya has published several academic and research papers that delve into colonial impact, socio-political structures, and knowledge production in the Arab world, which are:

1. Colonial Impact and Fragmentation: Examines how statistical methodologies in the occupied territories since 1967, particularly post-Oslo, contributed to societal fragmentation and control mechanisms.
2. Arab Preoccupation with the Cognitive/Ideological Binary: Analyzes the influence of national commitment on social research in the West Bank before Oslo, critiquing the knowledge vs. ideology debate in Arab intellectual discourse.
3. Oral History and Double Marginalization: Investigates Nakba narratives of Palestinian peasant women from Mughallis, questioning the homogeneity of personal testimonies. This study was referenced by historian Salim Tamari.

== Crime in Ramallah ==
In 2016 Abbad Yahya published his fourth novel, Jarīmah fī Rām Allāh (Crime in Ramallah), which was banned by the Palestinian authorities for "indecency". Attorney General Ahmed Barak said that the novel contained "indecent texts and terms that threaten morality and public decency, which could affect the population, in particular minors". The novel tracks the lives of three young Palestinian men who meet in Ramallah. The youths, one of whom is gay, work together in a bar where the murder of a young woman takes place. The gay person is arrested by the authorities and interrogated. Although he is cleared of charges, the police realize that he is gay and start torturing and humiliating him for that reason. The young man moves to France in search of a place where he is accepted and not judged based on his sexual orientation.

In some parts of the novel the writer ridicules the Palestinian leaders and criticize them, portraying them as "losers". The novel is particularly criticized for it use of graphic sexual language and description.

The ban was widely criticized by Palestinian and Arab writers and journalists, who issued a statement condemning the novel ban and called on the Palestinian authorities to respect the ideals of freedom of speech and opinion.

The novel received a huge official backlash in Palestine. The head of the Palestinian Writers Union, Murad Sudani, said that Abbad Yahya's novel violates "he national and religious values of the society in order to appease the West and win prizes".

== Awards ==
In 2017 Abbad Yahya was the recipient of the German Pen Center "Writers in-Exile" fellowship which is dedicated to writers who are persecuted in their home countries. Abbad Yahya was also shortlisted for the Index on Censorship Award for freedom of expression for the year 2018. Abbad Yahya was among 16 people and organizations deemed by the judges as "champions", considering their fight for freedom of expression in the world.
