= As'ad Abu Shari'a =

Mujahideen Brigades leader (1977–2025)

- الأسعد أبو شريعة

Personal details
- Born: February 1977 Sabra, Gaza City
- Died: 7 June 2025 (aged 48) Gaza City, Gaza Strip
- Cause of death: Assassination by airstrike

Military service
- Allegiance: Palestinian Mujahideen Movement
- Branch/service: Mujahideen Brigades
- Rank: General-Secretary
- Battles/wars: Gaza war; 2023 Hamas-led attack on Israel; 2023 Israeli invasion of the Gaza Strip X

As'ad Abu Shari'a (Arabic:الأسعد أبو شريعة), also known as Asaad Abu Sharia or Abu al-Shayk, was a Palestinian militant and the leader of Palestinian Mujahideen Movement and its armed wing Mujahideen Brigades.

== Early life ==
Abu Shari'a was born into a Palestinian refugee family in Sabra, Gaza City. He earned a law degree from Al‑Azhar University, Gaza. He began his career in Gaza’s local judiciary before transitioning to political and military leadership.

== Militant career ==
On 24 April 2007, he became the Secretary-General of the Palestinian Mujahideen Movement and also Commander of its armed wing Mujahideen Brigades, assuming leadership following his brother’s death from the injuries sustained in an Israeli assassination attempt.

Under his leadership, the Brigades became active in both the Gaza Strip and West Bank, coordinating with Hamas and Palestinian Islamic Jihad under the Palestinian Joint Operations Room.

=== Gaza War ===
Abu Shari'a was identified by Israeli authorities as a key planner and participant in the Nir Oz attack during the 2023 Hamas-led attack on Israel.

Under his leadership, he was linked to kidnapping and killing of Israeli civilians, including Shiri Bibas and her two young sons, the American-Israeli couple Gad Haggai and Judi Weinstein-Haggai, Thai hostage Nattapong Pinta, and at least one other foreign national.

== Assassination ==
On 7 June 2025, an Israeli airstrike killed him in a Sabra neighbourhood in Gaza City alongside his wife, children, his brother, Ahmed, and senior operative Mahmoud Muhammad Hamid Kuhail.

The Mujahideen Brigades also confirmed his death along with his family.

== See also ==
- October 7 attacks
- Kidnapping and killing of the Bibas family
