= Kidnapping and murder of the Bibas family =

Israeli hostages killed in Gaza

Kidnapping and killing of the Bibas family
- Part of the Nir Oz attack and the Gaza war hostage crisis
- The Bibas family kidnapping was two different events. Top (first kidnapping): Yarden Bibas (behind the man driving the motorcycle and holding a gun) being kidnapped to Gaza. Bottom (second kidnapping): Shiri Bibas holding her two young children during their kidnapping.
- Location: Nir Oz, Israel (kidnapping); Gaza Strip (killing of Shiri and two children)
- Date: 7 October 2023 (kidnapping) (Note: Yarden Bibas was kidnapped first and his wife and children were kidnapped later in the day by a different group of militants.); November 2023 (killing of Shiri and two children)
- Attack type: Kidnapping and killing
- Accused: Kidnapping: Lords of the Desert, Mujahideen Brigades, and Hamas; Killing: Hamas (per Israel); Israel (per Hamas)

During the Nir Oz attack, part of the 7 October 2023 attacks that began the Gaza war, Palestinian terrorists kidnapped the Bibas (Hebrew: בִּיבָּס) family from their home at the Nir Oz kibbutz in southern Israel. The family, which held multiple citizenship of Israel, Argentina, and Germany, comprised 34-year-old Yarden (יַרְדֵּן), his 32-year-old wife Shiri (שִׁירִי; née Silberman), and their sons, 4-year-old Ariel (אֲרִיאֵל) and 9-month-old Kfir (כְּפִיר). All four family members were held hostage in the Gaza Strip. Yarden Bibas was abducted separately from his wife and children and held by Hamas, while Shiri Bibas and her children were reportedly held by another militant group, the Mujahideen Brigades. Ariel and Kfir Bibas, two of the youngest hostages taken from Israel on 7 October, came to be regarded as symbols of the Gaza war hostage crisis.

Shiri Bibas's parents, José Luis (Yossi) Silberman and Margit Shnaider Silberman, were both killed in the Nir Oz attack. In November 2023, Hamas claimed that Shiri Bibas and her children had been killed in an Israeli airstrike. On 30 November, the last day of the 2023 Gaza war ceasefire, Hamas offered to return their bodies and release Yarden Bibas, but Israel insisted that all living female hostages be released first. As part of the January 2025 Gaza war ceasefire, Hamas released Yarden Bibas on 1 February 2025 after he had spent 484 days in captivity. On 20 February, it handed over coffins that it said contained the bodies of his wife and sons. Israel verified the remains of Ariel and Kfir Bibas through DNA testing but accused Hamas of violating the ceasefire agreement after finding that the female remains did not match Shiri Bibas or any other Israeli hostage still held by Hamas. Hamas handed over another body the following day, which DNA testing confirmed as that of Shiri Bibas. Argentina held two days of national mourning. To mark the funeral of Shiri, Ariel, and Kfir Bibas on 26 February, buildings and monuments in the Western world were illuminated in orange, the color of the boys' hair. Shiri Bibas and her sons were buried alongside her parents in Tsoher Regional Cemetery, near their former home.

Contradicting claims by Hamas that Shiri Bibas and her children had been killed in an Israeli airstrike, the Israeli government said that forensic evidence indicated that they were killed by their captors and that their corpses were mutilated to simulate injuries from a bombing. Although it did not release the evidence to the public, Israel said it had shared evidence with its international partners. Hamas accused Israel of "baseless lies".

== Abduction ==
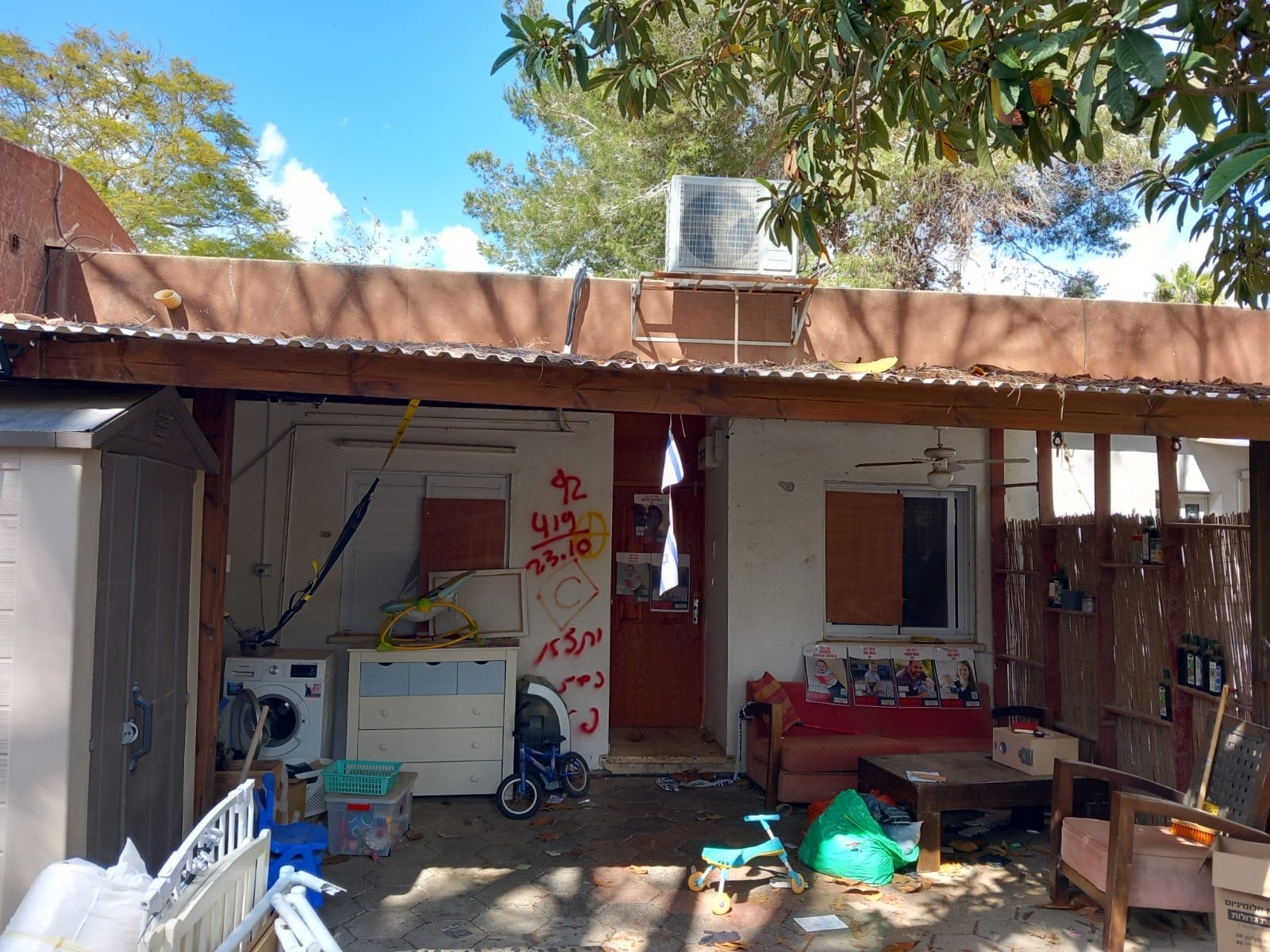
The Bibas family home after the kidnapping.

Prior to the attack, the family had considered moving to the Golan Heights because they were tired of living in constant fear of rocket attacks due to their proximity to Gaza. Shiri Bibas's parents, José Luis (Yossi) Silberman and Margit Srehnaider Silberman, both in their 60s, had moved to Israel from Peru in the 1970s. Yossi Silberman was originally from Argentina.

On the day of the attack, Yarden Bibas texted his sister, Ofri Bibas Levy, from the family's safe room to update her on the fighting at and around the Nir Oz kibbutz. At around 6:30 a.m., he sent a message mentioning rocket fire, and then stated that the militants had entered the kibbutz. He expressed concern that his children did not know how to keep quiet. Militants gained entrance to the Bibas home by drilling open the front door. At about 9:45 a.m., Yarden Bibas texted "They're in", shortly after having texted "I love you" to his family.

Yarden Bibas had reportedly hesitated to use the gun in the home due to the number of militants with automatic weapons. He left the safe room, reportedly in an effort to distract the militants and save his wife and children. He was then captured separately from the rest of his family.

Media footage of the kidnapping was circulated online, including a video of Shiri Bibas holding her redheaded children in her arms, looking terrified as militants surrounded them. Separate images showed Yarden Bibas, bleeding from the head, being taken away on a motorcycle. Shiri Bibas's parents, the Silbermans, were killed during the attack on the kibbutz, and their bodies were not identified until 21 October.

Israel said that Shiri Bibas and her sons had been kidnapped by a Palestinian crime gang from Khan Younis called "Lords of the Desert". Israel expressed concern that they had been transferred to a different armed group within Gaza, the Mujahideen Brigades of the Palestinian Mujahideen Movement.

== Yarden's captivity ==
Following his abduction, Yarden Bibas reportedly asked his captors on numerous occasions about his wife and children. In one instance his captors told Yarden Bibas that his family had evaded capture and had been spotted in Tel Aviv. In another case, his captors demanded that another hostage tell him that his family had died. Hamas filmed Yarden Bibas breaking down upon hearing this and criticizing Benjamin Netanyahu. A couple of months after his release, Yarden Bibas told Lesley Stahl in an interview for 60 Minutes that after informing him of the death of his wife and children, his captors would repeatedly tell him "Oh, doesn't matter. You'll get a new wife. Get new kids. Better wife. Better kids."

In May 2025, Yarden told Israel's Channel 12 that on November 27, 2023, his fellow hostage and close friend and neighbor from Nir Oz, David Cunio, was put together in the cell with him. He remembered the date because it was the day that Cunio's wife and twin daughters were released. Later, during a visit of the hostages by Hamas leader Yahya Sinwar, Yarden asked Sinwar to remain together with Cunio. According to Yarden, Sinwar had agreed to the request, but approximately two weeks later Yarden was separated from Cunio without being given an explanation.

== Efforts to release ==
Israelis taking up the cause of the Bibas family

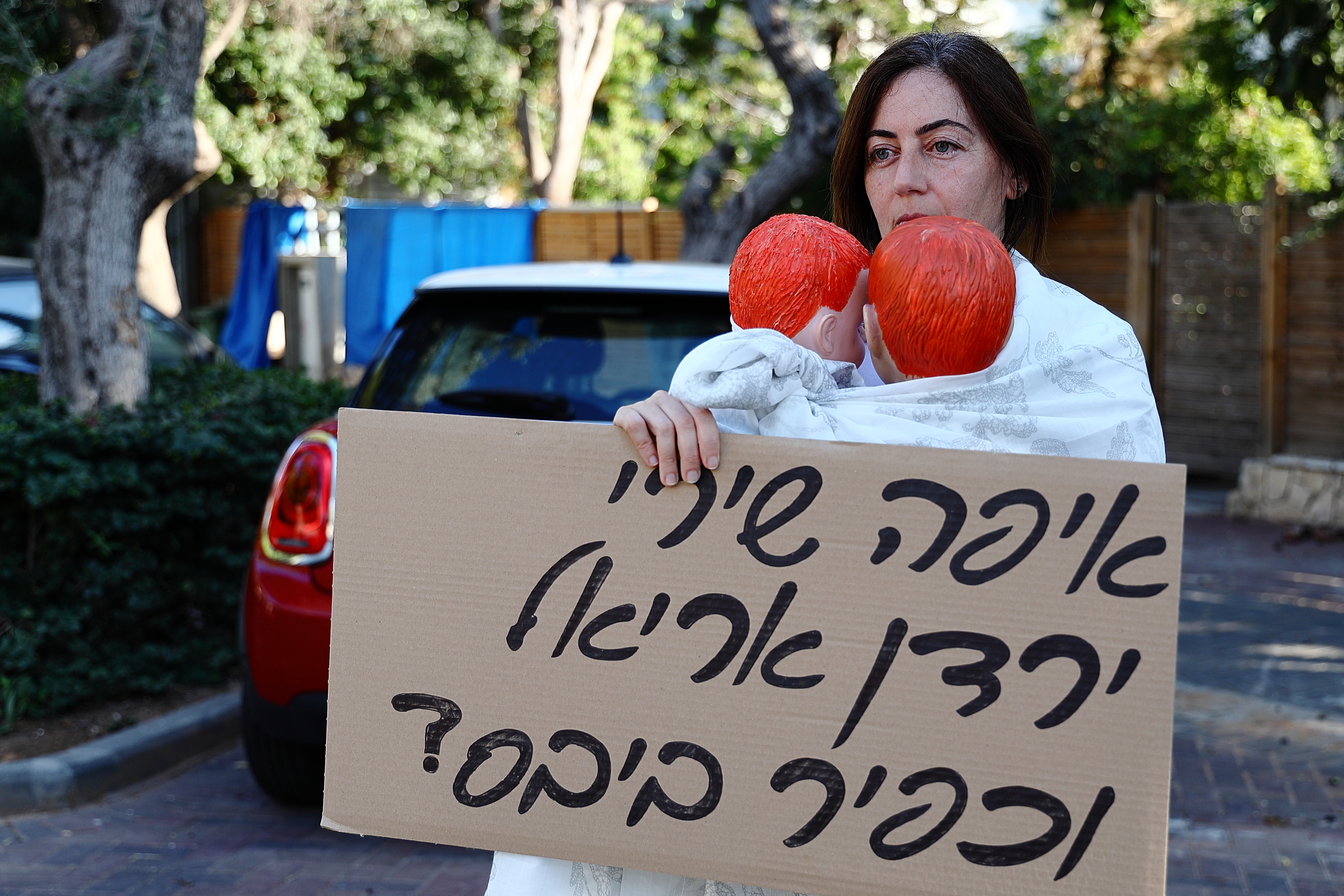
A protestor in front of the private residence of Israeli President Isaac Herzog recreating the still image from the bodycam video. (Note: The text on the cardboard reads "Where are Shiri, Yarden, Ariel, and Kfir Bibas?")
– August 2024

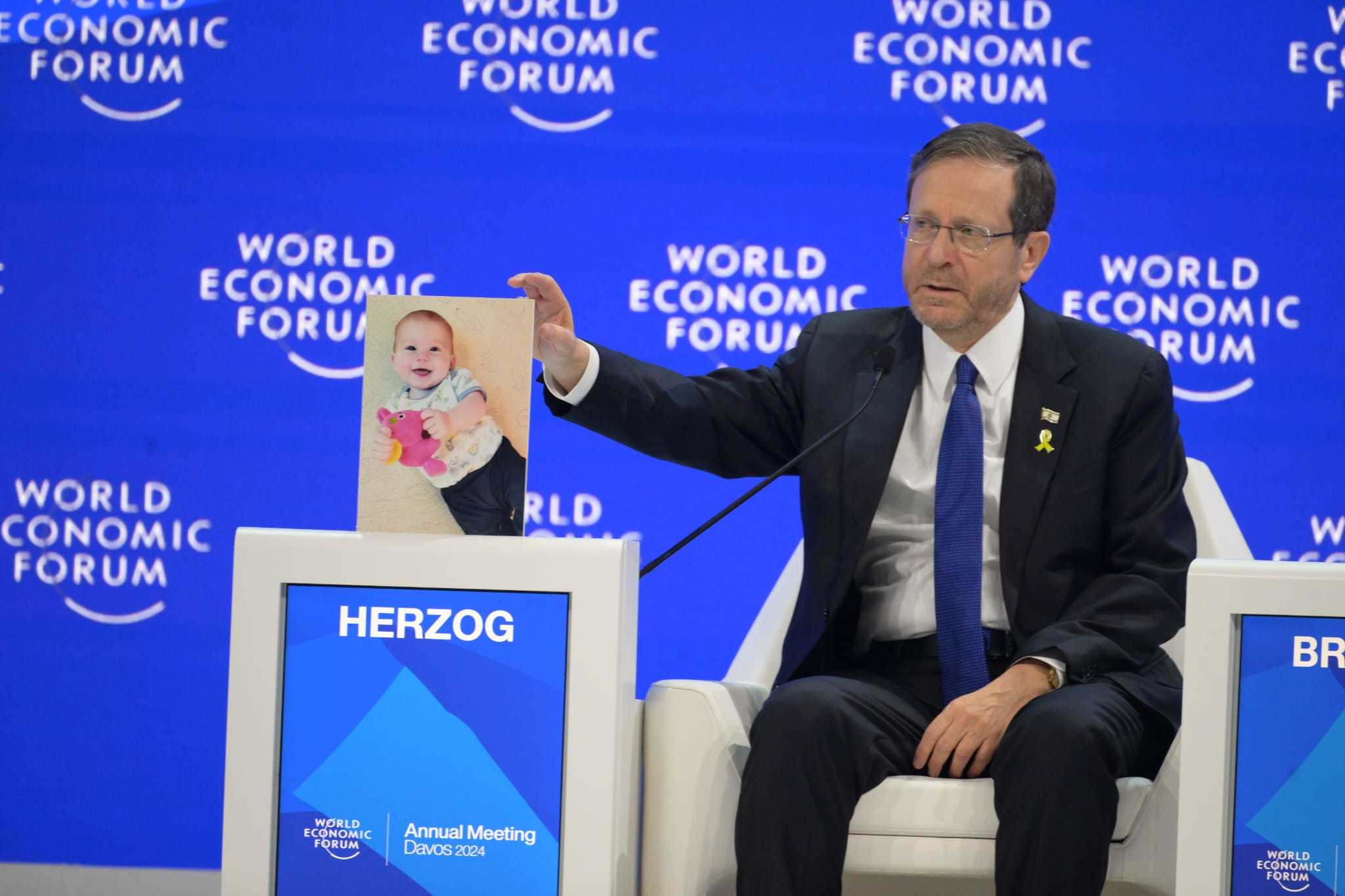
Israeli President Isaac Herzog displaying a picture of Kfir Bibas on his birthday during the World Economic Forum – January 2024

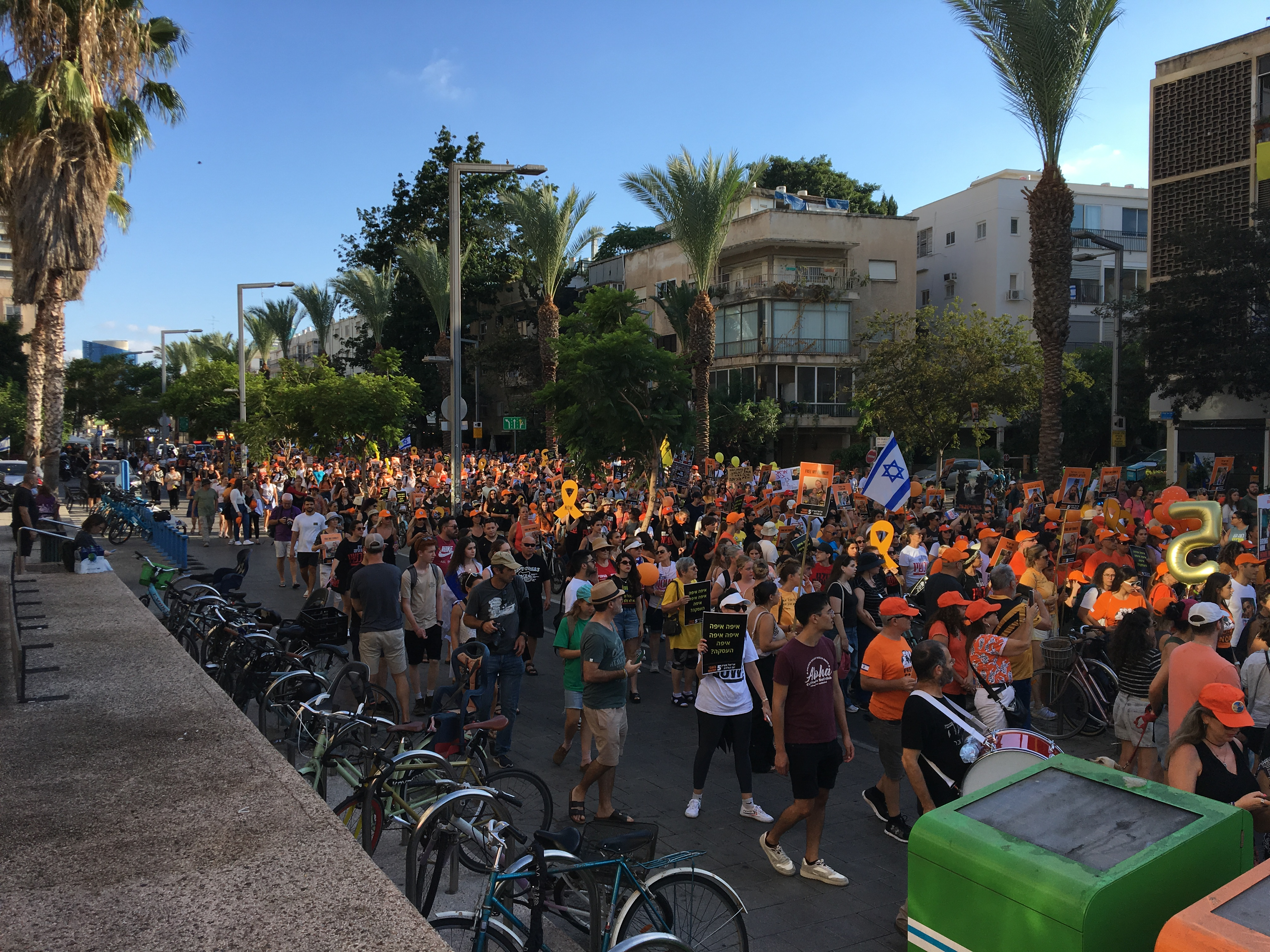
A march commemorating Ariel Bibas's 5th birthday – August 2024 (Note: The autopsy performed after the release of his body showed that he most likely did not survive to celebrate his fifth birthday.)

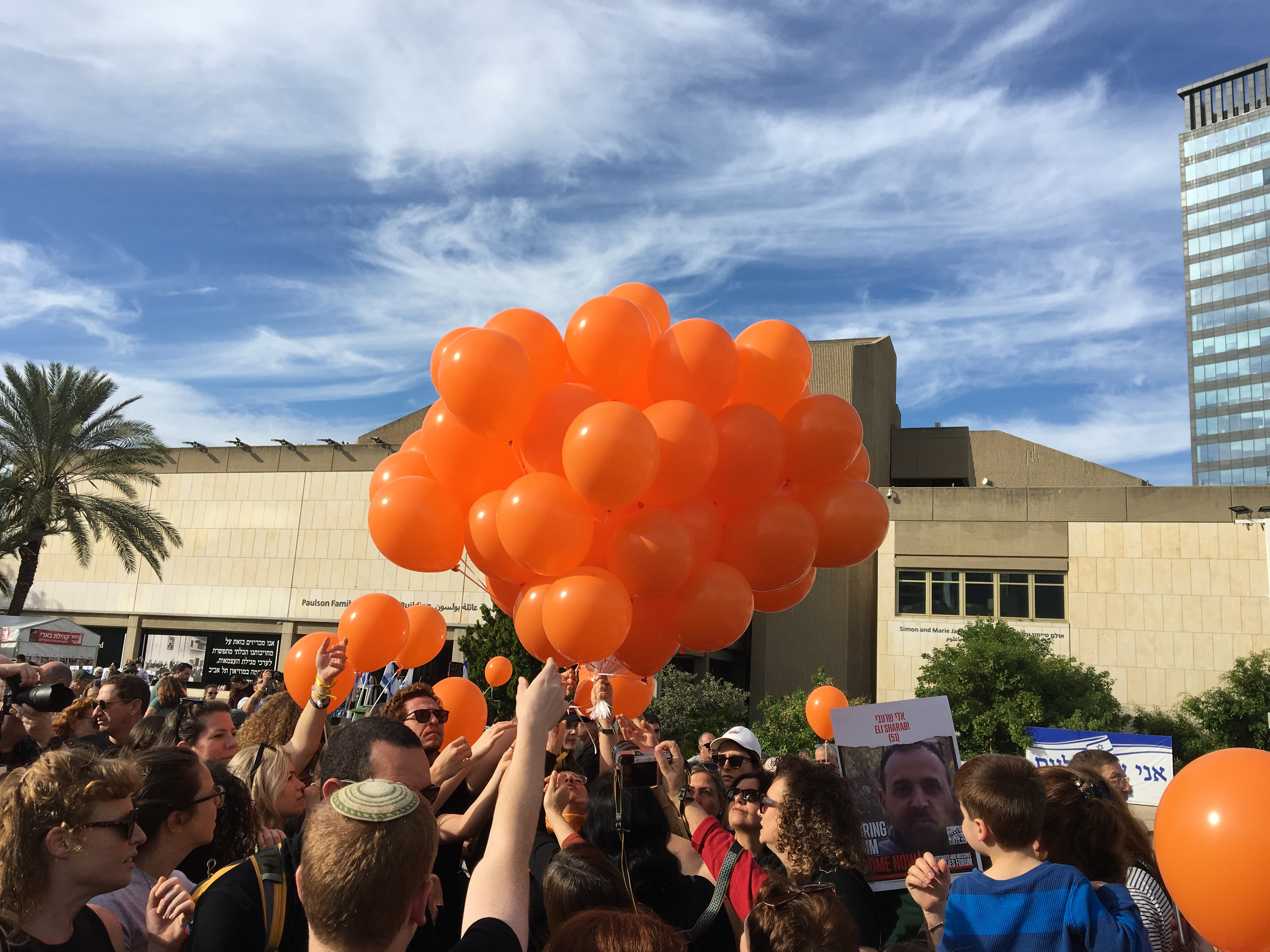
Release of orange balloons from Hostages Square
– December 2023

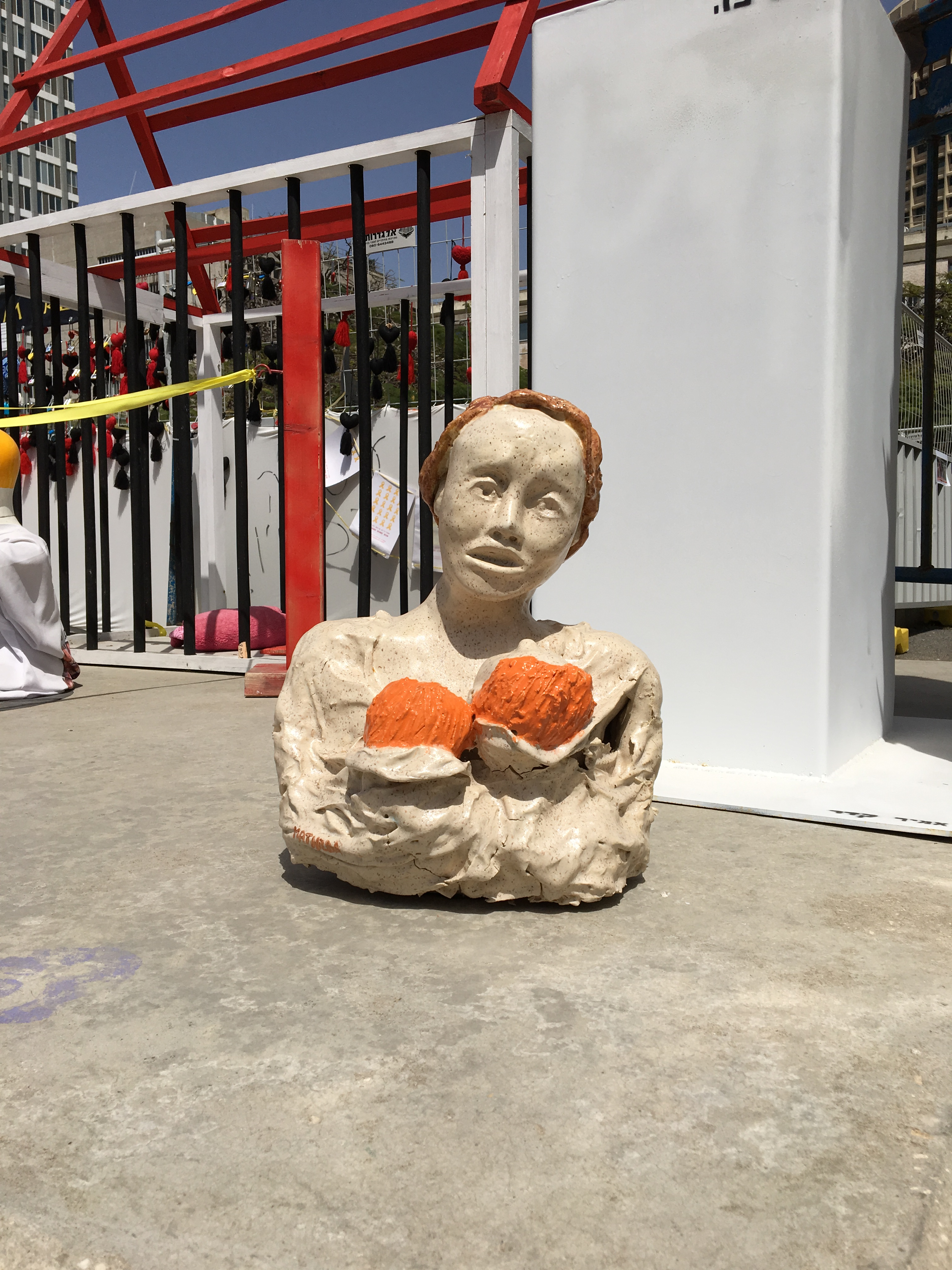
A sculpture recreation of the kidnapping

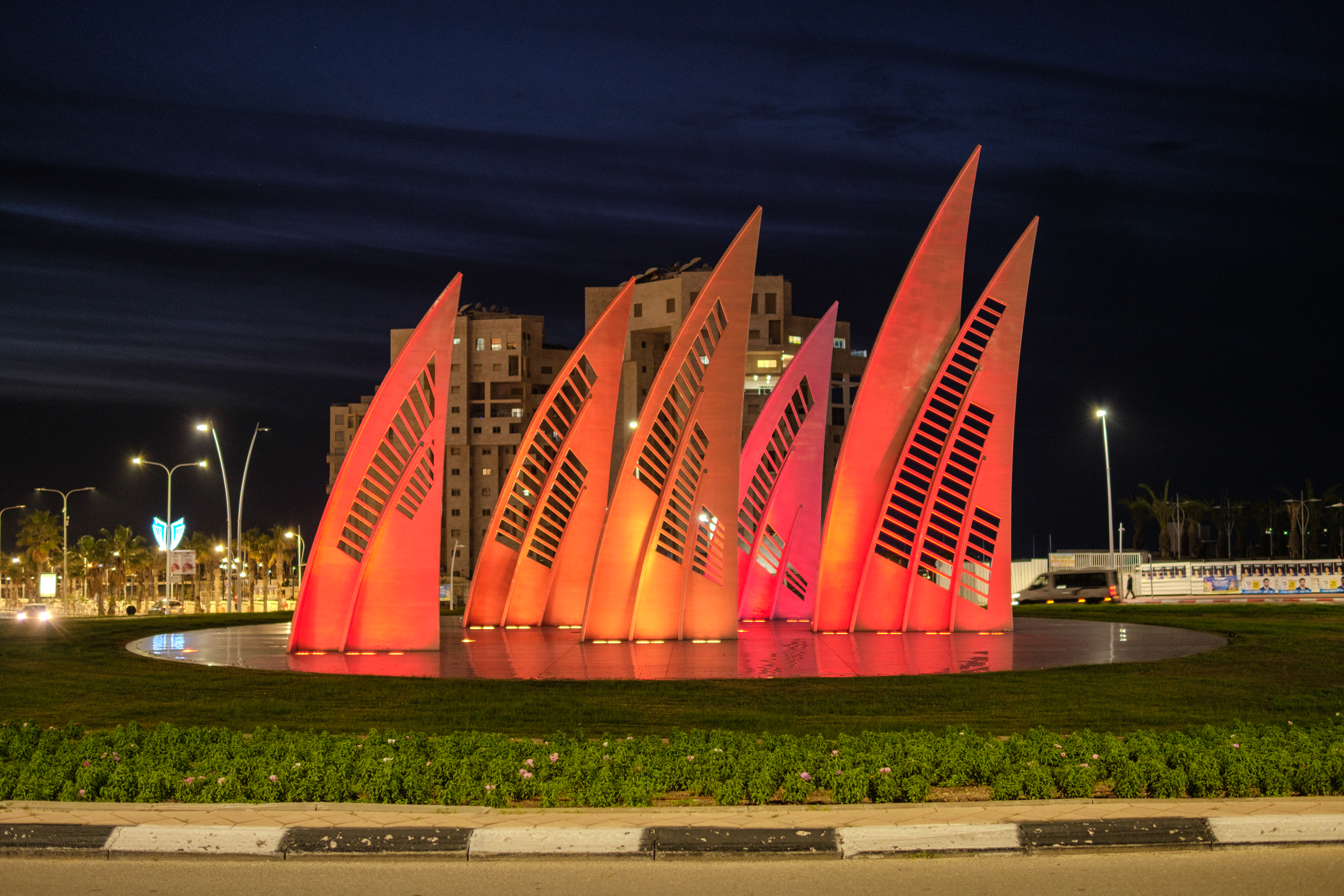
A public sculpture in Ashdod lit up in Orange for Kfir Bibas's first birthday (Note: The autopsy performed after the release of his body showed that he most likely did not survive to celebrate his first birthday.) (Note: For a daylight view of the sculpture, see this image. For the normal illumination of the sculpture at night, see this image)

On 7 October 2023, the deputy chief of Hamas, Saleh al-Arouri, said that Palestinians had abducted Israelis so they could force Israel to release thousands of Palestinians (including 200 women and children) in Israeli custody. On 9 October, Hamas offered to release all civilian hostages in exchange for Israeli army not entering Gaza, but the Israeli government rejected the offer. On 17 October 2023, a Hamas official said it would release all civilian (but not military) hostages in exchange for Israel ending the bombing of the Gaza Strip. On 19 October, Human Rights Watch criticized Hamas for conditioning the release of Israelis upon Israel's release of Palestinians, arguing "civilians, including children ... should never be treated as bargaining chips."

On 22 November 2023, Israel agreed to release 150 Palestinian women and children held in Israeli prisons, in exchange for Hamas agreeing to release 50 Israeli women and children. Shiri Bibas and her children were expected to be released, but were not released. On 29 November, Hamas' armed wing, the Al Qassam Brigades, claimed that Shiri Bibas and her children had been killed in the Israeli bombing of Gaza. Israel said that Hamas's claims were unverified and could be part of their psychological warfare.

On 30 November 2023, Hamas offered to release Yarden Bibas along with the bodies of his wife and sons. This offer was confirmed by Israeli officials and Arab diplomats. Israel refused, demanding that living female hostages be returned before the dead bodies. On the same day, Hamas also claimed that Shiri, Ariel and Kfir Bibas had been killed by Israeli airstrikes before the truce went into effect. The IDF responded that "Hamas is wholly responsible for the security of all hostages".

A cousin of the Bibas family requested to speak with US President Joe Biden, Egyptian President Abdel Fattah El-Sisi and Qatar's Emir Tamim bin Hamad Al Thani, to petition them for help in the release of the family. He also mentioned that they were working with the Argentinian government to help petition for the release of the family. In early December 2023 per Foreign Minister Eli Cohen, all Israeli embassies and consulates either lit their buildings in orange or displayed images of the family. The display was supposed to coincide with the first lighting of Hanukkah candles.

Around Kfir Bibas's first birthday in January 2024, family members celebrated his (18 January) birthday and raised awareness for the family still reportedly held as hostages. Hundreds of people gathered at the Hostages Square in Tel Aviv to celebrate Kfir Bibas and his family with a performance by Israeli children's music stars and wore orange to symbolize the two children's hair. Kfir Bibas's picture was also displayed next to Israeli President Isaac Herzog while he spoke at the World Economic Forum that same week. On 19 February, the Israeli military released a video which purportedly showed members of the Bibas family in the Khan Younis area.

In August 2024, during the Redhead Days Festival in Tilburg, Netherlands, which is known for celebrating people with auburn hair, members of the Bibas family urged participants to spotlight the Bibas children and to raise awareness about their continued time as hostages.

== Release and return of bodies ==
On 28 January 2025, a group supporting the family asked for the public to wear orange in honor of the family. Israeli officials asked on 29 January that Hamas provide more information on the condition of Shiri Bibas and the two children.

=== Release of Yarden Bibas ===
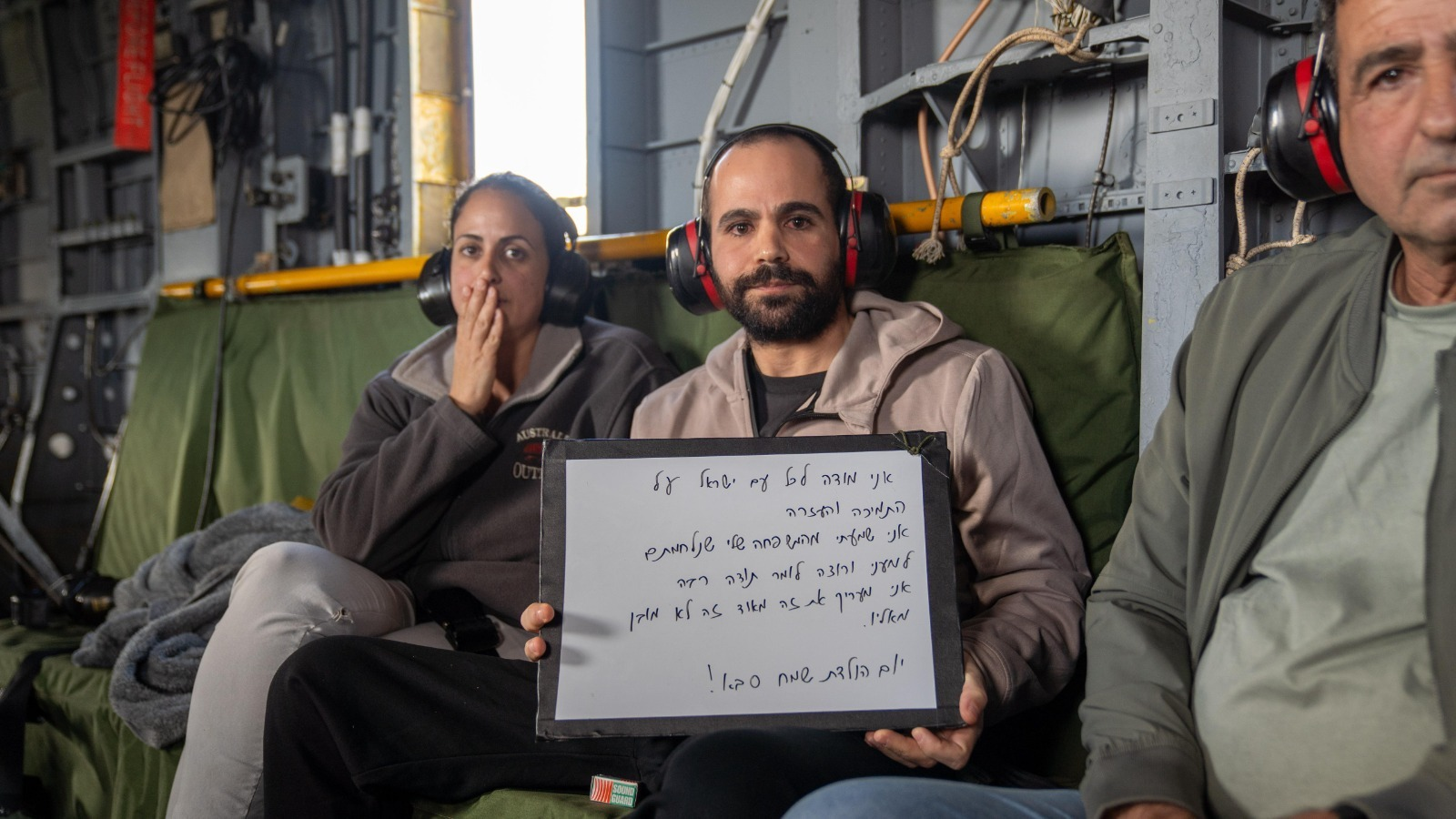
Yarden Bibas on the helicopter after being released by Hamas from captivity in Gaza (Note: Translation of message on whiteboard: "I thank all the People of Israel for their support and help. I heard from my family that you fought for me, and want to say many thanks. I deeply appreciate it. It's not self-evident. Happy birthday, Grandpa!") – February 2025

Hamas released Yarden Bibas on 1 February, as part of the fourth round of releases in the January 2025 Gaza war ceasefire agreement. He had spent 484 days in captivity. He had lost 15 kilograms (33 lb) since his abduction. He told Israeli authorities that he had been starved and not given any food on some days. He reported that he had mostly been held in isolation in an underground cell, rarely seeing sunlight. He was allowed to meet other hostages only during meals.

After Yarden Bibas's release, the Bibas family issued a statement saying that "a quarter of our heart has returned... but the home remains incomplete". His family thanked the Israeli public for its support and concern, saying that although he had lost a significant amount of weight, he was in good spirits and physically stable.

=== Return of the bodies of Shiri, Ariel, and Kfir Bibas ===
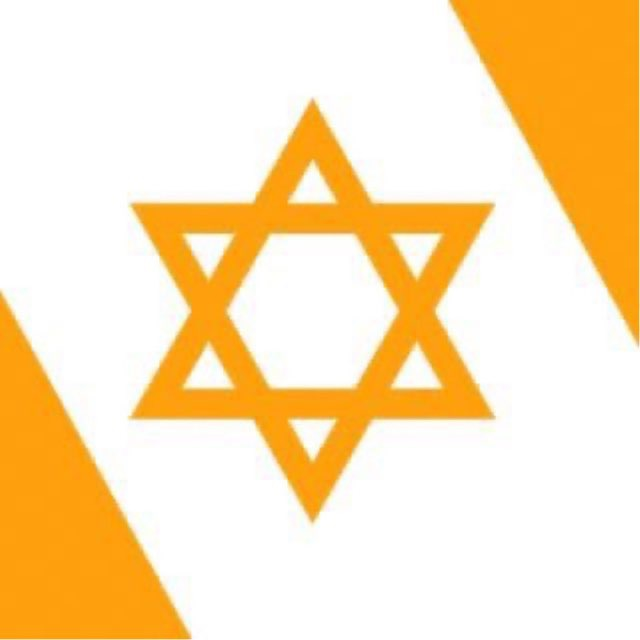
The Flag of Israel colored in orange uploaded to the official Twitter account of the State of Israel on the day of the return of their bodies

The status of Shiri, Ariel, and Kfir Bibas was unclear at the time of Yarden Bibas's release, although they had not been included in earlier releases that prioritized living women and children. On 18 February, a Hamas spokesperson announced that the bodies of four hostages, including the remaining members of the Bibas family, would be released on 20 February, as part of the seventh round of the ceasefire and prisoner exchange agreement.

On 20 February, Hamas released four bodies, reported to be of Shiri, Ariel, and Kfir Bibas, and a fourth hostage, Oded Lifshitz, who had also been kidnapped during the Nir Oz attack. The handover was performed as a two-step process, with the first step being a handover of coffins from Hamas to the Red Cross, and the second involving a handover from the Red Cross to the IDF. In the first step, the four coffins were brought to a stage in Khan Yunis, wrapped in black with labels bearing the deceased family members' names and pictures. They were placed before a poster that portrayed Israeli prime minister Benjamin Netanyahu as a vampire, with the four deceased superimposed. The poster blamed Netanyahu and Israel for their deaths. In the second step, a rabbi conducted a ceremony upon receipt of the coffins and they were transported into Israel draped in Israeli flags. Israeli citizens lined the roads near the Gaza border to watch the convoy and pay their respects, as well as gathering in Hostages Square.

Israel screened the coffins through metal detectors to ensure they were not booby-trapped. Upon opening the coffins, investigators reportedly discovered Hamas propaganda, which Israel considered "a desecration of the sanctity of the dead". Israel filed a complaint with Egypt, Qatar and the United States, who helped negotiate the ceasefire agreement between Israel and Hamas. The four bodies were taken to the Abu Kabir Forensic Institute for identification. Israel forensically confirmed the bodies of Ariel and Kfir Bibas and Lifshitz, but it also confirmed that the fourth body did not match Shiri Bibas or any other Israeli hostage held by Hamas. Netanyahu accused Hamas of violating the ceasefire and prisoner exchange agreement by returning a body that was not that of Shiri Bibas. Hamas acknowledged the possibility of a mistake, adding that corpses had been "mixed up" due to Israeli bombings. Hamas acknowledged "seriousness and full commitment to all our obligations" and said it remained committed to compliance. It asked Israel to return the body of the Palestinian woman that had been inside the coffin marked as Shiri Bibas. It handed over Shiri Bibas's remains separately the following day.

The Bibas children were the last Israeli children held by Hamas, and Shiri Bibas was the last Israeli woman held by Hamas whose death had not been confirmed by Israel. (Note: The bodies of three other women were still held by Hamas at the time that Shiri's body was returned to Israel: Judith Weinstein, Ofra Keidar, and Inbar Hayman. Israel had declared that Weinstein and Keidar died on the day of their abduction, with Hayman having died in captivity.)

==== Cause of death ====
Hamas and Israel have made conflicting claims about the deaths of Shiri Bibas and her children. Hamas claims that they were killed in an Israeli airstrike, while Israel claims they were murdered with bare hands by Hamas. IDF spokesperson Daniel Hagari stated: "The terrorists did not shoot the two young boys — they killed them with their bare hands. Afterward, they committed horrific acts to cover up these atrocities.” Neither side has publicly provided any evidence to substantiate their claims, although Israel said that it had shared evidence with its international partners.

Israeli politician Benny Gantz said in June 2024 that Israel was aware then of the fate of the Bibas family and the public would be informed "when things come to fruition." Following the return of the remains, Israel stated that a forensic analysis showed that Ariel and Kfir Bibas had been killed with "bare hands" in November 2023. Israel stated that Shiri Bibas had been "brutally murdered" together with her children with Shiri being killed first and that the corpses had been mutilated to make it appear as if they died in a bombing. Netanyahu described the mutilation as a crushing of "their tiny skulls with unspeakable cruelty". Israel stated that it had shared evidence of these claims with its international partners, but it did not publicly release the evidence. Hamas described the Israeli claims as "baseless lies".

Ofri Bibas Levy, sister of Yarden Bibas, criticized Netanyahu and other government officials for publicly sharing graphic details from the autopsy report. In a social media post on 25 February, the day before the funeral of her sister-in-law and nephews, she told Netanyahu to "shut up," calling his statements "outright abuse of a family that has already been enduring hell for 16 months." The Bibas family sent a cease-and-desist letter to Israeli government officials, demanding that they stop publicly disclosing details of the deaths beyond those already approved by Yarden Bibas.

=== Funeral of Shiri, Ariel, and Kfir Bibas ===
Israel during the funeral

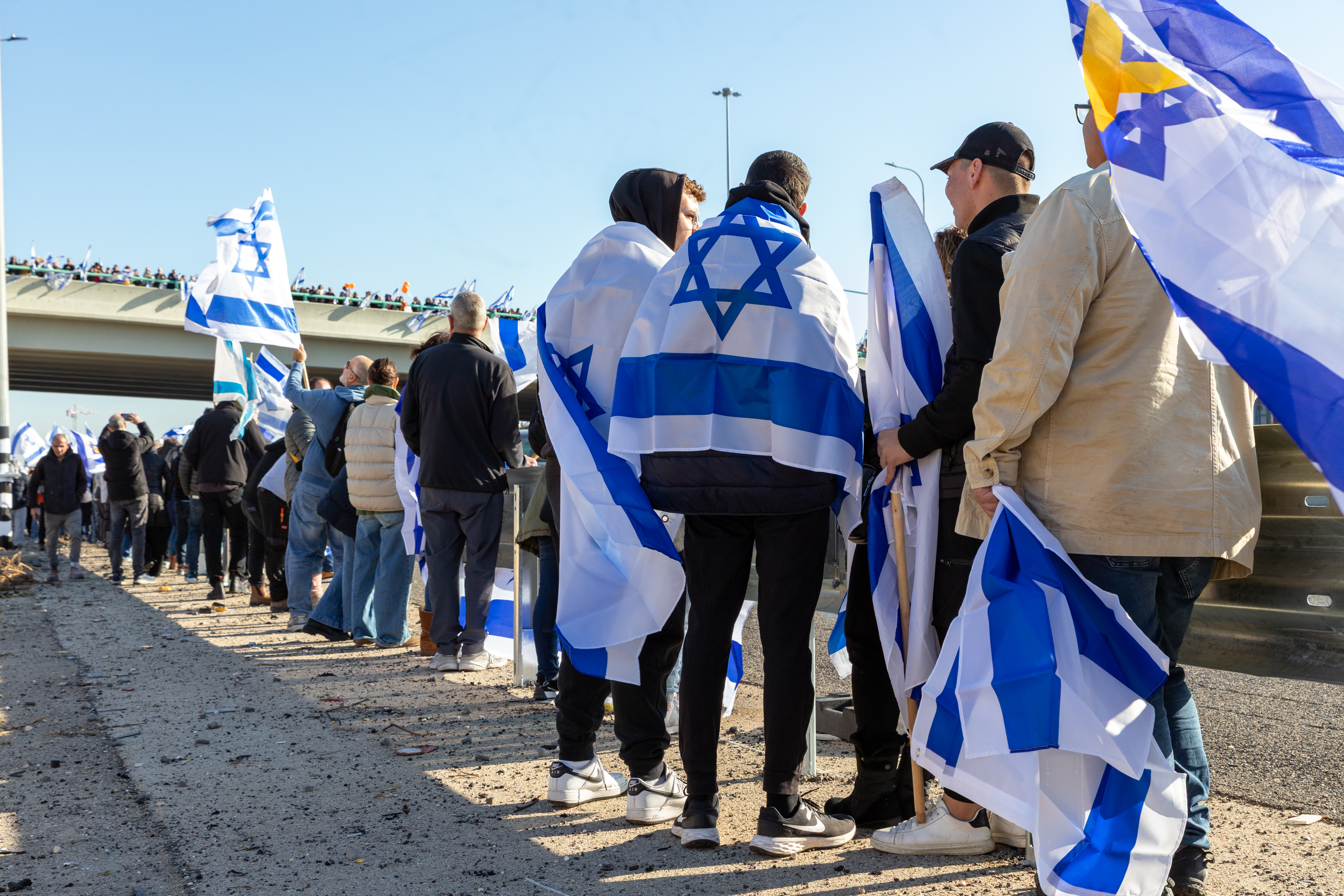
Israelis lining the route of the funeral procession

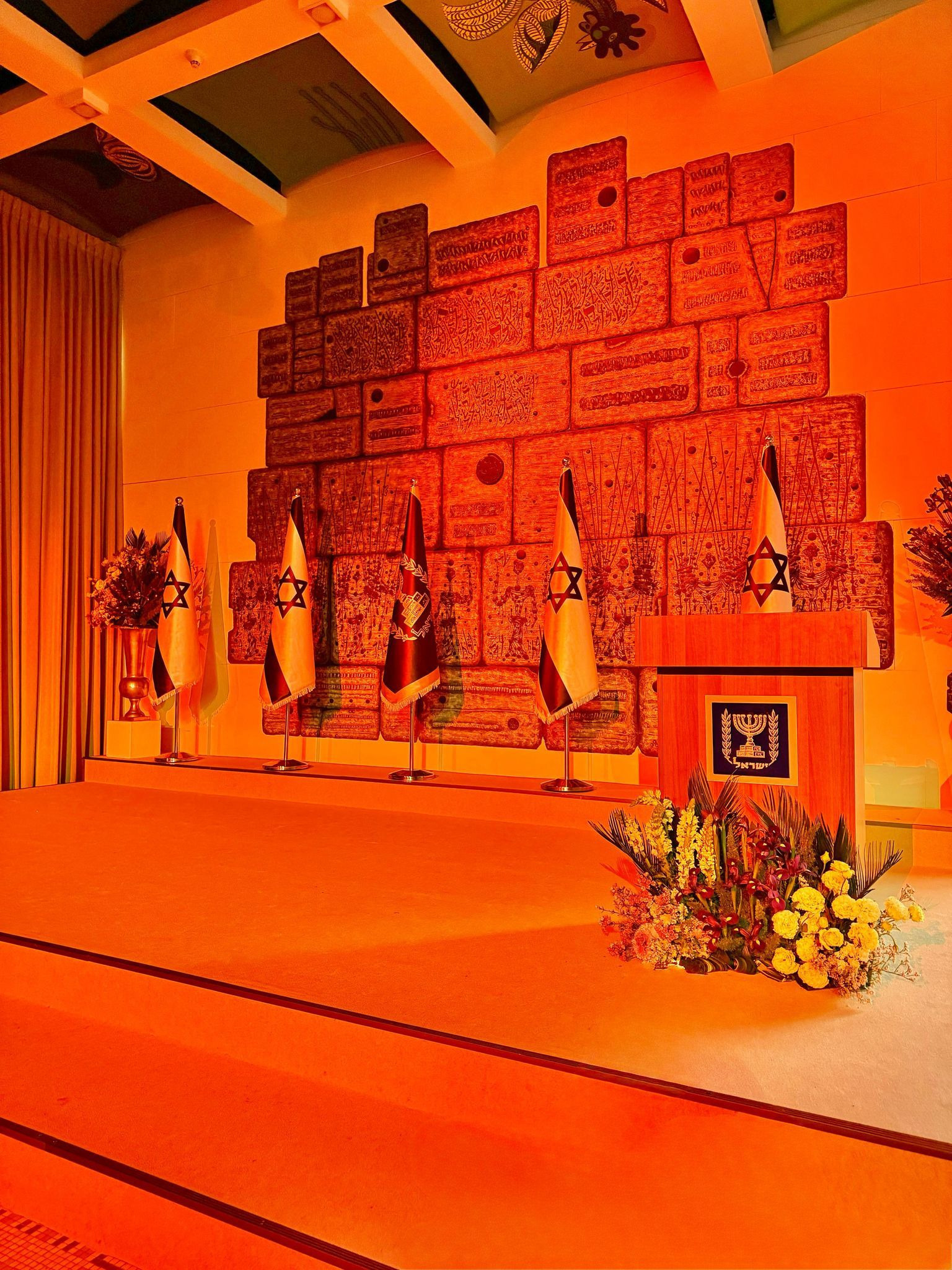
Hall at Beit HaNassi lit up in orange during the funeral procession (Note: For the artwork on the wall under normal illumination, see this image)

The funeral of Shiri, Ariel, and Kfir Bibas took place on 26 February 2025. Thousands of Israelis lined the route of the funeral procession, which began at a funeral home in Rishon LeZion in central Israel and ended at the regional cemetery in Tzohar in southern Israel, near the kibbutz where the Bibas family lived. Eulogies were broadcast on Israeli television, streamed over the Internet, and shown on large screens in Tel Aviv's Hostages Square. In a private ceremony, Shiri, Ariel, and Kfir Bibas were buried in a single casket. They were laid to rest alongside Shiri Bibas's parents.

On the day of the funeral, monuments around the world—including the Empire State Building, the Brandenburg Gate, and the Chain Bridge in Budapest—were illuminated in orange as a tribute to the deceased.

=== Public responses ===
Following the release of the bodies of Ariel and Kfir, Isaac Herzog, the President of Israel, issued a statement saying that the "hearts of an entire nation line in tatters" and spoke directly to the deceased stating that he bowed his head and asked for forgiveness in not protecting them or bringing them home safe.

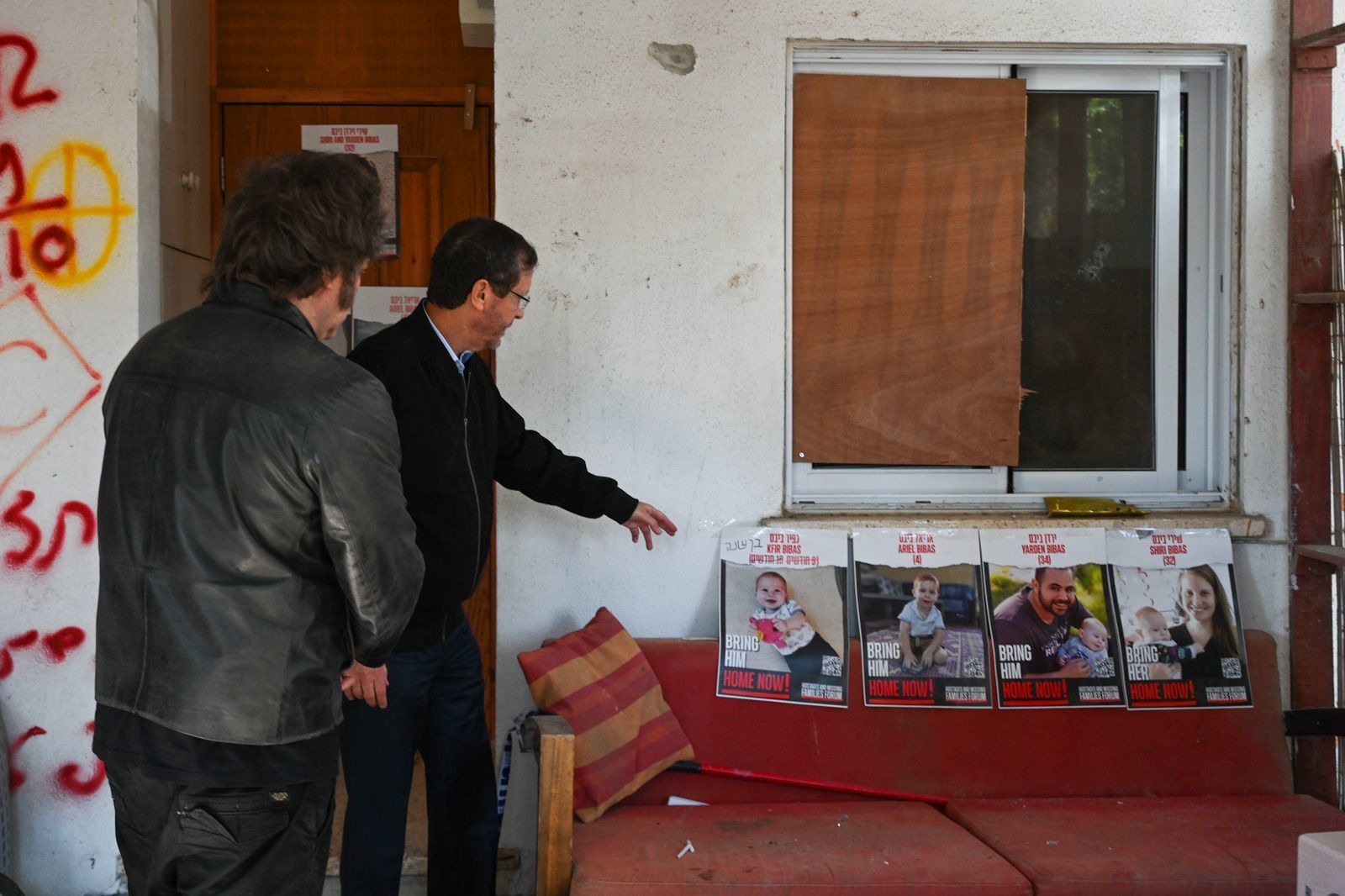
President of Israel Isaac Herzog and President of Argentina Javier Milei at a visit to the Bibas Family house in Nir Oz, February 2024

Javier Milei, the President of Argentina, declared two days of national mourning beginning on 20 February following the return of the bodies, as the Bibas children held Argentine citizenship. Sabrina Ajmechet, President of the Argentinian Commission for Human Rights, wrote: "Two Argentinian babies assassinated because of Hamas terrorism. I hope that never again, after this, I have to hear that what happens in Israel and Gaza is not our concern, of all Argentines".

Buenos Aires council member Yamil Santoro proposed renaming "Palestine Street" to "Bibas Family Street". President Milei expressed support for the proposal, but others suggested renaming a park, rather than Palestine Street, as a tribute to the Bibas family.

The Arab-Israeli group Atidna condemned Hamas following the alleged murders of Shiri Bibas and her two children, describing the crime as "an act of barbarism that has no justification". The group called on Arab-Israeli political leaders to denounce terrorism, emphasizing, "At such a crucial moment, silence is not an option—our duty as leaders and as a society is to speak out clearly and firmly against murder and terror". It declared that it would participate in the Bibas family funeral procession, stating, "We will declare in one united voice: No to terror, no to murder, yes to life and humanity".

During pro-Netanyahu Channel 14's reporting on the Bibas family's funeral, an interviewee stated that "This is a day of history repeating itself, Gush Katif, children praying in synagogues, all in orange shirts. We're back to that: everything's orange, orange balloons, little kids wearing orange who don't know what [the color] means"; Keti Shitrit, a member of the Knesset for the ruling Likud, stated on a Channel 14 panel show that "We all remember Gush Katif's orange ribbon, orange clothing... note the parallel", while also claiming that the Bibas' release occurred on the Hebrew calendar anniversary of the 2005 Israeli disengagement from the Gaza Strip.

[W]e are appalled and horrified by their [Hamas's] desecration of the remains of Shiri Bibas. This is a gruesome scene, and we join the people of Israel in mourning the loss of several members of the Bibas family. Kfir was not even a year old when he was taken, along with his four-year-old brother Ariel. They were cruelly murdered by Hamas.

— Dorothy Shea, United States Chargé d'Affaires ad interim to the United Nations, 25 February 2025 remarks delivered to the UN Security Council Briefing

On 25 February 2025, during a United Nations Security Council address, Dorothy Shea, the acting ambassador of the United States to the United Nations, condemned Hamas for murdering Shiri Bibas and her children and mishandling Shiri Bibas's body.

In response to a question about whether Hamas was responsible for the deaths of the children, Rima Hassan, a French Member of the European Parliament, responded "would there have been Hamas and, in particular, the attacks of the 7th, if there had not been an illegal occupation and an illegal blockade imposed on the Gaza Strip for decades?", suggesting that those were the reasons for the deaths.

On April 4, 2025, the Academy of the Hebrew Language announced that it was changing the official Hebrew name of the butterfly species Melitaea ornata from Kitmit Yerushalayim (Orange Jerusalem) to Kitmit Ariel (Orange Ariel) in memory of Ariel Bibas. Ariel is also one of the biblical names of Jerusalem.

== Retaliation by Israel ==
Jihad Kamal Salem Najjar, who was assassinated on August 10, 2025, in the presence of an injured Yarden Bibas during Bibas's kidnapping on October 7, 2023

In April 2025, Israel announced that it had found Muhammad Hassan Muhammad Awad, a senior member of the Mujahideen Brigades, in the northern part of the Gaza Strip, and killed him in an airstrike. According to Israel, Awad was responsible for the kidnapping of Shiri and her two children, along with the abduction of a couple of other residents of Kibbutz Nir Oz and several Thai nationals who were working in the Kibbutz. Israel also said that Awad was "likely involved" in the death of Shiri and her two children.

In June 2025, Israel announced that it had killed As'ad Abu Shari'a, the leader of the Mujahideen Brigades, in a strike in the Sabra neighborhood of Gaza City. According to Israel, Abu Sharia was at Kibbutz Nir Oz on the day of the kidnapping, and was “directly involved” in the abduction of Shiri and her children.

On August 10, 2025, an Israeli military strike killed Jihad Kamal Salem Najjar, who had been photographed participating in the kidnapping of Yarden Bibas. The IDF and Shin Bet jointly confirmed Najjar's death on August 19. Yarden Bibas issued a public statement thanking Israeli security forces for their work, and noted that Najjar "will no longer be able to harm anyone".

== See also ==
- Children in the Israeli–Palestinian conflict
- Gaza war hostage crisis
- Noa Argamani
- List of kidnappings
- Women in the Gaza war
