= Mujahideen Brigades =

Palestinian paramilitary organization

- كتائب المجاهدين; Kataeb al-Mujahideen
- Founders: Omar Attia Abu Sharia X (Note: Usually shortened to Omar Abu Sharia, also spelled "Omar Abu Shari'a".); Kunya: Abu Hafs.
- Spokesperson: Abu Bilal.
- Founded: 2006
- Split from: (Fatah) Al-Aqsa Martyrs' Brigades
- Allegiance: Palestine; Palestinian Joint Operations Room
- Headquarters: Khan Younis
- Active regions: Palestinian Territories; West Bank; Gaza Strip
- Ideology: Islamism; Palestinian nationalism Anti-Zionism
- Status: Active
- Part of: Palestinian Mujahideen Movement (political wing); (Palestine) Palestinian Joint Operations Room
- Website: www.km-pal.ps

Mujahideen Brigades (Note: Other translations and transliterations: Hebrew: לוחמי הקודש, romanized: Lohmi Hakodsh, lit. 'Holy Warriors'. (Note: Translation of "Mujahideen".); Hebrew: גדודי לוחמי הקודש, romanized: Gdudi Lohmi Hakodsh, lit. 'Holy Warriors Brigades'. (Note: Hebrew translation of "Mujahideen" and "Kataeb".); Hebrew: גדודי אל-מוג'אהדין, romanized: Gdudi al‑Mujahideen. (Note: Hebrew transliteration of the Arabic of "Kataeb".).; Hebrew: כתאיב אל-מוג'אהדין, romanized: Kataeb al‑Mujahideen. (Note: Hebrew transliteration of the Arabic name.); Al-Mujahideen Brigades.; Kataeb Al-Mujahidin.; Kataib Mujahideen.; Persian: گردان های مجاهدین, lit. 'Mojahedin Battalions'. (Note: Persian translation of "Kataeb", Persian: گردان های, lit. 'Battalions'.)) (Arabic: كتائب المجاهدين, romanized: Kataeb al-Mujahideen) is an armed wing of the Palestinian Mujahideen Movement (Arabic: حركة المجاهدين الفلسطينية, romanized: Harakat al-Mujāhidīn al-Filastīnīa). The brigades operate in the Palestinian territories of the Gaza Strip and The West Bank The Palestinian Mujahideen Movement and Mujahideen Brigades split from the Fatah movement, the military wing originating from the Martyr Jamal Al-Omari Brigade of the Al-Aqsa Martyrs' Brigades. The movement was founded in 2001 and led by founder Omar Abu Sharia, at the beginning of the Al-Aqsa Intifada.

The Mujahideen Brigades operate independently of Hamas but collaborates closely with militants from Palestinian Islamic Jihad's armed wing, Saraya Al Quds.

== Political and militant wings ==
The political wing is the Palestinian Mujahideen Movement (Arabic: حركة المجاهدين الفلسطينية, romanized: Haraka al-Mujahidīn al-FilisTīnīa). (Note: The movement often use the unusual Romanization "mojahdeen" for themselves.) It is one of the most prominent Islamic factions among Palestinian militants in the Gaza Strip and the West Bank.

The Mujahideen Brigades are the militant wing. The Brigades operate independently of Hamas but collaborates closely with militants from Palestinian Islamic Jihad's armed wing, Saraya Al Quds.

=== Martyrs of the Occupied Interior ===
The Palestinian Mujahideen Movement has another militant division, whom they call the "Martyrs of the Occupied Interior" (Note: Arabic: شهداء الداخل المحتل Transliteration: Shuhadā' ad-Dākhil al-Muhtali) unit, or "Dāham". The unit focuses on attacks in Israel, inside the Green Line. The FDD's Long War Journal describes the group as being active in the West Bank.

The Martyrs of the Occupied Interior claimed responsibility for the 14 July 2024 vehicular ramming attack near the Tzrifin military base, which resulted in the injury of four IDF soldiers, one of whom later died of his injuries. The perpetrator, 27-year-old Mohammed Shehab was shot dead at the scene.

=== Rightly Guided Caliphs group ===
The Mujahideen Brigades often promote or endorse a Palestinian religious group called the "Rightly Guided Caliphs" (Note: Arabic: مجمع الخلفاء الراشدين الدعوي Transliteration: Mujmae al-Khulafā' al-Rāshidīn al-Duewī)

== History ==
The organization was founded by Omar Abu Sharia, in 2006, or in 2001 at the beginning of the Second Intifada.

The Mujahideen Brigades – and their political wing the Palestinian Mujahideen Movement – began as a break-away faction of the Fatah movement. Before the schism, the Mujahideen Brigades were known as the Martyr Jamal Al-Amari Brigade and they were part of Fatah's Al-Aqsa Martyrs Brigades. (Note: The Fatah Party officially deny a continued convention to their armed wing, as of 2007.) As they grew they changed their name from Mujahideen Battalion to the Mujahideen Brigades.

== Leadership ==
Leaders of the Mujahideen Brigades
No.	Name	Took office	Left office	Cause of death
1.	Omar Abu Sharia	2006	April 2007	Assassinated by an air strike on the car he was in on 14 October 2006.
2.	As'ad Abu Shari'a	24 April 2007	7 June 2025	Assassinated by an Israeli Airstrike in 2025.
3.	Ali Saadi Wasfi al-Agha	7 June 2025	20 june 2025	Assassinated by an Israeli Airstrike in 2025.
4.	Musbah Salim Musbah Dayyah	20 June 2025	3 September 2025	Assassinated by an Israeli Airstrike in 2025.
5.	Vacant			

According to local sources, the leaders and founders of the Palestinian Mujahideen Movement are from the Al-Hasayna and Abu Sharia families in Gaza, and have Bedouin roots. On 23 November 2023 the secretary general of the Mujahedeen Movement, Asaad Abu Sharia, stated that numerous members of his immediate and extended family had been killed in airstrikes. The group said this included their leader's wife and children, his older brother Bassam Attia Abu Sharia, and multiple members of the leader's extended family. They also said the leader's family had been previously targeted at the beginning of the war, killing his sister and three generations of her family.

== Militant activity ==
The Mujahideen Brigades have claimed responsibility for direct fights against Israel and are known to operate in cooperation with other Palestinian militant groups.

The Mujahideen Brigades' primary role is engaging in armed guerrilla warfare against Israel, focusing on both direct military confrontations and rocket fire. Their operations have been part of the larger conflict between Israel and Palestinian militant groups. They conduct military training and maneuvers in the Gaza Strip. These drills and training are aimed at enhancing their fighters' combat skills and simulating offensive operations against Israeli targets.

Over the years, the movement became a member of the Hamas-led government in Gaza and cooperated with it in operations, supplying weapons and training.

=== 2012 hostage taking plans ===
In 2012, a cell of the movement from Hebron and the Gaza Strip planned to kidnap an Israeli citizen, as a bargaining chip for the release of members of the movement imprisoned in Israel.

Mujahideen Brigades member Shehadeh Abu al-Qiaan seen in an IDF uniform shortly after enlisting.

=== 2021 Israel–Palestine crisis ===
The Mujahideen Brigades took part in the 2021 Israel–Palestine crisis.

=== 2022 infiltration of IDF ===
In May 2022, 25-year-old Shehadeh Abu al-Qiaan, a Negev Bedouin from Hura, and an Israeli citizen, enlisted in the IDF, with the intention of sending intelligence to the Mujahideen Brigades. al-Qiaan was reportedly motivated by the demolition of his family home by Israeli authorities in 2019. While in the IDF, al-Qiaan gathered internal military intelligence, photographed various locations, and stole weaponry. Furthermore, al-Qiaan provided the Mujahideen Brigades with the names, photos, and phone numbers of Bedouin soldiers in the IDF. al-Qiaan was arrested on 30 May 2022 by the Shin Bet, and an indictment was filed, accusing al-Qiaan of multiple offenses, including membership in a terrorist organisation.

== Gaza war ==
The Mujahideen Brigades participated in the Gaza war, attacking Israeli forces during the October 7th attacks, the Gaza Strip, and the West Bank. They joined the 7 October 2023 attacks initiated by Hamas' Al-Qassam Brigades military wing. During October 7th, the Mujahideen Brigades kidnapped three members of the Bibas family, a fourth Bibas family member was separately captured by Hamas' militants.

=== Media coverage ===
The Mujahideen Brigades were largely ignored by the media for the first few months of the Gaza war, until their videos were broadcast by Arabic language news channels like Al Jazeera Live and Al Araby TV in early 2024. Some propaganda videos from the Mujahideen Brigades used a blue triangle to highlight targets.

=== Family casualties ===
The leaders and founders of the Palestinian Mujahideen Movement are from the Al-Hasayna and Abu Sharia families in Gaza, and have Bedouin roots. On 23 November 2023, the homes of the Al-Hasayna and Abu Sharia families were destroyed in an airstrike, that allegedly killed 93 Palestinians. Neither side acknowledged a possible target, and only civilians casualties were reported. On 23 November 2023 the secretary general of the Mujahedeen Movement, Asaad Abu Sharia, stated that numerous members of his immediate and extended family had been killed in airstrikes. The group said this included their leader's wife and children, his older brother Bassam Attia Abu Sharia, and multiple members of the leader's extended family. They also said the leader's family had been previously targeted at the beginning of the war, killing his sister and three generations of her family.

=== Kidnapping of the Bibas family ===
The Mujahideen Brigades were holding three members of the Bibas family hostage in Khan Yunis. The group holding the Bibas family was shown to be the Mujahideen Brigades based on CCTV footage found in Khan Younis. The Mujahedeen Brigades explicitly claimed responsibility for the original kidnapping of the mother and two children from the Bibas family. Yarden Bibas was captured separately by Hamas militants. The family had a gun in the house for self defense, but it was inadequate against heavily armed militants from multiple factions.

Shiri Bibas and her two young children, Ariel and Kfir, were abducted from Kibbutz Nir Oz on 7 October 2023. Kfir was less than one year old at the time and the youngest hostage held by Gaza's militant factions. The IDF claimed they were kidnapped by Hamas, but then said were held by "another group" after they were excluded from the 2023 Israeli–Palestinian prisoner exchange in November 2023. Some sources claim "civilians" joined the attack at Nir Oz.

In November 2023, Mujahideen Brigades stated on social media that the Bibas family was in their custody. Then on 29 November, during hostage negotiations, Hamas claimed Shiri Bibas and her children had been killed in an Israeli air strike while in captivity. In November 2023 the IDF said they were not sure if the trio were being held by Hamas. On 19 February, the IDF presented a video showing Shiri and the children still alive several days after the abduction. The video was apparently filmed in southern Gaza. Hamas's Qassam Brigades published a video of Yarden Bibas being told his family had been killed. Hamas offered to hand over the three bodies but Israel were "unresponsive".

The statements by the Mujahideen Brigades themselves were mostly ignored outside of the Israel and the Arab world, but a later IDF announcement got international attention in February 2024. The group holding the Bibas family was confirmed to be the Mujahideen Brigades based on CCTV footage found in Khan Younis. Hamas had never released photos or other indirect evidence, but in November 2023, Hamas offered to release the three bodies and still living Yarden Bibas on compassionate grounds, but Israel had refused the offer. Israel described the offer as "psychological warfare".

On 19 February 2024 the Mujahideen Brigades's spokesperson Abu Bilal confirmed that three members of the Bibas family had been killed in an Israeli airstrike about three weeks after being kidnapped by the Mujahideen Brigades on 7 October 2023. He accused Netanyahu of "deliberately targeting them with his army's missiles to evade paying the price due for their liberation".

Hamas also offered to release Yarden Bibas for the funeral in November 2023. Yarden was in Hamas' own custody, separate from the other family members held by the Mujahideen Brigades. Israel rejected the offer and Yarden remained in Gaza for a further 14 months. When Yarden Bibas was released in early 2025, the IDF claimed that they still could not confirm if the other family members were alive or dead. Israel "demand Hamas clarify" their status. According to the ceasefire deal living women and children were supposed to be released first and dead bodies last.

On 17 February 2025 Hamas announced that the bodies of the Bibas family would be released with other dead hostages, as agreed by the ceasefire deal. Some reports implied that Hamas themselves had decided for themselves to release the Bibas family's bodies first, and possibly ahead of schedule. The negotiator Khalil al-Hayya said the Hamas movement "decided to hand over four bodies on Thursday, among them (those of) the Bibas family".

When the Brigades released the bodies of Shiri Bibas and her children the Brigades stated that they themselves had captured the family and reiterated the accusations that the Israeli military has killed the family. Despite this, some major news sources in the Western media, and far right leaders in the United States, falsely claimed the family had been captured by "Hamas" (the political wing associated with the Qassam Brigades), which contradicted even Israeli sources.

When the bodies were returned to Israel, Israeli operatives claimed that the body returned to them was not Shiri Bibas They claimed to have ruled out any other hostage with DNA testing and they IDF posted a tweet that described the body as an "anonymous unidentified body". The Mujahedeen Movement and Hamas Movement issued several statements in response.

== Sanctions ==
Mujahideen Brigades are on the Specially Designated Nationals and Blocked Persons List ("SDN List") of Office of Foreign Assets Control (OFAC). According to OFAC, they also operate by the names "Al Mujahideen Brigades", "Ansar al-Mujahidin Movement", "Holy Warriors Battalion", and "Khatib Al-Mujahidin". They are also under the US Trade Consolidated Screening List, meaning they're being restricted on certain exports, reexports, or transfers of items.

== See also ==
- Saraya al-Quds
- Palestinian fedayeen
- List of political parties in Palestine
- Alliance of Palestinian Forces
- Palestinian Joint Operations Room
