= Kidnapping and killing of Nattapong Pinta =

Thai hostage killed in Gaza in 2023 or 2024

Nattapong Pinta
- ณัฐพงษ์ ปินตา
- Born: Phrae, Thailand
- Died: late 2023 or early 2024; Southern Gaza Strip, possibly Rafah
- Resting place: Thailand
- Occupation: Agricultural worker
- Known for: Thai national held hostage by Hamas during the 2023 Israel–Hamas war

Nattapong Pinta (Thai: ณัฐพงษ์ ปินตา) (1988-1989 – 2023-2024) was a Thai agricultural worker who was abducted by the Mujahideen Brigades during the October 7 attacks as part of the Nir Oz attack. He was later killed in captivity, and his body was recovered in June 2025 after 609 days in captivity.

== Pre-abduction life ==
Nattapong Pinta was born in Phrae province, Thailand. He married Narissara Chanthasang (Thai: นริศรา จันทะแสง), and the couple had a son, Weerapat. They lived in Nakhon Phanom. Pinta traveled to Israel in 2022, where he would earn a higher salary than he would have back in Thailand. His mother-in-law had mortgaged her rice fields so that Pinta would have enough money to travel to Israel. Pinta sought to pay off his debts and to save money towards opening a coffee shop in Thailand. In Israel, Pinta worked as an agricultural worker at Kibbutz Nir Oz.

== Abduction and killing ==
On October 7, 2023, Nir Oz was attacked by Gazan militants as part of the October 7th attacks. Pinta had told his wife that he was fleeing gunfire. In the weeks following October 7, Pinta's sister called the Thai Embassy in Tel Aviv on a daily basis in an effort to find information regarding Pinta's fate.

Pinta was abducted alive by the Mujahideen Brigades, but there had been no signs of life from him during his captivity. Thus, he had been presumed dead by Israeli officials, but there had not been conclusive evidence for his death to be confirmed.

He is believed to have been killed in captivity, with the IDF estimating that he was killed around December 2023.

== Recovery ==
On June 7, 2025, Pinta's body was recovered from Rafah in an IDF operation. The operation occurred after new intelligence was received following an interrogation of a detained Gazan militant.

After Pinta's body was recovered, Thai Labour Minister Phipat Ratchakitprakarn said that Pinta's family would receive support, including financial compensation.

Pinta's body was repatriated to Thailand on June 11, 2025.
