= Palestinian Freedom Movement =

Palestinian Freedom Movement حركة الأحرار الفلسطينية
- Leader: Khalid Abu-Hilal X
- Spokesperson: Mustafa al-Qishawi
- Founded: 2007
- Split from: Fatah
- Military wing: Al-Ansar Brigades

Website
- http://www.alahrar.ps

Palestinian Freedom Movement (Arabic: حركة الأحرار الفلسطينية, romanized: Ḥarakat al-Aḥrār al-Filasṭīnīyah) is a Palestinian political party and militant group. Initially known as Fatah al-Yasir (Arabic: فتح الياسر), the organization was created by former Fatah members after the Hamas takeover of the Gaza Strip in June 2007. The party was led by Khalid Abu-Hilal ("Abu Adham"), spokesman of the previous Hamas-led government, until his assassination in November 2023. The party is named after Yasser Arafat. The party does not recognize the authority of Mahmoud Abbas and shares Hamas' view that the current Fatah leadership is corrupt and treacherous. The party believe in armed struggle to end the Israeli occupation of the West Bank and Gaza Strip.

== Al-Ansar Brigades ==
Al-Ansar Brigades
- كتائب الأنصار
- Leader: Nael Al Sharif
- Dates active: 2007–present
- Active regions: Gaza Strip
- Ideology: Palestinian nationalism Anti-Zionism
- Part of: Palestinian Freedom Movement; Palestinian Joint Operations Room

It has an armed wing called Al-Ansar Brigades (Arabic: كتائب الأنصار, romanized: Kataeb al-Ansar).
