= Youssef Hussein =

Egyptian YouTuber (born 1988)

- Born: Youssef Hussein; 16 December 1988 (age 37); Cairo, Egypt
- Notable work: Joe Show; Joe Tube; Kabinat Al Ta'liq

Comedy career
- Years active: 2013–present
- Medium: YouTube, television
- Genres: Political/news satire, observational comedy, surreal comedy, black comedy, sarcasm, insult comedy
- Subjects: Mass media/news media/media criticism, Egyptian culture, current events, religion, pop culture

Youssef Hussein (Arabic: يوسف حسين; born 16 December 1988), also known as Joe, is an Egyptian comedian, YouTube content maker, and political satirist. He became famous after presenting the "Joe Tube" program on YouTube, and later the "Joe Show" program on Al Araby TV Network.

== Early life ==
Youssef Hussein was born on 16 December 1988 in Cairo to a family from the village of Kafr Awad Al-Sunita in Dakahlia Governorate. He received his school education in Qatar, where his father worked as a merchant.

== Early career ==
Youssef Hussein became famous after a video clip of him circulated on YouTube about former Egyptian president Mohamed Morsi. Thereafter, Youssef Hussein began presenting a satirical political program, "Joe Tube," with the character of Joe, on the YouTube channel, directed by Ahmed Al-Zariri in 2013.

Hussein left Egypt due to the conditions that occurred as a result of the 2013 coup.

== Joe Show ==
In 2016, Youssef Hussein switched from his YouTube show to present his show on behalf of Joe Show on Al Araby Television Network which broadcasts from London. It is a weekly program that focuses on economy and politics in Egypt and other Arab countries.

== Personal life ==
On 6 December 2020, Hussein revealed that he had tested positive for COVID-19.

== Revocation of nationality ==
In October 2019, an Egyptian lawyer submitted to the Egyptian Ministry of the Interior a request to revoke Youssef Hussein's Egyptian nationality, due to the presentation of his program, Joe Show.

== See also ==
- Bassem Youssef
- Ahmed El-Ghandour (Da7ee7)
- Joe Show
- Mohamed Morsi
