= Palestinian Joint Operations Room =

Alliance of Palestinian armed factions

Joint Operations Room
- غرفة العمليات المشتركة لفصائل المقاومة الفلسطينية
- Leaders: Mohammed Odeh X (Hamas); Akram al-Ajouri (Palestinian Islamic Jihad); Jamil Mezher (Popular Front for the Liberation of Palestine); Nayef Hawatmeh (Democratic Front for the Liberation of Palestine); Ayman al-Shashniya (Popular Resistance Committees); Talal Naji (Popular Front for the Liberation of Palestine – General Command); As'ad Abu Shari'a X (Palestinian Mujahideen Movement); Khalid Abu-Hilal X (Palestinian Freedom Movement); others
- Dates active: 23 July 2018 (8 years ago)
- Allegiance: (Palestine) Gaza Strip under Hamas
- Groups: Al-Qassam Brigades; Al-Quds Brigades; Abu Ali Mustafa Brigades; National Resistance Brigades; Jihad Jibril Brigades; Al-Nasser Salah al-Deen Brigades; Al-Ansar Brigades; Mujahideen Brigades; Al-Aqsa Martyrs' Brigades; Abdul al-Qadir al-Husseini Brigades; Al-Assefa Army; Ayman Jawda Squads
- Ideology: Palestinian nationalism Anti-Zionism; Factions: Communism; Socialism; Islamism
- Political position: Big tent
- Part of: Axis of Resistance

The Palestinian Joint Operations Room, (Note: Arabic: غرفة العمليات المشتركة, romanized: Ghurfat al-ʿAmaliyyāt al-Mushtaraka) officially Joint Room for Palestinian Resistance Factions, (Note: Arabic: الغرفة المشتركة لفصائل المقاومة الفلسطينية, romanized: al-Ghurfa al-Mushtaraka li-Faṣāʾil al-Muqāwama al-Filasṭīniyya) is a Gaza-based joint front and command institution for the military wings of various Palestinian factions. It serves as high command of the de facto armed forces of the Hamas-controlled Gazan government and includes armed groups from various backgrounds, and ideologies from both the right and the left, including Islamists, Marxists, nationalists, and others.

The Joint Operations Room is managed from the Gaza Strip, but forms a single battlefront against Israel from wherever Palestinian militant forces are located, without being confined to a specific geographic area.

== Background ==
The operations room was formed for the first time in 2006 in order to unite against Israel during clashes and wars and included Hamas and the Islamic Jihad Movement, but it fell into obscurity. It was then developed, expanded, and was formed under its current name on July 23, 2018, among 12 military wings after clashes around Al-Aqsa Mosque, the most prominent of which was the installation of electronic gates there by Israel, in what is considered Israeli-occupied East Jerusalem. It currently consists of 12 different armed groups, and has coordinated a large number of attacks on Israel including the October 7 attacks, and has also coordinated defence and retaliations against Israeli attacks. Ayman Nofal said that the goal of the room was to create an inter-organizational alliance to coordinate operations, and increase the potential of the "Palestinian Resistance", and for it to "become a comprehensive framework for all the organizations, networks and fighters, without exception". He also gave a list of the 9 factions out of 12 which he said were "fully unified under the room".

== Activities ==
In 2019, the operations room launched its first military operation in response to the dismembering of the body of a Palestinian fighter on the Israel-Gaza border by Israeli forces, consisting of shelling and rocket fire into Israel.

Since 2020, the operations room has coordinated annual training exercises for military factions in the Gaza Strip, modeling amphibious and ground attacks on Israeli military installations and Kibbutzes. The exercise also included coordinated artillery fire, test rocket launches into the Mediterranean Sea, UAV warfare drills, and military diving. The training modeled maneuvers similar to those seen in the 7 October attack on Israel in 2023.

In mid 2024, the operations room accused the British Armed Forces of collaborating with Israel on its intelligence efforts in Gaza.

== Members ==
- Al-Qassam Brigades: Islamic Resistance Movement (Hamas)
- Al-Quds Brigades: Palestinian Islamic Jihad (PIJ)
- Abu Ali Mustafa Brigades: Popular Front for the Liberation of Palestine (PFLP)
- National Resistance Brigades: Democratic Front for the Liberation of Palestine (DFLP)
- Al-Nasser Salah al-Deen Brigades: Popular Resistance Committees (PRC)
- Al-Aqsa Martyrs' Brigades (ex-Fatah, no longer aligned with it)
- Mujahideen Brigades: Palestinian Mujahideen Movement
- Al-Ansar Brigades: Palestinian Freedom Movement
- Jihad Jibril Brigades: Popular Front for the Liberation of Palestine – General Command (PFLP-GC)

Ex-Fatah groups not mentioned by Nofal:

- Abdul al-Qadir al-Husseini Brigades
- Al-Assefa Army
- Ayman Jawda Squads
