= Haggagovic =

World traveler and TV presenter (born 1984)

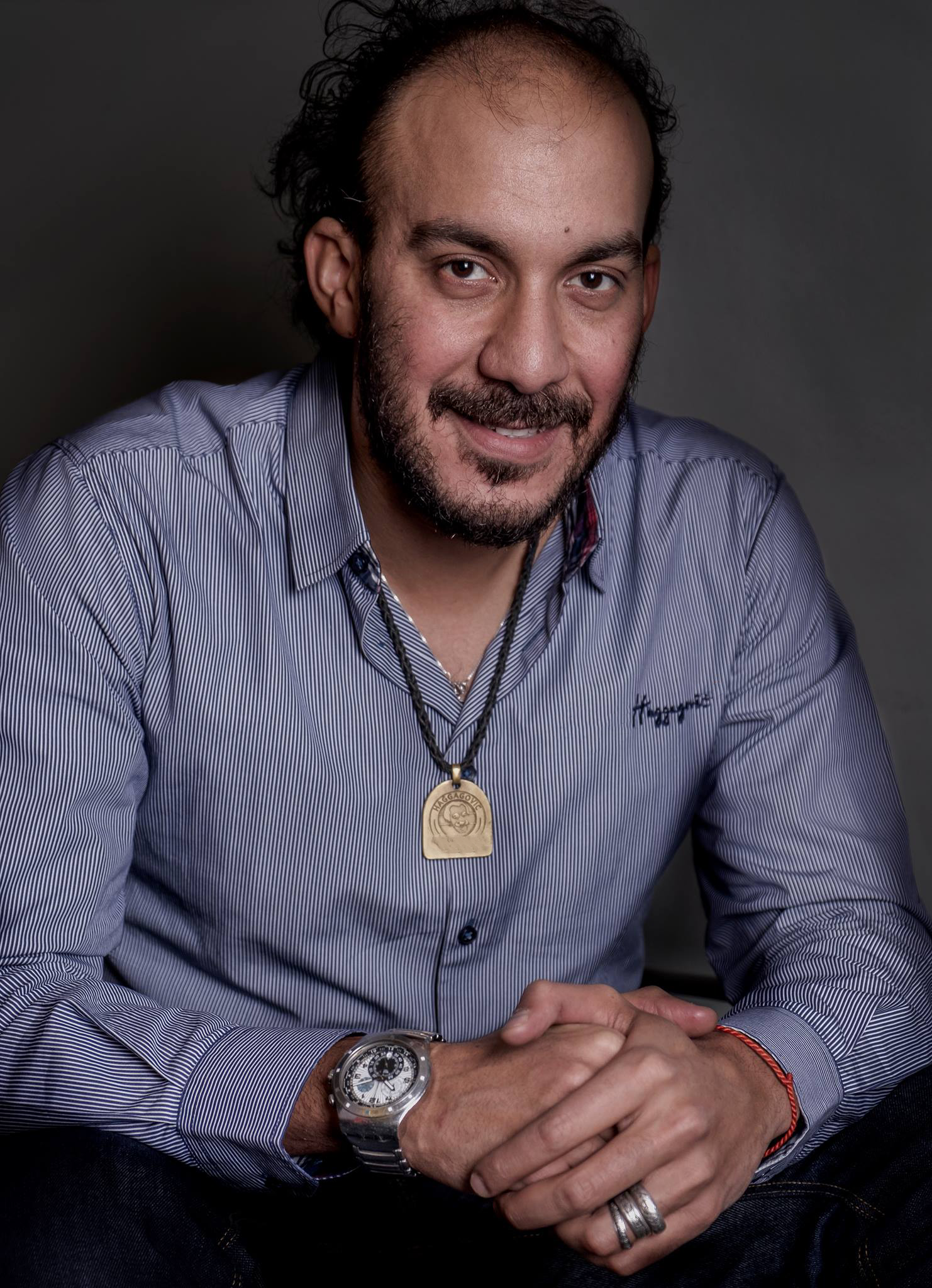
- Haggagovic in 2020
- Born: Ahmed Haggagovic; 7 October 1984 (age 42); Heliopolis, Egypt
- Other name: "Ibn Batuta of the 21st century"
- Years active: 2007-
- Known for: Traveled to 157 countries
- Notable work: World peace ambassador
- Website: haggagovic

Ahmed Haggag (Egyptian Arabic: احمد حجاج, born 7 October 1984), known as Haggagovic, is an Egyptian World traveler, adventurer, TV presenter and expert international tourism specialist. He is awarded as one of the most social media influencers in Middle East and he is the host of the most influential travel TV show in the Arab world Safari Haggagovic aired weekly on ONTV (Egypt), Haggagovic is also known as "Ibn Batuta of the 21st century" and the "extraordinary ambassador", and the "ambassador of world peace", his mission is to be the first human in history to travel to all the countries of the world, documenting them by videos and photos on his reality travel show, in order to spread the values of peace and love, and to break stereotypes and correct the wrong thoughts about the world's countries.

Haggagovic has visited 157 countries around the world and documented these countries by photos and videos. He has also given lectures for school children, university students, multinational organisations and cooperations in all the countries he has visited.

Haggagovic has appeared in more than 1500 media organizations.

== TV Travel shows Safari Haggagovic and Haggagovic World ==
Haggagovic has the most popular TV travel show in Egypt and Middle East Safari Haggagovic which is watched by millions worldwide on TV and online pages, and in 2020 he celebrated Season 8 and 250 episodes of Haggagovic World weekly travel show on ONTV (Egypt).

== Early life ==
When he was four years old he refused to go to the first day of school, as he was crying loud that he wanted to travel to Japan. When he was asked on a TV show for kids about his future dreams, he answered quickly, "I want to travel to every country in the world," not to be a pilot or engineer like the other kids.

== Dream list ==
At the age of 14 he wrote on a paper a list of his dreams, which included:

- Visit the statue of the dog Hachiko in Shibuya Square in Japan.
- Visit the Waitomo glow worm caves in New Zealand.
- Travel on the top of a train in India.
- Celebrate two New Year's parties in one day in two different countries (which he actually did in 2013 in Tonga in the South Pacific).
- Be one of the most peace influential persons in history.

== Education ==
Haggagovic studied Escola de Comunicações e Artes at Universidade de São Paulo and graduated in 2007, the same year he began his trips.

He is fluent in five languages beside Arabic: English, Portuguese (including Brazilian Portuguese), Swedish, Spanish, and French.

He had been awarded many doctorate degrees from different universities worldwide, for his mission promoting tourism and peace.

== Beginning of his dream ==
After graduating from university in 2007, began carrying with him his message around the world (freedom, happiness, peace, one world united without racial tension, one world united without borders). He faced and continues to face difficulties, as he was forced to sell his car and home to complete his dream. Always in his lectures he urges young people not to be disappointed. All of this is under the slogan "Dream, Believe, and Go."

== Achievements ==
Haggagovic has arrived in 157 countries, documented by photos and videos. This is more than the countries documented by the founder of National Geographic itself.

He is the first person from Egyptian origins to visit the kingdom of Tonga, the farthest country on earth from Egypt.

- First person from Egyptian origins to raise his country's flag in the North Pole and South Pole.
- First person from Egyptian origins to visit the highest point in Greenland.
- First person from Egyptian origins to sit in the coldest room in the world - 120 Celsius for five minutes.
- First person from Egyptian origins, African and Arab to document Trans-Siberian Railway train journey (the longest train trip in the world) in 47 degrees Celsius.
- First person from Egyptian origins to skydive from 17,500 ft(the highest skydiving in the world) over Sydney Beach in Australia.
- First person from Egyptian origins to jump from the highest bungee jump in the world, 233m in Macau.
- He was awarded the honor of the Egyptian Necklace in honor of his efforts for the nation.
- He was awarded the shield by the Egyptian Ministry of Youth in recognition of his support for the Egyptian youth.
- He was cited in the state education curriculum in Denmark as one of the most inspiring people in the world for children and young people in achieving their dreams.
- He and his Egyptian flag have exceeded the number of countries visited by the World Cup (89) and have nearly overtaken the countries visited by the Olympic torch.

== Meeting with world leaders ==
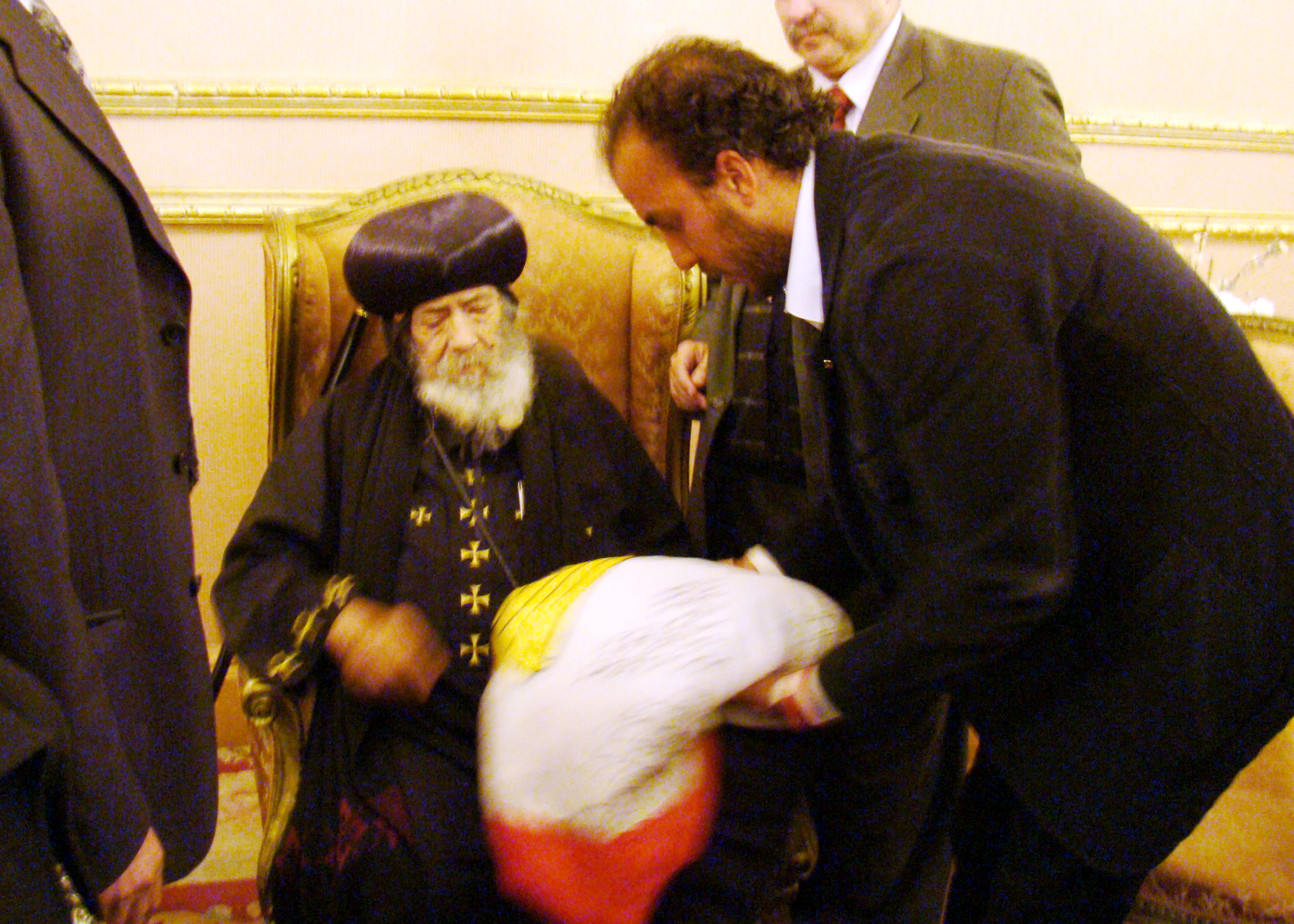
Haggagovic meeting Pope Shenouda III of Alexandria

During his travels, he has met a number of the most important world personalities:

- Former president of Brazil Luiz Inácio Lula da Silva, who said "If you were a Brazilian citizen we would have made to you a gold statue in Brazil."
- Former president of Argentina, Cristina Fernandez, on International Women's Day in Presidential Palace - Argentina.
- Mahathir Mohamed, the former prime minister of Malaysia, who was thinking how to benefit from Haggagovic in the revitalization of tourism in Malaysia
- Adviser of the Japanese emperor, the adviser of the king of Thailand, and Secretary-General of the United Nations, Ban Ki-moon
- Head of the European Union
- Prime minister of Liechtenstein
- Crown prince of the kingdom of Tonga
- Prime minister of Lithuania
- Prime minister of Finland
- Buzz Aldrin, the second person to walk on the Moon
- Many of the royal families and prime ministers, and all the Egyptian ambassadors, of all the countries he visited.
- Abdel Fattah el-Sisi, who signed for him on his famous Egyptian flag, "All the best Insaallah"
- Foreign Minister Sameh Shoukry
- All Egyptian foreign ministers from 2010 -2020
- Late pope Shenouda 3
- Al-azhar sheikh Ahmed Al-tayeb

== His mission to spread peace worldwide ==
Haggagovic says his purpose is to spread the message of peace to the world. This appears through his care to visit schools and universities, and set up events to raise awareness centered on tolerance and unity.

Haggagovic has visited many religious places, Islamic, Hindu, Buddhism, Hinduism and Christian, to prove that all the world's religions call for peace.

Due to his efforts in promoting peace, the Nobel Peace Prize center sent him an invitation to visit their headquarters in Oslo, Norway for his efforts to spread peace.

== Haggagovic with the youth ==
Through his experiences and trips, Haggagovic was able to attract young people from all over the world to learn from him how to be patient and insistent on the dream, as Haggagovic was famous for saying "Dream, Believe, and Go."

== Haggagovic in the media ==
He has appeared in many newspapers around the world. One of the most prominent was Time magazine, which said, "Haggagovic is the extraordinary ambassador". He has appeared in more than 1500 media interviews worldwide.

His huge success started in 2010 when has recorded a special web episodes with collaboration with Orange Egypt about his trip to Russia and Asia named Haggagovic Around the World. which reached millions viewers and then was aired on TV. It features photos and videos about the world's citizens in countries such as Japan, Vietnam, Thailand, India, Macau, Malaysia, Hong Kong, Indonesia, Singapore, Taiwan, China, Korea, Russia, Siberia, and Mongolia. The program has earned an award as one of the best television programs on realistic travel and trips from Dubai international festival.

== Supporters ==
All the Egyptian embassies in all the countries visited by Haggagovic welcomed him and arranged for him meetings with many senior officials and other leaders.

Haggagovic expressed his thanks and appreciation to the ministry of foreign affairs and all ambassadors of Egypt abroad and Egyptian embassies all around the world, as they gave Haggagovic a great support in his trips.

EgyptAir is the official carrier for Haggagovic's flights.

== See also ==
- List of peace activists
