= Arab International Academy =

Arab International Academy (AIA)
- الأكاديمية العربية الدولية

Location
- Doha; Qatar
- Coordinates: 25°17′10″N 51°29′30″E

Information
- Type: Private
- Established: 2016
- Chairman: Abdullah bin Ali Al-Thani
- Grades: Pre K–12
- Nickname: AIA
- Website: www.aia.qa

Arab International Academy (AIA), (Arabic: الأكاديمية العربية الدولية) is located in Doha, Qatar. Founded in 2016, AIA is an International Baccalaureate (IB) World School for the Diploma Programme (DP) and Middle Years Programme (MYP), and is now an authorised school for the IB Primary Years Programme (PYP). Its chairman is Abdullah bin Ali Al-Thani, an adviser in the Amiri Diwan in Doha, Qatar.

== Curriculum ==
As an IB World School for the DP (grades 11 and 12), the MYP (grades 6-10), and a candidate school for the PYP (grades KG-5), AIA implements high-quality international academic programs that develop the whole person cognitively, socially, emotionally and physically. Also, it considers the following standards in its programs; the Qatari local standards in education, the American Education Reaches Out (AERO), and the Common Core State Standards (CCSS).

Arab International Academy primarily focuses on Arabic and English languages at all levels, and allows students to learn French as an additional language.
