= Al Araby Television Network =

Pan-Arab television channel headquartered in Qatar

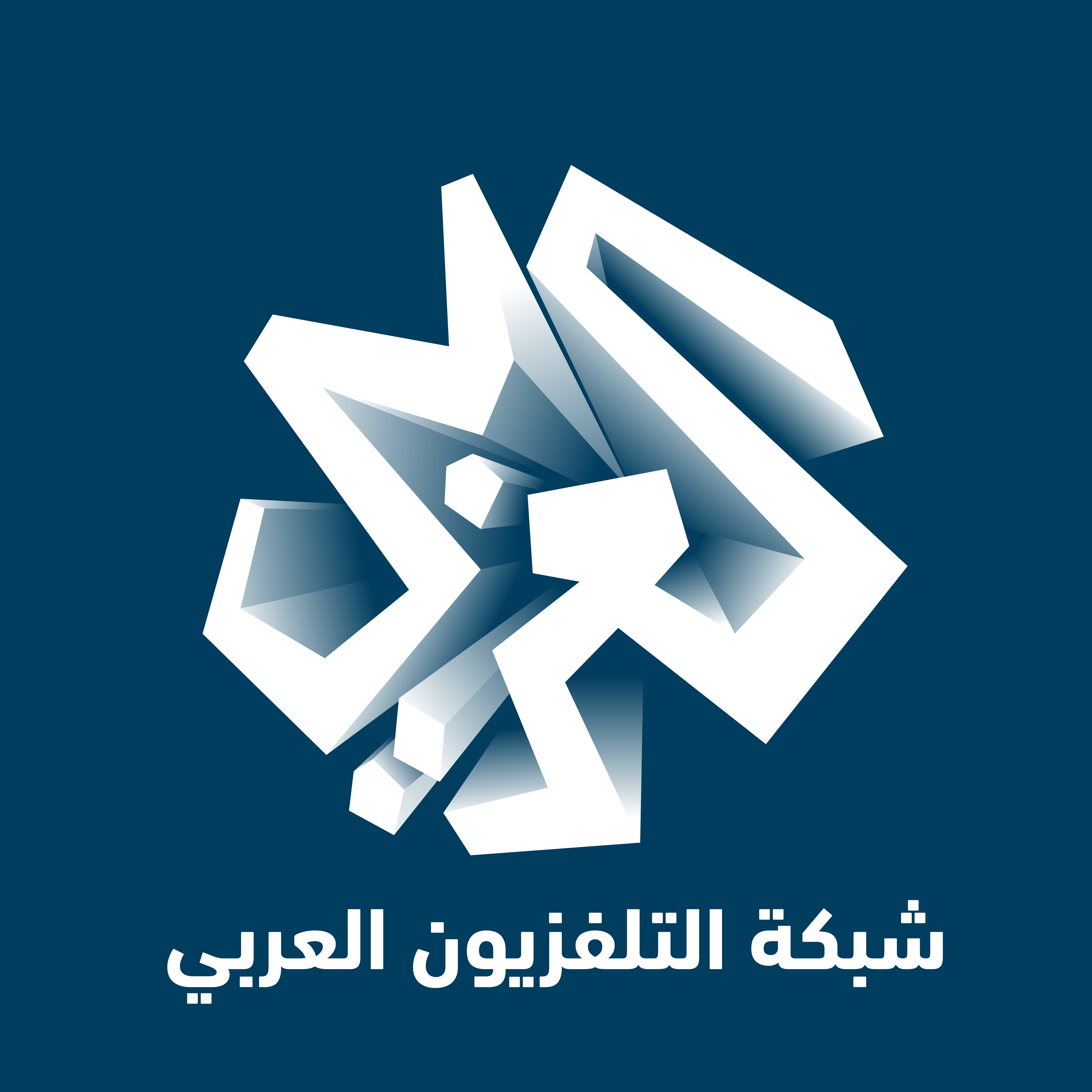
- Country: Qatar
- Broadcast area: MENA; Europe
- Stations: Al Araby TV; Al Araby 2
- Headquarters: Lusail, Qatar

Programming
- Language: Arabic
- Picture format: HD, SD

Ownership
- Owner: FadaatMedia
- Key people: Abbad Yahya, CEO

History
- Founded: January 2015
- Launched: 25 January 2015
- Founder: Fadaat Media

Links
- Website: www.alaraby.com www.alaraby2.com

Availability

Terrestrial
- Es'hail: AL ARABY 1 HD, AL ARABY 2 HD
- Eutelsat 7 West A: AL ARABY 1 HD, AL ARABY 2 HD

Streaming media
- Bein: Al Araby, Al Araby 2
- ROKU: Al Araby, Al Araby 2
- OSN: Al Araby, Al Araby 2

Al Araby Television Network (Arabic: شبكة التلفزيون العربي) is a Qatari television network owned by Qatari company Fadaat Media. It was launched in January 2015, and includes two main channels "Al Araby TV" and "Al Araby 2", in addition to digital projects that broadcast exclusive programs such as "Ana Al Araby" and "Al Araby Tube".

It broadcasts a variety of programs and news shows in Arabic, covering society, politics, entertainment, and culture. The network has bureaus in several Arab and Western capitals, through 11 bureaus in the Middle East and worldwide and relying on a network of correspondents spread across 33 cities worldwide.

Formerly based in London, Al Araby Television Network announced it would move its headquarters to Qatar in 2021. The move was heavily advertised on social media in the weeks leading up to the eventual shift of operations to Lusail planned city on 30 August 2022.

== History ==
- January 25, 2015: The network was established, and Al-Araby TV launched its trial broadcast from London.
- March 5, 2017: Abbas Nasser was appointed as the new executive director of the network.
- 2019: Journalists for Al-Araby TV were targeted by hackers affiliated with Project Raven, a UAE initiative to target the mobile phones of media figures the UAE believed were supported by Qatar.
- January 25, 2021: The official website of Al-Araby TV was launched, enhancing its digital presence.
- January 2, 2022: Al-Araby 2 TV, a cultural and entertainment-focused channel, was launched, expanding the network's offerings.
- August 30, 2022: The network's headquarters was relocated from London, United Kingdom, to Lusail City, Qatar, marking the start of the news channel's broadcast from its new location.
- October 2022: Abbad Yahya was appointed as the General Manager of the network, bringing a new vision to its leadership.

== Organisation and staff ==
It is estimated that Alaraby TV is home to more than 400 media staff.

=== Management ===
On the administrative level, Palestinian writer, journalist, and media professional Abbad Yahya serves as the executive director, a position he has held since 2022. Before him, Egyptian lawyer Islam Lotfy was the founding executive director in 2015. From 2017 to 2022, the position was held by Lebanese journalist Abbas Nasser, previously a presenter at Al Jazeera, who contributed significantly to the channel's growth.

=== Presenters and reporters ===
Names include Dima Ezzeddine, Jamal Ezzeddine, Wael Tamimi, Zaher Omareen, Rola Haidar, Salma El Dali, Nidal Hamdi, Sarmad Akram, and Farah Fawaz, among many others.

As for presenters on Al-Araby TV and Al-Araby 2, these include the satirical Egyptian YouTuber Youssef Hussein, Badr Al-Sayegh, Lebanese musician Marwan Khoury, Egyptian artist Hamza Namira, Moroccan artist Rachid Gholam, and seasoned media professional Aref Hijjawi. In earlier programs, personalities such as journalist Asaad Taha and writer Bilal Fadl were among the most recognized faces on the channel.

Field reporters include Ahmad Darawsha from Palestine, Adnan Can from Turkey, Abdulrahman Bardisi from Washington, D.C., Christine Rinawi from Jerusalem, Ahmad Hussein from Egypt, and Yasser Abu Muailiq from Berlin, among others.

== Offices ==
The main headquarters of Al-Araby TV Network is located in Lusail City, north of Doha, Qatar. Prior to 2022, the network's primary offices were based in London, UK, before the decision to relocate to Qatar. In addition to its headquarters, the network operates regional centers in Beirut, Lebanon, and Tunis, Tunisia.

The network's reach extends through various offices in numerous Arab, regional, and international locations, including Yemen, Iraq, the United States, Russia, and Palestine (Ramallah, Gaza, and Jerusalem), as well as Libya, Algeria, Jordan, and Pakistan. These offices are supported by a network of over 64 correspondents stationed across more than 30 countries, spanning East Asia, the Middle East, and the United States, ensuring comprehensive global coverage.

== Areas of coverage ==
Since its launch in 2015, it has highlighted the demands and movements of Arab populations during the Arab Spring through field reporting and analysis, offering insights into political and social transformations. The network has also documented the Syrian Revolution since 2011, providing live reports, field coverage, and commentary on the humanitarian crisis and the conflict's broader implications.

From 2023, Al-Araby TV have covered the Gaza war with on-ground reporting. The English version of their website, The New Arab, regularly covers developments in the Israeli–Palestinian conflict.

Al-Araby TV and The New Arab have been subject to criticism after their Arabic-language article on the Al-Ahli Arab Hospital explosion alleged that Israel was responsible for committing "genocide", while their English-language article acknowledged that the Biden administration and others claim that a misfired rocket from Palestinian Islamic Jihad was responsible for the explosion.

== Notable programs ==
=== Remix ===
In 2016, Hamza Namira launched the TV series Remix (in Arabic: ريمكس) on Al Araby TV. The series filmed in a number of countries featured the relevance of the songs chosen from the various folkloric repertoire of a number of Arab countries, and the process through Namira's collaborations with a number of artists and musical groups in remixing. Each 30-minute episode would end with a special collaborative performance of the songs by Namira and an accompanying musical band or vocalists in a contemporary fashion. A new series was announced on the same channel that aired in 2017 and a further third series in 2018.

=== Tarab ===
Tarab with Marwan Khoury (in Arabic: طرب مع مروان الخوري) airs every Friday on Al Araby, where the host Marwan Khoury, Lebanese singer, writer, composer and music arranger, showcases Arab classic songs.

=== Joe Show ===
Joe Show (in Arabic: جو شو) is a talk show and political satire television program hosted by Egyptian comedian Youssef Hussein. It airs each Thursday on Al Araby TV. The show mainly discusses events and news from the Arab world in a comic and cynical manner. The television program sheds light on the media biases in the Arab world. The show consists of four segments; the first two parts cover current events in Egypt, the last two parts looks at the rest of the Arab world.

=== Zool Cafe ===
Zool Cafe joined Alaraby TV in December 2019. The show was one of the biggest Sudanese shows on YouTube. It tackles social and political issues in Sudan.

=== Al Araby Today ===
Al Araby Today (in Arabic: العربي اليوم) hosted by Fida Bassil, a former BBC presenter, and Badr Al-Sayegh, also a former BBC Arabic anchor, is a political daily talk show discussing events in the Arab world.

=== In Another Narrative ===
In Another Narrative (in Arabic: وفي رواية أخرى) is a weekly talk show hosted by Badr Al-Sayegh, featuring prominent guests such as former officials and human rights advocates.

=== The Story Continues ===
The Story Continues (in Arabic: للخبر بقية), this daily talk show provides a detailed analysis of the day's most prominent news headline, as featured in the network's broadcasts.

=== Behind the Scenes ===
Behind the Scenes (in Arabic: كواليس) is a documentary program analyzing political history through historical documents and firsthand testimonies.

=== The Last ===
The Last (in Arabic: الأخيرة) is a daily program that monitors, analyzes, and discusses the most significant Arab and international events.

=== Polygraph ===
Polygraph (in Arabic: بوليغراف) is a weekly program that examines rumors circulated by media outlets and social media platforms.

=== The Disappeared ===
The Disappeared (in Arabic: مختفون) follows the stories of Arab individuals who vanished under mysterious political circumstances.

=== Memoirs ===
Memoirs (in Arabic: مذكرات) is a docudrama-style program that delves into the memoirs of figures from significant historical periods.

=== Ladies and Gentlemen ===
Ladies and Gentlemen (in Arabic: سيداتي سادتي), is a weekly program on Al Araby 2, hosted by media personality Aref Hijjawi.

== Rewards ==
Al-Araby TV Network has garnered awards on Arab, regional, and international levels. These include:

1. "Best Digital Live Streaming Service in the Arab World" (2024): Awarded at a ceremony organized by the Global Social Media Forum.
2. Shorty Awards (2024): recognized for the episode "Illusions of Happiness," addressing the dangers of addiction.
3. Silver Award at the Arab Radio and Television Festival (2024): Honored in the documentary category for the film "Flames of Morgues."
4. Webby Awards Certificate of Recognition (2023): Presented by the International Academy of Digital Arts and Sciences for excellence in video editing as part of Al-Araby TV Network's visual identity update campaign.
5. Hermes Creative Awards (2023): Gold for the network's updated visual identity campaign, and Platinum for the design of the "Hello Ramadan" program aired on Al-Arabi 2, and for a VR-powered report on the war in Ukraine.
6. A'Design Bronze Award (2023): recognized for the revamped visual identity.
7. Telly Awards (2023): Silver for the VR report on the Ukraine war, and Bronze for the updated visual identity.
8. AVA Digital Awards (Platinum, 2022): Awarded for the innovative design of the "Akhirah" news bulletin, highlighting excellence in digital communication production.
9. "Best TV Campaign Engagement on Social Media" (2022): Awarded for the campaign "Alaraby on Arab Ground" marking the network's relocation to Lusail City, Qatar.
10. "The Best TV Program Monitoring Fake News" (2022): Recognized for "Polygraph," a weekly show tackling prominent media and social media myths.
11. BroadcastPro ME Award (2022): Celebrated for the technological ingenuity of the network's new headquarters in Lusail City, Qatar, showcasing advanced lighting, filming, and centralized broadcasting systems.
12. MarCom Awards (Platinum & Gold, 2021): Platinum for a report on Iran's nuclear facilities, and Gold for coverage of the Ethiopian Renaissance Dam crisis.
13. "Best Arab Channel" (2018): Presented by the Global Arab Awards in Marrakech, Morocco, recognizing professionalism, content quality, and innovative presentation.

== Satellite frequencies ==
=== Al Araby TV ===
Sat	NileSat	NileSat	Hot Bird
Frequency	10971	12646	12520
Polarization	Horizontal	Horizontal	Vertical
Symbol Rate	27500	27500	27500
FEC	7/8	7/8	3/4

=== Al Araby 2 TV ===
Sat	NileSat	NileSat
Frequency	11392	11258
Polarization	Vertical	Horizontal
Symbol Rate	27500	27500
FEC	7/8	5/6

== See also ==
- The New Arab
- List of Arabic-language television channels
- Mass media in Qatar
- Al Jazeera Media Network
