= Gali Berman =

Israeli hostage taken by Hamas in 2023

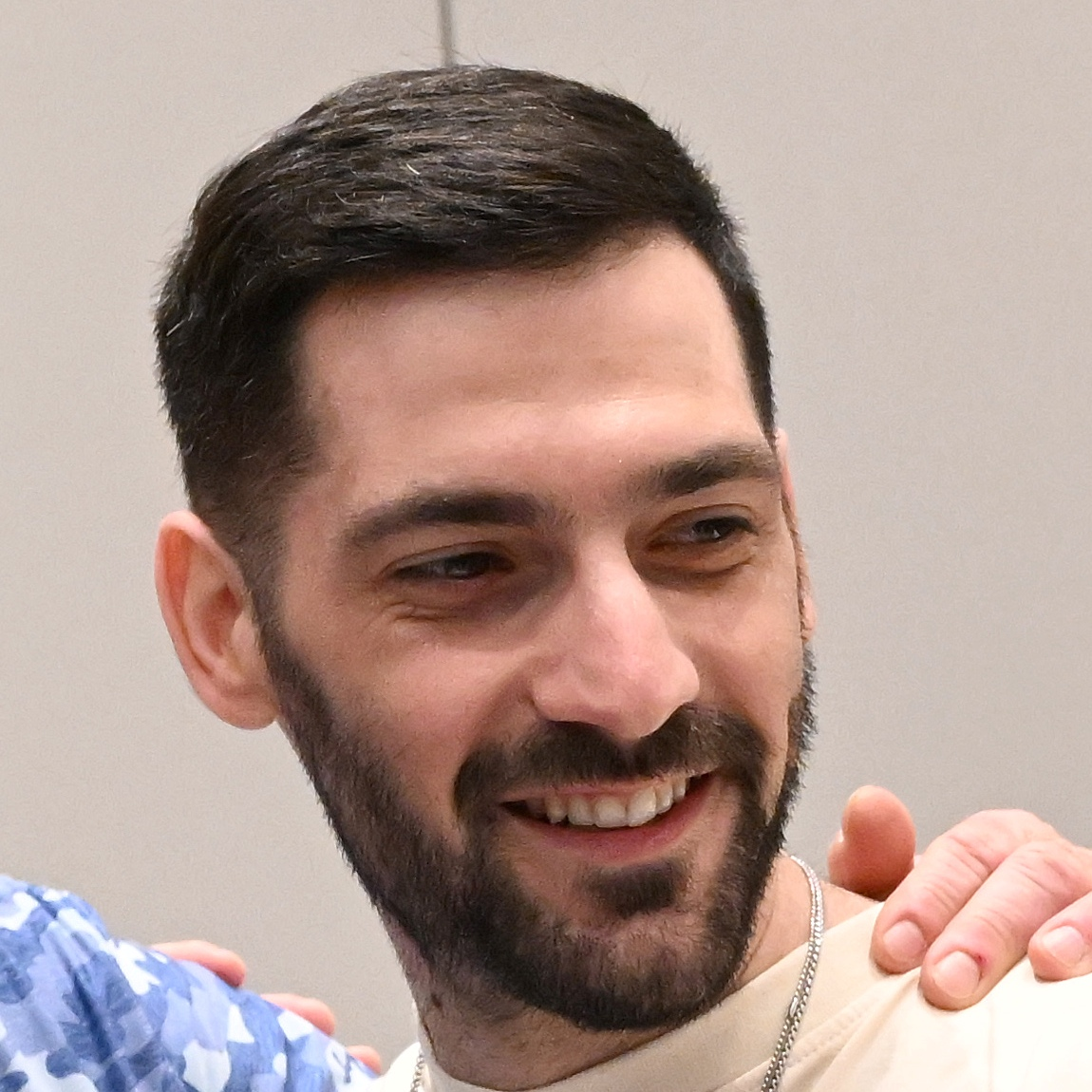
- Gali Berman after his release in October 2025
- Born: 10 September 1997 (age 29)
- Known for: the Gaza war hostage crisis

Gali Berman (Hebrew: גלי ברמן; born 10 September 1997) is an Israeli civilian who was abducted together with his fraternal twin brother, Ziv, from Kibbutz Kfar Aza during the Hamas-led attacks of 7 October 2023 and taken to the Gaza Strip. After 738 days in captivity, he was released on 13 October 2025 together with his brother and 18 other Israeli hostages, as part of the third hostage exchange agreement between Israel and Hamas. The agreement, reached alongside a ceasefire, provided for the release of all living Israeli hostages held in Gaza in exchange for Palestinian prisoners.

== Early life ==
Berman was born on 10 September 1997 to parents Talia and Doron Berman, and grew up in Kibbutz Kfar Aza alongside his twin brother, Ziv. Their father has Parkinson's disease that deteriorated significantly during their captivity. They have a younger brother Liran. The two lived next to each other in the kibbutz's young adults’ neighborhood. In 2010, Gali won the Rika Barkovitch National Children's Writing Competition.

Prior to his abduction, Berman worked together with his brother as a lighting and sound technician. Both brothers were known supporters of the football clubs Maccabi Tel Aviv and Liverpool. The twins were described by news outlets as “Maccabi loving,” and after their return they attended their first football match together at Bloomfield Stadium, thanking supporters for their encouragement during captivity.

== Abduction ==
On the morning of 7 October 2023, during the attack on Kibbutz Kfar Aza, Berman awoke to rocket sirens around the first barrage from the Gaza Strip around 6:30 am. Berman left his own safe room and house armed with a kitchen knife, after a video call from his neighbor Emily Damari stating she was scared and took shelter with her in the reinforced safe room of her home. Berman sent a photo of the pair to his mother shortly before they were kidnapped. Shortly thereafter, Berman and Damari were abducted together with Berman's twin brother, Ziv, and taken to the Gaza Strip. Reportedly Hamas militants set fire to Ziv's home causing him to leave his safe room and caused him to be abducted.

Approximately ten days after the attack, the family was informed by the Israel Defense Forces that the brothers had most likely been abducted. According to media reports at the time, family members and released hostages indicated that the twins were separated during captivity, held in harsh conditions with limited contact and food shortages.

== Captivity ==
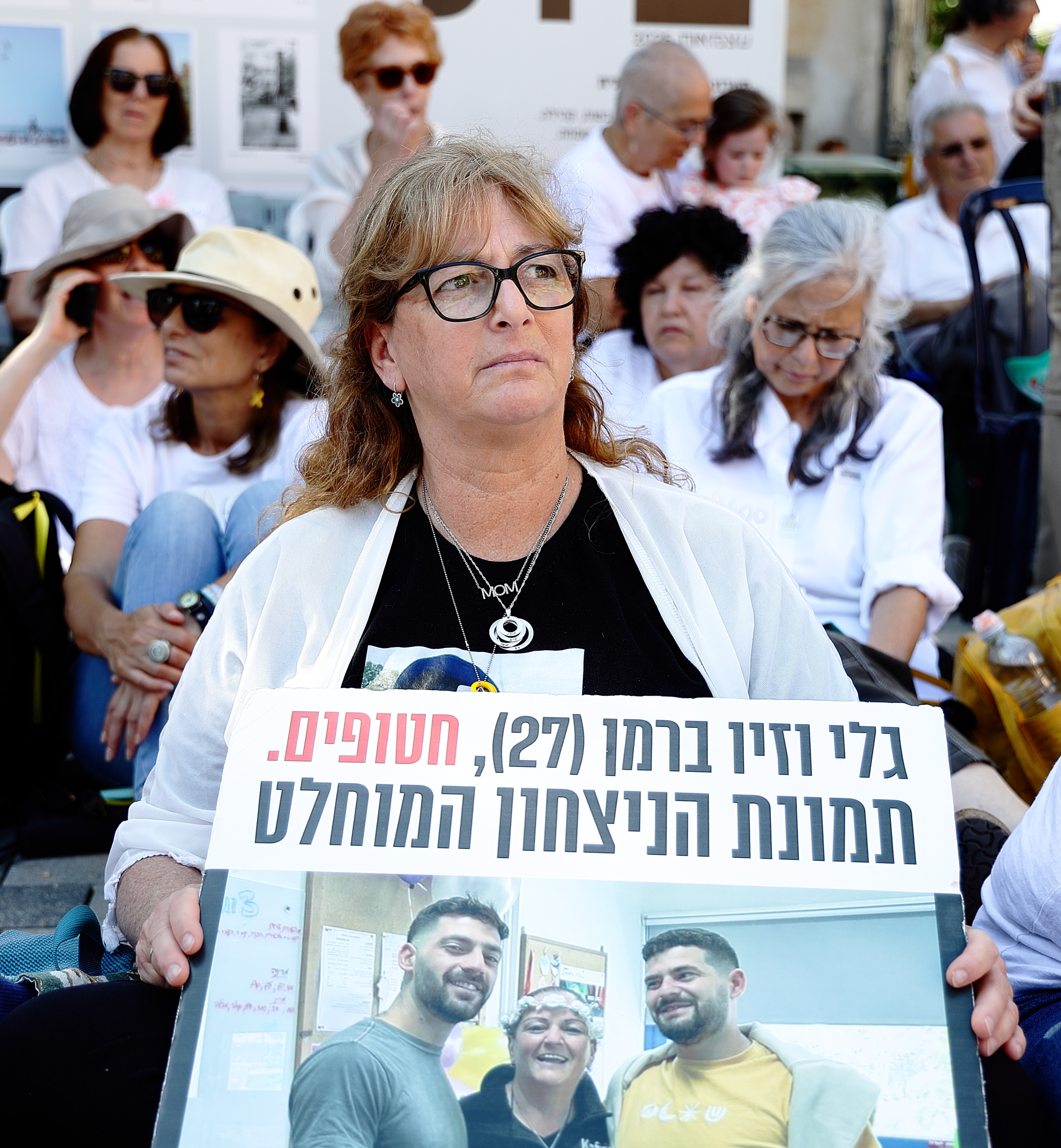
Maccabet Meyer, aunt of twins Gali and Ziv Berman marking the 600th day of the war in Gaza and the 58 abductees still in Gaza

Testimonies from hostages who were later released indicated that Gali and Ziv Berman were separated during their captivity, with neither knowing for the first six months of captivity the status of the other. Reportedly during his captivity Berman kept telling the militants that he wanted to see his brother after learning he was also a hostage. After about six months had passed the twins were reunited and held together for two days before being separated, with reportedly a Hamas member telling them "if something happens to you two, your mother won't have to cry twice."

To celebrate the January 2025 cease fire both Berman brothers were brought to a beach with other hostages by Hamas commander Izz al-Din al-Haddad were they were filmed grilling and eating meats and vegetables with Hamas militants to celebrate.

In February 2025, a sign of life was received from both brothers, confirming that they were alive while still in captivity. Reports from the Hostages and Missing Families Forum stated that released hostages had provided video and proof of life, showing that while held in Gaza they were isolated and enduring difficult conditions.

== Release ==
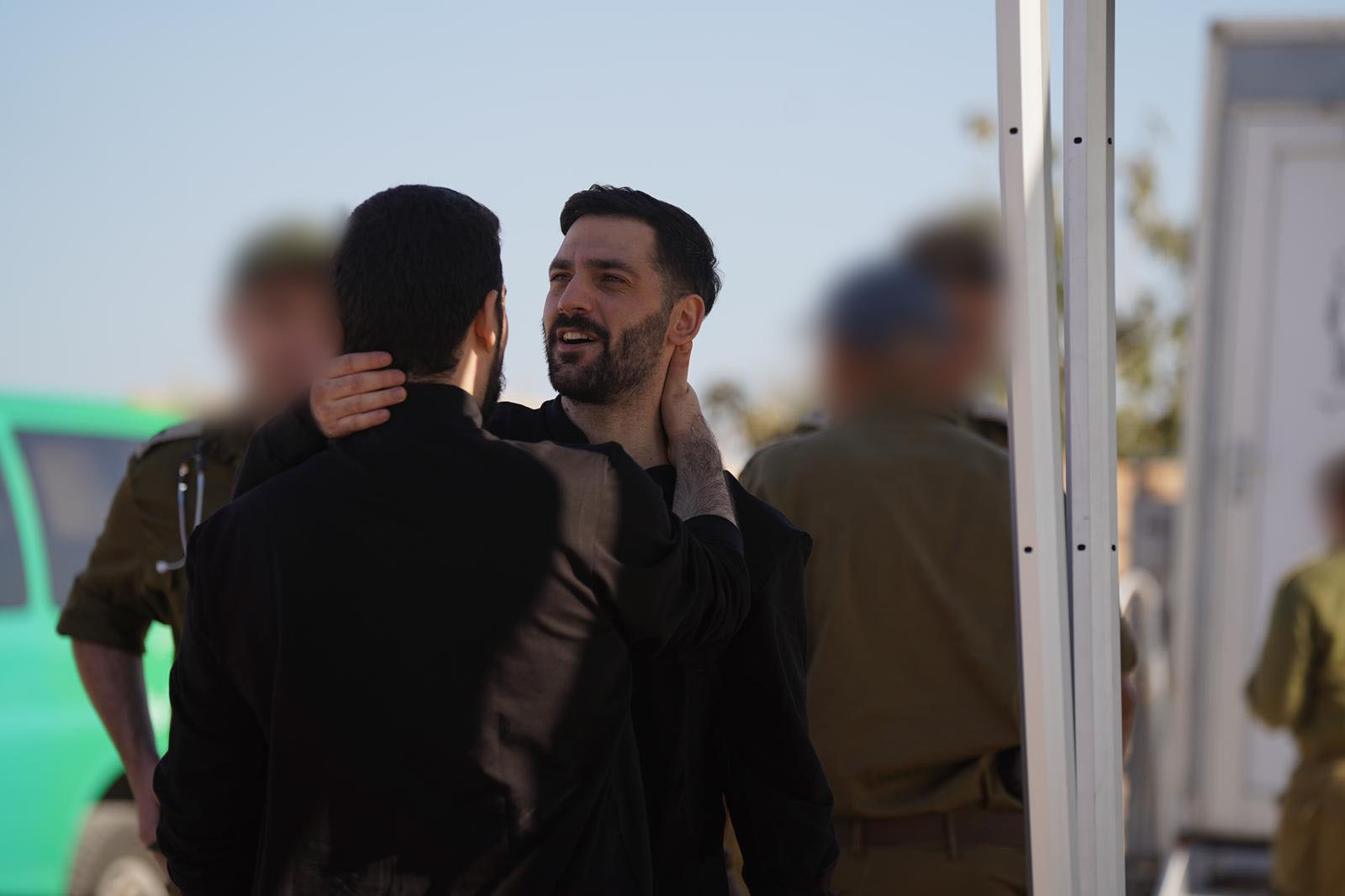
The Berman twins embracing each other immediately after being released from captivity on October 13, 2025

Berman was released from captivity on 13 October 2025 together with his twin brother Ziv and 18 additional hostages, as part of the third hostage deal. Following his release, he was transferred to Sheba Medical Center for medical treatment. They were among the final group of 20 living hostages brought back in the ceasefire deal, which included medical assessments and reunions with families at hospitals across Israel.

== Post-release activities ==
After their release, Gali and Ziv Berman met with the president of Israel, Isaac Herzog. In November 2025, the brothers attended a Maccabi Tel Aviv game, and spoke to attendees prior to the game and thanked them for their support during their captivity. The brothers were a part of about 20 Israeli hostages that traveled to the White House and President Donald Trump to thank him for his and the United States efforts to assist in the release and support of hostages, in November 2025. While speaking with reporters in January 2026 at their home in Beit Guvrin, Gali and Ziv both expressed their intent and desire to move forward, with Gali stating that they don't want to deal with misery anymore.

== See also ==
- List of Gaza war hostages
