= Kidnapping of Emily Damari =

British-Israeli hostage taken by Hamas in 2023

Emily Damari
- Part of the Gaza war hostage crisis
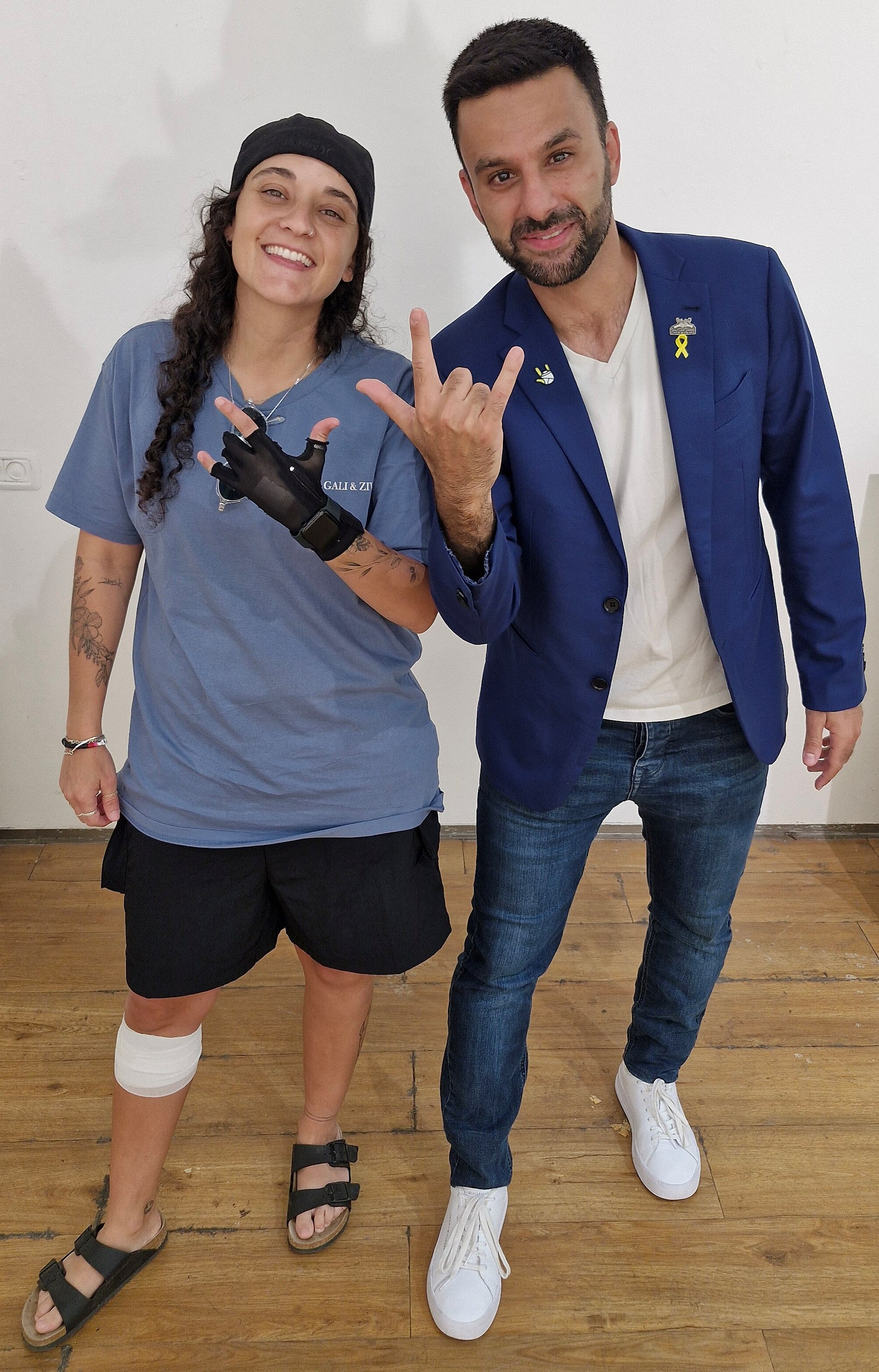
- A June 2025 photo of Damari and Yoseph Haddad doing what has become Damari's signature three finger pose
- Location: Kfar Aza, Southern District, Israel
- Date: 7 October 2023 (kidnapping) – 19 January 2025 (release) (470 days held hostage)
- Attack type: kidnapping, hostage taking
- Perpetrator: Hamas

Emily Damari (born 1997) is a British-Israeli former hostage held by Hamas for over 15 months following her abduction during the 7 October attacks on southern Israel. Her captivity and eventual release under a ceasefire deal received extensive international media coverage and became a focal point for advocacy and public campaigns in both the UK and Israel. Her mother, Mandy Damari, led a widely publicized campaign for her release, drawing attention from the British prime minister, sports fans, and the broader public.

Damari's ordeal, including the loss of two fingers during the attack and her resilience in captivity, made her a symbol of defiance and survival. Her injured hand gesture became iconic in Israel, appearing on posters, t-shirts, and memes. Following her release, she spoke at public events and rallies for the hostages still in captivity. Damari described her efforts to hide her sexual orientation from her captors. Her case inspired solidarity actions, such as football fans at Tottenham Hotspur matches chanting her name, and raised awareness about the ongoing hostage crisis.

== Early life ==
The youngest of four siblings, Damari was born and raised in Kfar Aza, Israel. Damari's father is Israeli. Damari has dual British citizenship through her mother Mandy, who was born in Addington, London, grew up in Beckenham, and moved to Israel in her twenties. One of her brothers is in the Golani Brigade, another is in the Border Guard.

Damari was a staff sergeant with Israeli Border Police based in Hebron; a clip showing Damari speaking about her service published in April 2023 was quickly scrubbed from the internet following her abduction.

== Abduction ==
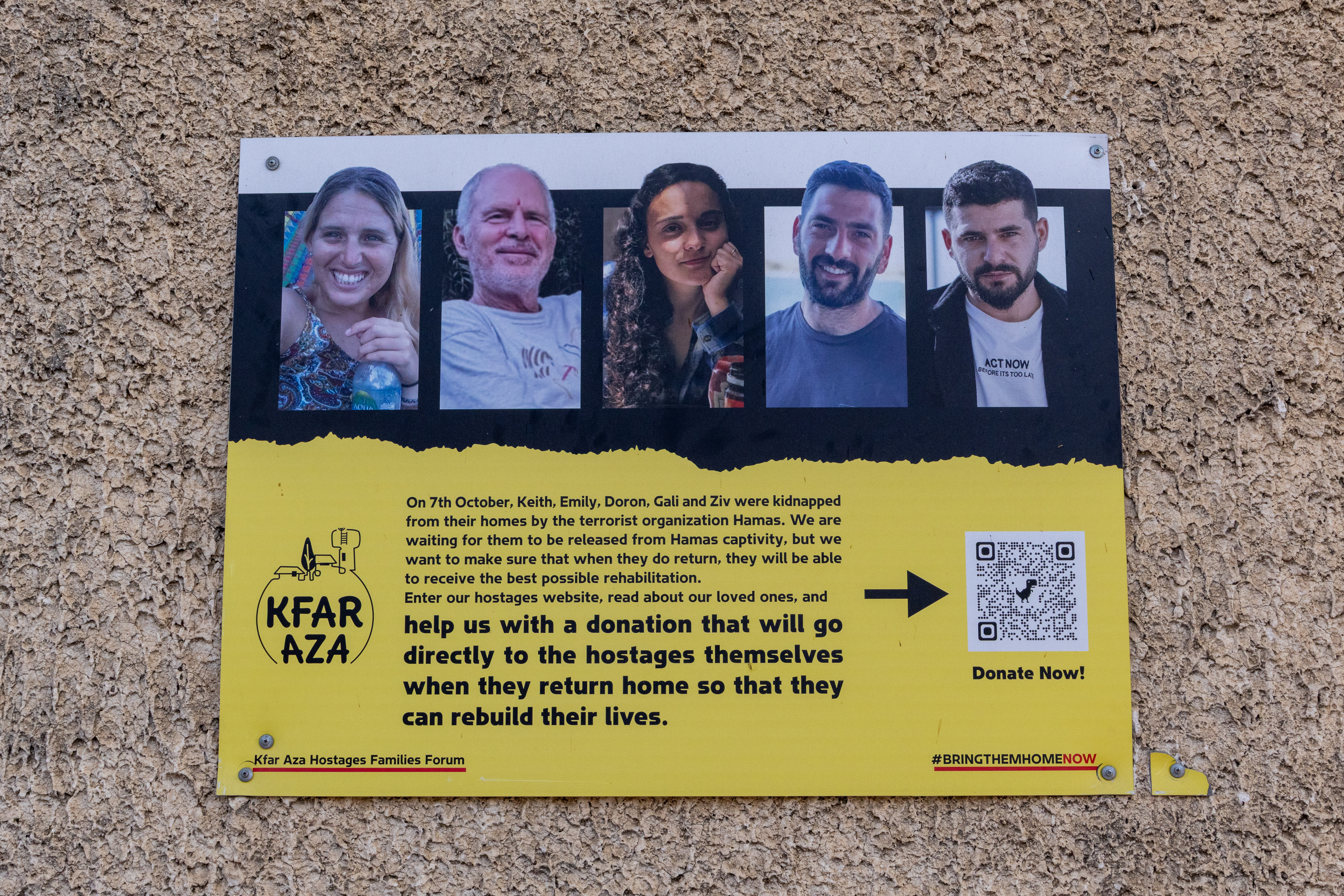
Damari (center) featured in a plaque hung at Kibbutz Kfar Aza featuring kibbutz members who were abducted

According to IDF records, the Kfar Aza kibbutz was attacked the morning of 7 October at around 6:42am with paragliders entering the kibbutz first coupled with rockets, before the fence line was breached. IDF forces responded to the attack quickly with an IDF tank firing on militants, while stationed just outside the fence line of the kibbutz by 7:25am. Damari was taken from the safe room of her house by Hamas, together with her friends, twin brothers Ziv and Gali Berman. Damari was shot in the hand and injured by shrapnel in her leg before being dragged from her home, and lost two fingers in the attack. Hamas also shot and killed her dog, a golden cockapoo.

The night before the attack Damari had attended a friend's birthday party and had told her mother "You don't love me when I'm drunk." after having too much to drink, which her mother refuted. As Damari lived only two streets away from her parents in the kibbutz the day of the attack her mother texted her during the attack stating "I love you even when you're drunk." to which Damari sent a heart emoji.

== Captivity ==
After being blindfolded and forced into her own car, Damari was taken to Shifa Hospital, where a doctor, who introduced himself as "Dr. Hamas", operated on her. When she woke up from her surgery, she realized that she was missing two fingers and her leg wound was not properly stitched. Damari was held for 40 days with Ziv Berman, then with Doron Steinbrecher and Romi Gonen. They were at times housed in humanitarian shelters designated for displaced Gazans, and were later separated.

At times, they received medical help, including a bottle of iodine, but they spent significant stretches of time underground without daylight. Damari received care for her wounds from fellow hostage Romi Gonen, who was a veterinary nurse, but a scar from an 'open, festering wound' did not heal for months. Damari and Gonen were transferred together dozens of times between various hiding places above and below ground. Gonen said when they were held together with five women, as when they were held with 11 others, Damari "would always eat the least so everyone would have enough food."

Damari said she hid her homosexuality from her Hamas captors, adding that she asked one of them what he would do if he discovered his brother was homosexual, and he responded "I would kill him". She said her captors nicknamed her 'John Cena', because she often performed physical exercises to relieve stress, notably up to 600 sit-ups each morning, as well as 'Fuduli', Arabic for 'curious', because she asked questions about how they built the tunnels and their funding. She raised morale among her fellow captives in Hamas tunnels, one day organizing a "lice competition" between lice plucked from their heads.

Damari said she saw her mother on Israeli television, nine months into captivity. Damari later told the British Prime Minister she was held on UNRWA premises. Damari turned 28 while in captivity. Damari was informed of her release the day before it happened.

== Release ==
Emily Damari, along with two other female hostages, arriving in Israel following their 19 January 2025 release. Damari is the freed hostage in a green suit (second to exit the vehicle).

On 19 January 2025 Damari, Gonen and Steinbrecher were released as part of a truce between Israel and Hamas. They were part of the first exchange were hostages, civilians and IDF soldiers, were released exchanged for 90 Palestinian prisoners. Prime Minister Keir Starmer described Damari's release as "wonderful and long-overdue news". Foreign secretary David Lammy said he had grown close to Damari's family.

Damari and the two other hostages were determined to be in stable and good overall condition by Israeli medical officials who gave all three hostages extensive medical checks. All three were released a week from the hospital after their release and were transferred to the Kfar Maccabiah hotel and convention center for further care alongside their families.

== Post-release activities ==
Damari required additional surgery on her hand after her release. In February 2025, Damari was gifted a brand new luxury BMW from an American Jewish community while she was undergoing medical and emotional rehabilitation. That same month Damari visited the Kfar Aza kibbutz and toured the damage and her old apartment along with her family and fellow released hostage Romi Gonen. While there she wrote of her return and a message calling for all hostages to be released on the banner of herself posted on the outside of the building call for her return.

In March 2025, ahead of International Women's Day, Damari was honored by the World Zionist Organization when the organization unveiled a pin with her signature 3 finger pose to inspire people by Damari's "strength and resilience". In April 2025, Damari was honored as one of the torchbearers in the national Israeli Independence Day ceremony.

In May 2025, Damari visited the UK for the first time since her release in January, she thanked her supporters at Tottenham Hotspur Stadium who chanted her name and posed with footballer James Maddison. Damari expressed joy at her visit to the UK, along with some sadness for the death of her British grandfather while she was held by Hamas. In May 2025, she noted that Ziv and Gali Berman remained in captivity along with 59 other hostages, including about 21 thought to be alive. Damari publicly objected to the awarding of a Pulitzer Prize to a Gaza poet who said the hostages should not be called hostages.

In October 2025, after the Gaza Peace Plan was announced Damari and her partner Danielle Amit posted to social media celebrating the peace plan, in one video Damari spoke with the mother of twin brothers Gali and Ziv Berman who were abducted with her from her home. She later joined former hostages including Omer Shem Tov and Eliya Cohen at Hostages Square where they celebrated with other Israelis and family and friends of still held hostages. Damari later posted to social media showing her reunited with Gali and Ziv Berman, in the post she celebrated their return to Israel, spoke about their captivity together, and reflected on the time that she was released but they were still held.

On 22 January 2026, Damari announced her engagement to her partner Amit during a celebration marking the one-year anniversary of her release from Gaza.

== Retaliation by Israel ==
On 19 June 2025, the IDF announced that it killed Muhammad Nasser Ali Kanita, the senior Hamas militant who participated in the 7 October attacks and held Damari in his house at the beginning of the war. In a social media response, Damari characterized Kanita as the "face of evil", and expressed joy that he was no longer alive.

On 31 August 2025, Israel announced that it had killed Hazem Naim, without providing additional information. Damari said that Naim held her and another hostages "for around eight months". She shouted "screams of joy" at the news of his death, a person she characterized as "very, very evil". Another Hamas militant that had held Damari hostage, Muhammad Muhsen Nimr Yazji, was killed by an Israeli airstrike in Gaza City on 8 October 2026.
