= Ziv Berman =

Israeli hostage taken by Hamas in 2023

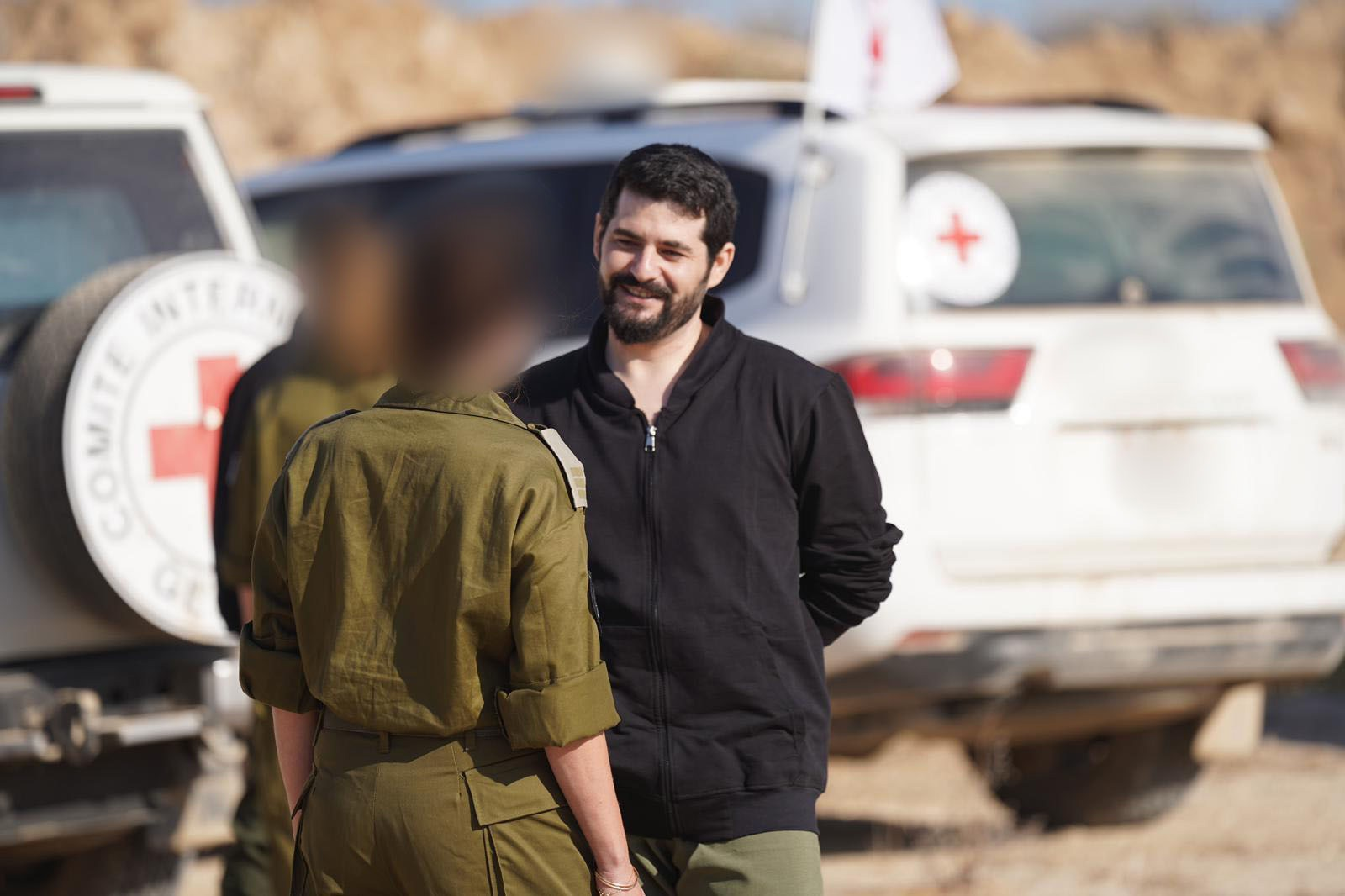
- Ziv Berman immediately after his release, 13 October 2025
- Born: 10 September 1997 (age 29)
- Known for: the Gaza war hostage crisis

Ziv Berman (Hebrew: זיו ברמן; born 10 September 1997) is an Israeli civilian who was abducted along with his fraternal twin brother, Gali, from their home in Kibbutz Kfar Aza during the Hamas-led attacks on the morning of 7 October 2023. The brothers were taken into the Gaza Strip and became among the hostages held during the Gaza war. After 738 days in captivity, they were released on 13 October 2025, together with 18 other surviving hostages, as part of the third hostage-release agreement between Israel and Hamas. The agreement also provided for the release of Palestinian prisoners in exchange for the hostages.

== Early life ==
Ziv Berman was born on 10 September 1997, to parents Talia and Doron Berman along with his twin brother, Gali, and raised in Kibbutz Kfar Aza. Their father has Parkinson's disease that deteriorated significantly during their captivity. They have a younger brother Liran. The brothers lived in adjacent homes in the kibbutz's young-adult neighborhood.

Before their abduction, the brothers worked together as lighting and sound technicians and were known supporters of the football clubs Maccabi Tel Aviv and Liverpool. The twins were described by news outlets as “Maccabi loving,” and after their return they attended their first football match together at Bloomfield Stadium, thanking supporters for their encouragement during captivity.

== Abduction ==
On the morning of 7 October 2023, during the Hamas attack on Kibbutz Kfar Aza, Ziv was in the safe room of his home when militants set the house on fire. Forced to flee, he was captured along with his brother Gali and another resident, Emily Damari and taken to the Gaza Strip. Ten days later, the Israel Defense Forces (IDF) informed the family that the brothers had likely been abducted into Gaza.

== Captivity ==
Testimonies from released hostages indicated that the Berman twins were separated during their captivity in Gaza and held in harsh conditions, including limited contact and food shortages. After about six months from their abduction, the twins were reunited and held together for two days before being separated, with reportedly a Hamas member telling them "if something happens to you two, your mother won't have to cry twice." Ziv recounted that after being led into the room and being reunited with Gali, he ran to him, hugged him and began to cry, while their captors filmed the reunion.

After his release, Ziv recounted being in an Hamas tunnel along with fellow hostage Omri Miran and having a panic attack and hyperventilating after realizing that the IDF was operating right above them. Berman believed that the captors had to begun to arm themselves around him and Miran making them believe that they might be shot and killed by their captors. To celebrate the January 2025 cease fire Berman said he and Gali, and several other hostages were taken to a beach for a barbecue by Hamas commander Izz al-Din al-Haddad and were filmed grilling meat and vegetables and ate alongside Hamas militants.

Additional accounts provided to the Hostages and Missing Families Forum reported that released captives had seen or supplied video evidence confirming the brothers' isolation and the difficult conditions in which they were held. In February 2025, the family received a proof-of-life indicating that both Ziv and Gali were alive.

== Release ==
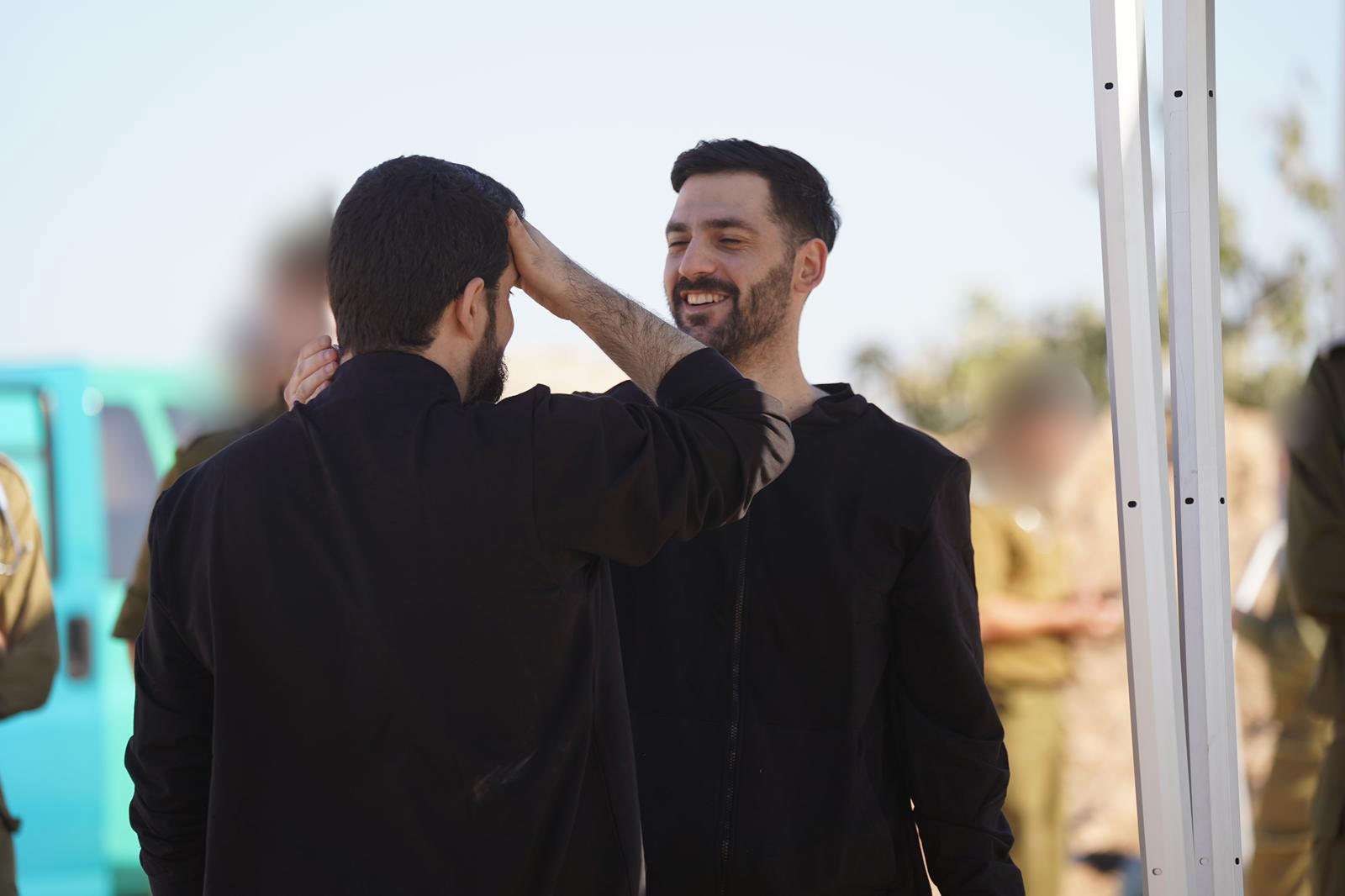
Gali and Zivi Berman reunite upon their release

After 738 days in captivity, Ziv Berman was released on 13 October 2025 together with his twin brother Gali and 18 other hostages as part of the third Israel–Hamas hostage-release agreement.

Following their return, the brothers were transported to Sheba Medical Center for medical evaluation and treatment, where they were reunited with their family along with other hostages released in the final group of 20 living captives returned under the ceasefire deal.

== Post-release activities ==
After their release, the Berman twins met with the president of Israel, Isaac Herzog. The brothers were a part of about 20 Israeli hostages that traveled to the White House and President Donald Trump to thank him for his and the United States efforts to assist in the release and support of hostages. Also, in November 2025, the brothers attended a Maccabi Tel Aviv game, and spoke to attendees prior to the game and thanked them for their support during their captivity. While speaking with reporters in January 2026 at their home in Beit Guvrin, Gali and Ziv both expressed their intent and desire to move forward, with Ziv stating that they had enough of misery for two years.

== See also ==
- List of Gaza war hostages
