= Yisrael Shomer =

Israeli military officer

- ישראל שומר
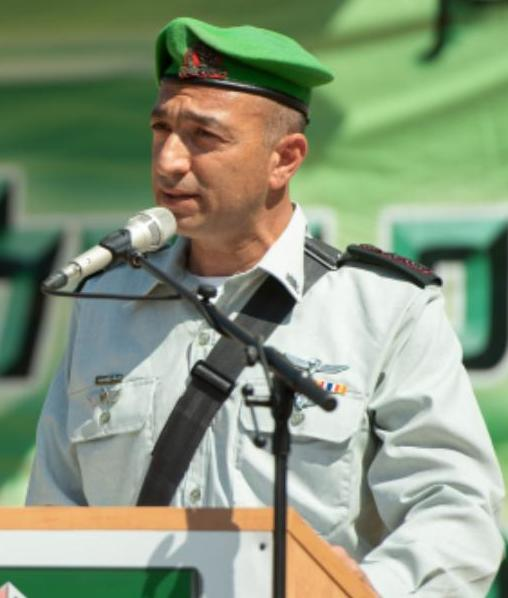
- Shomer in 2019
- Born: 30 August 1977 (age 49); Ashdod, Israel
- Military career
- Allegiance: Israel
- Branch: Israel Defense Forces
- Service years: 1995–present
- Rank: Brigadier general

Yisrael Shomer (Hebrew: ישראל שומר; born 30 August 1977) is an officer in the Israel Defense Forces with the rank of brigadier general. He currently serves as the head of the Operations Division. Previously, he served as the commander of the HaMeptz formation, the head of the operations department in the Israel Defense Forces, the commander of the Nahal Brigade, an officer of the Southern Command, head of the planning and organization department in the Israeli Ground Forces, commander of the Binyamin Brigade and commander of the Nahal DGS.

== Military career ==
In 2016, Shomer was appointed head of the planning and organization department in the Ground Forces, and served in the position until 2017, at the same time he was a trainee at the National Security College in the M.D. cycle (2016–2017). In July 2017, he was appointed as the commanding officer of the Southern Command, and served in the position until August 2019. On 15 August 2019, Shomer was appointed commander of the Nahal Brigade, in which he held until 28 June 2021. On that day, Sharon Asman was appointed as the new commander. However, three days later, on 1 July, Asman suddenly died during morning training. As a result, Shomer was issued command in which he held until 1 September 2021. In his next position, he was the head of the Operations Department at the Operations Division, holding this position until July 2023.

Shomer, a resident of kibbutz Kfar Aza, participated in the defense of the community during the Kfar Aza massacre during the October 7 attacks. After leaving his wife and children locked in their home's saferoom, he called a number of IDF generals, including Chief of Staff Herzi Halevi, and ventured outside armed with a knife to fight the attacking militants before picking up a rifle from a wounded member of the kibbutz security team. He participated in the defense of the kibbutz for hours and by his own estimation killed around 20 militants. After IDF reinforcements arrived and began wresting control of the kibbutz from the attackers and he confirmed his family was safe, he left to join his IDF unit along the border with Lebanon.

In June 2026, Shomer resigned as head of the Operations Division and retired from the Israel Defense Forces after being questioned by the Military Police Criminal Investigation Division on suspicion of morality-related offenses and misconduct. Israeli media reported that the investigation concerned allegations of an inappropriate relationship with a subordinate officer. The IDF stated that his retirement was for personal reasons.
