= Doron Libshtein =

Israeli international life coach (born 1969)

- דורון ליבשטיין
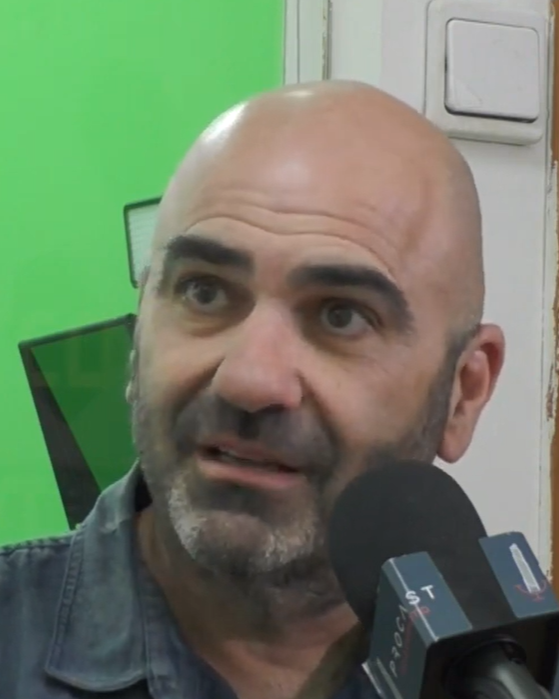
- Doron Libshtein in 2022
- Born: August 31, 1969 (age 56)
- Occupations: life coach; author; lecturer; mentor
- Years active: 1986-present
- Known for: mentoring; coaching; lecturing; writing

Doron Amitai Libshtein (Hebrew: דורון ליבשטיין; born August 31, 1969) is an Israeli international life coach, author, lecturer, and mentor. He is the founder of and chairman "Life Academy" in Tel-Aviv and the author of "The One: Everything Happens for You". Libshtein is a former senior executive at Microsoft. and served as chairman of over 24 startup companies.

== Biography ==
Doron Libshtein was born in Kfar Netter on August 31, 1969. His father was in the Israeli navy and the family moved from place to place. Due to his father's army service, the family moved to Eilat where his brother Ofir was born. The family then relocated back to Kfar Netter in 1977.

=== Career ===
From 1993 to 2006 Libshtein worked as a senior executive for Microsoft. Before ending his tenure at Microsoft, Libshtein founded "The Mentors Channel" in 2005, serving until 2020. From 2015 until 2020 Libshtein served as chairman of "WellBe Digital".

=== Life coach, author, and mentor ===
After serving as a senior executive at Microsoft, Libshtein decided to shift his focus towards the advancement of wellbeing throughout the world and has become a world-renowned mentor who has studied and trained alongside leading spiritual teachers, including Deepak Chopra, Robin Sharma, Robert Kiyosaki, and Byron Katie.

In May 2023, Libshtein established "Life Academy" in Tel-Aviv, an academic institution that focuses on individual empowerment, self realization, community, and tikun olam.

=== The October 7th attacks and Commemoration of his brother Ofir ===
On October 7, 2023, Doron's younger brother, Ofir Libstein, was killed by Hamas militants during the Kfar Aza massacre as part of the October 7 attacks. Libstein was a member of the regional council's local security team. Ofir's 19-year-old son Nitzan was also killed in the massacre. Nitzan was considered missing until his body was found 12 days later.

In June 2024, Doron Libshtein established the "Or Ofir Foundation" in memory of his brother Ofir. The foundation focuses on developing Jewish and Zionist leadership in Israel and throughout the world, cultivation of resilience and leadership, cultivating Jewish leadership, cultivating ties between Israel and the diaspora.

== Books ==
- The One: Everything Happens for You (Hebrew: THE ONE - הכל קורה עבורך)
- Light and Goodness Will Prevail (Hebrew: האור והטוב ינצחו)
- Reaching High - A Couple's Journey To Fulfillment - Work (Hebrew: בדרך למעלה: מסע זוגי להגשמה) (2013) ISBN 978-1493579693
