= Ofir Libstein =

Israeli politician (1973–2023)

- אופיר ליבשטיין
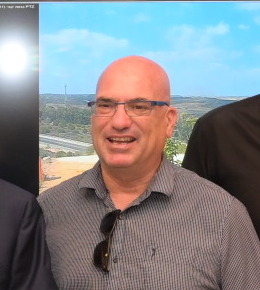
- Libstein in 2022

Head of the Sha'ar HaNegev Regional Council
- In office 2018 – 7 October 2023
- Preceded by: Alon Schuster

Personal details
- Born: 1973 Eilat, Israel
- Died: 7 October 2023 (aged 49–50)

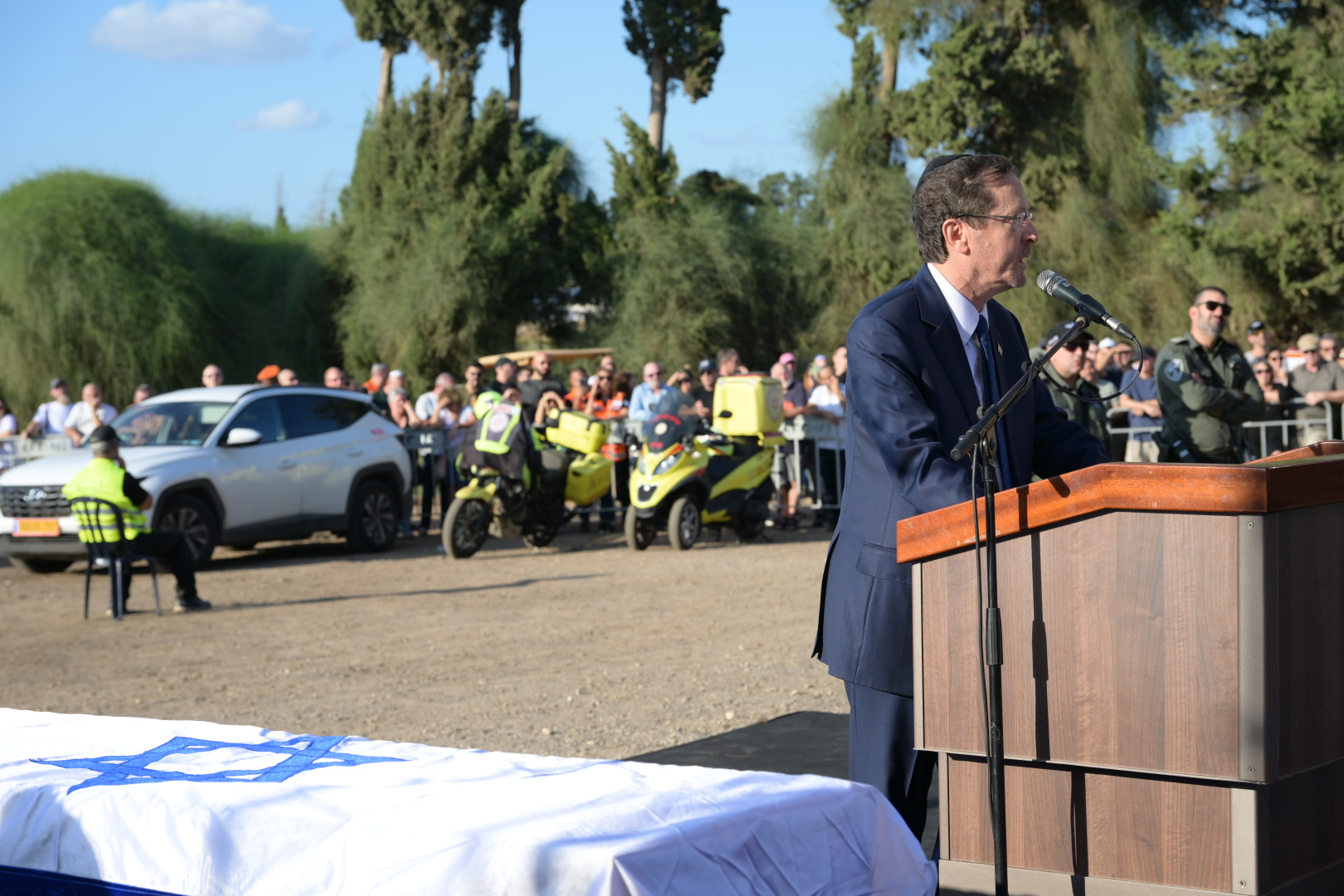
President Herzog delivers eulogy at Ofir Liebstein's funeral, October 18, 2023

Ofir Libstein (Hebrew: אופיר ליבשטיין; 1973 – 7 October 2023) was an Israeli politician. He served as head of the Sha'ar HaNegev Regional Council from 2018 to 2023. Libstein was killed in the Kfar Aza massacre in part of the attack which sparked the Gaza war.

== Biography ==
Libstein was born in Eilat, where his parents lived due to his father's military service. At the age of 4, his parents returned to Kfar Netter, where they lived before. He eventually moved back to Kfar Aza. Libstein studied in WIZO Canada Children's Village. He served in the IDF as a medic and as an instructor in the Medical Corps. He was involved in the establishment of e-commerce sites. Libstein was a kibbutznik and lived in Kfar Aza or Kfar Neter for most of his life.

In 2007, Libstein and his wife founded the Darom Adom (lit. 'Red South') festival in early spring.

In 2017, Libstein was made head of the Kibbutzim Industrial Union, and aimed to create more IT industry in Kibbutzim. He was also a chairman of Habonim Dror.

=== Head of Regional Council ===
Libstein was elected to a five-year term as head of the Sha'ar HaNegev Regional Council in 2018, defeating Nira Shpak, Israel's first female brigade commander, with a majority of 68.31%.

As the mayoral-equivalent of the regional council, Libstein led approximately 6,000 people living in 10 kibbutzim and one communal farm. During his tenure, Hamas rockets fired from Gaza were regularly intercepted by the Iron Dome, and incendiary devices sent from Gaza during the 2018–2019 Gaza border protests fell on his region for 11 consecutive days.

During his five years as mayor, 40 companies relocated to the regional council's new enterprise zone. In partnership with Sderot, Libstein planned the Arazim industrial zone near the Erez crossing that would enable up to 10,000 Gazans to work in Israel every day. Arazim would also provide training, education, and medical treatment to Gazans. Libstein believed that Gazans would have such a stake in Arazim that they would not attack it.

== Personal life and death ==
Libstein was married to Vered and had four children.

On October 7, 2023, Libstein was killed by Hamas militants during the Kfar Aza massacre as part of the October 7 attacks. Libstein was a member of the regional council's local security team. His 19-year-old son Nitzan was also killed in massacre. Nitzan was considered missing until his body was found 12 days later.

Mayor of San Diego Todd Gloria, whose city was a sister city with Sha'ar Hanegev paid tribute to Libstein on behalf of the city of San Diego. Former mayor Kevin Faulconer and San Diego Police Department chief Shelley Zimmerman publicly shared that Libstein "was a wonderful man."

== Tributes ==
During the Israeli invasion of Gaza, Israeli soldiers in Beit Hanoun in Gaza discovered Hamas tunnels connected to a civilian home. The troops' team leader, who was Libstein's nephew, dedicated the demolishing of the tunnels to Libstein.

In June 2024, Ofir's brother, Doron Libshtein, established the "Or Ofir Foundation" in memory of his brother Ofir. The foundation focuses on developing Jewish and Zionist leadership in Israel and throughout the world, cultivation of resilience and leadership, cultivating Jewish leadership, cultivating ties between Israel and the diaspora.

In November, the Israeli government announced that a new community built in the Negev would be named Ofir, after Libstein. The naming decision was made by Israeli Prime Minister Benjamin Netanyahu and Israeli housing minister Yitzhak Goldknopf.

On December 18, 2023, the Habonim Dror movement, of which Libstein was chairman before his murder, inaugurated the Or Ofir Foundation in honor of Libstein. The foundation would build on Libstein's commitment to community building and leadership. Former acting Israeli Prime Minister Tzipi Livni, among other, is on the foundation's board of directors.
