= Kfar Aza massacre =

2023 massacre in Israel

- Part of the October 7 attacks
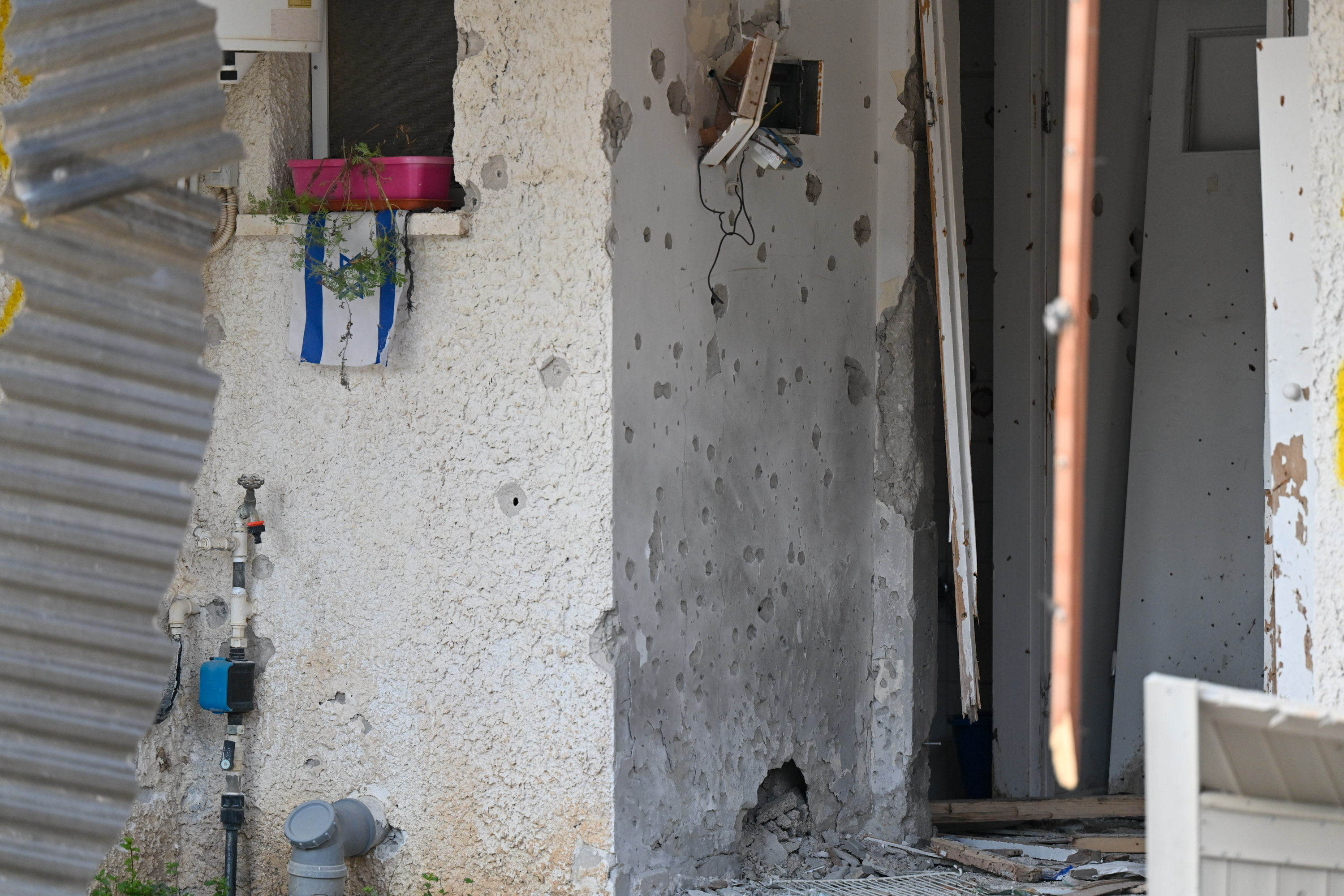
- Kfar Aza family home after the attack

- Site of the attack in Israel
- Location: 31°29′1″N 34°32′2″E; Kfar Aza, Southern District, Israel
- Date: 7 October 2023; 3 years ago
- Attack type: Mass shooting, mass murder, decapitation, dismemberment, immolation
- Deaths: 80 Israelis (including 24 security forces); 150+ Palestinian militants
- Perpetrators: (Palestine) Palestinian Joint Operations Room: al-Qassam Brigades; National Resistance Brigades (Note: Claimed partial responsibility for the attacks.)

On 7 October 2023, around 250 Hamas and other Palestinian militants attacked Kfar Aza, an Israeli kibbutz (cooperative community) about 3 kilometers (1.9 mi) from the border with the Gaza Strip, massacring residents and abducting hostages. It took two days for the Israel Defense Forces (IDF) to regain full control of the area, by which point at least 62 residents had been killed, while a further 19 were taken hostage.

The attack quickly gained notoriety as a result of war crimes documented by survivor testimonies, forensic evidence, and captured militants footage. Hamas militants engaged in several violations of combatant distinctions under international law, including shooting civilians taking shelter in safe rooms, sexually assaulting hostages. Militants shot victims inside their homes. A widely circulated claim that militants had decapitated 40 babies at the kibbutz was later shown to be false.

Prior to the massacre, the Kibbutz had 950 residents.

== Massacre ==
=== Initial Hamas invasion ===
According to the IDF, around 250 Palestinians attacked the kibbutz on the morning of 7 October 2023, consisting of between 120 and 165 militants from Hamas's Nukhba forces and 80 other Hamas, Palestinian Islamic Jihad, and unaffiliated militants. Another Palestinian militant group, the Maoist DFLP, also declared that its troops (organized as National Resistance Brigades) were fighting the IDF in Kfar Aza. The first six militants entered the kibbutz using paragliders at 6:42 a.m. under the cover of rocket fire from Gaza. A minute later, militants created a breach in the Gaza–Israel barrier fence that would be used to attack Kfar Aza. Hamas militants in pickup trucks entered the kibbutz at 6:50 a.m. through two entrances in the north and southwest, while others arrived on motorbikes.

Moments earlier, three patrol vehicles belonging to the Israel Defense Forces were ordered to respond to the attack. One vehicle was ambushed while driving to Kfar Aza, while the other two came under fire in Sderot. An Israeli tank was stationed outside the kibbutz at 7:25 a.m. and opened fire at militants approaching the community, but did not enter as it was ordered to fight elsewhere.

=== Battle and massacre ===
After entering the kibbutz, which was 3 kilometers (1.9 mi) from Gaza, the militants proceeded to massacre residents. The Islamist militants began by targeting the west side of the community—an area in the kibbutz close to Gaza—where families with young children lived. They captured the entire kibbutz within the first hour of the attack. Hamas militants broadened the attack to all four directions. Militants burned houses and killed civilian residents. The corpses of those who had lived in the area were found with their hands tied.

A survivor, Avidor Schwartzman, described how he hid with his wife and one-year-old daughter in their safe room for over 20 hours until their rescue by Israeli soldiers.

"There were bodies everywhere. Dead bodies everywhere," the 38-year-old said. "We saw our little piece of paradise, our little piece of heaven, was totally burnt – burnt and with blood everywhere".

In addition, the militants took 19 hostages from the kibbutz. The Associated Press visually confirmed four hostages who were abducted on 7 October. The militants took women, children and senior citizens among the hostages back to Gaza. The kidnappings, which took place between 10:30 a.m. and noon, mostly occurred in the kibbutz's "young generation" neighborhood, which was meant for young families. The IDF only managed to enter it at 12:50 p.m. after the abductions had concluded.

The kibbutz's security team of 14 personnel, which included Sha'ar Hanegev Regional Council head Ofir Libstein, retrieved weapons from the armory in an attempt to defend the community. The team battled the invading militants but had ceased functioning as a unit by 8:10 a.m. after seven of its members, including Libstein, were killed and one was wounded. The head of the security team, Tal Eilon was killed after managing to kill three militants together with his father. IDF Brigadier General Yisrael Shomer, a resident of the kibbutz, set out to defend the kibbutz after updating other generals, including Chief of Staff Herzi Halevi, on what was happening, initially using a knife before taking a gun from a wounded member of the security team and maneuvering around the kibbutz while firing at militants he encountered. His brother-in-law, kibbutz resident Yuval Salomon, also managed to stab a militant before being killed.

A group of 18 soldiers from the Golani Brigade's 13th Battalion entered the kibbutz at 8:33 a.m. in a Namer armored personnel carrier. By then, 37 residents of the kibbutz had been killed. They began to search homes in the southern neighborhoods of the kibbutz and engaged in several exchanges of fire with militants. At 8:40 a.m. a group of five soldiers entered the kibbutz, followed by another group of soldiers and police officers at 9:44 a.m. At 9:50 a.m. additional militants entered the kibbutz by breaching the security fence near the "young generation" neighborhood.

By 10 a.m., there were around 250 militants and 30 security personnel present in Kfar Aza. As the attack progressed, Israeli soldiers from a total of 24 units entered the kibbutz, including commandos from various special forces units. Additional police forces also entered the kibbutz. The IDF's Gaza Division, which was responsible for the area, had been overrun by Hamas, resulting in little coordination between troops. For the first day the forces in the kibbutz operated without effective command and control. Even by the evening of 7 October many were still operating independently without clear orders from the IDF Southern Command or General Staff. The lack of coordination resulted in a delay in an organized evacuation, leaving residents trapped in their safe rooms for extended periods of time. Soldiers conducting house-to-house searches told kibbutz residents they encountered to remain in their safe rooms. In some instances, militants reached the residents after the soldiers had left.

At 10:35 a.m., a Duvdevan Unit soldier was killed, one was mortally wounded, and four were injured during a shootout between buildings, and four Sayeret Matkal commandos were killed at 10:30 a.m. after being shot at from within a home. Between 8:30 a.m. and 12:00 p.m. 18 residents were killed. In one case, Duvdevan soldiers mistakenly killed a man who stepped out of a house with a shotgun after mistaking him for a militant. At 11 a.m., Brigadier General Dan Goldfuss, the commander of the IDF's 98th Paratroopers Division, arrived at the kibbutz and stayed there for about an hour before leaving to check on other nearby communities. While there he ordered Colonel Omer Cohen, the commander of the Oz Brigade, to take charge of operations inside the kibbutz. However, the efforts to establish command and control had little effect at this stage.

Fighting in the kibbutz continued throughout the rest of the day. At 5:00 p.m., Colonel Liron Batito, the commander of the Givati Brigade, began assigning combat sectors within the kibbutz. At 5:52 p.m., Israeli soldiers opened fire at a vehicle that had been commandeered by militants and was driving toward them, killing a hostage, Eliyahu Orgad, who was inside. At 6 p.m., three tanks were sent to Kfar Aza, which still had 50–100 militants at the time. At the same time, Israeli Air Force helicopters and drones were carrying out airstrikes in the area, mostly along the security perimeter of the kibbutz. By 6:30 p.m., 765 Israeli soldiers were inside the kibbutz. Seven residents and eight soldiers were killed between 12:00 and 6:30 p.m. At 11 p.m., the IDF began an organized evacuation of the residents. At 11:30 p.m., an officer from the Maglan commando unit created the "Kfar Aza Command & Control" WhatsApp group and added the commanders of dozens of units fighting in the kibbutz to better coordinate operations.

=== Further clashes ===
By night, around 1,000 soldiers were in Kfar Aza, while 50 militants remained barricaded inside houses. It took the IDF two and a half days to regain full control of the kibbutz after the initial attack. The paratroopers of Unit 71 led the assault to retake the area.

On 8 October, a soldier from the Givati Brigade was killed during a shootout with militants. By 8 a.m., on October 8, some 60% of kibbutz residents had been evacuated but hundreds remained trapped. Fighting continued throughout the day, with the combat zones becoming increasingly contained. By 9 October, 10–20 militants remained at the kibbutz. That day, a soldier from the Nahal Brigade was killed during combat. On the morning of 9 October, Shayetet 13 naval commandos were tasked with rescuing the residents still barricaded in their safe rooms. On 10 October, the final phase of the evacuation took place and troops conducted sweeps to find the last remaining militants. By the afternoon, an order was given for all active combat units to withdraw and soldiers of the 55th Paratroopers Brigade moved in to secure the kibbutz. The last combat incident took place at 6 p.m., when soldiers of the 55th Brigade's 28th Battalion spotted and killed the last Hamas fighter, who was wounded and still clutching a knife.

== Casualties ==
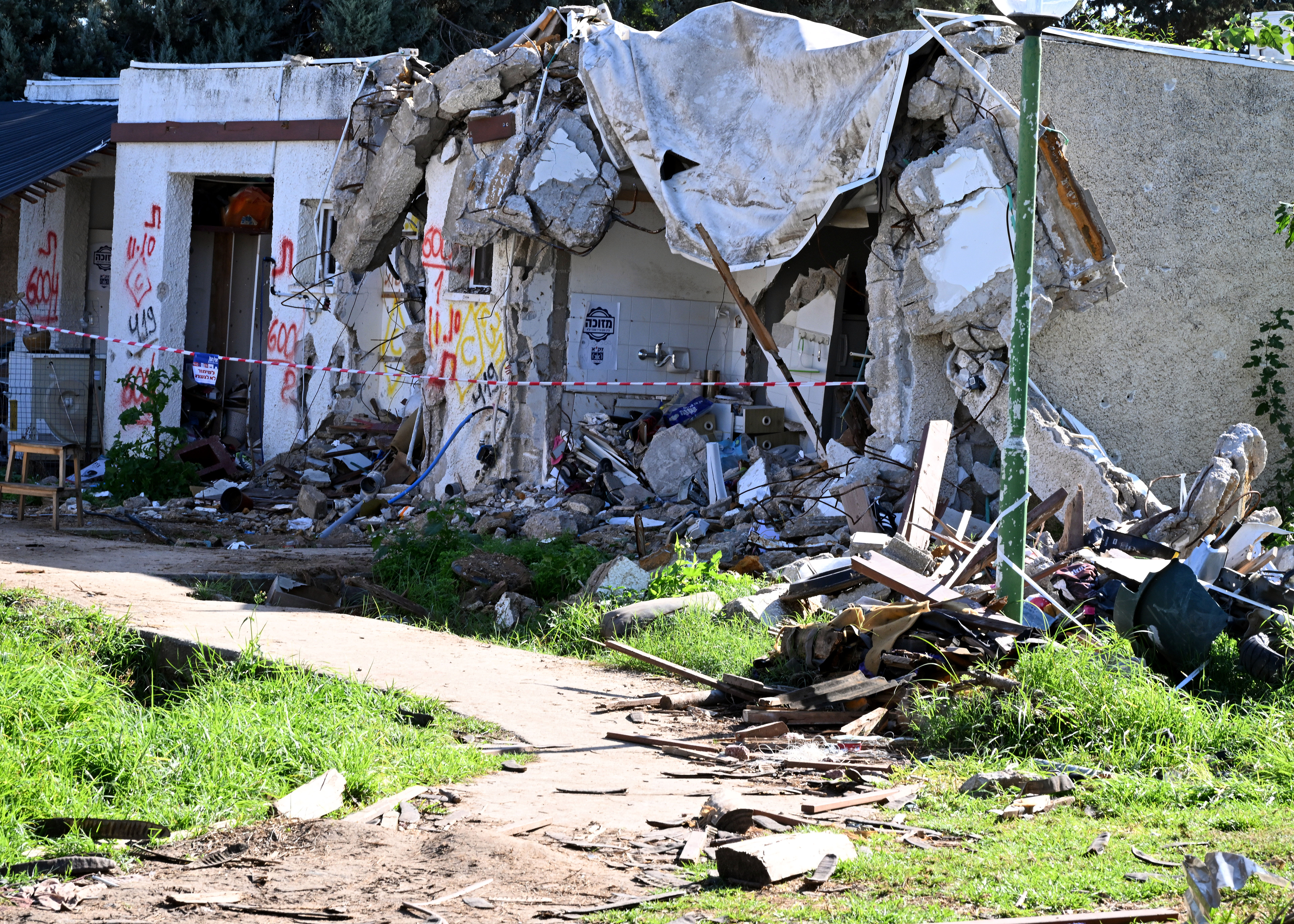
Exterior of buildings showing damage from attack during visit from US Senator Lindsey Graham in January 2024

According to BBC News, most of the victims of the massacre died in the opening hours of the attack. As of 10 October 2023, soldiers were still going through the community to recover bodies. According to one soldier present, several civilians had been beheaded. Other victims were dismembered or burned. Children and babies were initially reported to be among the killed. By late 2024, the number of deaths was reported as either 62 or 79, with 18 or 19 abducted to Gaza. An IDF probe of the massacre presented in March 2025 reported that 62 kibbutz residents, including five soldiers and a Shin Bet member, and an additional 18 security forces were killed, while 19 civilians were abducted.

In the aftermath of the initial Hamas assault, witnesses from the IDF and the first responder organization ZAKA told i24news that they had seen the bodies of beheaded infants at the site of the Kfar Aza massacre. During Antony Blinken's visit to Israel, he said he was shown photos of the massacre by Hamas of Israeli civilians and soldiers, and specifically that he saw beheaded IDF soldiers. U.S. President Biden separately said that he had seen photographic evidence of terrorists beheading children, but the White House later clarified that Biden was alluding to news reports of beheadings, which have not contained or referred to photographic evidence.

A ZAKA volunteer reported on 14 October that he had seen children's bodies with severe injuries and burns. Some of the bodies appeared to have been decapitated, but the exact circumstances were not clear. On 24 October, Israeli authorities screened body cam footage of Hamas atrocities for journalists, including "an attempt to decapitate someone who appeared to be still alive using a garden hoe", as well as a still image of a decapitated IDF soldier. The locations of these attacks were not specified in the reporting.

An allegation of "40 beheaded babies" spread widely on social media in the days immediately following the massacre, which was later found to be false. On 4 December, Haaretz reported that "unverified stories [had been] disseminated by Israeli search and rescue groups, army officers and even Sara Netanyahu". Haaretz journalists Nir Hasson and Liza Rozovsky related the chronology of the news items about "beheaded babies" and "hung babies" and concluded, "this story is false". They quoted Ishay Coen, a journalist for the ultra-Orthodox website Kikar Hashabbat, who admitted he made a mistake by unquestioningly accepting the IDF's claims. "Why would an army officer invent such a horrifying story?", Hashabbat asked, adding, "I was wrong". Haaretz also reported that some testimony came from reservist officers.

An investigation into the October 7th attack by the Independent International Commission of Inquiry on the Occupied Palestinian Territory of the United Nations Human Rights Council probed the reports of sexual violence in Kfar Aza. It found that while the reports sexual violence at Kfar Aza cannot be verified, female victims found undressed, bound and shot may be indicative of sexual violence.

About 150 Palestinian militants were killed in the fighting inside and near the kibbutz and three more were captured alive. Of the dead, 101 militants were inside Kfar Aza, and 50 were around the kibbutz. Another militant who was identified as a participant in the attack was later killed during the invasion of Gaza.

== Aftermath ==
On October 14, one week after the massacre, a vigil by a survivor of the Kfar Aza Massacre grew into a protest which attracted hundreds of participants, calling for the return of the 17 Kfar Aza residents kidnapped by Hamas during the attack, as well as the resignation of Benjamin Netanyahu. Another protest organized by survivors took place on October 26.

Kfar Aza massacre survivor Ziv Stahl, executive director of the human rights organization Yesh Din, strongly opposed calls to exact revenge in an article for Haaretz, arguing that, "Indiscriminate bombing in Gaza and the killing of civilians uninvolved with these horrible crimes are no solution".

Israeli Major General Itai Veruv described the massacre as a terror attack. Hamas has also released video footage of the attack. Journalists were granted access to the site on 10 October 2023. In December 2023 it was reported that actress Debra Messing and journalist Douglas Murray toured the site of the massacre and met with survivors during their trip to Israel.

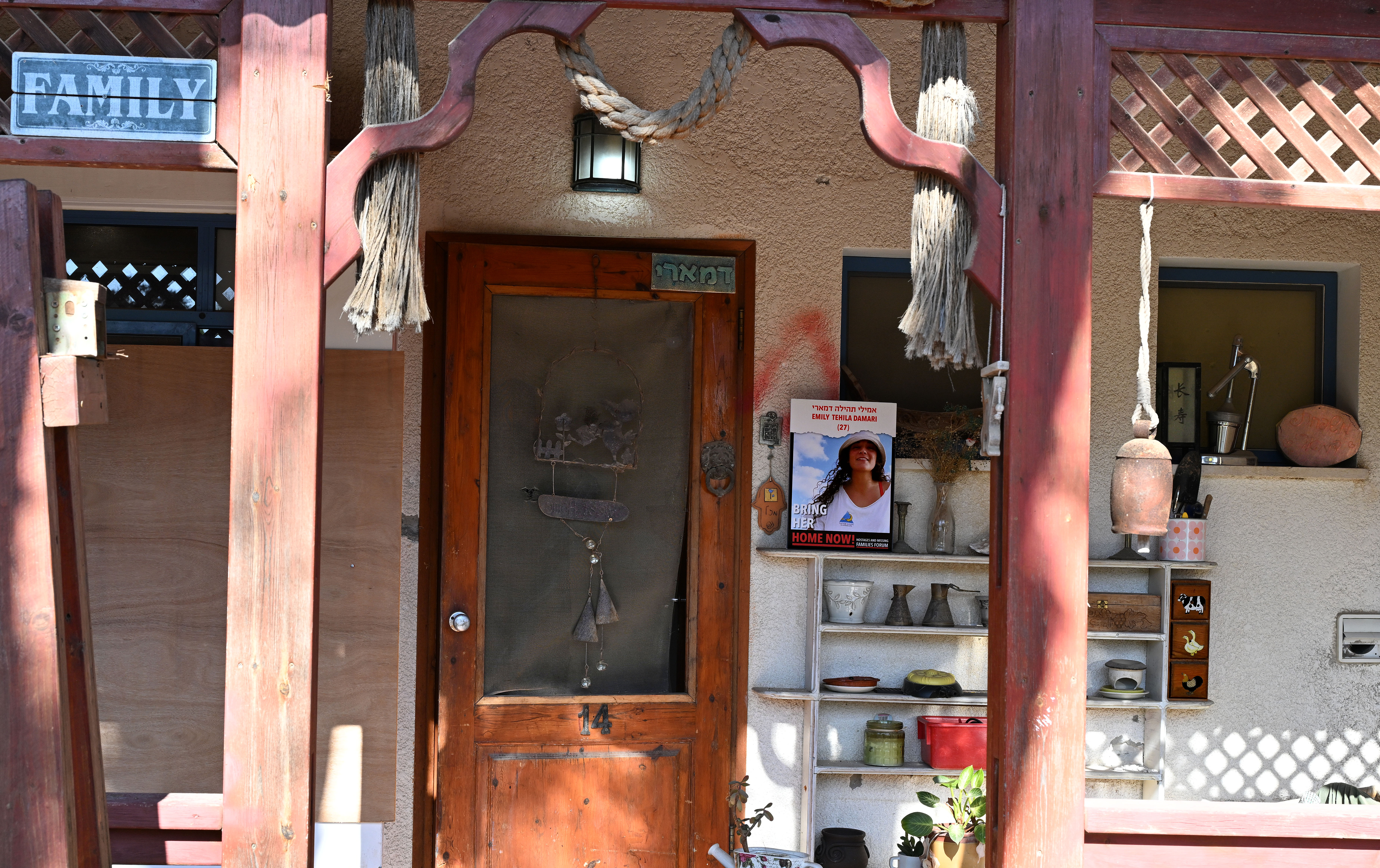
Exterior of home in Kfar Aza kibbutz showing hostage poster during visit from US Senator Lindsey Graham in January 2024

The kibbutz has become a place of pilgrimage, military ceremonies and tourism by visitors to Israel and Israeli citizens, with at least one resident speaking out about the practice. She told reporters that items were being taken from peoples homes and buildings, along with some not respecting the area and history, after finding two IDF soldiers taking selfies in her home when she came to collect items. A visitor to the site expressed discomfort walking through the empty streets and stated that many homes had giant banners with the names and pictures of their residents along with their status after the attacks.

In 2025 the memorial "Ketav Vashem" (Writing and name) dedicated to the terrorist attack's victims was opened at Kfar Aza.

== See also ==
- List of military engagements during the Gaza war
- Outline of the Gaza war
- Misinformation in the Gaza war
- Palestinian political violence
- Moshe Dayan's eulogy for Ro'i Rothberg
