= Merkhav Mugan =

Israeli air raid shelter

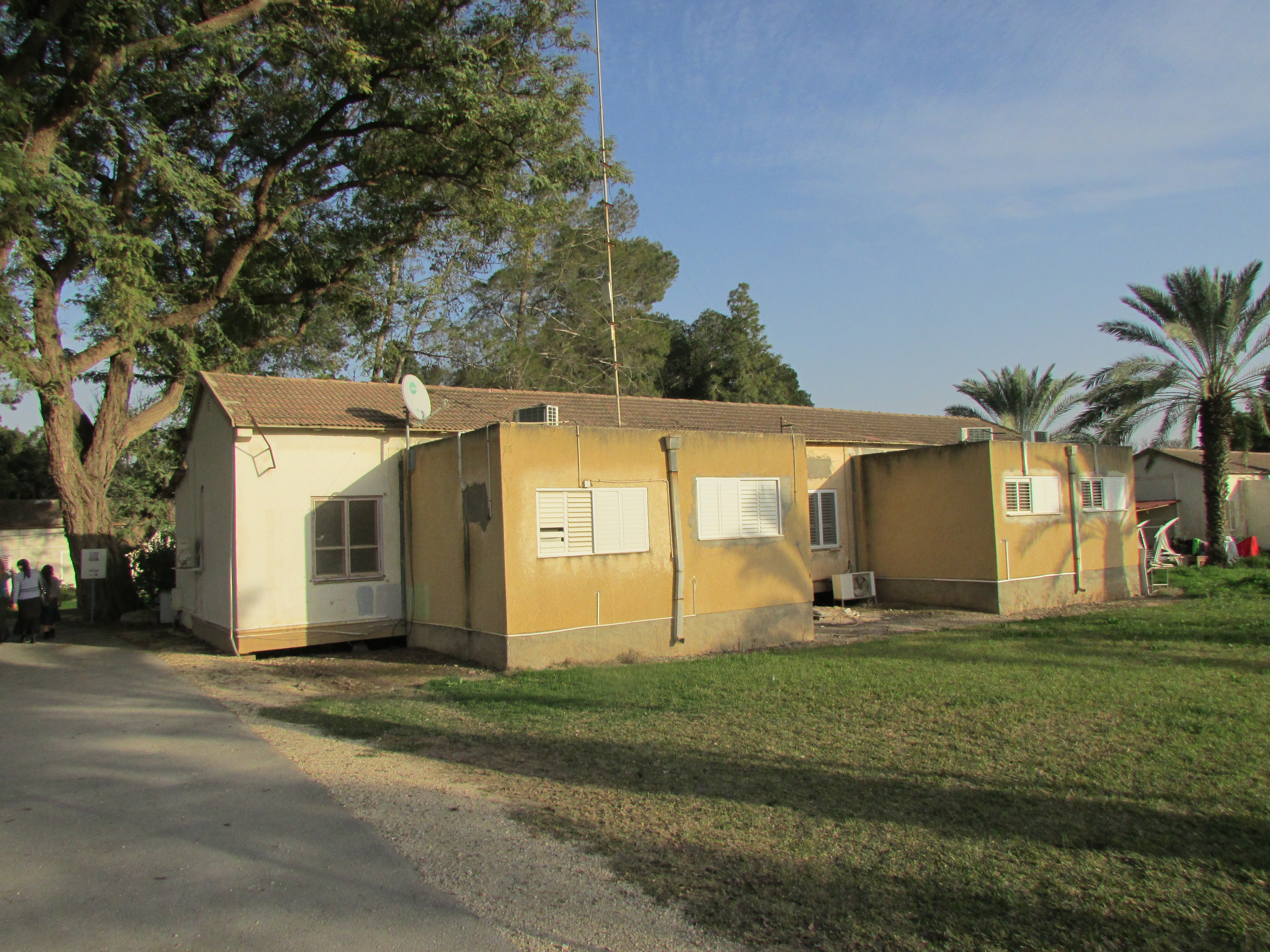
An old one-storey kibbutz house with added fortified rooms

Merkhav Mugan (Hebrew: מרחב מוגן, lit. 'protected space') is a reinforced security room offering protection against high impact projectiles and chemical weapons, required in all new buildings by Israeli law. A Merkhav Mugan can either be part of an individual apartment, or service parts of or an entire residential, office or other building. It is deemed preferable to a public bomb shelter, known as a "miklat" (Hebrew: מקלט, lit. 'shelter'), when the warning time is too short for residents to reach a shelter, which may be located some distance away.

== History ==
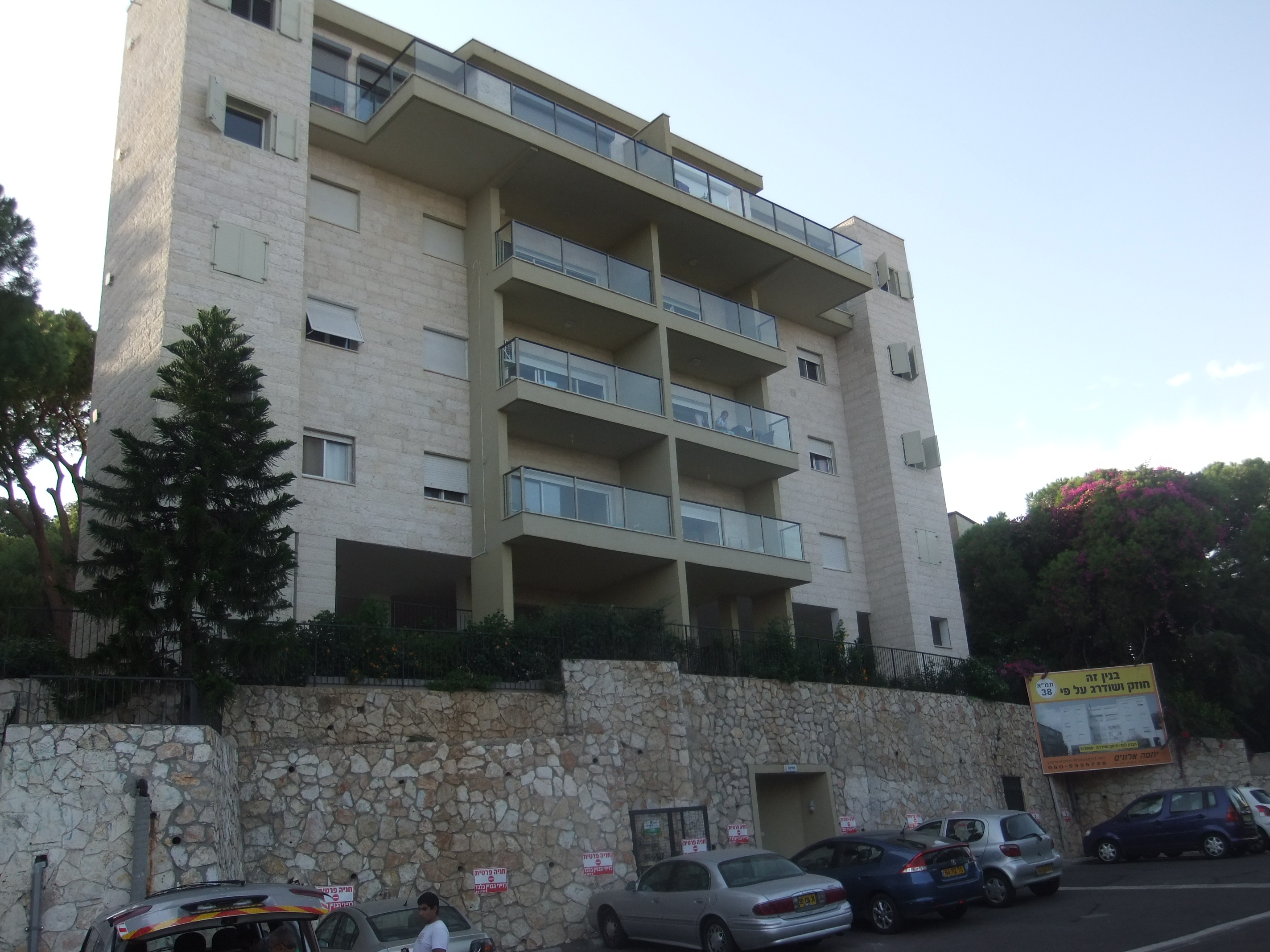
A building in Haifa reinforced in accordance with Tama 38

Security rooms are based on a 1951 civil defense law that has undergone several revisions. After Israel was attacked by Scud missiles in the Gulf War, the Israeli Home Front Command established new guidelines for civil defense. In 1992, technical specifications were drawn up for designated protected spaces in family homes. The Merkhav Mugan can withstand blast and shrapnel from conventional weapons, and offers protection against chemical and biological weapons. It has reinforced concrete walls and ceilings, 20 to 30 centimetres (7.9 to 11.8 in) thick floors, and airtight steel doors and windows.

== Types ==
- Miklat Tzibury (מקלט ציבורי, lit. "public shelter"), commonly called "Miklat" – a partly underground facility, installed in residential areas. They are commonly used for community needs (clubs, education etc.). Maintained by the local governance and Home Front. They are located in streets and near public facilities.

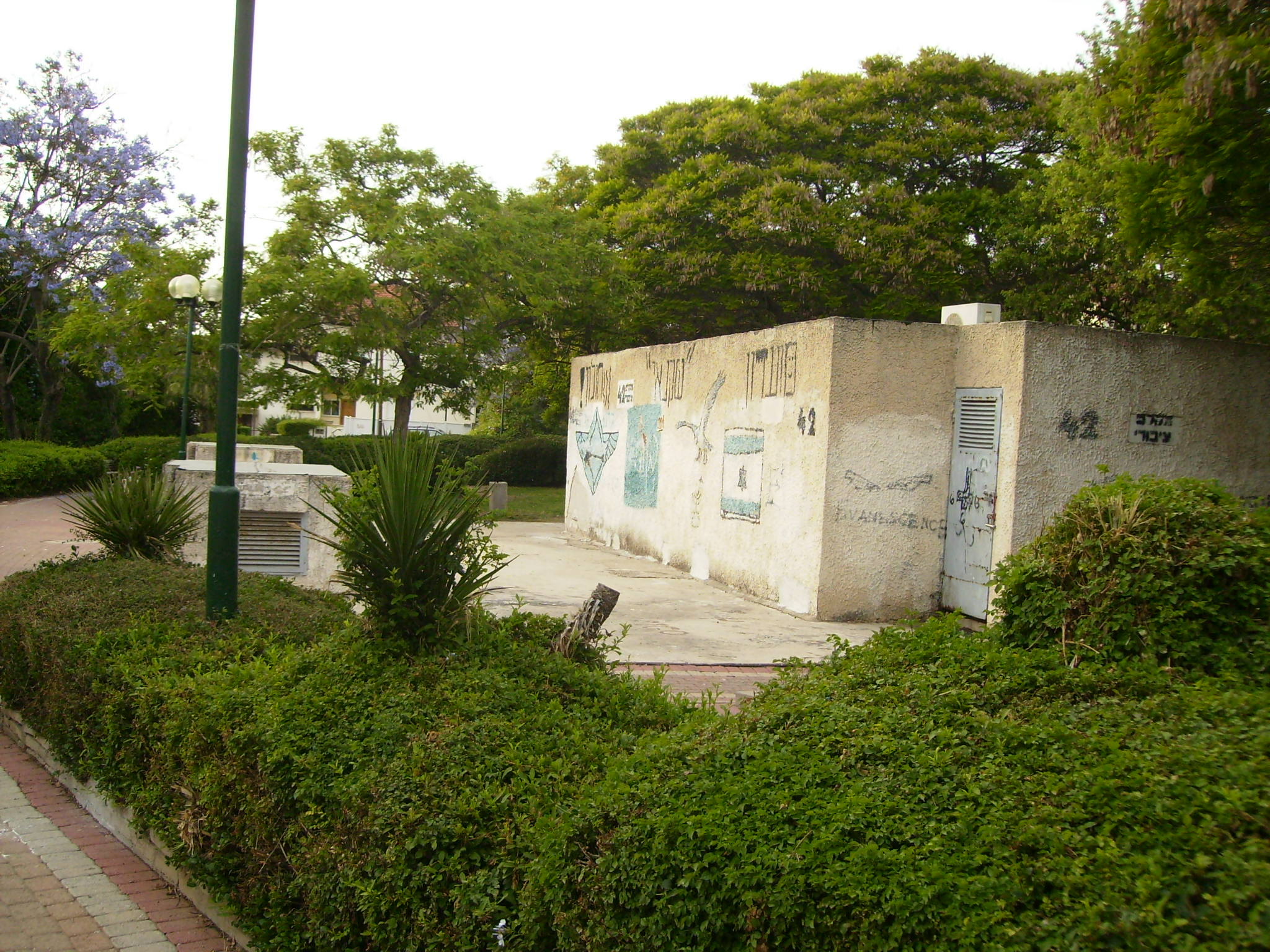
Public miklat in Holon

- Miklat BeBayit Meshutaf (מקלט בבית משותף, lit. "shelter in a condominium") – a facility built into a building functioning as a condominium (commonly a low-rise building). It includes all the facilities of a public shelter, but is maintained by the residents themselves.
- Merkhav Mugan Dirati (מרחב מוגן דירתי), commonly used acronym ממ״ד, "Mamad" – installed in residential apartments and private houses.

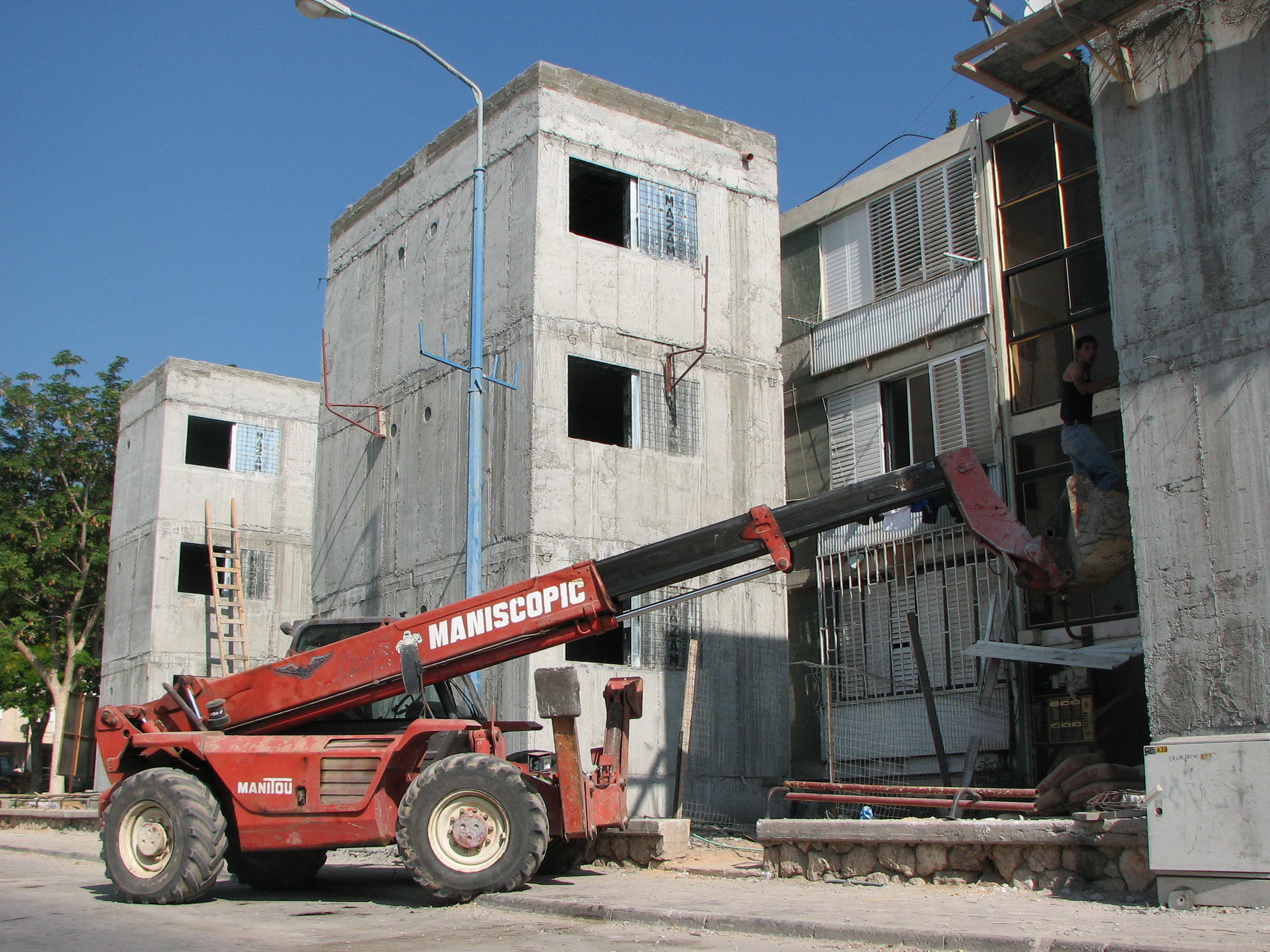
Building of Merhav Mugan Dirati-type fortified rooms in Sderot as an addition to an existing apartment building, for protection against Qassam rockets from Gaza

- Merkhav Mugan Komati (מרחב מוגן קומתי, lit. "floor-level protected space"), commonly used acronym ממ״ק, "Mamak" – common floor space in apartment buildings in which there is no Merkhav Mugan Dirati in every apartment and in other multi-story buildings (mostly offices and industry).
- Merkhav Mugan Mosadi (מרחב מוגן מוסדי, lit. "institutional protected space"), commonly used acronym ממ״מ, "Mamam" – installed in every public structure.

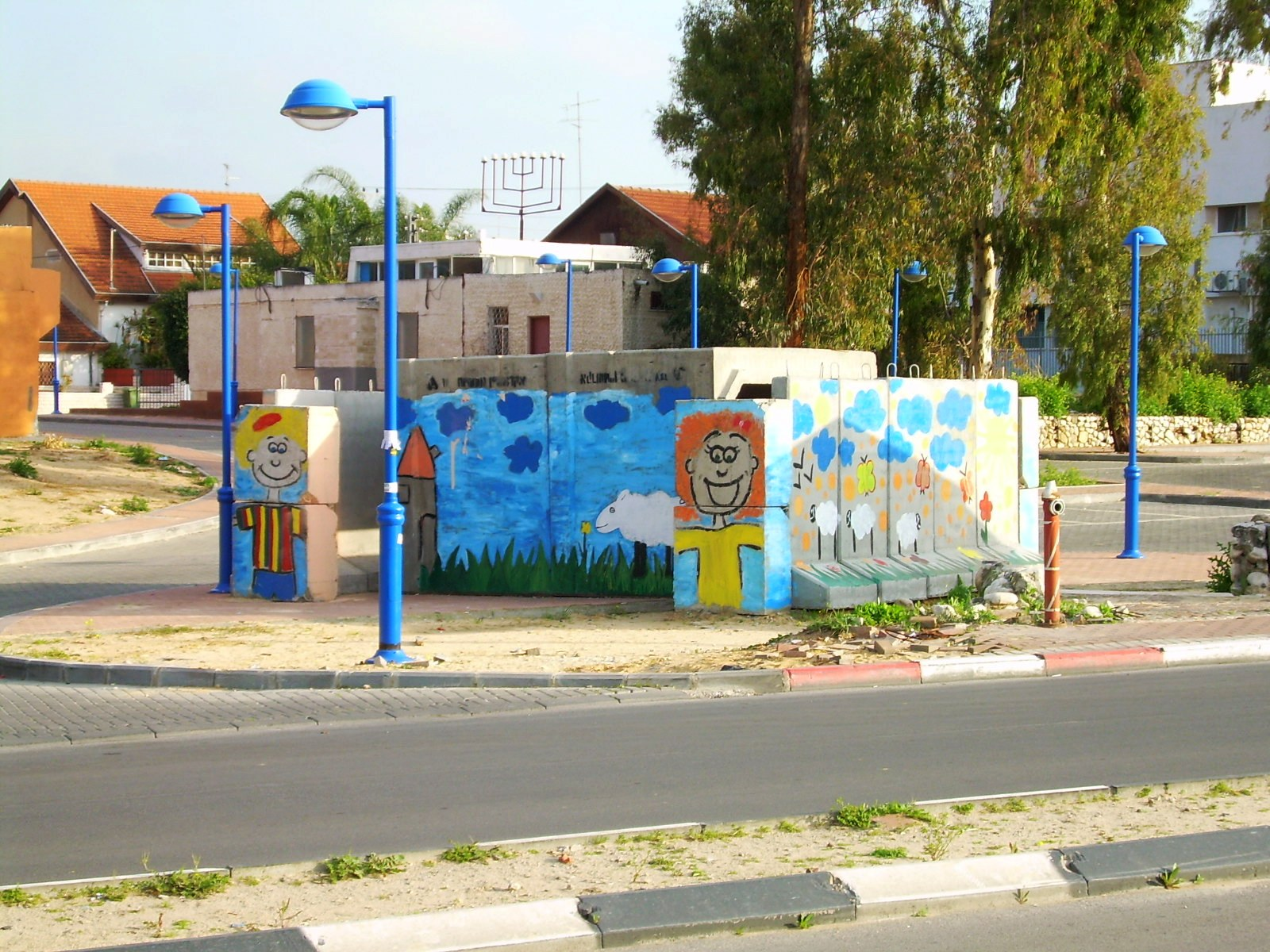
Entrance of public shelter in Sderot, Israel

- Migunit (מיגונית), lit. small shelter – concrete structure used as a common alternative to standard shelters in places where such could not be built. It is intended to protect from bombs but not from earthquakes. The standard Migunit has a rectangular shelter room accessed through a covered entrance space.

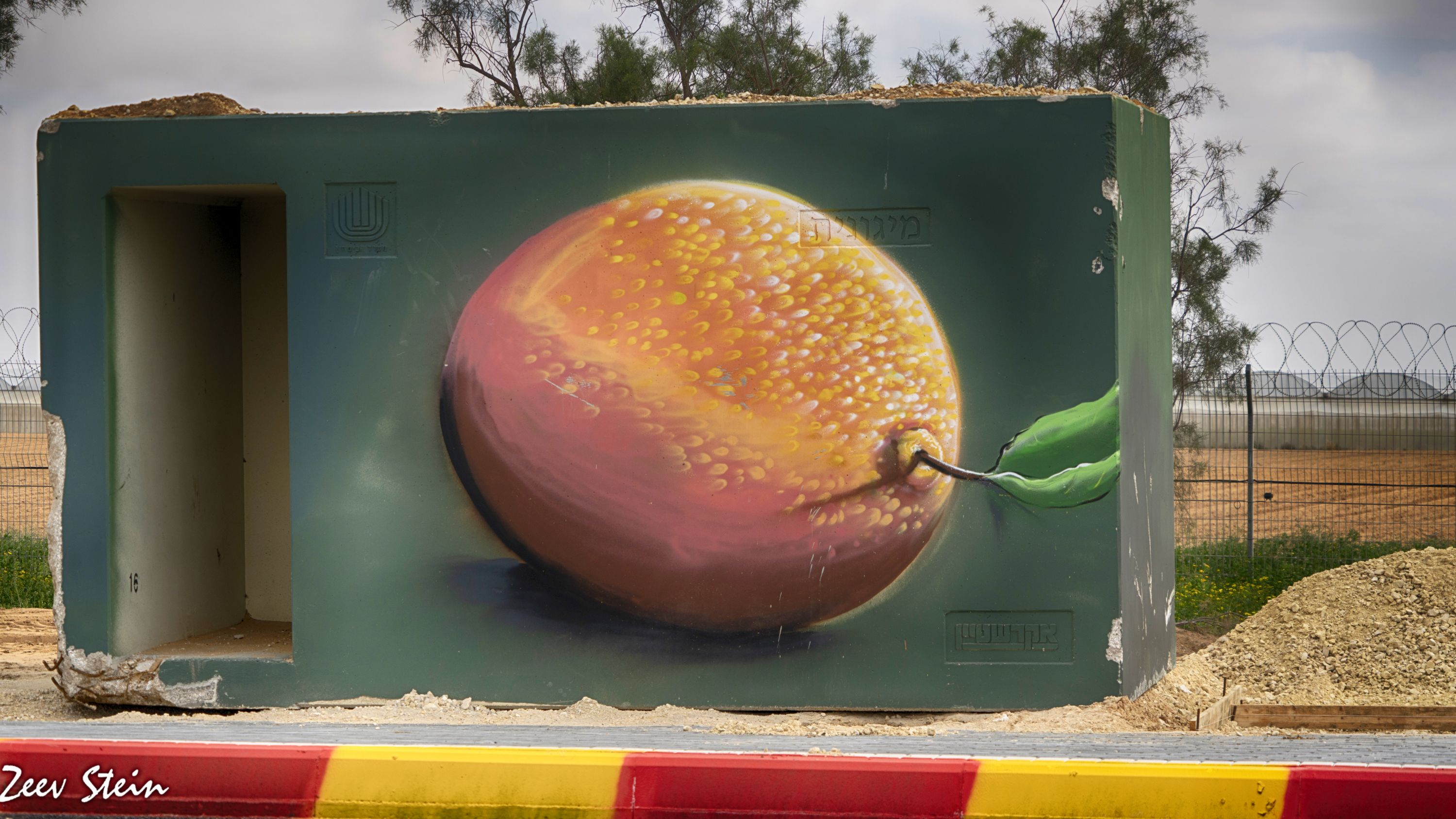
Migunit with artwork

== Sociological and cultural context ==
Beyond its functional and legal requirements, the Mamad has become an integral part of the Israeli cultural landscape and domestic life. Unlike the Swiss model of civil defense—which primarily relies on communal below-ground shelters—the Israeli approach focuses on bringing protection into the private living space of the individual. This unique concept reflects a foundational Zionist ethos articulated by Israel's first Prime Minister, David Ben-Gurion: "The whole nation is an army; the whole land is a front".

While providing a vital sense of security, the Mamad presents distinct daily challenges. Due to its reinforced concrete structure and heavy steel fixtures, these rooms often suffer from poor cellular and Wi-Fi reception, as well as significant temperature regulation issues. Despite these architectural drawbacks, the Mamad is viewed by Israeli citizens as a "concrete sanctuary" that has successfully shifted from the neglected public miklat (shelter) of the pre-1990s era to a central, life-saving component of the modern Israeli home.

== See also ==
- Architecture of Israel
