= Kfar Aza =

Kibbutz in southern Israel

Kfar Aza: כפר עזה (Hebrew)
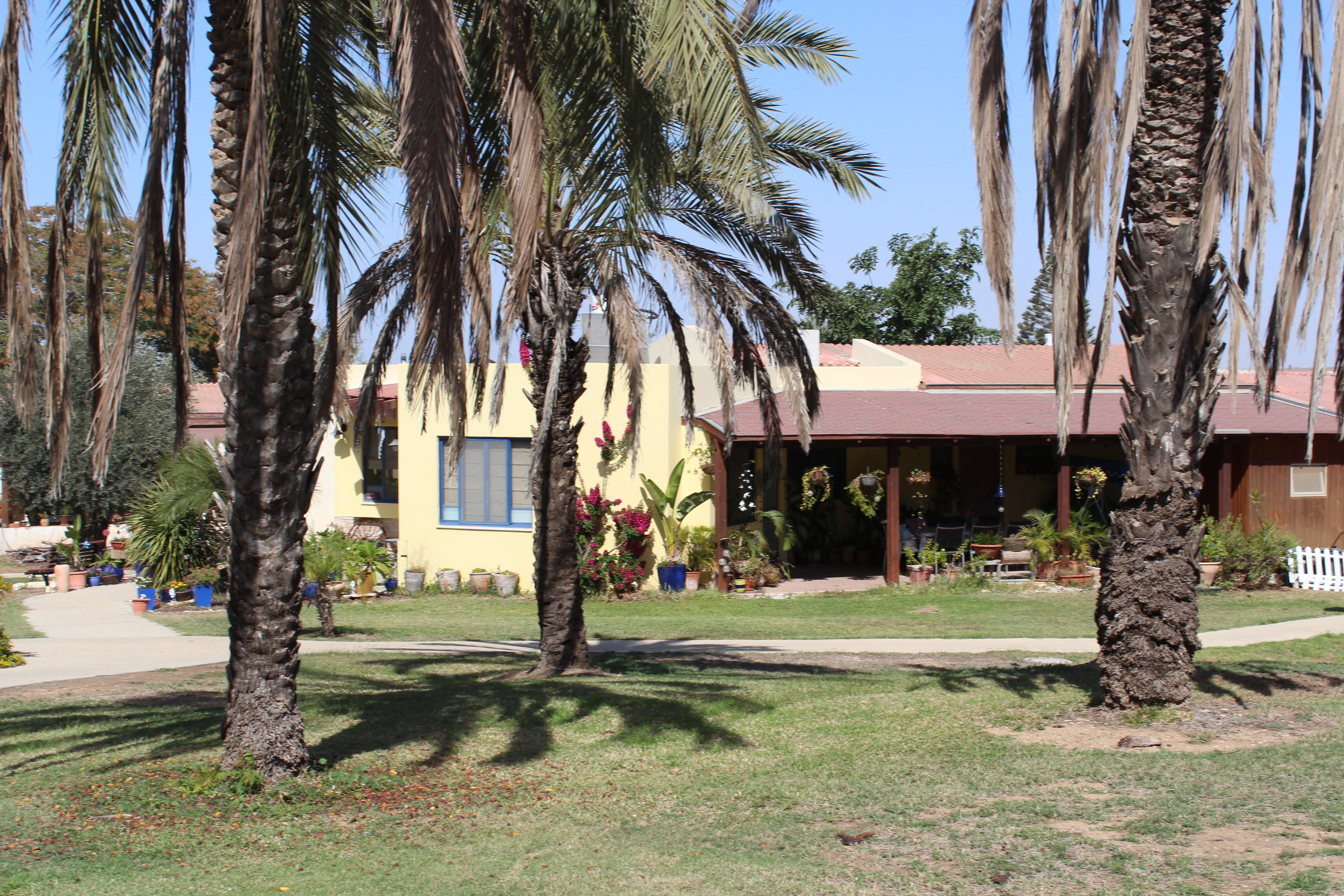
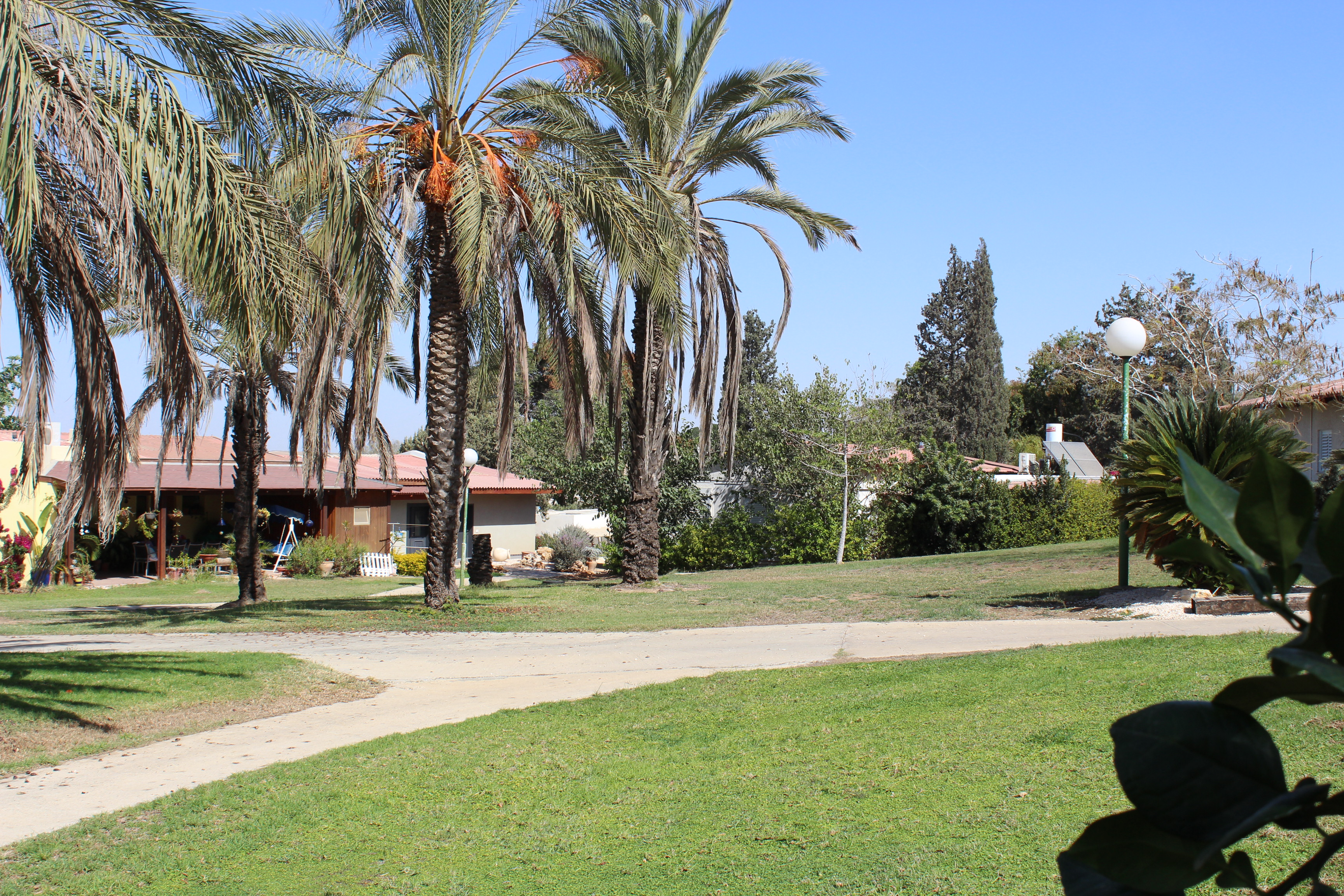
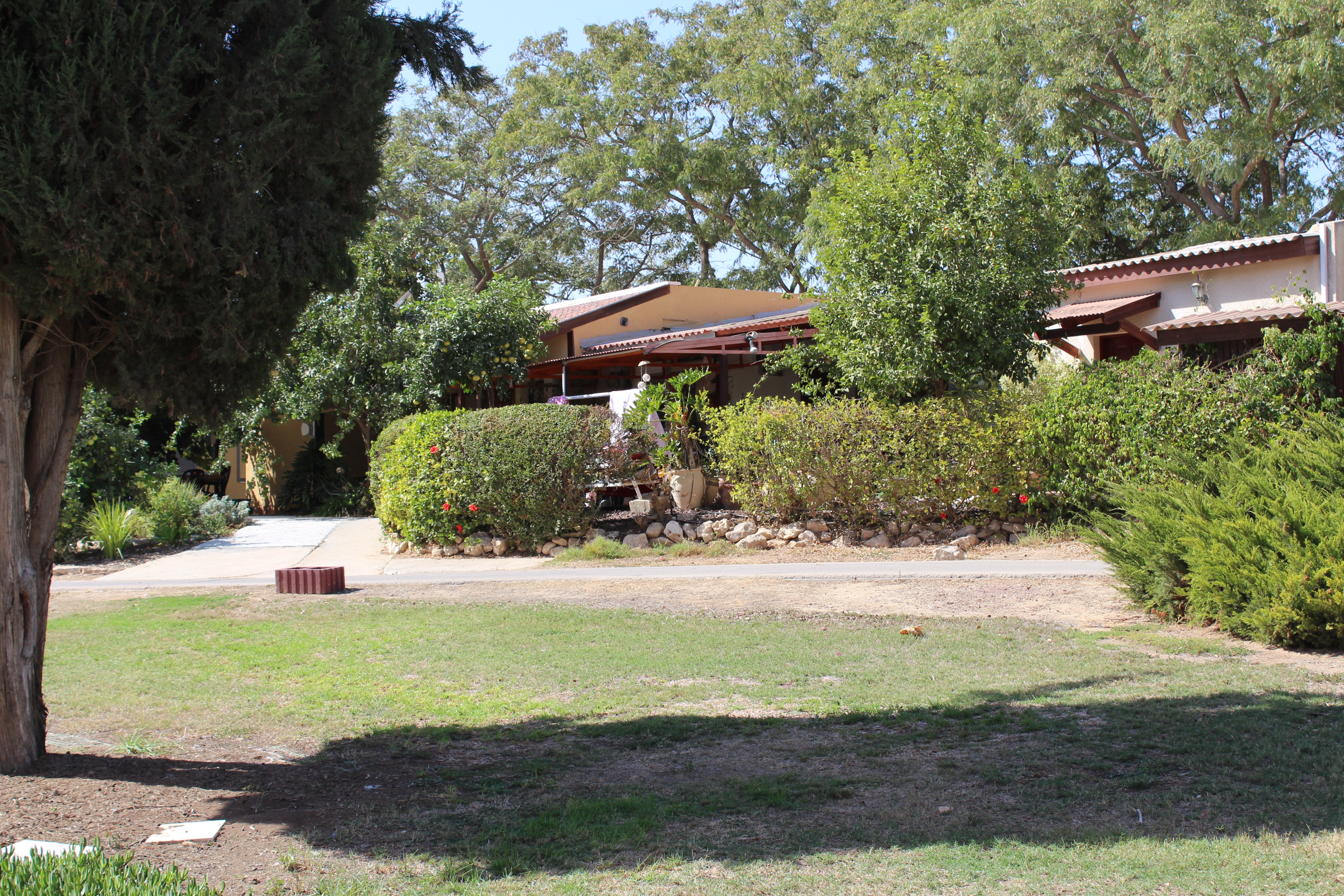
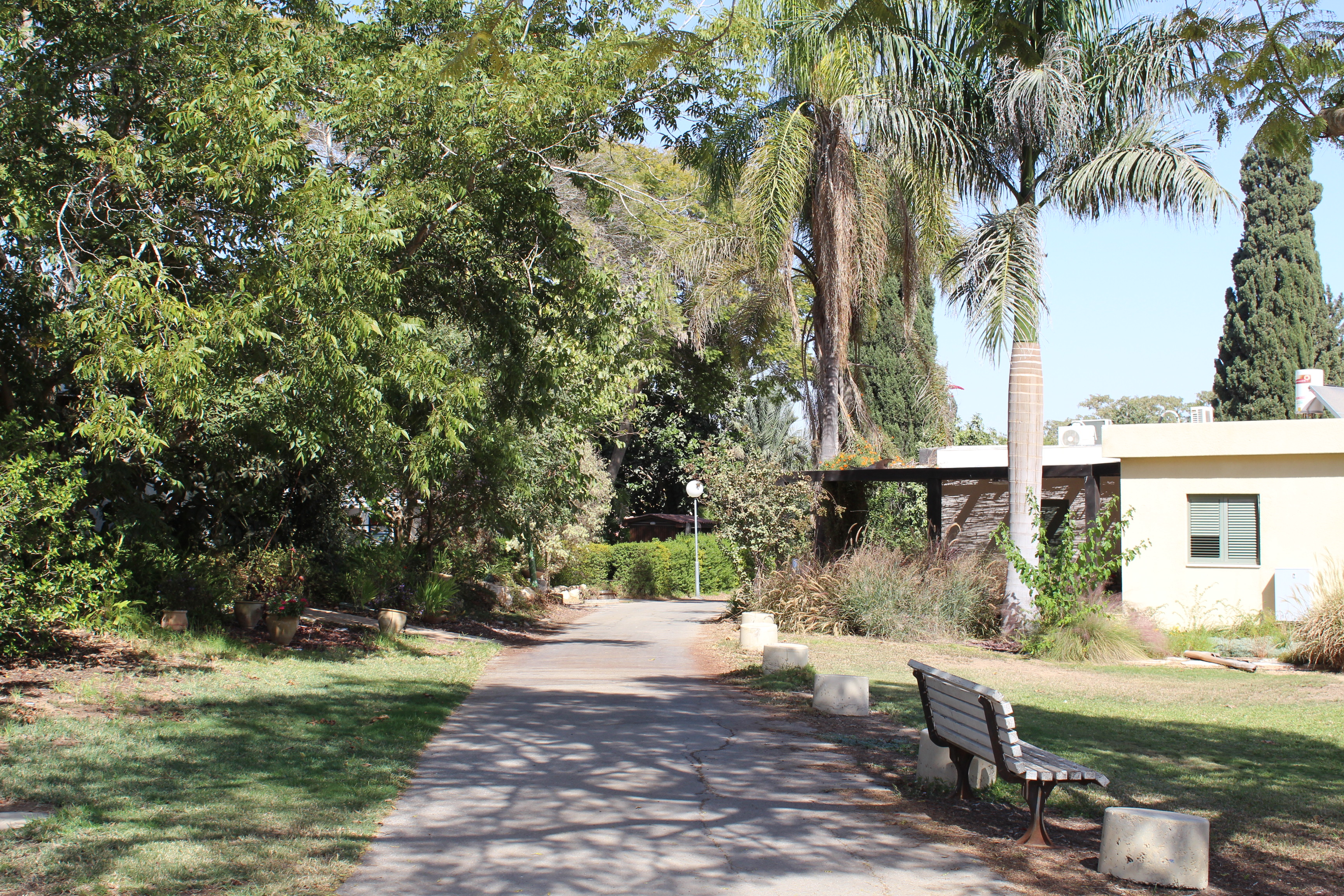
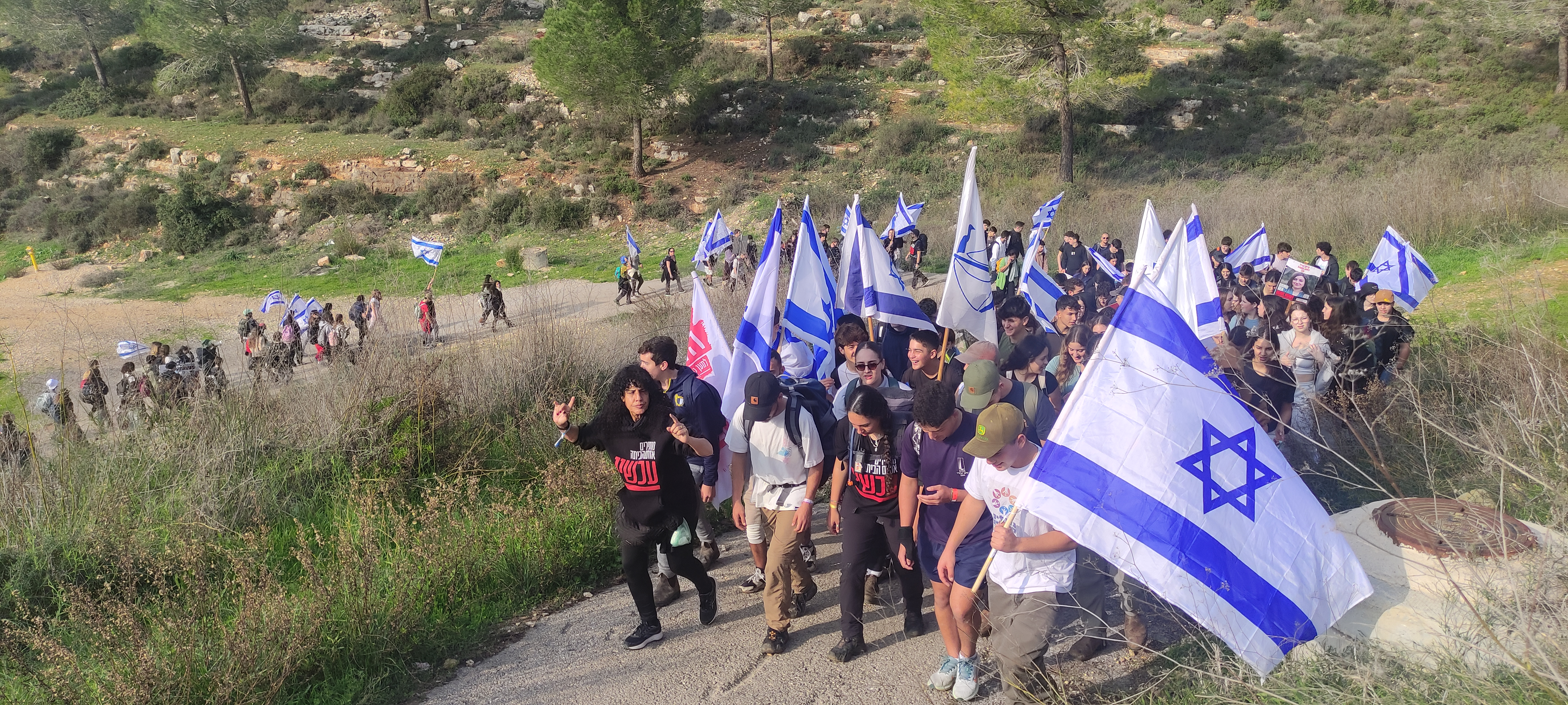

- Location within Ashkelon region of Israel Location within Israel
- Coordinates: 31°29′1″N 34°32′2″E
- Country: Israel
- District: Southern
- Subdistrict: Ashkelon
- Council: Sha'ar HaNegev
- Affiliation: Kibbutz Movement
- Founded: August 1951; reestablished 1956-57
- Founder: Egyptian and Moroccan Jews (1951); IDF veterans (1956-57)
- Population (2024): 964
- Website: www.kfar-aza.org.il

Kfar Aza (Hebrew: כְּפַר עַזָּה, lit. 'Gaza Village') is a kibbutz in southern Israel. Located between Netivot and Sderot around five kilometres (three miles) east of Gaza, it falls under the jurisdiction of Sha'ar HaNegev Regional Council. In 2024, it had a population of 964.

== History ==
The kibbutz was initially established in August 1951 by Jewish immigrants and refugees from Egypt and the Moroccan city of Tangier who had received training in Ein Harod, Ayelet HaShahar and later Afikim. It was temporarily abandoned in 1955, and in January 1957 members of the Mita'arim gar'in moved in, marking the reestablishment of the kibbutz.

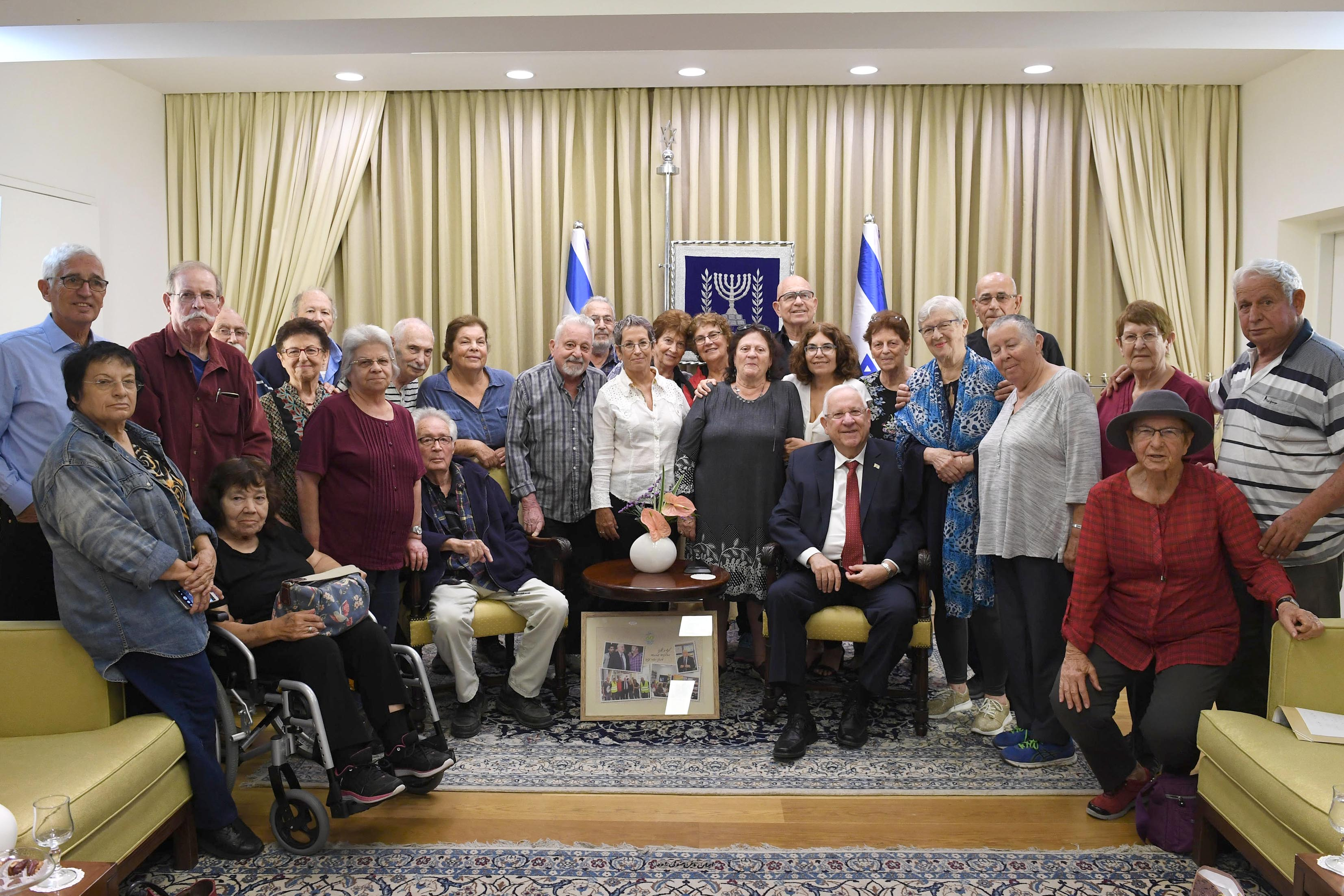
Israeli President Reuven Rivlin hosts veterans of the kibbutz on the 60th anniversary of its reestablishment, 2017

Before the 2023 massacre, the village had more than 700 residents, as well as a school and a synagogue.

=== October 7th massacre ===
As part of a broad surprise attack on more than 20 towns and villages in southern Israel on 7 October 2023, approximately 70 Hamas militants infiltrated Kfar Aza, massacred residents, and left the village in ruins. Another Palestinian militant group, the Democratic Front for the Liberation of Palestine, also declared that its troops (organized as National Resistance Brigades) were fighting the IDF in Kfar Aza. The militants attacked the village from four directions. They destroyed the gate in the town's perimeter fence and indiscriminately killed residents, torched cars and homes, and forced entry to homes using rocket-propelled grenades. More than a hundred civilians were murdered, while others were kidnapped and held hostage.

The Israel Defense Forces retook control of the village by 11 October 2023. The corpses of about 20 Hamas attackers were found in the town, along with paragliders used by Hamas and unexploded hand grenades.

== Economy ==
Kafrit Industries, a plastics manufacturer located in Kfar Aza, is traded on the Tel Aviv Stock Exchange. Kfar Aza was a pioneer in automated watering systems on farms.
