= Southern Sharon Natural Region =

Coordinates: 32°10′40″N 34°54′32″E

- Natural Region
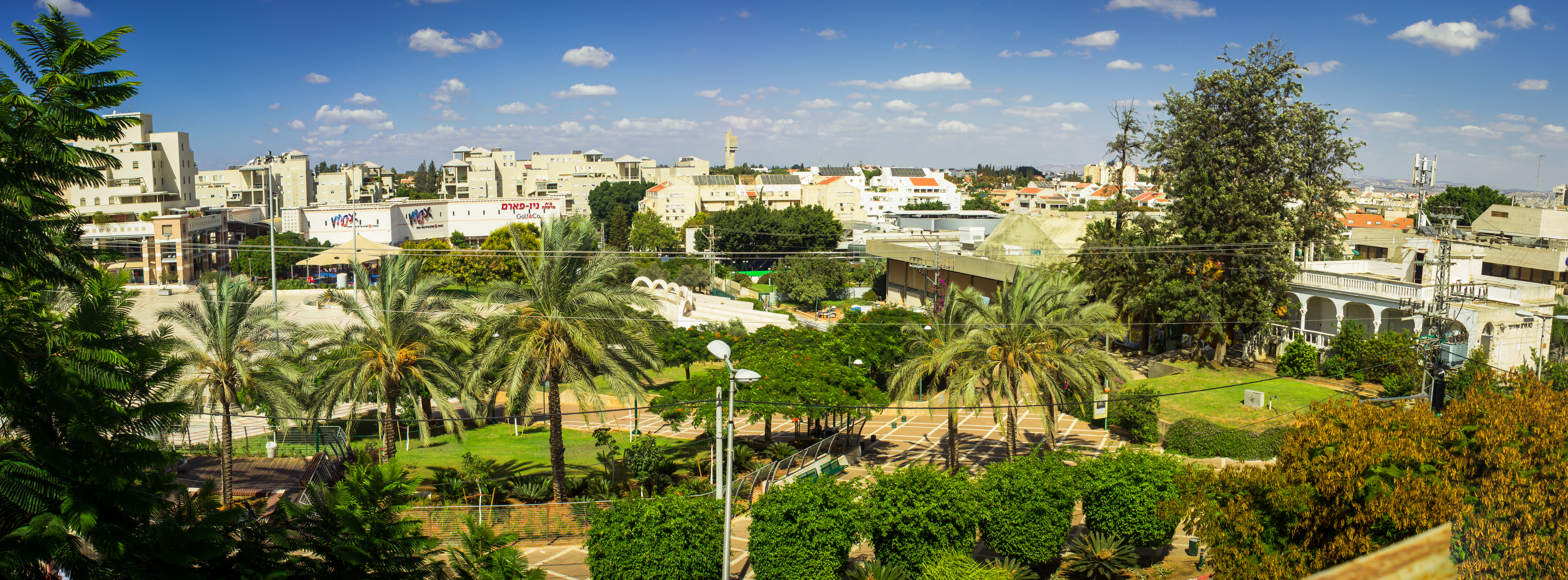
- View of Kfar Saba, the largest city in the Southern Sharon Natural Region
- Country: Israel
- District: Central
- Subdistrict: Petah Tikva
- Largest City: Kfar Saba

Area
  - Total: 124 km^{2} (48 sq mi)

Population (2024)
  - Total: 298,061

Ethnicity
  - Jews and others: 94.1%
  - Arabs: 3.8%

The Southern Sharon Natural Region is a natural region in the Petah Tikva Subdistrict, in the Central District of Israel. Kfar Saba is the largest city in the natural region.

== Geography ==
Districts, Subdistricts and Natural Regions of the State of Israel, 2018

The natural region consists mostly of a suburban area of the Sharon plain northeast of Tel Aviv, as well as several small towns close to the Green Line such as Jaljulia, Kokhav Ya'ir-Tzur Yig'al, and Tzur Yitzhak. It is roughly bordered by the city of Tira on the north, and the Yarkon River and Highway 5 to the south. It has an area of 124 km^{2}. The largest city in the natural region is Kfar Saba, which contains approximately one-third of the natural region's population. Other major towns in the natural region include Ra'anana, Hod HaSharon, and Jaljulia. The natural region is contained entirely within the Drom HaSharon regional council.

== Demographics ==
The vast majority of the residents of the Southern Sharon Natural Region are Jewish. 4 percent of the residents are Arab, more than 90 percent of whom live in Jaljulia.

Historical population
Year	Pop.	±%
1972	65,100	—
1983	113,600	+74.5%
1995	173,100	+52.4%
2008	233,880	+35.1%
2022	293,783	+25.6%
2024	298,061	+1.5%

== Administrative local authorities ==
Cities	Local Councils	Villages
Hod HaSharon; Kfar Saba; Ra'anana	Jaljulia; Kokhav Ya'ir-Tzur Yig'al	Drom HaSharon: Adanim; Beit Berl; Elishama; Eyal; Gan Haim; Ganei Am; Givat Hen; Hagor; Horshim; Kfar Malal; Matan; Neve Yamin; Neve Yarak; Nir Eliyahu; Nirit; Ramat HaKovesh; Ramot HaShavim; Sde Hemed; Sde Warburg; Tzofit; Tzur Natan; Tzur Yitzhak; Yarhiv; Yarkona

== Voting Patterns ==
In the 2022 election, 63 percent of voters in the natural region voted for the parties of the center-left coalition led by Yair Lapid, while 30 percent voted for the parties of the right-wing coalition led by Benjamin Netanyahu and 3 percent voted for the Arab parties.

In the 2026 election, 66 percent of voters in the natural region voted for the parties of the center-left coalition led by Gadi Eisenkot, while 26 percent voted for the parties of the right-wing coalition led by Benjamin Netanyahu and 4 percent voted for the Arab parties. An additional 3 percent voted for the Reservists, and 1.8 percent voted for Amcha Yisrael. Voter turnout increased 14 percent from the 2022 election.
