= Tzur Yitzhak =

Community settlement in central Israel

Tzur Yitzhak: צוּר יִצְחָק (Hebrew)
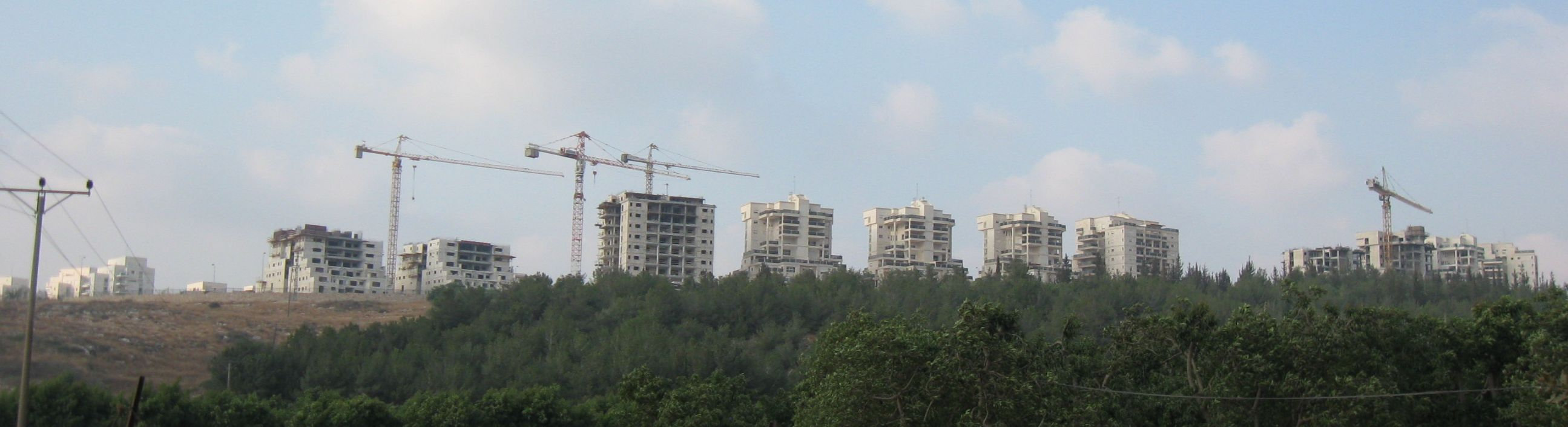

- Location within Central Israel
- Coordinates: 32°14′28″N 34°59′51″E
- Country: Israel
- District: Central
- Subdistrict: Petah Tikva
- Council: Drom HaSharon
- Founded: 2007
- Population (2024): 7,780

Tzur Yitzhak (Hebrew: צוּר יִצְחָק, lit. 'Rock of Yitzhak') is a community settlement in central Israel. Located near Tzur Natan and Kokhav Ya'ir, it falls under the jurisdiction of Drom HaSharon Regional Council. In 2024 it had a population of 7,780.

== History ==
The village was founded in June 2007 and named in memory of former Prime Minister Yitzhak Rabin. It initially consisted of around 140 residential units in two different projects. There were plans for a total of around 2,650 dwellings in the settlement, with its proximity to Highway 6 and attractive real estate prices assisting in its rapid growth.

On 8 September 2012 Tzur Yitzhak was officially recognized as an independent locality with a twelve-member council.

== Voting Patterns ==
In the 2022 election, 69 percent of voters in Tzur Yitzhak voted for the parties of the center-left coalition led by Yair Lapid, while 27 percent voted for the parties of the right-wing coalition led by Benjamin Netanyahu and 0.4 percent voted for the Arab parties.

In the 2026 election, 68 percent of voters in Tzur Yitzhak voted for the parties of the center-left coalition led by Gadi Eisenkot, while 24 percent voted for the parties of the right-wing coalition led by Benjamin Netanyahu and 1.3 percent voted for the Arab parties. An additional 4.4 percent voted for the Reservists, and 2.8 percent voted for Amcha Yisrael. Voter turnout increased 22 percent from the 2022 election.

== See also ==
- Roni Park
