= Use of cluster munitions during the 2026 Iran war =

The use of cluster munitions during the 2026 Iran war has been documented primarily in Iranian ballistic missile attacks on Israel after the war began on February 28, 2026. Human Rights Watch said that Iran repeatedly used cluster munitions in attacks on populated areas in Israel and verified three such attacks between March 4 and March 18, while its review of open-source material suggested that there were likely eight separate incidents between March 1 and March 20. At least four civilians were reported killed in cluster-munition strikes documented by the group. Iran also accused the US and Israel of employing cluster munitions in their attacks in Iran during the war.

== Background ==
Cluster munitions are weapons delivered by aircraft, rockets, missiles or artillery that open in flight and scatter many smaller explosive submunitions over a broad area. Because a portion of the bomblets fail to explode on impact, they can threaten civilians long after the original strike.

The Convention on Cluster Munitions, which entered into force in 2010, prohibits the use, production, transfer and stockpiling of cluster munitions for its states parties. Neither Iran nor Israel is party to the convention, and the United States has also not acceded to it.

== Use by Iran ==
After the United States and Israel launched attacks on Iran on February 28, 2026, Iranian retaliatory missile strikes on Israel included cluster-munition warheads.

On March 4, the first confirmed incident occurred in Or Yehuda, when a submunition struck a commercial area. A second confirmed attack on March 9 affected Yehud, Or Yehuda, Bat Yam and Holon; according to Human Rights Watch, the apparent submunitions likely came from a single ballistic missile and landed across sites up to 13 kilometres (8.1 mi) apart. Two construction workers were killed in Yehud and at least one other person was seriously injured in Or Yehuda.

On March 18, a third cluster-munition attack in the Tel Aviv metropolitan area, including impacts in Ramat Gan, Petah Tikva and Bnei Brak. In Ramat Gan, a man and woman in their 70s were killed when a submunition struck their apartment building. In another barrage of Iranian cluster bomb attacks, a foreign worker from Thailand at Moshav Adanim was killed by shrapnel from a missile while a group of three women at a beauty salon in the West Bank village of Beit Awwa, near Hebron, were killed when they were struck by debris from a cluster munition.

An Iranian missile attack on March 28 killed a civilian at a residential building Tel Aviv who was guarding an area in which there had been a fatal missile attack earlier in the war and was struck by a cluster munition while in an unprotected area.

== Reception ==
Human Rights Watch said Iran's repeated use of cluster munitions in populated parts of Israel violated the laws of war and may amount to war crimes. Amnesty International likewise described cluster munitions as inherently indiscriminate and said their use in attacks on civilian areas violated international humanitarian law.

== See also ==
- Cluster munition
- Convention on Cluster Munitions
- 2026 Iran war
