= Hagor =

Moshav in central Israel

Hagor: חָגוֹר (Hebrew)
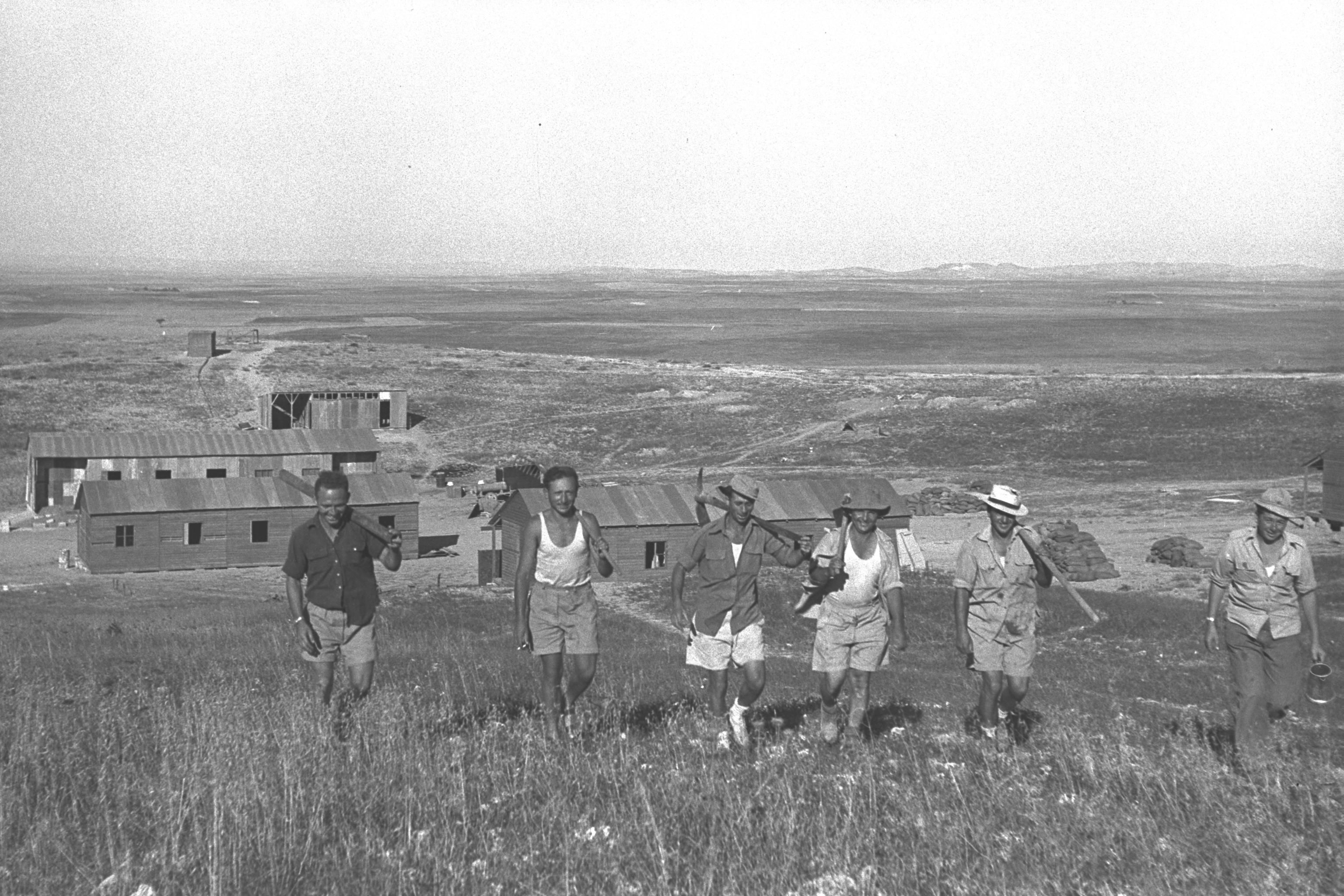

- Location within Central Israel Location within Israel
- Coordinates: 32°8′20″N 34°56′55″E
- Country: Israel
- District: Central
- Subdistrict: Petah Tikva
- Council: Drom HaSharon
- Affiliation: Moshavim Movement
- Founded: 1949
- Founder: Palmach veterans
- Population (2024): 1,145
- Website: www.hagor.org.il

Hagor (Hebrew: חָגוֹר) is a moshav in the Central District of Israel. Located between Rosh HaAyin and Kfar Saba it falls under the jurisdiction of Drom HaSharon Regional Council. In 2024 it had a population of 1,145.

== History ==
Moshav Hagor was founded in 1949 by veterans of the Palmach's Ninth Battalion. It became a cooperative agricultural settlement populated by new immigrants, mostly from Middle Eastern and North African countries. The name comes from a verse in the Book of Psalms, "Gird (in Hebrew, hagor) thy sword upon thy thigh, O mighty one, Thy glory and thy majesty" (Psalms 45:3).

The children of Hagor attend the elementary school at Tzofit, a nearby moshav. Their middle school is located near moshav Neve Yerek, and the secondary school is in Beit Berl.

== Notable residents ==
- Gabi Ashkenazi, former Chief of Staff of the Israel Defense Forces
- Dan Halutz, former Chief of Staff of the Israel Defense Forces
