= Shahar Kober =

Israeli illustrator, art director and lecturer

Shahar Kober (Hebrew: שחר קובר; born 1979) is an Israeli-German illustrator, art director and lecturer. He lives in Kiryat Tivon, Israel.

== Biography ==
Kober was born in Kfar-Saba and raised in Ganei Am. He attended the Ami Assaf high school in Beit Berl and the University of Chicago Laboratory School. At age 21, he was admitted to Shenkar College of Engineering and Design, studying illustration and graphic design, graduating in 2005. He later on completed his Master's Degree in culture and film studies, from the University of Haifa.

Kober has illustrated tens of children's books, published in Israel, The United Kingdom, United States, and other countries. His work is regularly published in newspapers and magazines, and he also contributes art to animation projects. His work on "The Ugly Dumpling" was reviewed favorably by Publishers Weekly and Kirkus Reviews, and so was "Chicken in Space". His book "The Flying Hand of Marco B." was selected one of the best children's books of 2015 by the Smithsonian Air & Space Magazine. Among others, he illustrated books by former Children's Laureate Michael Morpurgo, Israeli poet Leah Goldberg, Israel's national poet Hayim Nahman Bialik, and award-winning children's author Adam Lehrhaupt.

His illustrations were displayed in exhibitions in Israel, China and South Korea.

Since 2013, Kober teaches Illustration in the WIZO Haifa Academy of Design and Education, in Haifa, Israel.

== Awards ==
2021 - The Unpublished Picturebook Showcase 3

2020 - 3x3 Magazine Book Show Merit Award

2015 - Communication Arts Illustration Award of Excellence

2015 - 3x3 Magazine Book Show Merit Award

2014 - 3x3 Magazine Book Show Merit Award

2013 - Creative Quarterly 32 Professional Illustration runner-up

2011 - Sydney Taylor Notable Book for Younger Readers

2009 - Sydney Taylor Honor Award

== Partial bibliography ==
- Aladdin by Anna Bowles, Little Tiger Press, UK, 2019 ISBN 978-1680101355
- Chicken On Vacation by Adam Lehrhaupt, HarperCollins, USA, 2018 ISBN 978-0062364180
- Grandpa's Back by Nevo Ziv, Yedioth Aharonoth Books, Israel, 2017
- The Jungle Book by Rudyard Kipling, Usborne Publishing, UK, 2017 ISBN 978-1474925495
- Chicken in School by Adam Lehrhaupt, HarperCollins, USA, 2017 ISBN 978-0062364135
- Chicken in Space by Adam Lehrhaupt, HarperCollins, USA, 2016 ISBN 978-0-06-236412-8
- The Ugly Dumpling by Stephanie Campisi, Mighty Media Kids, USA, 2016 ISBN 978-1-938063-67-1
- The Flying Hand of Marco B. by Richard Leiter, Sleeping Bear Press, USA, 2015 ISBN 978-1585368884
- One Last Story by Eilam Ben-Dror, Matar Publishing House, Israel, 2015
- Noam's Shop of Words, by Ruvik Rosenthal. Keter Publishing House, Israel, 2014
- At the End of the Road by Iris Argaman, Matar Publishing House, Israel, 2014
- Snakes and Ladders, by Michael Morpurgo, Egmont Publishing, UK, 2012 ISBN 978-1405260817
- Engineer Ari and the Rosh Hashanah Ride by Deborah Bodin Cohen, Kar-Ben Publishing, USA, 2008 ISBN 978-0822586487
