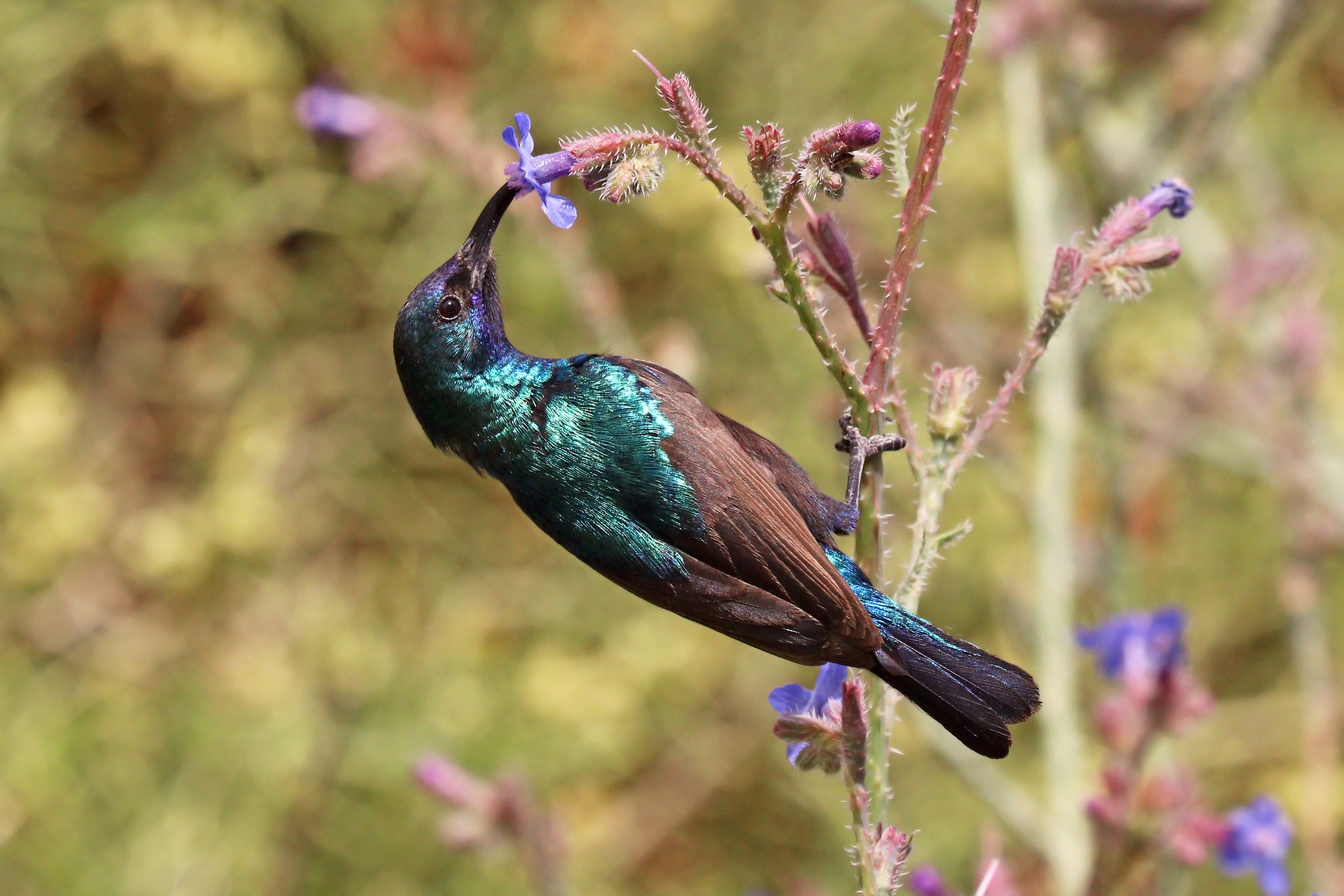
- Male
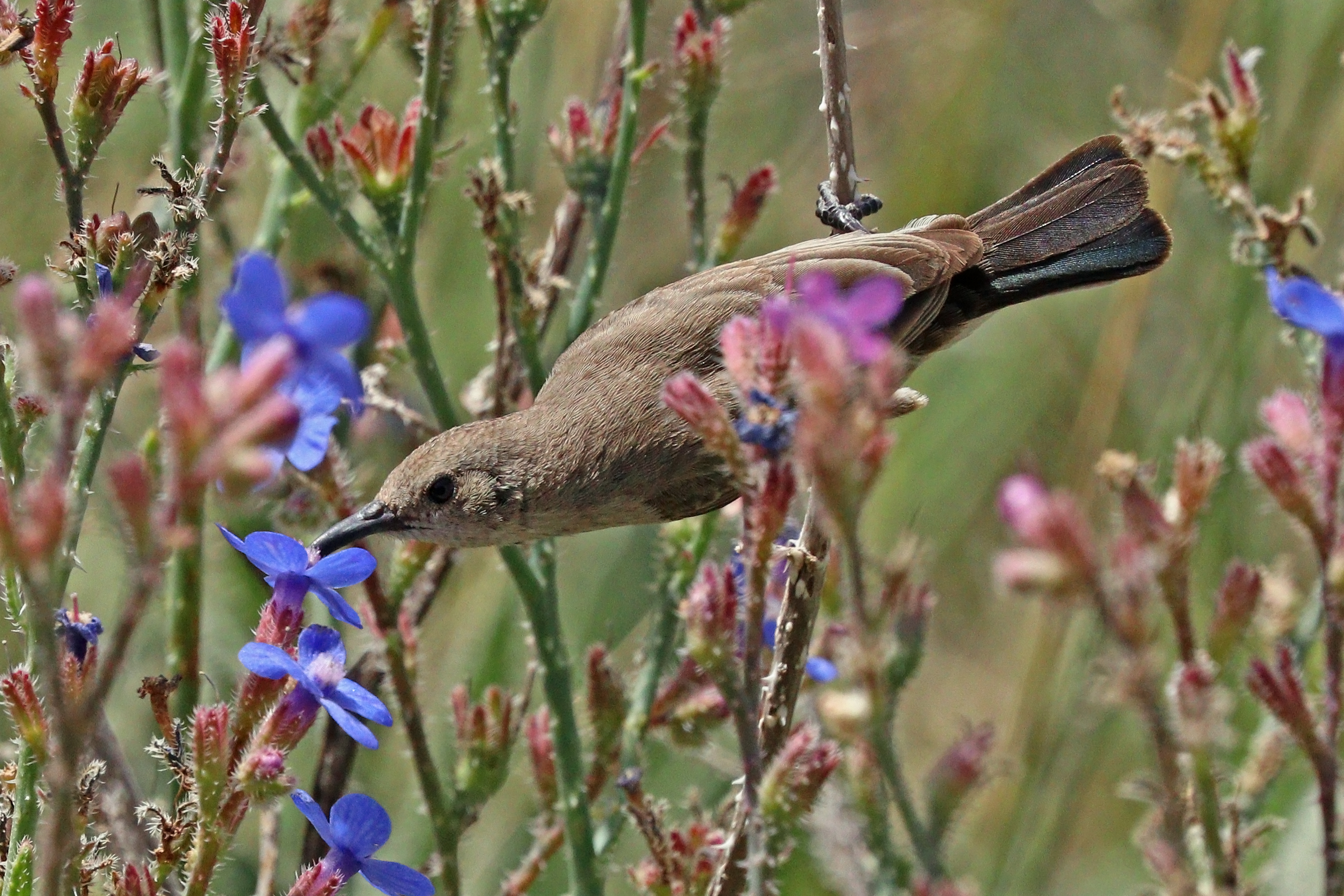
- Female, both C. o. osea Dana Biosphere Reserve, Jordan

Conservation status
- Least Concern (IUCN 3.1)

Scientific classification
- Kingdom: Animalia
- Phylum: Chordata
- Class: Aves
- Order: Passeriformes
- Family: Nectariniidae
- Genus: Cinnyris
- Species: C. osea

Binomial name
- Cinnyris osea Bonaparte, 1856

Synonyms
- Cinnyris oseus Nectarinia osea

= Palestine sunbird =

Species of passerine bird

The Palestine sunbird (Cinnyris osea) is a small passerine bird of the sunbird family, Nectariniidae. Found in parts of the Middle East and sub-Saharan Africa, it is also known as the northern orange-tufted sunbird. However, the name "orange-tufted sunbird" refers to another species, found further south in Africa. In 2015 the Palestinian Authority adopted the species as a national bird, after it lost in Israel's national bird public vote in 2008 in favor of the hoopoe. The specific name osea is derived from Ancient Greek ὁσια (hosia, "holy").

== Description ==
The Palestine sunbird is 8 to 12 cm long with a wingspan of 14 to 16 cm. Males have an average weight of 7.6 g and females weigh around 6.8 g. The bill is fairly long, black and curves downwards. The plumage of breeding males is mostly dark but appears glossy blue or green in the light. There are orange tufts at the sides of the breast which are hard to see except at close range. Females and juveniles are grey-brown above with pale underparts. Non-breeding males are similar but may retain some dark feathers.

It has a high, fast, jingling song and various calls including a harsh alarm call.

== Habitat and range ==
It occurs in areas with high temperatures and dry climate from sea level up to an altitude of 3200 m. It inhabits dry woodland, scrub, wadis, savannas, orchards and gardens. It is common in towns in some areas.

The Middle Eastern subspecies C. o. osea breeds from Israel, Palestine and Jordan in the north, down through western Saudi Arabia to Yemen and Oman in the south. The expansion of Israeli cities, towns and villages over the last century played a significant role in the spread of the Palestine sunbird throughout the region, with cultivated tropical plants becoming more common in urban gardening. In recent decades it has colonized the Sinai Peninsula in Egypt. It has been observed breeding in Lebanon and regularly winters in both Lebanon and Syria.

The African subspecies C. o. decorsei is found very locally in parts of Sudan, north-west Uganda, the Central African Republic, north-east Democratic Republic of Congo and northern Cameroon.

== Feeding ==
The diet consists mainly of insects and nectar. The tongue is long and brush-tipped to extract nectar from flowers.

== Reproduction ==
The purse-like nest hangs from a branch in a tree or bush. It is 18 cm long and 8 cm wide at the base. It is made of leaves, grass and other plant material which is bound together with hair and spider webs and lined with wool and feathers. One to three smooth, glossy eggs are laid. These are somewhat variable in colour; often white or grey with faint markings at the broader end. They are incubated for 13 to 14 days. The young are downy with an orange-red mouth and fledge after 14 to 21 days.

== Gallery ==
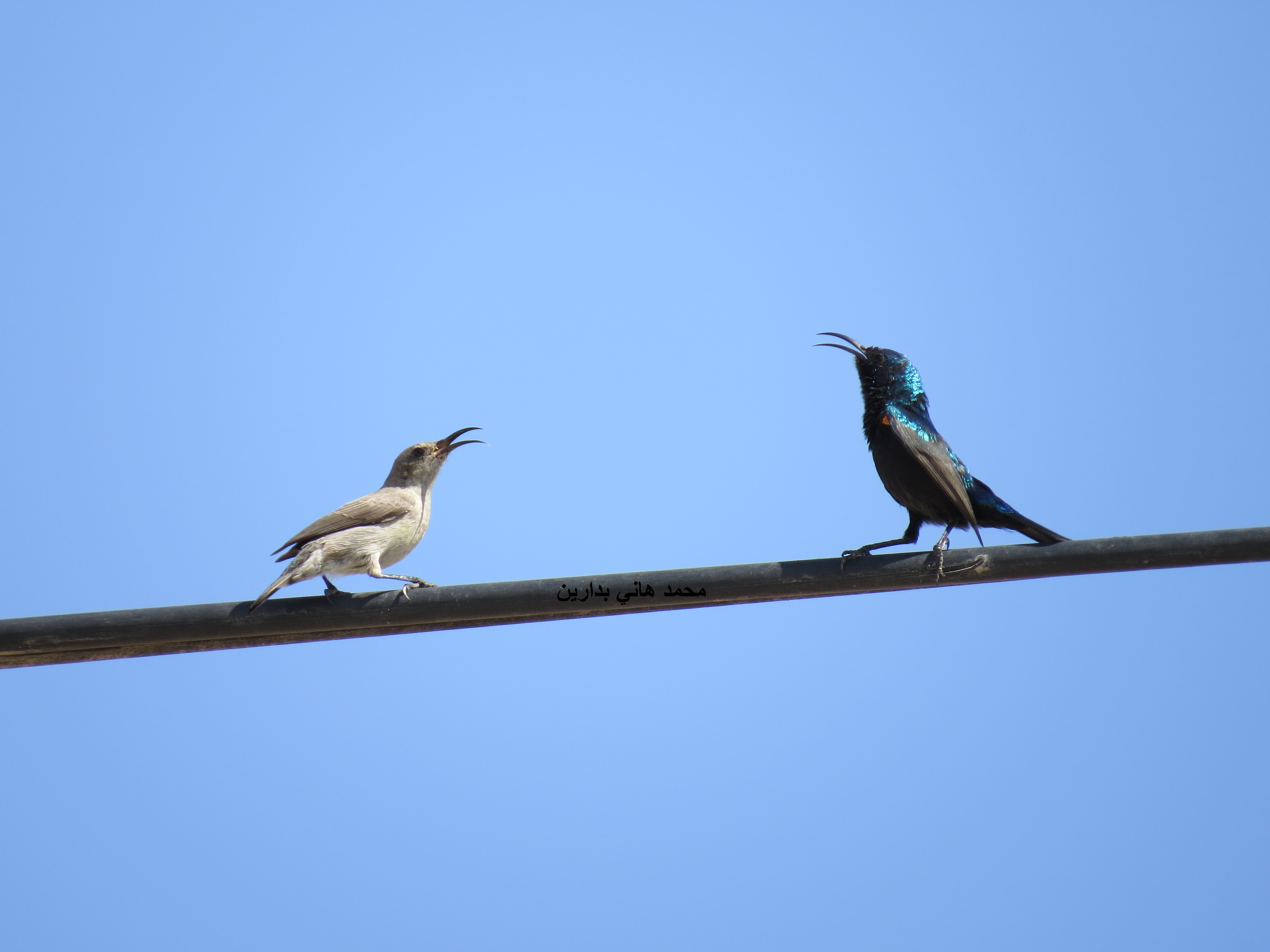
Pair in south Hebron, West Bank. The orange tufts at the sides of the breast can be seen on the male on the right.

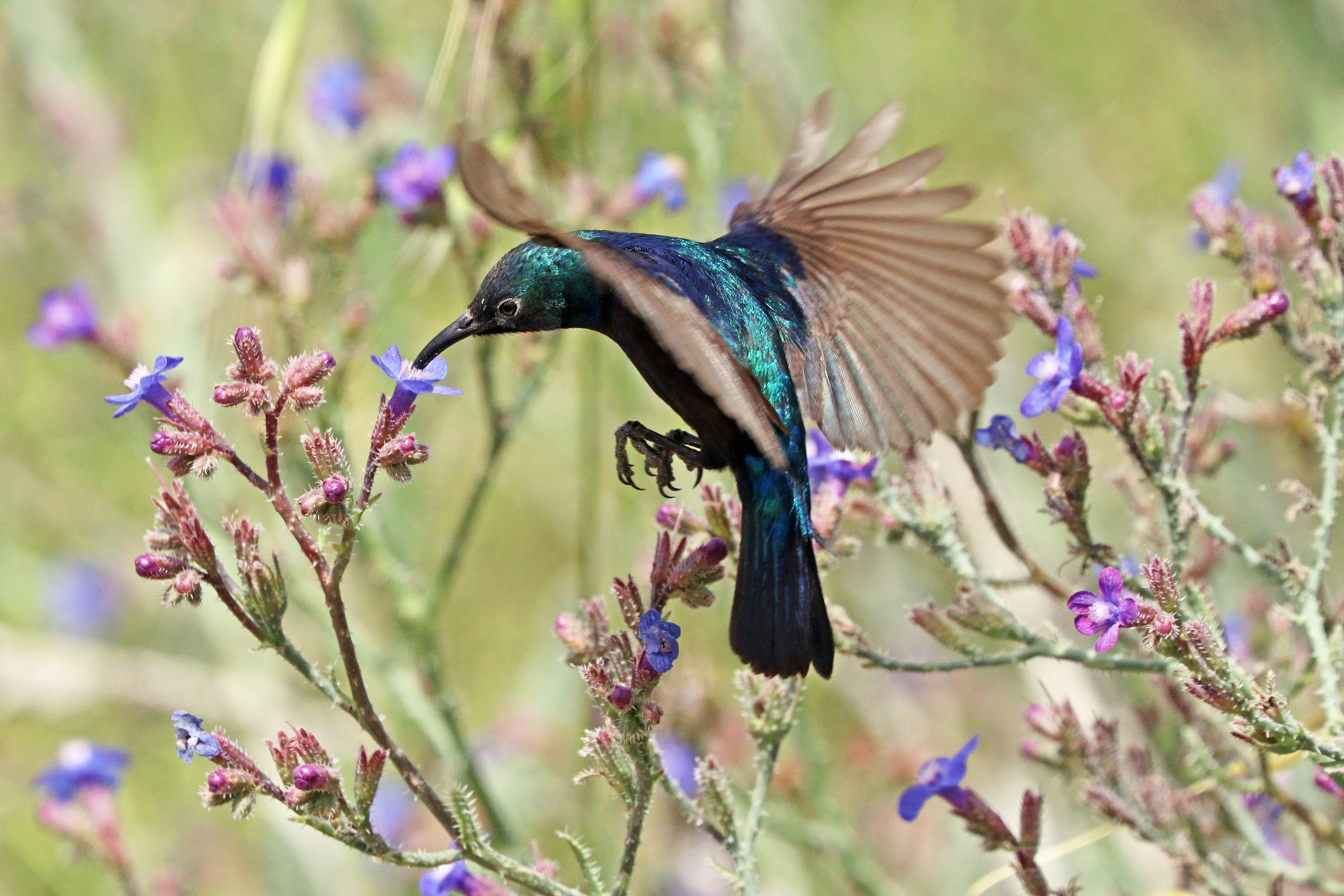
Male feeding while flying, Jordan

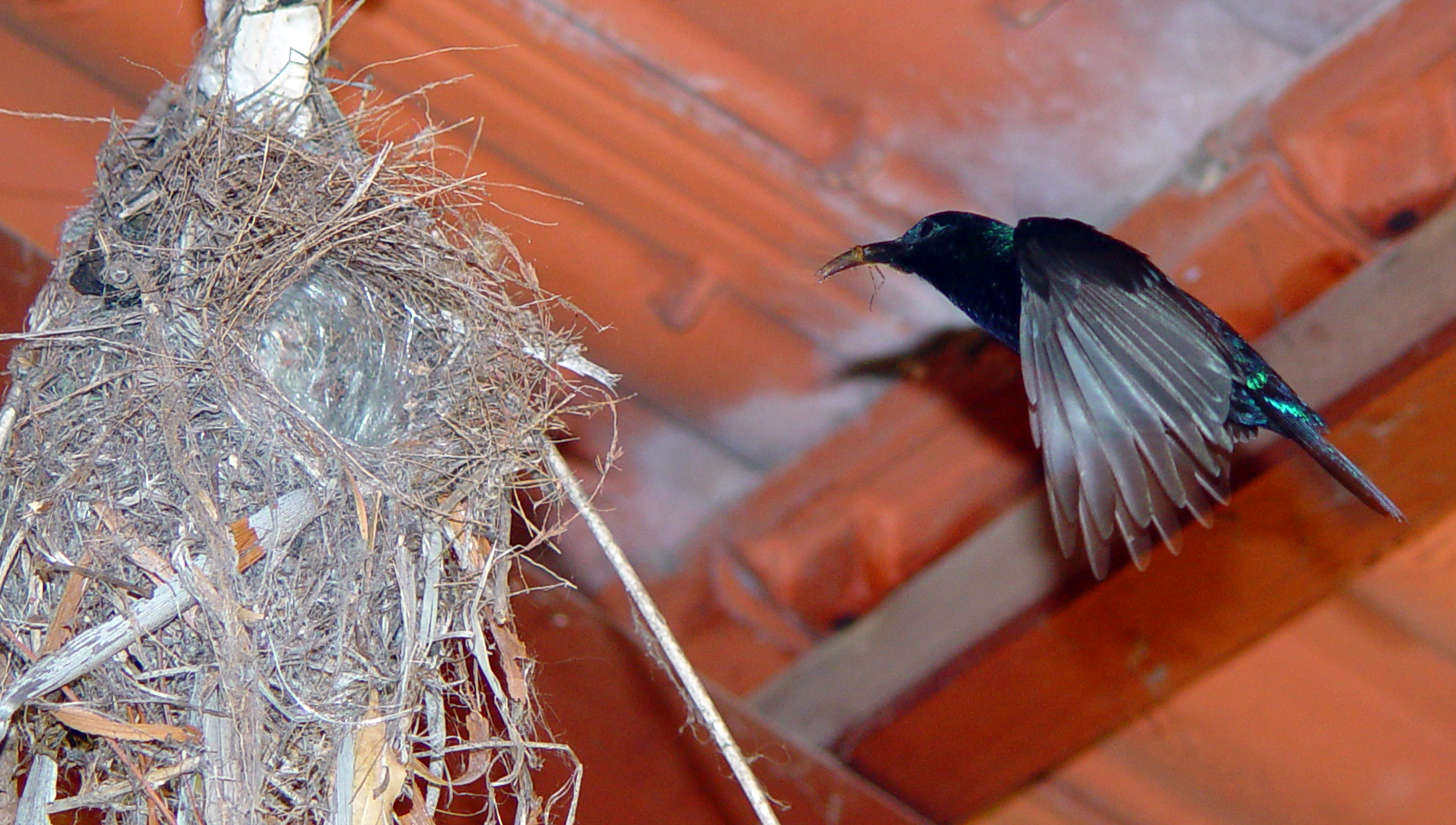
Male Palestine sunbird in Tzofit, Israel

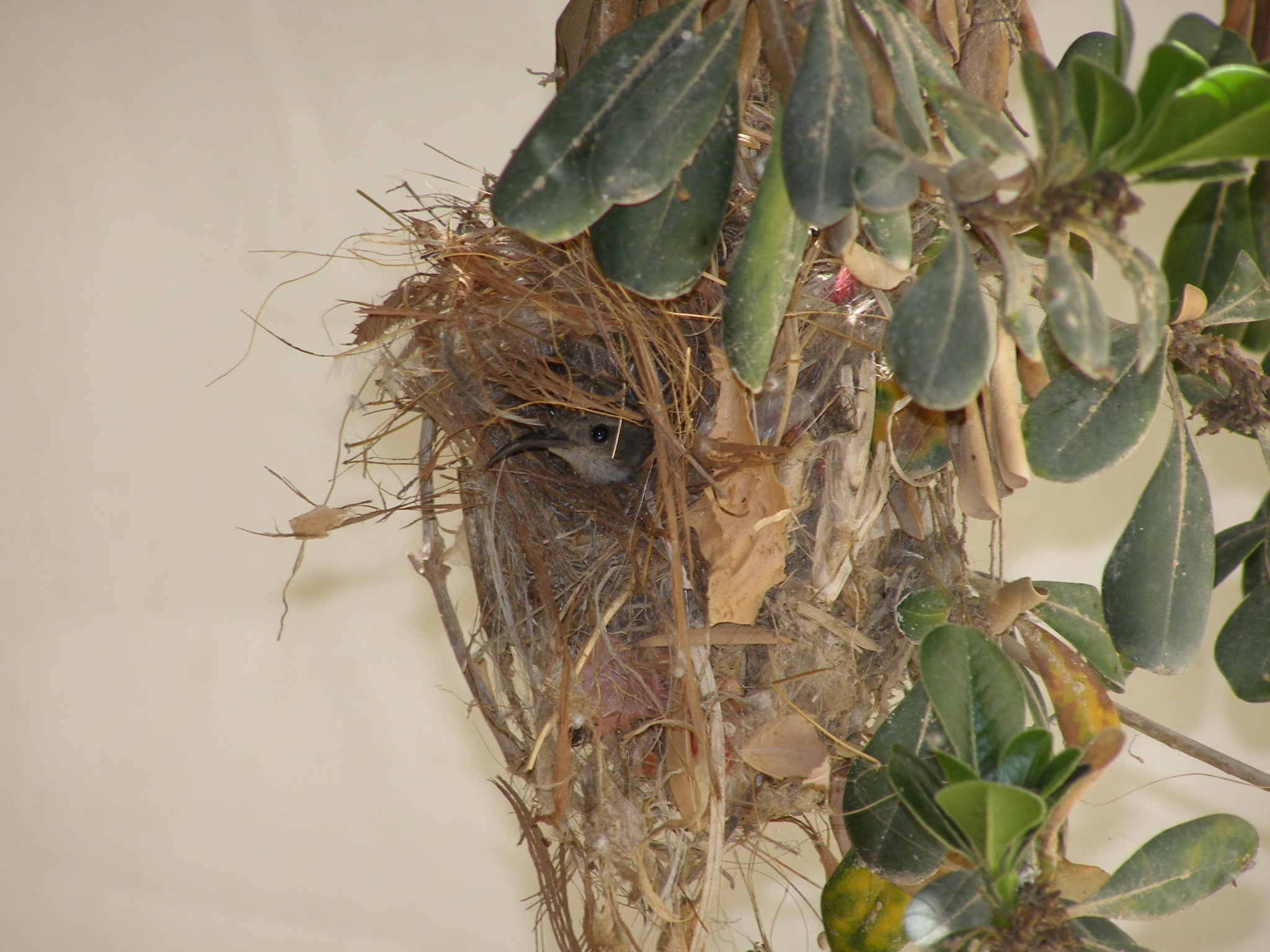
Female bird inside nest.

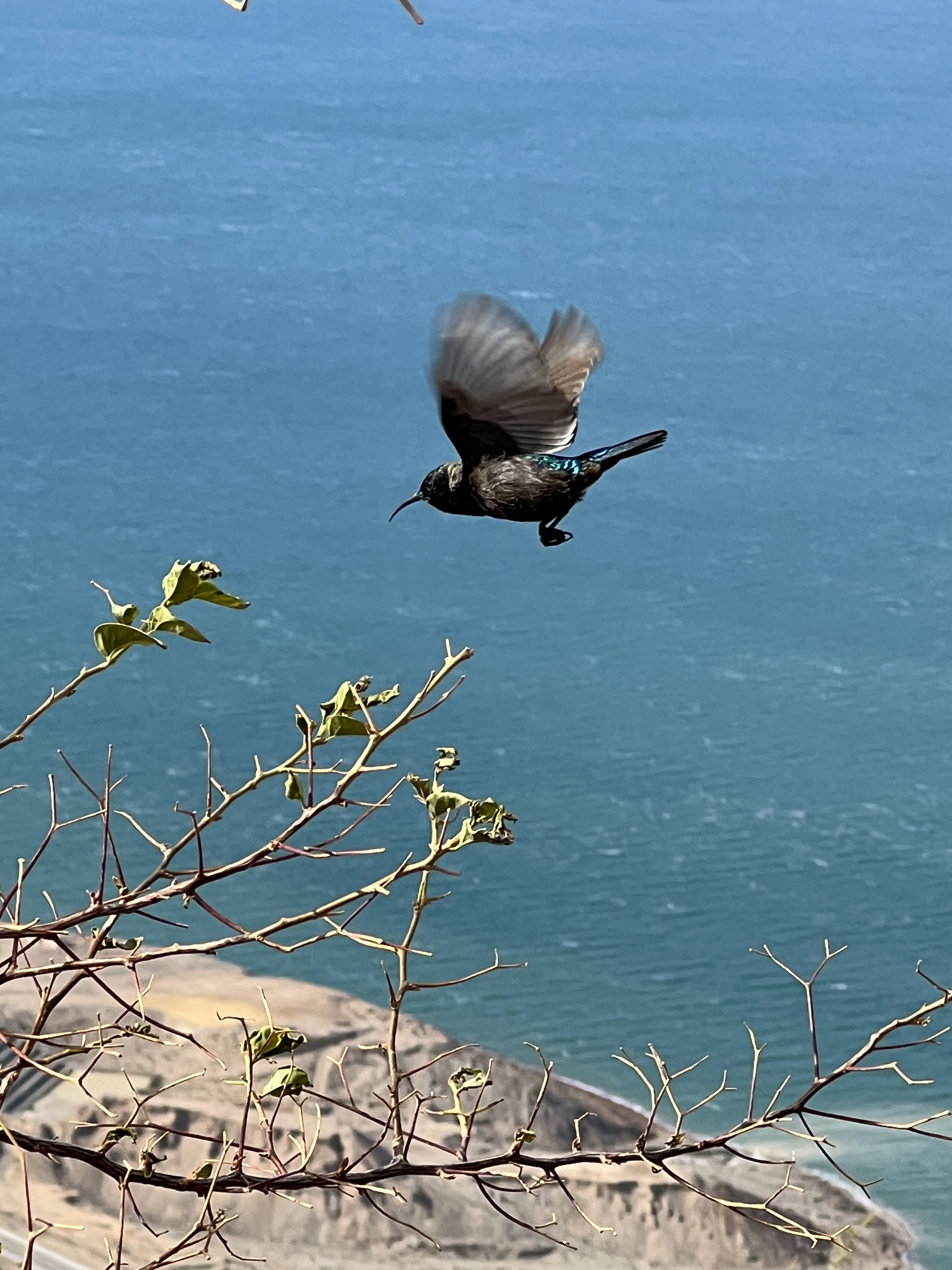
Male in flight over the Dead Sea

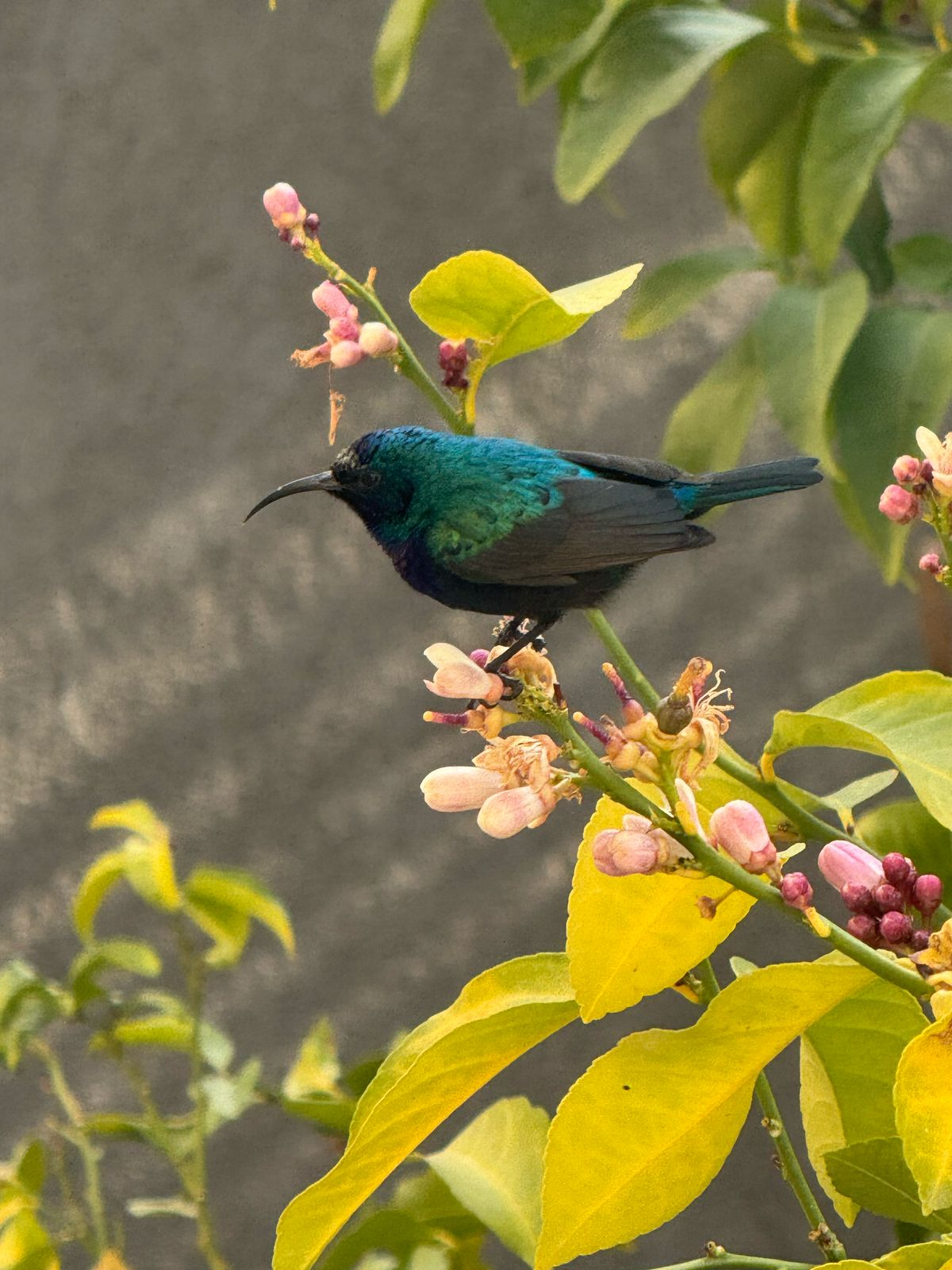
Palestine Sunbird caught at Dahyet al-Hussein suburbs in Amman, Jordan.
