= Kfar Sirkin =

Moshav in central Israel

Kfar Sirkin: כְּפַר סִירְקִין (Hebrew)
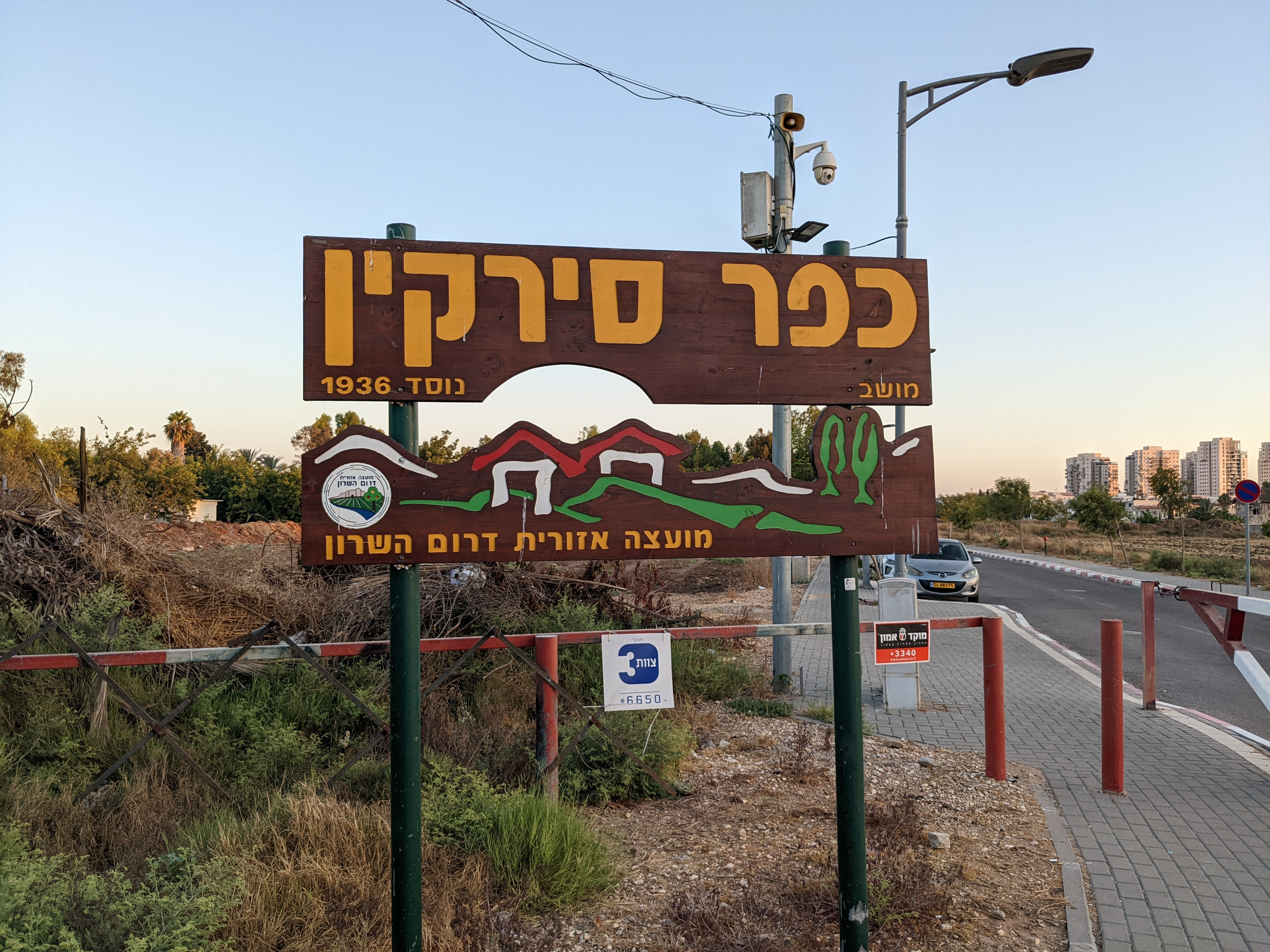

- Location within Central Israel
- Coordinates: 32°4′36″N 34°55′25″E
- Country: Israel
- District: Central
- Subdistrict: Petah Tikva
- Council: Southern Sharon
- Founded: 1936
- Population (2024): 1,439
- Website: http://www.kfarsirkin.org.il/

Kfar Sirkin or Kefar Syrkin (Hebrew: כְּפַר סִירְקִין, lit. Village Sirkin) is a moshav in central Israel. Located south-east of Petah Tikva, it falls under the jurisdiction of Drom HaSharon Regional Council. In 2024 it had a population of 1,439.

== History ==
Kfar Sirkin was founded in 1936 and was named for the Zionist leader Nachman Syrkin. It served as a Jewish stronghold during the 1936–1939 Arab revolt in Palestine, with the Haganah using the village to attack Palestinian forces and to store weapons which were illegal under the British Mandate rule of the time.

In the early 1940s the British set up a military camp (Camp Sirkin) and an airfield (RAF Sirkin) northwest of the village, which were then used by the IDF after their withdrawal in 1948. The IAF Flight Academy was first operated at Sirkin IAF Base until 1955, when it moved to Tel Nof Airbase.

Today, the village is agricultural and all IAF facilities were abandoned and demolished, but the former airbase is still visible from the air (2024).

== Gallery ==
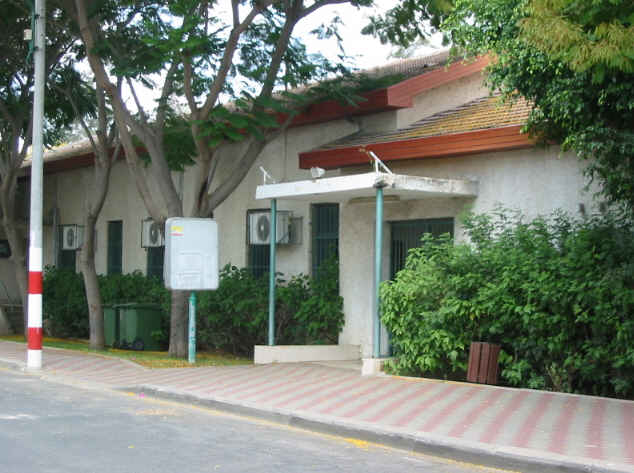
The local office in Kfar Sirkin

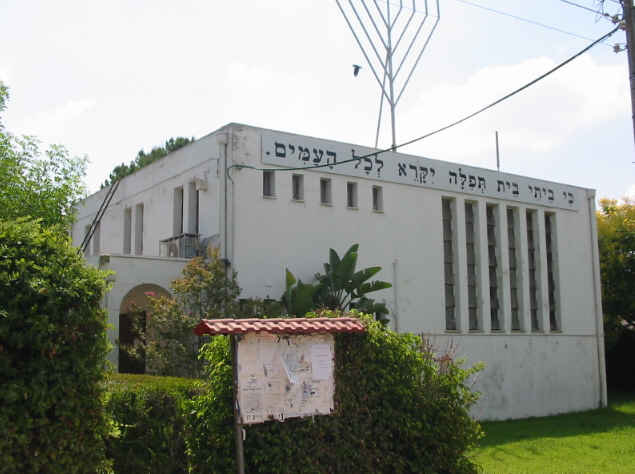
Local synagogue

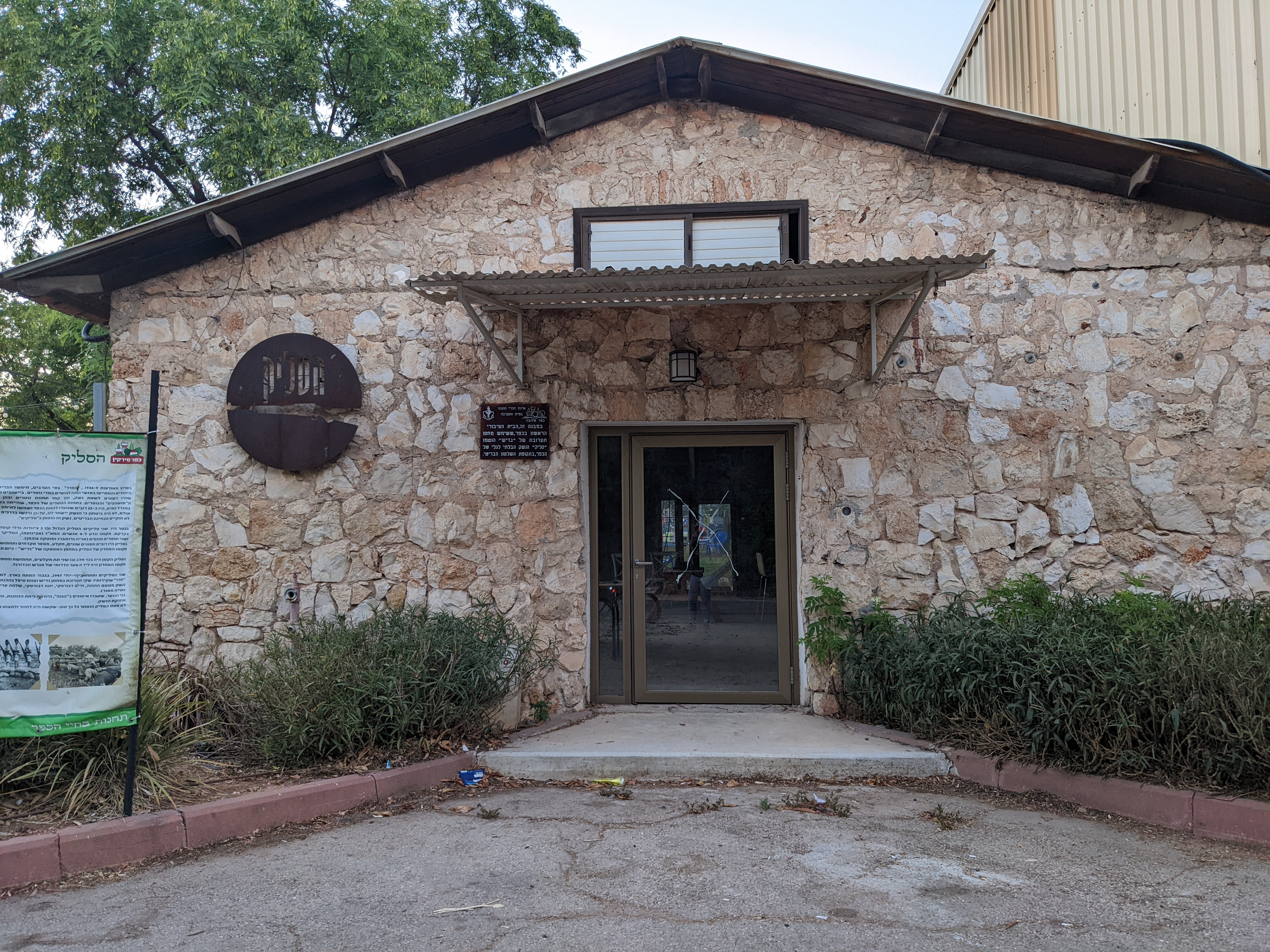
First public building in Kfar Sirkin

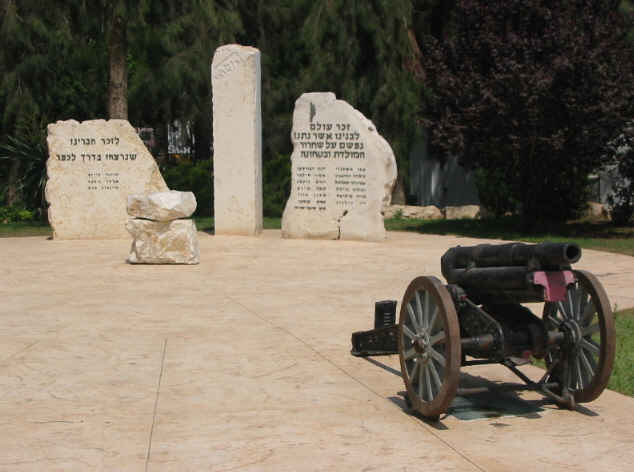
Memorial to residents who fell in the line of duty

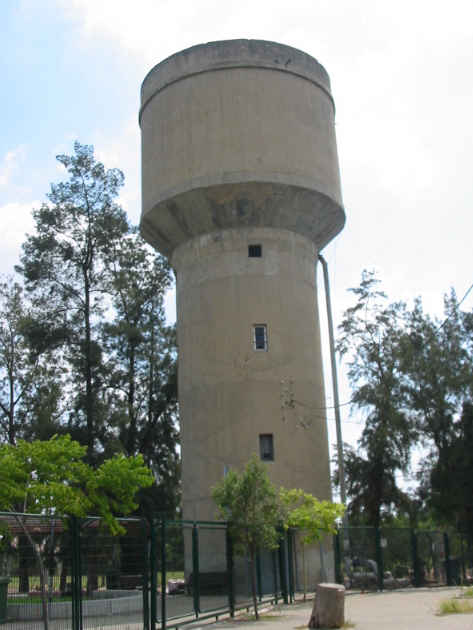
Water tower

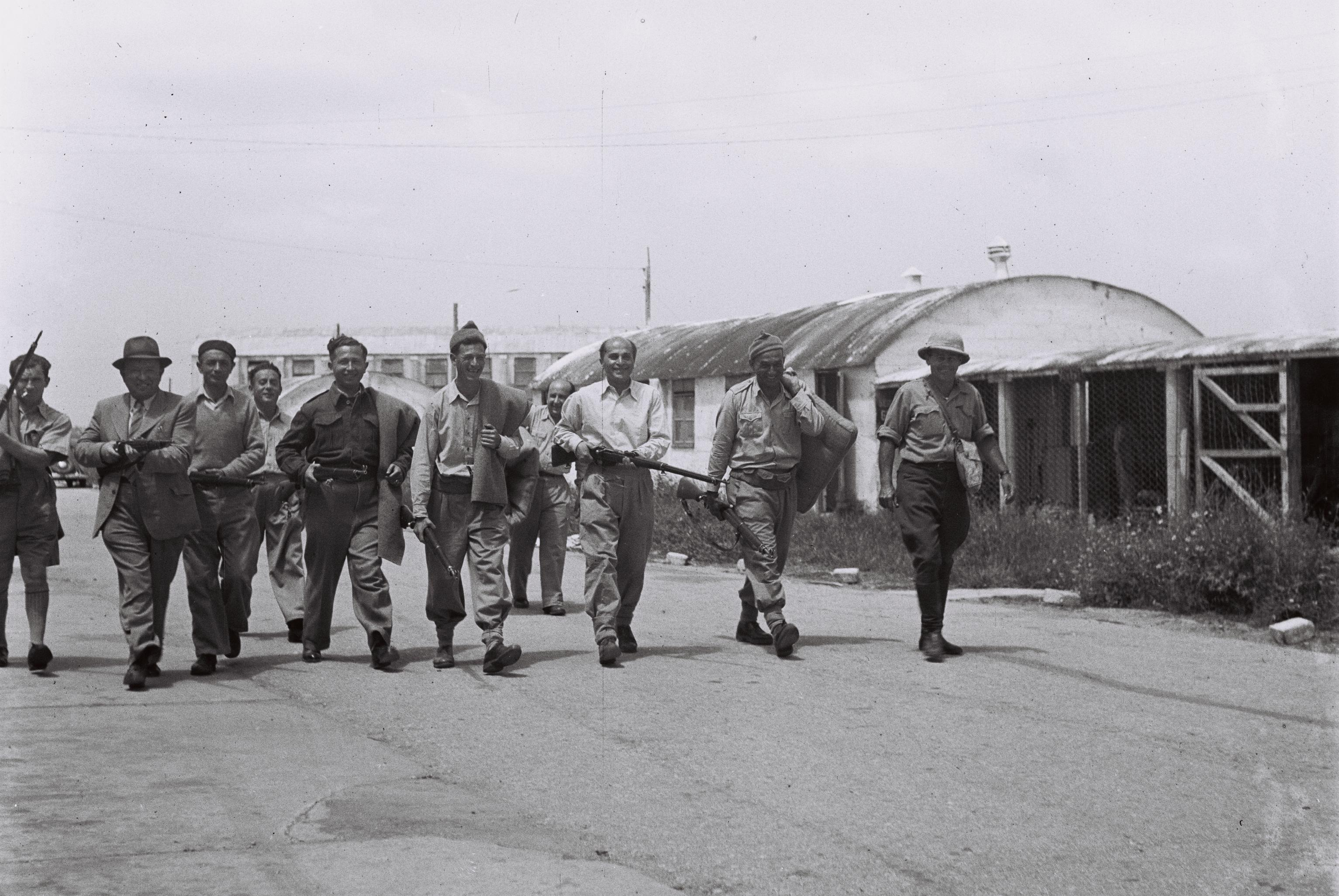
Haganah members guard Camp Sirkin and Airbase in June 1948
