= Elishama, Israel =

Moshav in central Israel

Elishama: אֱלִישָׁמָע (Hebrew); إليشماع (Arabic)
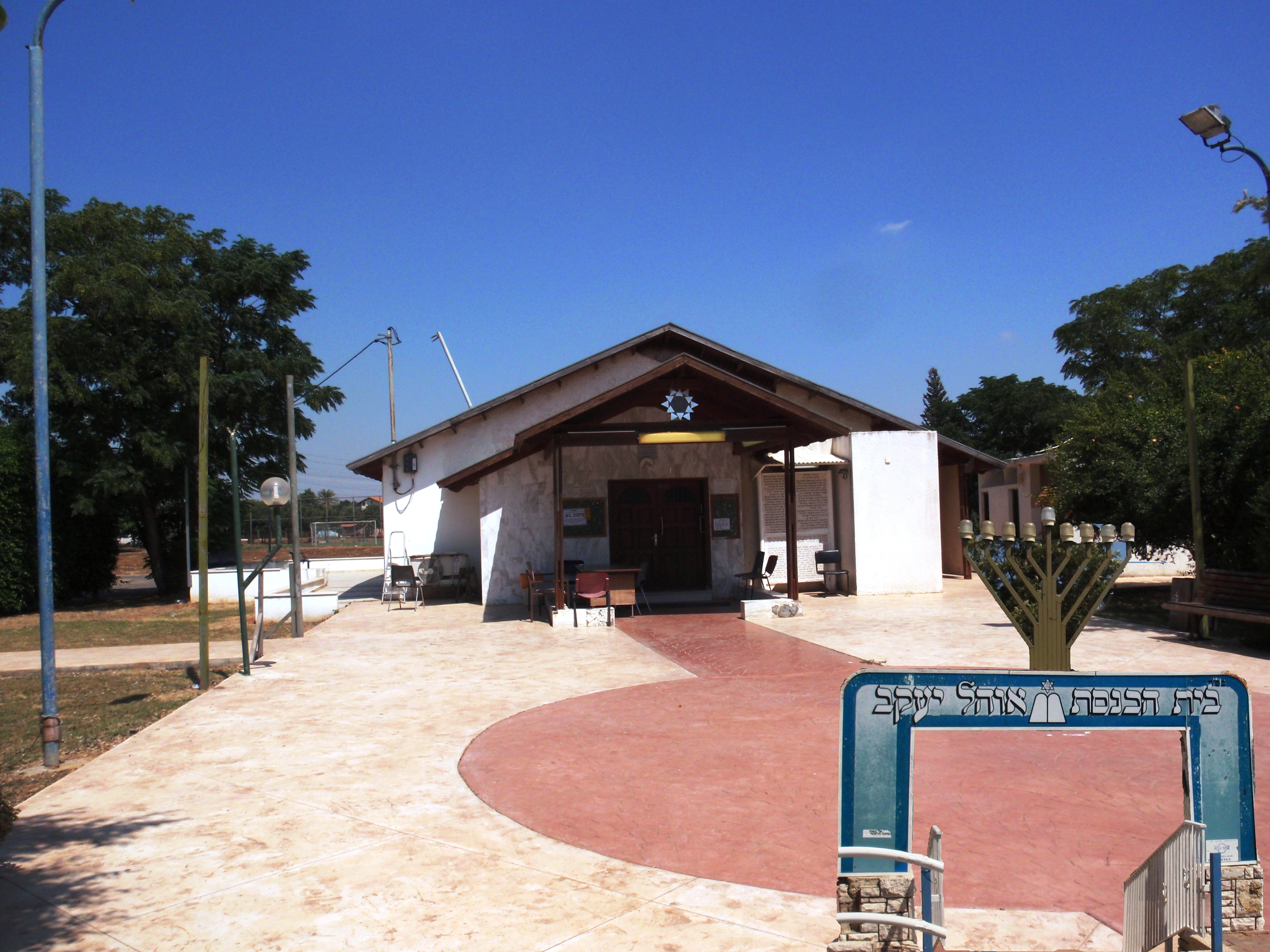

- Location within Central Israel
- Coordinates: 32°9′4″N 34°55′35″E
- Country: Israel
- District: Central
- Subdistrict: Petah Tikva
- Council: Drom HaSharon
- Affiliation: Moshavim Movement
- Founded: 1950
- Founder: Libyan Jewish refugees
- Population (2024): 1,229

Elishama (Hebrew: אֱלִישָׁמָע) is a moshav in central Israel. Located in the Sharon plain near Hod HaSharon and Kfar Saba, it falls under the jurisdiction of Drom HaSharon Regional Council. In 2024 it had a population of 1,229.

== History ==
The moshav was founded in 1950 by Jewish refugees from Tripoli (in modern Libya) on land located near the depopulated Palestinian Arab village of Biyar 'Adas. It was named after the Biblical character Elishama ben Ammihud, a leader of the Tribe of Ephraim (Numbers 10:22).
