= Horshim =

Kibbutz in central Israel

Horshim: חוֹרְשִׁים (Hebrew)
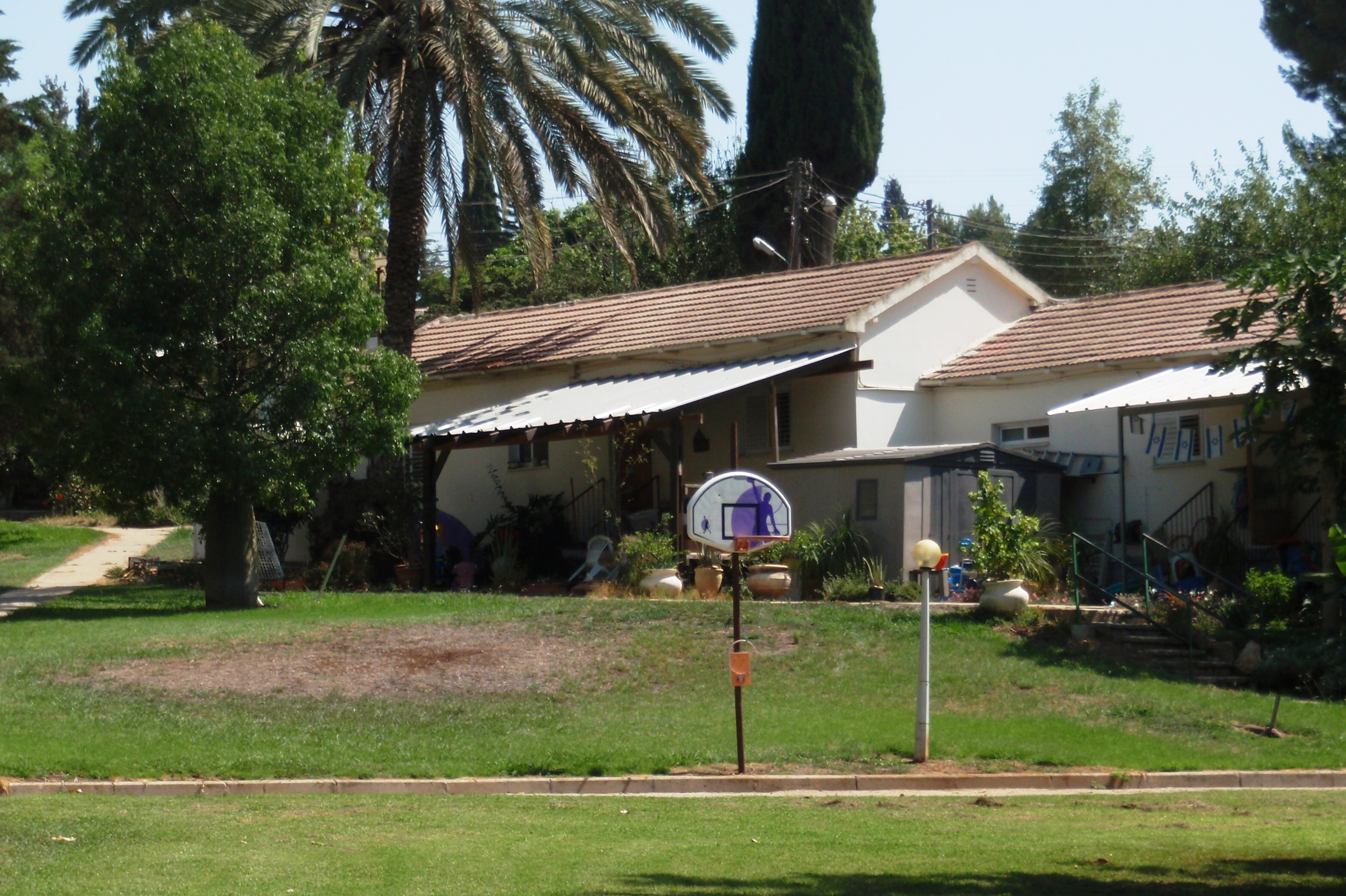

- Location within Central Israel
- Coordinates: 32°8′19″N 34°58′15″E
- Country: Israel
- District: Central
- Subdistrict: Petah Tikva
- Council: Drom HaSharon
- Affiliation: Kibbutz Movement
- Founded: 1955
- Population (2024): 320

Horshim (Hebrew: חוֹרְשִׁים, lit. 'Ploughmen') is a kibbutz in central Israel. Located in the south of the Sharon plain and covering 3,000 dunams, it falls under the jurisdiction of Drom HaSharon Regional Council. In 2024 it had a population of 320.

The kibbutz industries include Termokir (a building materials manufacturer) and various forms of agriculture such as a dairy and an avocado farm.

== Etymology ==
The village's name is taken from the biblical valley of Charashim (I Chron. 4:14)."
