= Neve Yamin =

Moshav in central Israel

Neve Yamin: נְוֵה יָמִין (Hebrew)
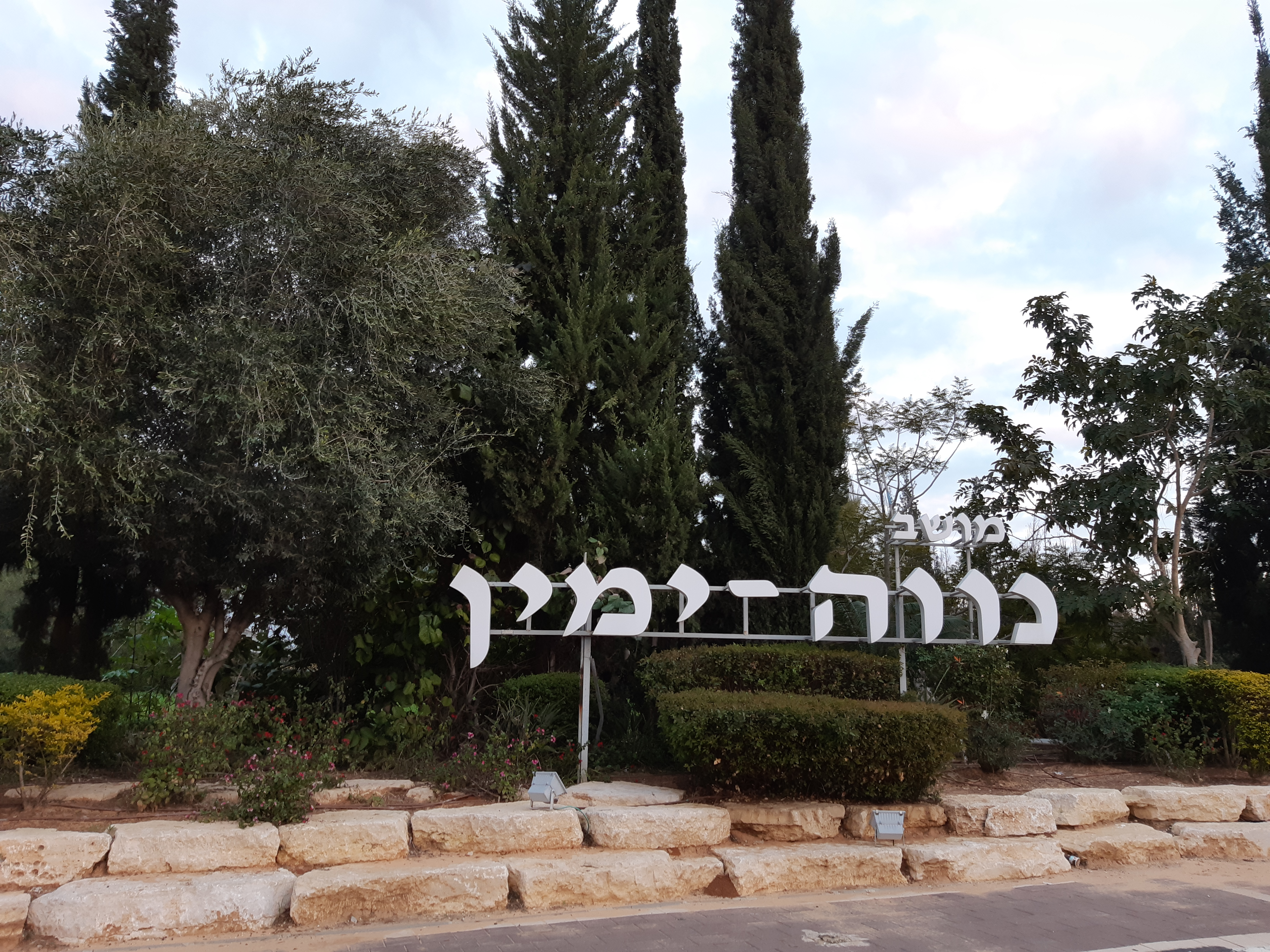

- Location within Central Israel
- Coordinates: 32°10′16″N 34°56′17″E
- Country: Israel
- District: Central
- Subdistrict: Petah Tikva
- Council: Drom HaSharon
- Affiliation: Moshavim Movement
- Founded: 1950
- Founder: New immigrants
- Population (2024): 1,377
- Website: Neve Yamin

Neve Yamin (Hebrew: נְוֵה יָמִין, lit. 'Abode of the right (hand of God)') is a moshav in central Israel. Located near Kfar Saba and covering 3,300 dunams, it falls under the jurisdiction of Drom HaSharon Regional Council. In 2024 it had a population of 1,377.

== History ==
The moshav was formed in 1950 by Jewish immigrants from Greece, Iraq, Persia and North Africa on land near the Palestinian village of Kafr Saba, which was depopulated in May 1948.

Its name is derived from the bible: "The right hand of God is lifted high." (Psalm 118:15).
