= Gan Haim =

Moshav in central Israel

Gan Haim: גַּן חַיִּים (Hebrew)
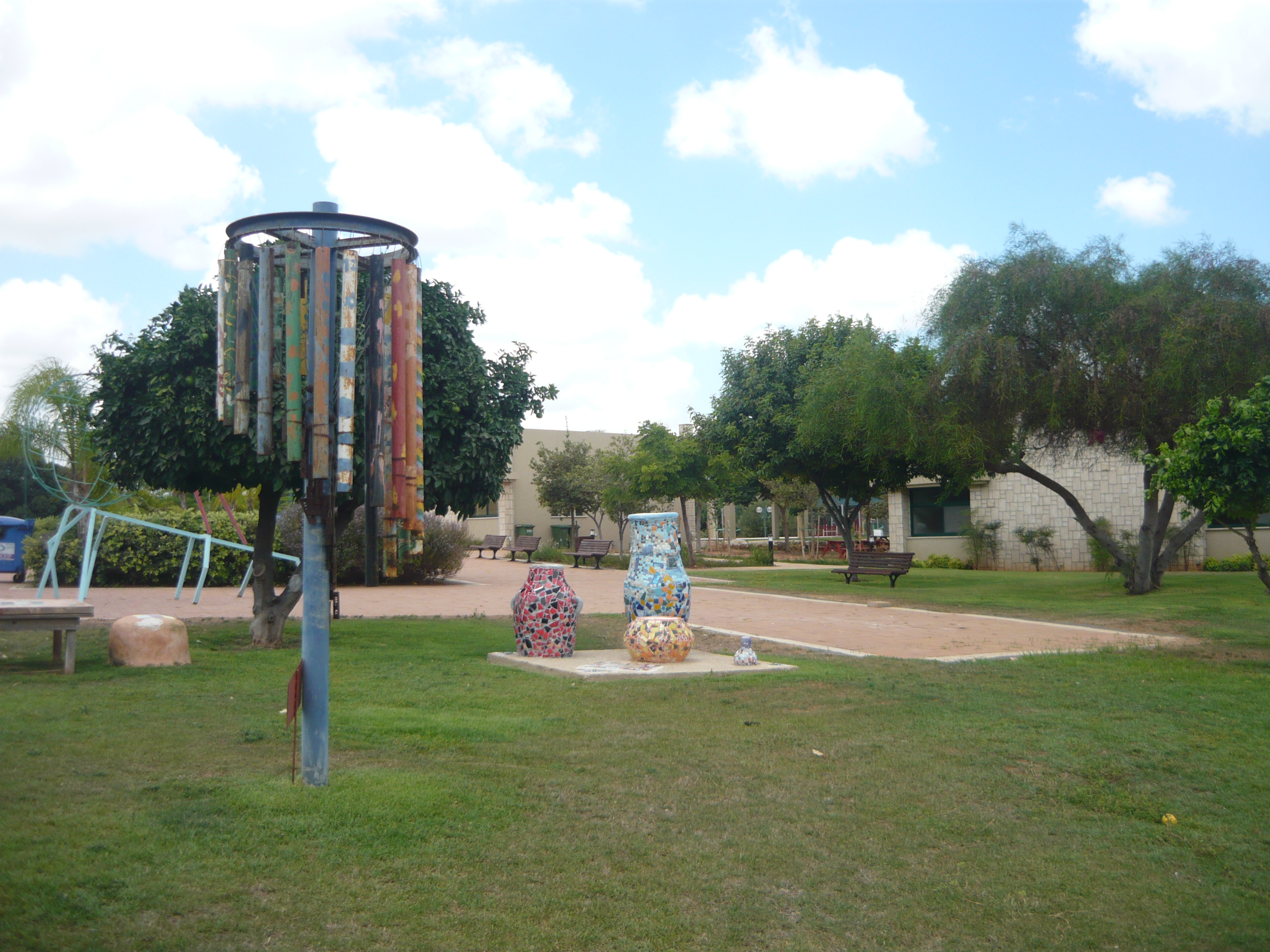

- Location within Central Israel
- Coordinates: 32°11′46″N 34°54′28″E
- Country: Israel
- District: Central
- Subdistrict: Petah Tikva
- Council: Drom HaSharon
- Affiliation: Moshavim Movement
- Founded: 1935
- Population (2024): 697

Gan Haim (Hebrew: גַּן חַיִּים, lit. 'Haim Garden') is a moshav in central Israel. Located in the Sharon plain near Kfar Saba, it falls under the jurisdiction of Drom HaSharon Regional Council. In 2024 it had a population of 697.

== History ==
Before the 20th century the area was known as Ghabat Kafr Saba and formed part of the Forest of Sharon. It was an open woodland dominated by Mount Tabor Oak, which extended from Kfar Yona in the north to Ra'anana in the south. The local Arab inhabitants traditionally used the area for pasture, firewood and intermittent cultivation. The intensification of settlement and agriculture in the coastal plain during the 19th century led to deforestation and subsequent environmental degradation.

The moshav was founded in 1935 on land purchased by the Gan Haim plantation company from residents of the Palestinian village of Kafr Saba. It was named after the Zionist activist, and later first President of Israel, Chaim Weizmann.
