= Sdei Hemed =

Moshav in central Israel

Sdei Hemed: שְׂדֵי חֶמֶד (Hebrew)
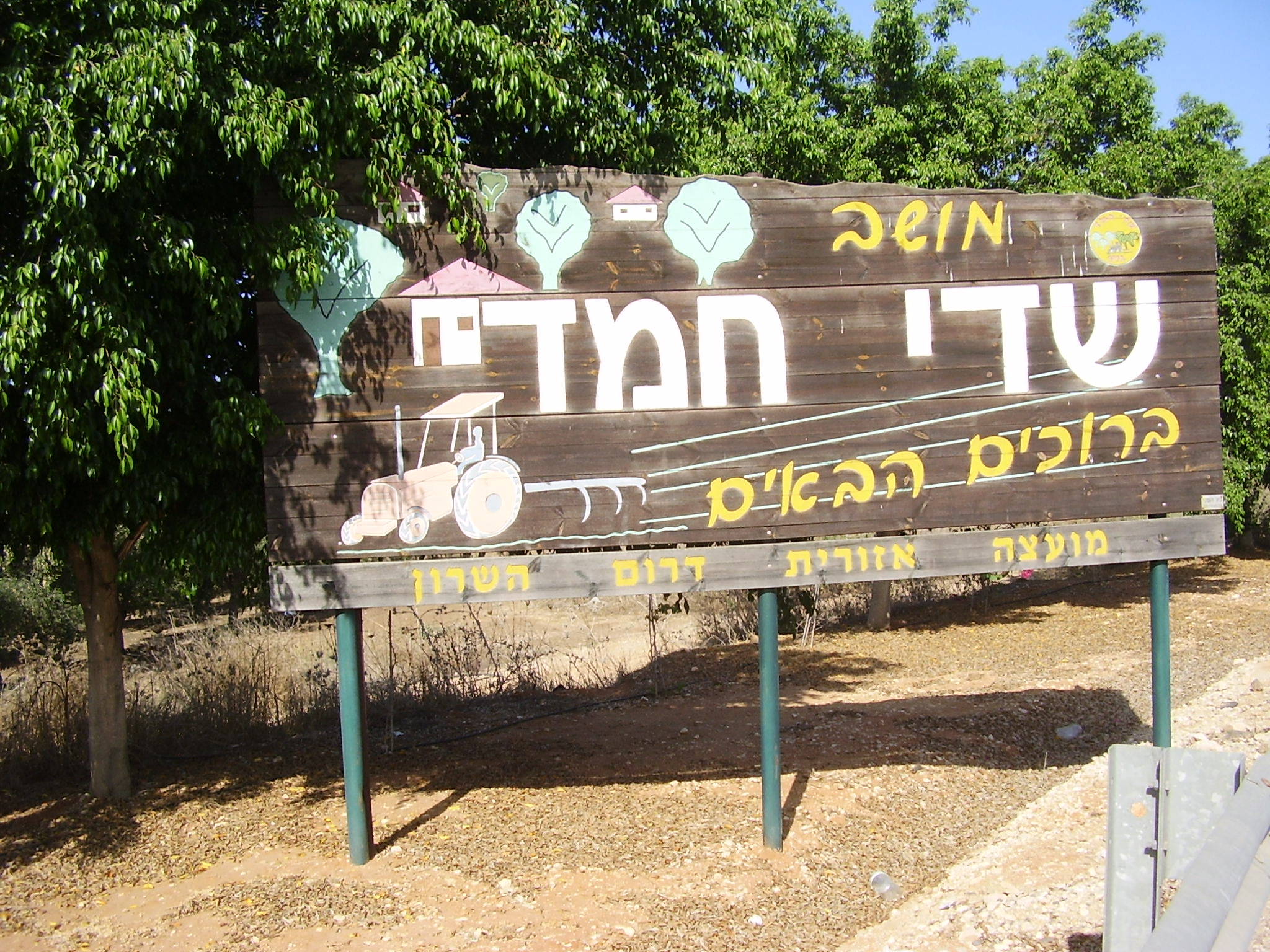
- Entrance to Sdei Hemed

- Location within Central Israel Location within Israel
- Coordinates: 32°9′36″N 34°56′34″E
- Country: Israel
- District: Central
- Subdistrict: Petah Tikva
- Council: Drom HaSharon
- Affiliation: Moshavim Movement
- Founded: 1952
- Founder: City dwellers
- Population (2024): 1,042

Sdei Hemed (Hebrew: שְׂדֵי חֶמֶד, lit. 'Pleasant Fields') is a moshav in central Israel. Located near Kfar Saba and covering 2,000 dunams, it falls under the jurisdiction of Drom HaSharon Regional Council. In 2024 it had a population of 1,042.

== History ==
The moshav was founded in 1952 as part of the 'From the city to the village' project. The name is based on a verse from the Book of Isaiah: "Smiting upon the breasts for the pleasant fields, for the fruitful vine" (Isaiah 32:12).
