= Nir Eliyahu =

Kibbutz in central Israel

Nir Eliyahu: נִיר אֵלִיָּהוּ (Hebrew)
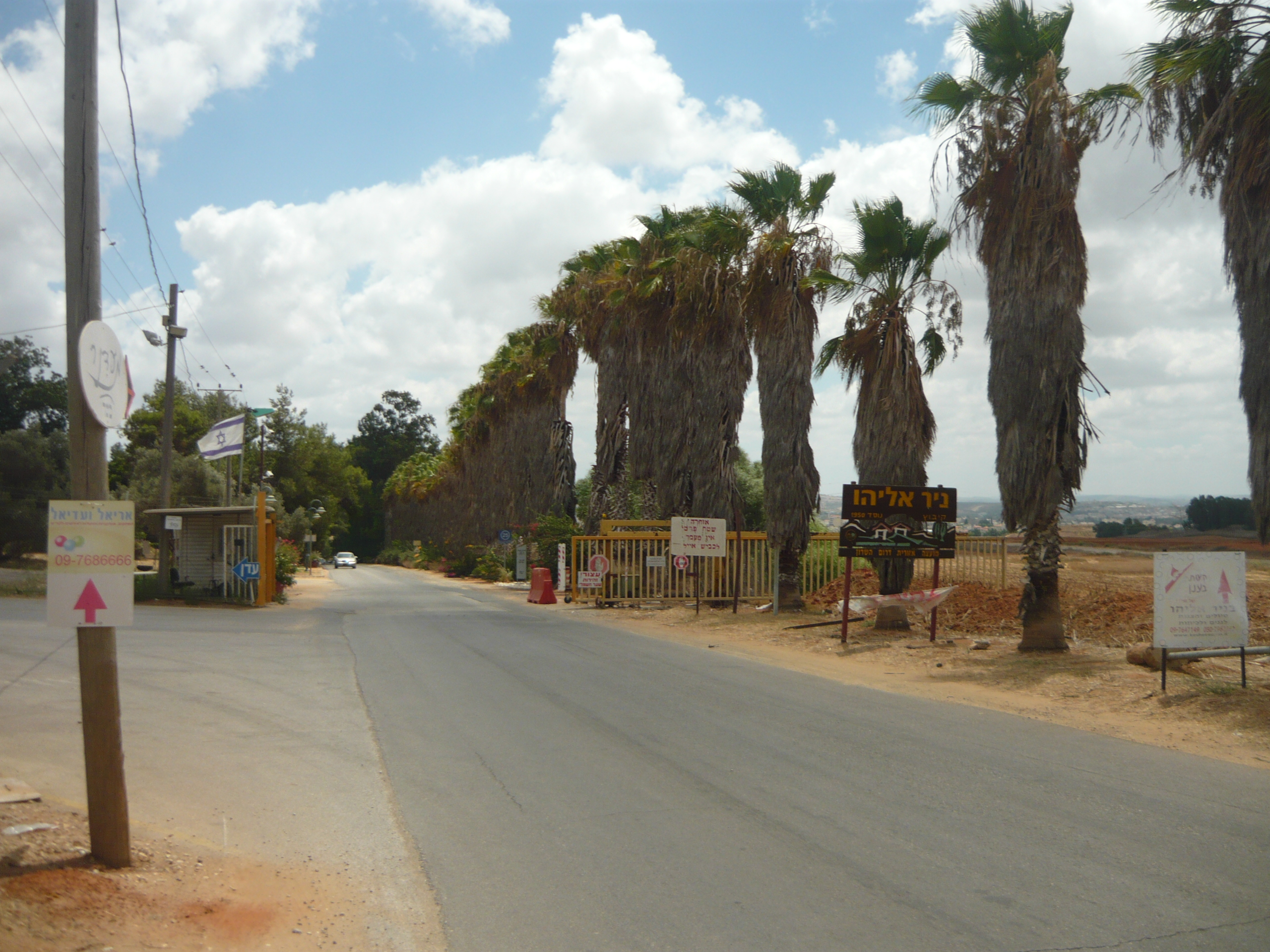

- Location within Central Israel
- Coordinates: 32°11′48″N 34°56′59″E
- Country: Israel
- District: Central
- Subdistrict: Petah Tikva
- Council: Drom HaSharon
- Affiliation: Kibbutz Movement
- Founded: 1950
- Founder: Turkish Jewish Refugees
- Population (2024): 586
- Website: www.nirel.org.il

Nir Eliyahu (Hebrew: נִיר אֵלִיָּהוּ, lit. Eliyahu's Meadow) is a kibbutz in the Sharon plain region of Israel. Located northeast of Kfar Saba, it falls under the jurisdiction of the Drom HaSharon Regional Council. In 2024 it had a population of 586.

== History ==
Nir Eliyahu was established in 1950, and was named after the chief architect of the Haganah, Eliyahu Golomb.

In 2005, the film "Sweet Mud" (Hebrew: אדמה משוגעת, Adama Meshugat) was filmed in Nir Eliyahu and Ruhama.

== Economy ==
In 1973, the kibbutz established a factory, Plastnir, for production of flexible polyethylene for specialised films for lamination, films for automatic packaging (FFS), printed and plain collation shrink films, bags on roll, heavy duty bags, high and low density bags, shopping bags, merchandise bags and sleeves for banana growers. The films and bags are sold to major retail chains in Israel, Europe and the United States, as well as to many industrial organizations in Israel.

Nir Eliyahu is site of one of Israel's wastewater treatment plants. The plant currently treats wastewater from kibbutzim, moshavim and towns in the region, including Qalqiliya.
