= Eyal, Israel =

Kibbutz in central Israel

Eyal: אֱיָל (Hebrew)
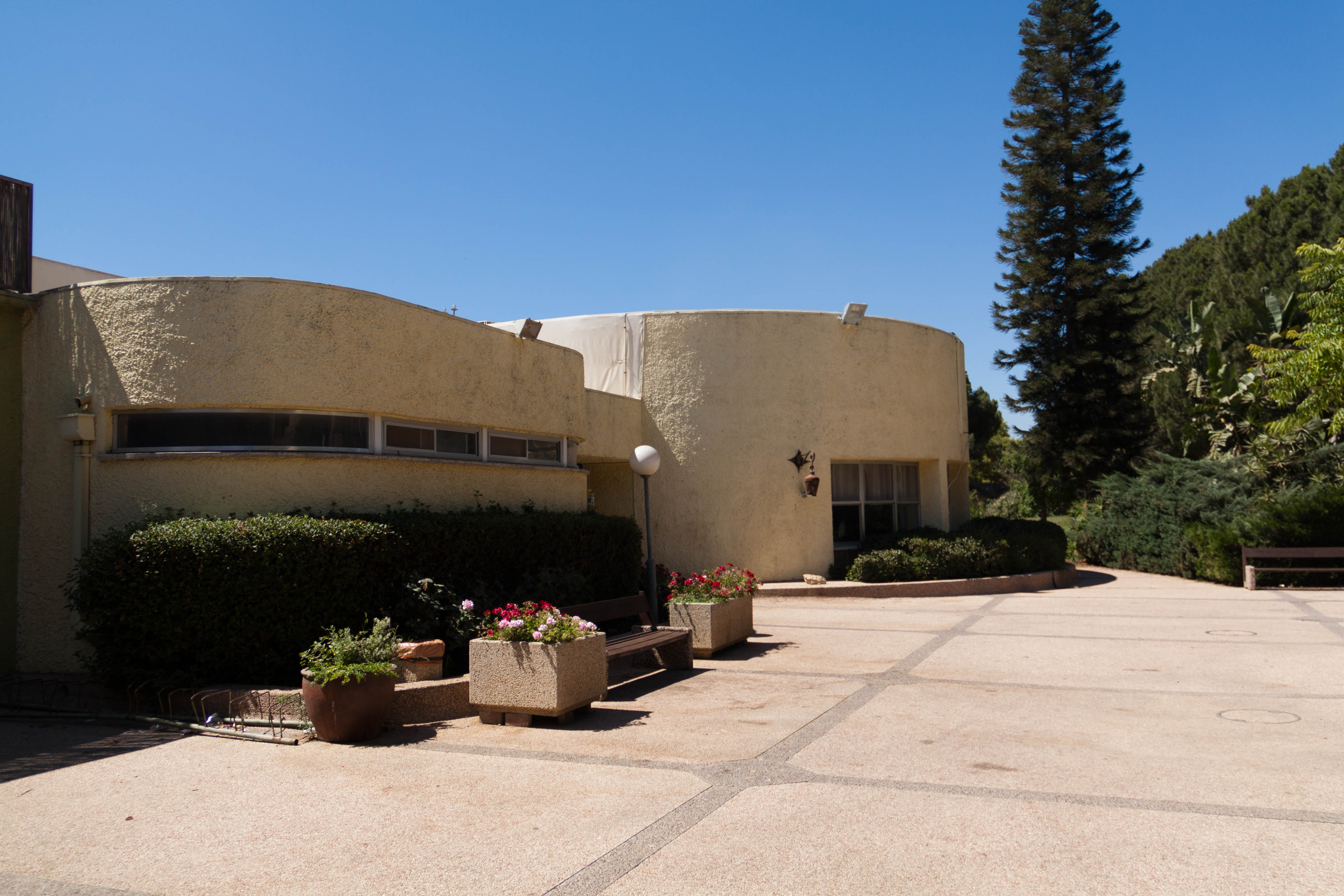

- Location within Central Israel
- Coordinates: 32°12′36″N 34°58′47″E
- Country: Israel
- District: Central
- Subdistrict: Petah Tikva
- Council: Drom HaSharon
- Affiliation: Kibbutz Movement
- Founded: 1948
- Founder: Nahal volunteers
- Population (2024): 639
- Website: www.eyal.org.il

Eyal (Hebrew: אֱיָל; lit. strength) is a kibbutz in the Central District of Israel. Located close to the Green line, it falls under the jurisdiction of the Drom HaSharon Regional Council. In 2024 it had a population of 639.

== Geography ==
Eyal is located in central Israel within the green line in the central Sharon region, and just to the east of Highway 6. It is approximately 6 km north-east of the city of Kfar Saba. Just to its north-east is the city of Kokhav Ya'ir, and west of the city of Tzur Yigal. To its north-west is the Israeli Arab city of Tira, and to its south is the Palestinian city of Qalqilyah.

== History ==
Eyal was established in 1949 by Nahal volunteers. Israel sought to establish security settlements along its borders, and Eyal was established on what was then the Jordanian border. It is just north of the West Bank town of Qalqilyah.

== Attractions ==
Keren Sahar Vintage Auto Museum houses a collection of vintage cars, featuring British automobiles from the 1930s and 1940s.

Saslove Winery has a temperature-controlled barrel room, a lab, and an open space where the club meetings and wine seminars are held.

In a field not far from the kibbutz sits a small domed structure, traditionally the burial place of Simeon, son of the patriarch Jacob.
