= Adanim =

Moshav in central Israel

Adanim: עֲדָנִים (Hebrew)
- Moshav

- Location within Central Israel
- Coordinates: 32°8′27″N 34°54′26″E
- Country: Israel
- District: Central
- Subdistrict: Petah Tikva
- Council: Drom HaSharon
- Affiliation: Moshavim Movement
- Founded: 1950
- Founder: Romanian Jews
- Population (2024): 466

Adanim (Hebrew: עֲדָנִים, lit. 'Delights') is a moshav in central Israel. Located in the Sharon plain near Hod HaSharon, it falls under the jurisdiction of Drom HaSharon Regional Council. In 2024 it had a population of 466.

== History ==
The moshav was founded in 1950 by immigrants from Romania on land located near the depopulated Palestinian village of Biyar 'Adas. It was initially named Yarkona BeHarhava (Hebrew: ירקונה בהרחבה, lit. 'Yarkona Expansion') before being renamed after Psalm 36:8(9): "You give them drink from Your river of delights."

During the 2026 Iran War, a foreign worker from Thailand was killed on 18 March by shrapnel from a cluster munition on an Iranian missile.
