= Kokhav Ya'ir–Tsur Yig'al =

Town in central Israel

Kokhav Ya'ir-Tsur Yig'al כוכב יאיר צור יגאל
- Local council

Hebrew transcription(s)
  - ISO 259: K̇ŵkab Yåʾiyr Ṣẇr Yig°ʾål
  - Also spelled: Kochav Yair (unofficial)
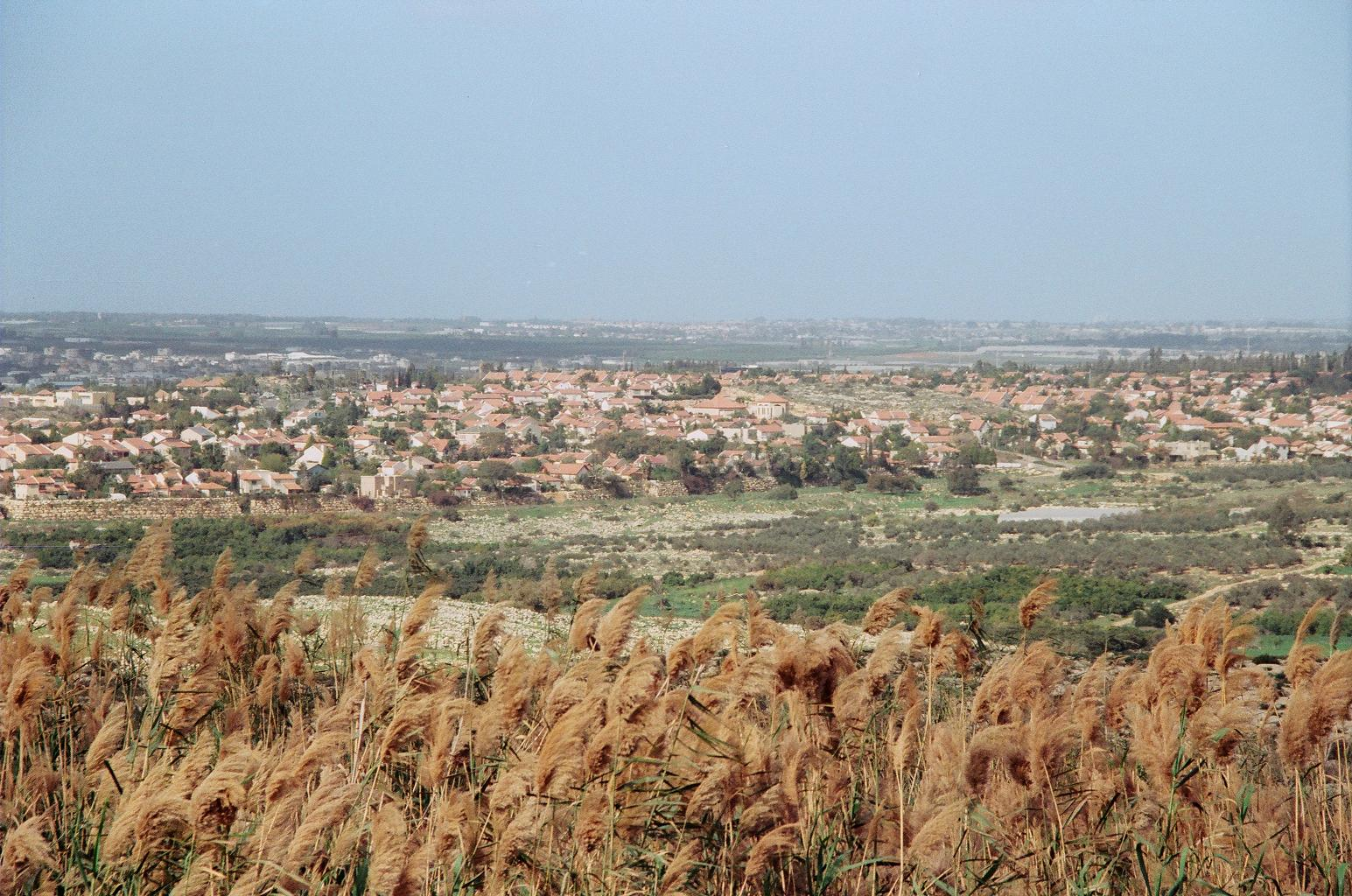
- View of Kokhav Ya'ir–Tzur Yig'al

- Location within Central Israel Location within Israel
- Coordinates: 32°13′14″N 34°59′38″E
- Country: Israel
- District: Central
- Subdistrict: Petah Tikva
- Natural Region: Southern Sharon
- Founded: 1986

Government
  - Head of Municipality: Hilla Ben-HaRosh Ḥakmon

Area
  - Total: 3,072 dunams (3.072 km^{2}; 1.186 sq mi)

Population (2024)
  - Total: 9,008
  - Density: 2,932/km^{2} (7,595/sq mi)
- Name meaning: Named for Abraham "Yair" Stern
- Website: www.kyair.org.il

Kokhav Ya'ir–Tsur Yig'al (Hebrew: כּוֹכַב יָאִיר צוּר יִגְאָל), is a town in the Central District of Israel. Kokhav Ya'ir and the neighboring town of Tzur Yig'al merged in November 2003. In 2024 it had a population of 9,008.

== History ==
Kokhav Ya'ir was established in 1981 by 15 families living in temporary quarters. Two years later, work began on infrastructure for a permanent town. In 1986, 550 families moved into permanent housing and the town was officially founded.

== Etymology ==
Kokhav Ya'ir (literal translation: "A Star Will Shine" or "Star of Ya'ir") was named for Avraham Stern, who went by the alias Ya'ir. He was the founder and leader of the Lehi group, a militant Jewish underground active during the British Mandate of Palestine. The name is constructed out of two words:

- Kokhav (כוכב) -> Hebrew for "star" (Stern is German for "star").
- Ya'ir (יאיר) -> in Hebrew, the word "Ya'ir" can function as a name (such as in Stern's alias), but also as the future-masculine-singular form of the verb "to shine" ("will shine").

Tsur Yig'al (literal translation: "A Rock Will Salvage" or "Rock of Yig'al") was named for Israeli Knesset member Yigal Cohen. The name is constructed out of two words:

- Tsur (צור) -> Hebrew for "Rock", named after the rocky, rugged and stony landscape of the hill.
- Yig'al (יגאל) -> in Hebrew, the word "Yig'al" can function as a name (such as in Cohen's name), but also as the future-masculine-singular form of the verb "to redeem" ("will redeem").

== Geography ==
Kokhav Ya'ir is located approximately 7 kilometres (4.3 mi) north-north-east of the city of Kfar Saba and 95 meters above sea level.. Neighboring the municipality on its south-west border is kibbutz Eyal, approximately 2 kilometres (1.2 mi) north-west is the Israeli Arab city of Tira and approximately 1 kilometre (0.62 mi) south is the Palestinian Authority governed city of Qalqilyah.

The Sapir Lookout in Kokhav Ya'ir attracts bird watchers who come to observe the semi-annual migration of many species of birds.

== Education and sports ==
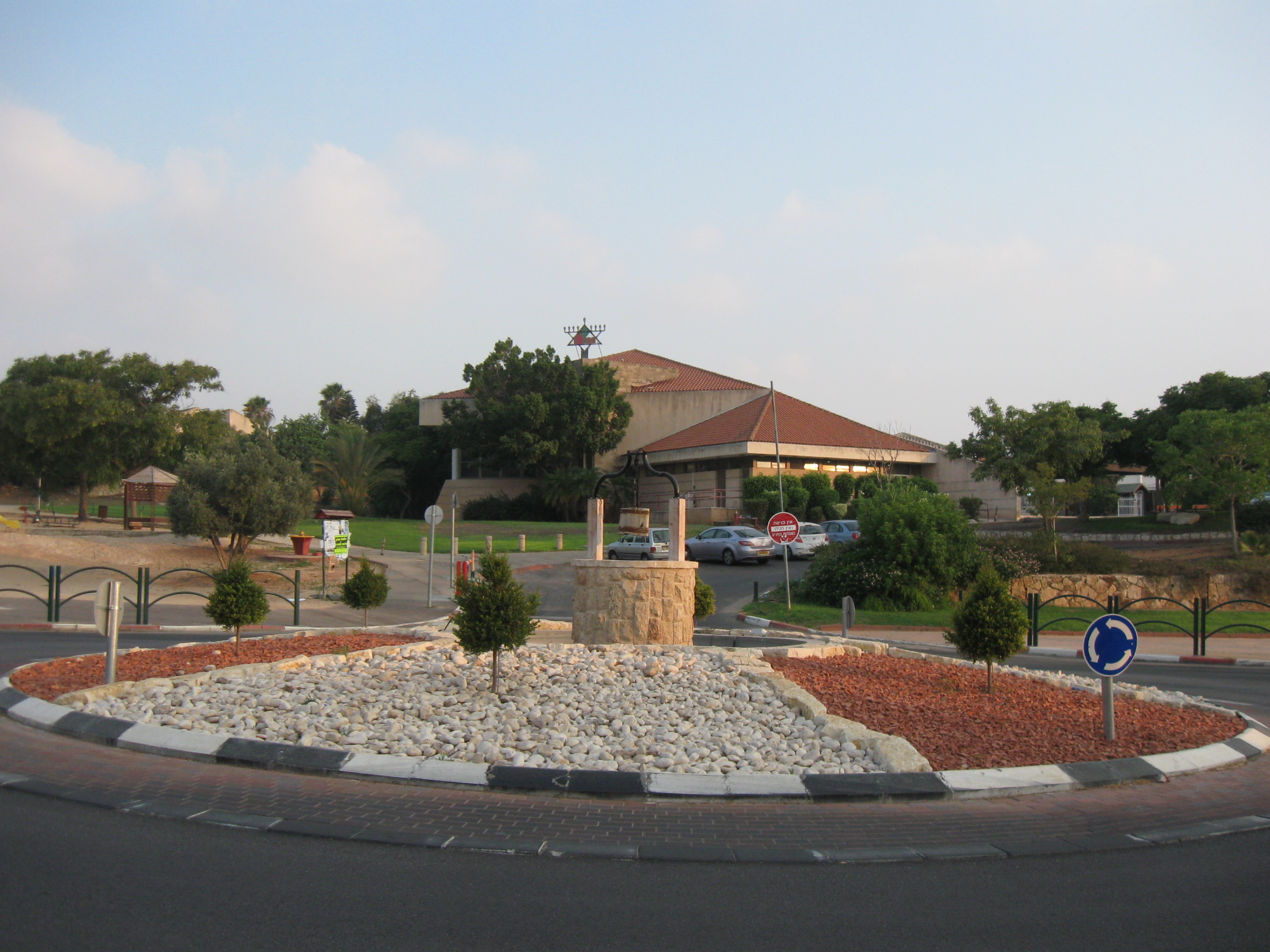
Synagogue in Kokhav Ya'ir

Kokhav Ya'ir currently has four schools, two secular elementary schools ('Keshet' and 'Nof Tzurim'), one religious elementary school ('Dekel') and one middle school ('Ramon', named after the Astronaut Ilan Ramon). After finishing middle school students are usually directed to highschools in Ra'anana and Kfar Saba and Herzliya.

Kokhav Ya'ir's local basketball team, Elitzur Kokhav Ya'ir, has been a member of the Israel National Basketball League since 2008.

Kokhav Ya'ir's country club from 2010 to 2017 refused membership to Israeli Arabs. After a petition from Tira, an Arab city nearby, the club decided to “sanitize” its racist policy by restricting membership to Kokhav Ya'ir–Tzur Yig'al's residents. A member of the local council said: “What drives people from the club isn’t the price, but the Arabs. We came to live in a community. Whether we’re racist or not, it doesn’t matter. The fact is that residents are leaving the community center because of the Arab children. It’s not clear why we can’t express our opinion.” The club is partially funded by the Israeli government.

== Voting Patterns ==
In the 2022 election, 74 percent of voters in Kokhav Ya'ir–Tsur Yig'al voted for the parties of the center-left coalition led by Yair Lapid, while 21 percent voted for the parties of the right-wing coalition led by Benjamin Netanyahu and 0.2 percent voted for the Arab parties.

In the 2026 election, 75 percent of voters in Kokhav Ya'ir–Tsur Yig'al voted for the parties of the center-left coalition led by Gadi Eisenkot, while 18 percent voted for the parties of the right-wing coalition led by Benjamin Netanyahu and 0.2 percent voted for the Arab parties. An additional 3.2 percent voted for the Reservists, and 2.7 percent voted for Amcha Yisrael. Voter turnout increased 8 percent from the 2022 election.

== Notable residents ==
- Ehud Barak (born 1942), former general and politician
- Shaul Mofaz (born 1948), retired military officer and politician
- Michael Eitan (1944-2024), politician
- Shlomi Haimy (born 1989), olympic mountain cyclist specializing in cross-country cycling
- Danny Yatom (born 1945), former politician
- Gideon Ezra (1937-2012), politician
- Michael Ratzon (born 1952), former politician
- Uzi Dayan (born 1948), former general and politician
- Nino Abesadze (born 1965), politician and journalist
- Dov Elbaum (born 1970), writer, editor, journalist, television host and philosophy lecturer.
- Omer Bar-Lev (born 1953), former general and politician
