= Yarkona =

Yarkona: יַרְקוֹנָה (Hebrew); يركونا (Arabic)
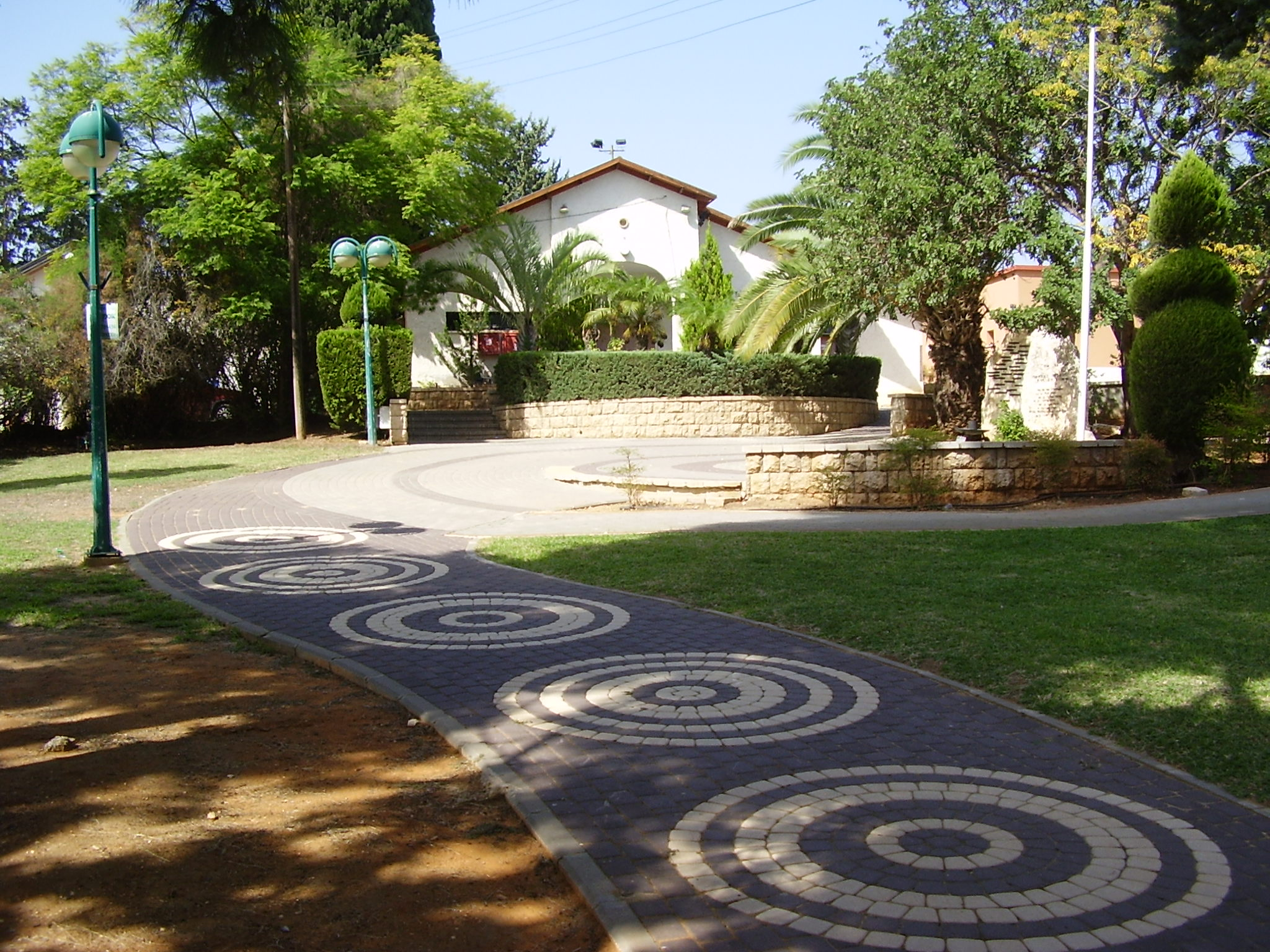

- Location within Central Israel
- Coordinates: 32°8′43″N 34°54′2″E
- Country: Israel
- District: Central
- Subdistrict: Petah Tikva
- Council: Drom HaSharon
- Affiliation: Moshavim Movement
- Founded: 1932
- Population (2024): 365
- Website: www.yarkona.com

Yarkona (Hebrew: יַרְקוֹנָה) is a moshav in central Israel. Located in the Sharon plain near Hod HaSharon and Petah Tikva, it falls under the jurisdiction of Drom HaSharon Regional Council. In 2024 it had a population of 365.

== History ==
The moshav was founded in 1932 and was named after the nearby Yarkon River.
