= Ganei Am =

Moshav in central Israel

Ganei Am: גַּנֵּי עָם (Hebrew)
- Location within Central Israel
- Coordinates: 32°9′3″N 34°54′4″E
- Country: Israel
- District: Central
- Subdistrict: Petah Tikva
- Council: Drom HaSharon
- Founded: 1932
- Founder: German Jews
- Population (2024): 278

Ganei Am (Hebrew: גני עם, גַּנֵּיעָם, lit. People Gardens) is a moshav in central Israel. Located in the Sharon plain near Hod HaSharon and covering 350 dunams, it falls under the jurisdiction of Drom HaSharon Regional Council. In 2024 it had a population of 278.

== History ==
The moshav was founded in 1932 by Jewish immigrants from Germany who were members of the HaOved HaTzioni group. It is no longer agricultural, and is only a residential village.
