= Tzur Natan =

Moshav in central Israel

Tzur Natan: צוּר נָתָן (Hebrew)
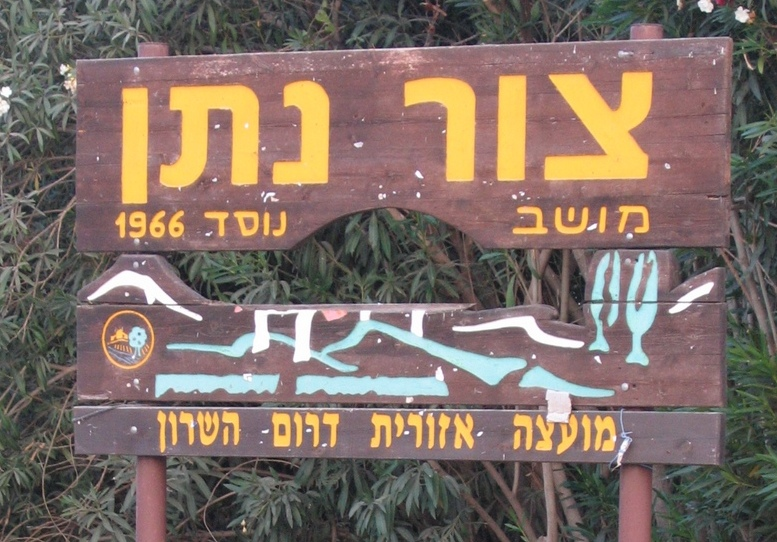

- Location within Central Israel
- Coordinates: 32°14′25″N 35°0′42″E
- Country: Israel
- District: Central
- Subdistrict: Petah Tikva
- Council: Drom HaSharon
- Affiliation: Mishkei Herut Beitar
- Founded: 1966
- Founder: Nahal
- Population (2024): 291

Tzur Natan (Hebrew: צוּר נָתָן, lit. 'Rock of Nathan') is a moshav shitufi in central Israel. Located in western Samaria on a hilltop 170 m above sea level, on a ridge in the foothills of the Samarian Hills and to the south of Tayibe, it falls under the jurisdiction of Drom HaSharon Regional Council. In 2024 it had a population of 291.

== History ==
The moshav was founded in 1966 as a Nahal settlement by Hashomer Hatzair members, and was named after Nathan Simons. It was civilianised a year later by former members of the Beitar youth group.

In 2017 a minority of Tzur Natan families agreed to sell their land to a natural gas and diesel power station to be constructed by Edeltech only meters from the Arab Israeli city of Tira.

== Archaeology ==
Excavations at Tzur Natan between 1989 and 1994 revealed a large Byzantine-period complex identified as a Samaritan synagogue. The building, oriented toward Mount Gerizim, included a main hall with an apse, narthex, atrium, and benches along the side walls, as well as several miqva'ot. Finds such as a menorah engraving on a basalt stone and oil lamps decorated with menorahs, together with literary evidence for a Samaritan presence in the area in the 5th century CE, led the excavators to attribute the synagogue to the Samaritans.

A dedicatory mosaic by the entrance mentions the village of Antesion, thought to be the ancient name of the site. A coin of Justin II (565–578 CE) found in the fill dates the synagogue to the late 6th century. The building appears to have been converted into a church before its final abandonment in the 8th century. To the west, excavators uncovered more than twenty rooms with oil presses, flour mills, and a wine press, which they interpreted as an agricultural and industrial complex belonging to the Samaritan community.

In 2019 a 5th-century mosaic with Greek inscription found at an ancient wine press. The inscription reads, "Only God help the beautiful property of Master Adios, amen." Adios was a wealthy Samaritan landowner.
