= Drom HaSharon Regional Council =

Coordinates: 32°8′1″N 34°54′40″E

Drom HaSharon דרום השרון
- Regional council (from 1980)
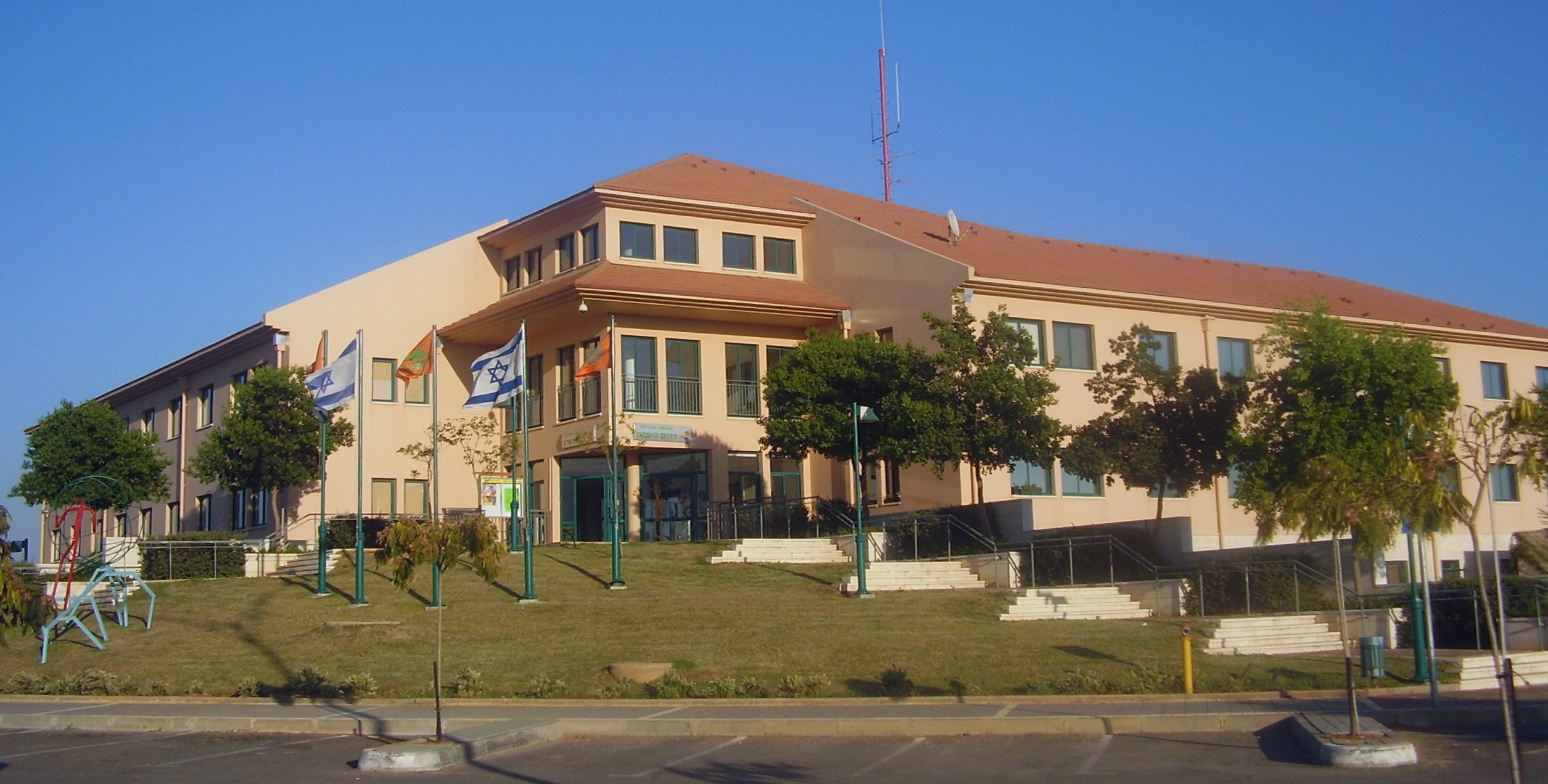
- Interactive map of Drom HaSharon
- Country: Israel
- District: Central
- Subdistrict: Petah Tikva
- Natural region: Petah Tikva, Southern Sharon

Government
  - Head of Municipality: Oshrat Gani Gonen

Area
  - Total: 96,760 dunams (96.76 km^{2}; 37.36 sq mi)

Population (2024)
  - Total: 34,936
  - Density: 361.1/km^{2} (935.1/sq mi)
- Website: Official website

The Drom HaSharon Regional Council (Hebrew: מוֹעָצָה אֲזוֹרִית דְּרוֹם הַשָׁרוֹן, romanized: Mo'atza Azorit Drom HaSharon, lit. 'Southern Sharon Regional Council') is a regional council located partly in the Sharon region and partly in the Central Coastal Plain region of the Central District of Israel. The council's headquarters are located on Highway 40 near Neve Yarak.

== List of localities (moshavim, kibbutzim and villages) ==
- Adanim
- Einat
- Elishema
- Eyal
- Gan Haim
- Ganei Am
- Gat Rimon
- Givat Hen
- Givat HaShlosha
- Hagor
- Horshim
- Kfar Ma'as
- Kfar Malal
- Kfar Sirkin
- Magshimim
- Matan
- Nachshonim
- Neve Yamin
- Neve Yarak
- Nir Eliyahu
- Nirit
- Ramat HaKovesh
- Ramot HaShavim
- Sdei Hemed
- Sde Warburg
- Tzofit
- Tzur Natan
- Yarhiv
- Yarkona

== Demographics ==
Historical population
Year	Pop.	±%
1972	8,900	—
1983	10,000	+12.4%
1995	12,400	+24.0%
2008	23,280	+87.7%
2022	34,314	+47.4%
2024	34,936	+1.8%

== Voting Patterns ==
In the 2022 election, 77 percent of voters in the regional council voted for the parties of the center-left coalition led by Yair Lapid, while 23 percent voted for the parties of the right-wing coalition led by Benjamin Netanyahu and 0.3 percent voted for the Arab parties.

In the 2026 election, 77 percent of voters in the regional council voted for the parties of the center-left coalition led by Gadi Eisenkot, while 19 percent voted for the parties of the right-wing coalition led by Benjamin Netanyahu and 0.3 percent voted for the Arab parties. An additional 2.9 percent voted for the Reservists, and 1.3 percent voted for Amcha Yisrael. Voter turnout increased 12 percent from the 2022 election.

== Twin Towns ==
Drom HaSharon Regional Council is twinned with:

- Neuwied, Germany.
