= Tzofit =

Moshav in central Israel

Tzofit: צוֹפִית (Hebrew)
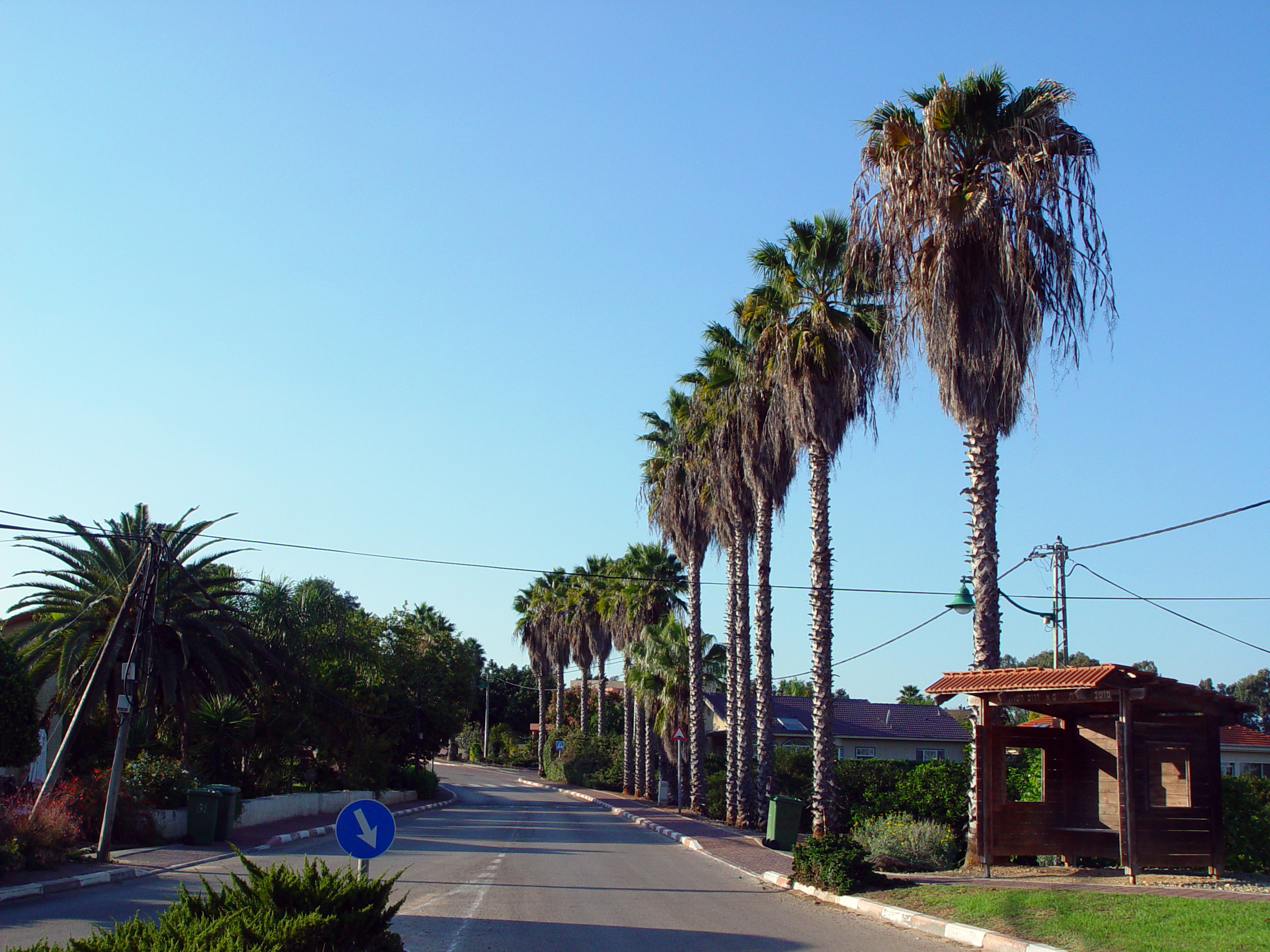

- Location within Central Israel
- Coordinates: 32°11′35″N 34°55′17″E
- Country: Israel
- District: Central
- Subdistrict: Petah Tikva
- Council: Drom HaSharon
- Affiliation: Moshavim Movement
- Founded: 1933
- Founder: Agricultural gar'in
- Population (2024): 1,178
- Website: www.tsofit.org.il

Tzofit (Hebrew: צוֹפִית) is a moshav in central Israel. Located near Kfar Saba, it falls under the jurisdiction of Drom HaSharon Regional Council. In 2024 it had a population of 1,178.

== History ==
Before the 20th century the area formed part of the Forest of Sharon. It was an open woodland dominated by Mount Tabor Oak, which extended from Kfar Yona in the north to Ra'anana in the south. The local Arab inhabitants traditionally used the area for pasture, firewood and intermittent cultivation. The intensification of settlement and agriculture in the coastal plain during the 19th century led to deforestation and subsequent environmental degradation.

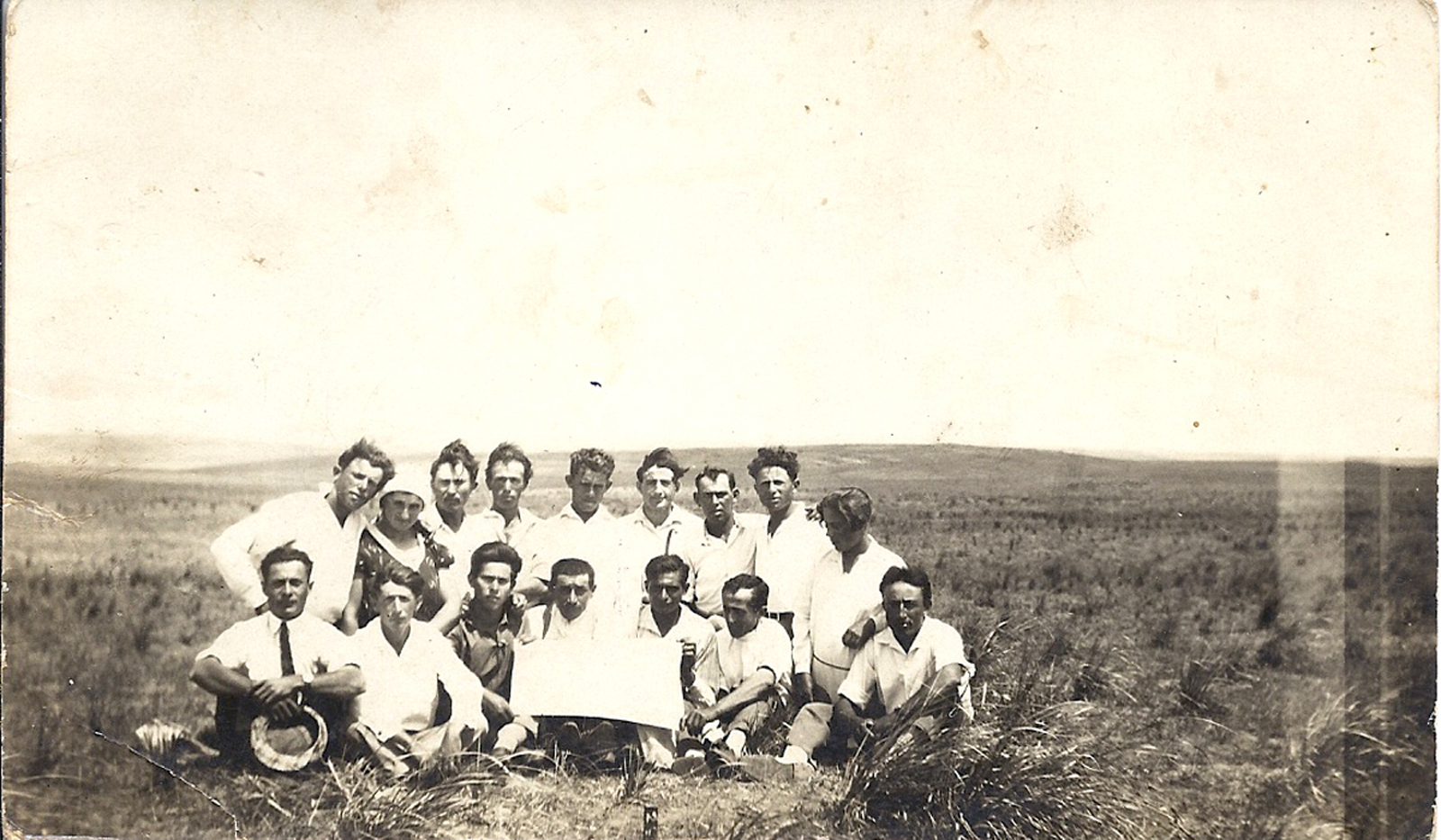
Founders of Tsofit, c. 1932 –1934

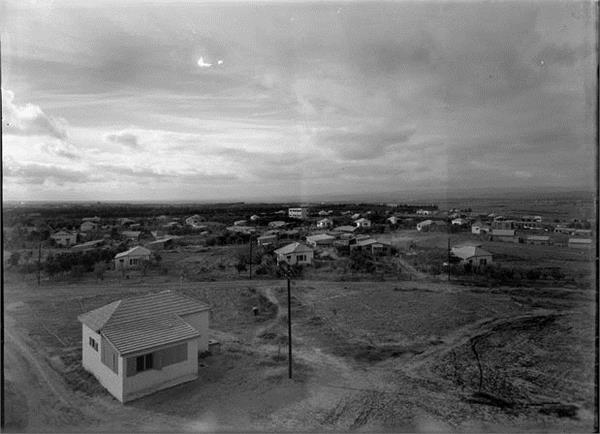
Tsofit 1940

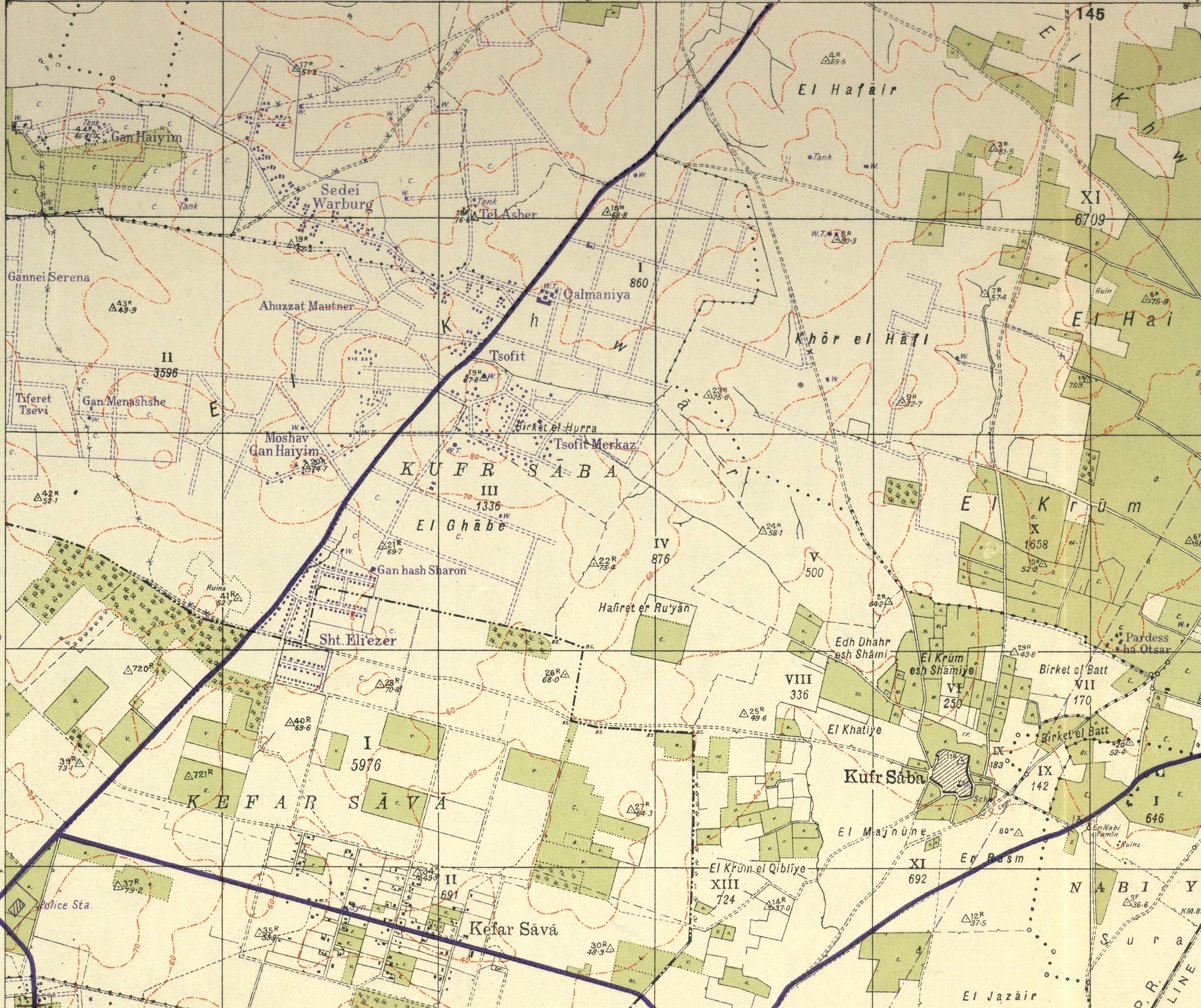
Tsofit 1942 1:20,000

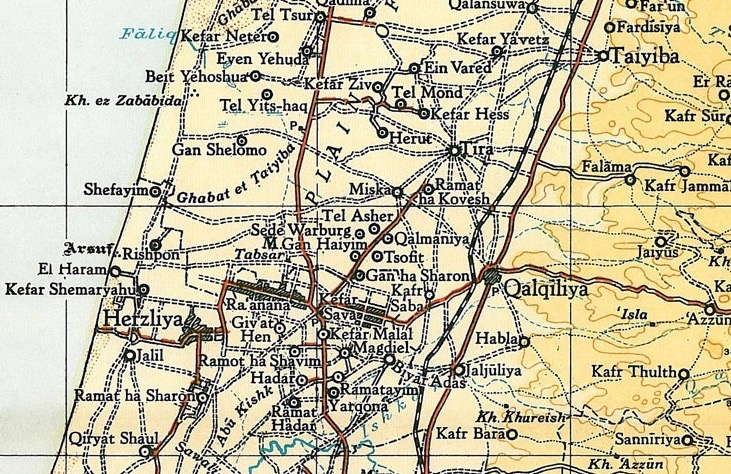
Tsofit 1945 1:250,000

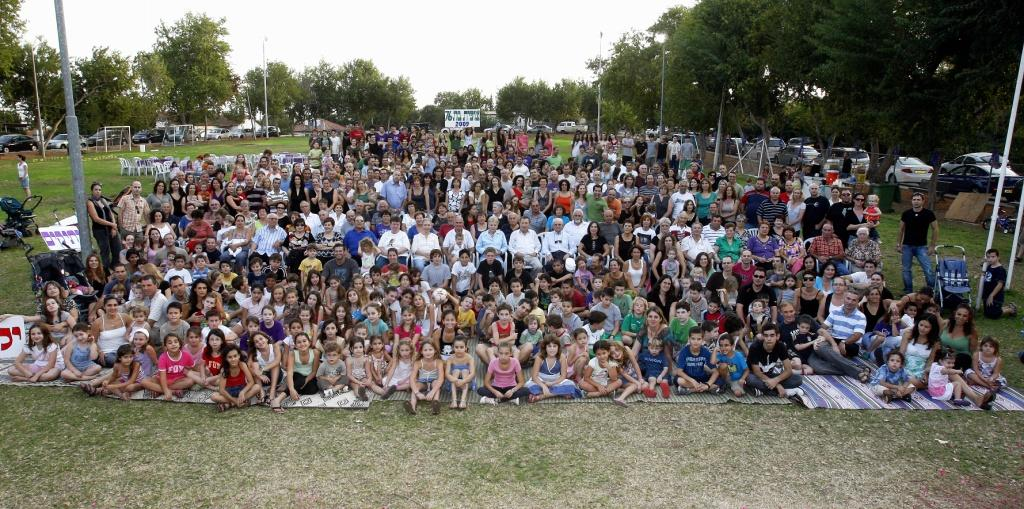
Residents of Tsofit, 2009
