= Petah Tikva Subdistrict =

Coordinates: 32°05′N 34°53′E

Petah Tikva Subdistrict נפת פתח תקווה قضاء بتاح تكفا
- Subdistrict
- Central District in blue, with Petah Tikva Subdistrict in dark blue
- Interactive map of Petah Tikva Subdistrict
- Country: Israel
- District: Central

Area
  - Total: 284 km^{2} (110 sq mi)

Population (2024)
  - Total: 838,354

Ethnicity
  - Jews and others: 92.1%
  - Arabs: 5.2%

The Petah Tikva Subdistrict is one of Israel's subdistricts in the Central District. The principal city of this subdistrict, as the name implies, is Petah Tikva.

== History ==
The subdistrict was created from an amalgamation of parts of Mandatory Palestine's Jaffa, Ramle, and Tulkarm Subdistricts.

== Demographics ==
Historical population
Year	Pop.	±%
1972	202,100	—
1983	294,800	+45.9%
1995	415,600	+41.0%
2008	602,680	+45.0%
2022	814,032	+35.1%
2024	838,354	+3.0%

== Administrative local authorities ==
Cities	Local Councils	Regional Councils
El'ad; Ganei Tikva; Giv'at Shmuel; Hod HaSharon; Kafr Qasim; Kfar Saba; Petah Tikva; Ra'anana; Rosh HaAyin; Yehud-Monosson	Jaljulia; Kafr Bara; Kokhav Yair; Savyon	Drom HaSharon; Hevel Modi'in (part)

== Voting Patterns ==
In the 2022 election, 49.4 percent of voters in the subdistrict voted for the parties of the center-left coalition led by Yair Lapid, while 46.4 percent voted for the parties of the right-wing coalition led by Benjamin Netanyahu and 4.2 percent voted for the Arab parties.

In the 2026 election, 50 percent of voters in the subdistrict voted for the parties of the center-left coalition led by Gadi Eisenkot, while 39 percent voted for the parties of the right-wing coalition led by Benjamin Netanyahu and 5 percent voted for the Arab parties. An additional 3.2 percent voted for the Reservists, and 2.2 percent voted for Amcha Yisrael. Voter turnout increased 15 percent from the 2022 election.

== Natural Regions ==
Districts, Subdistricts and Natural Regions of the State of Israel, 2018

- 421 Southern Sharon
  - Population (2024): 298,061
  - Largest city: Kfar Saba
- 422 Petah Tikva
  - Population (2024): 540,293
  - Largest city: Petah Tikva
