= Kidnapping and killing of Noa Marciano =

2023 abduction

Noa Marciano
- Born: Modi’in, Israel
- Known for: Her abduction to Gaza during October 7 attacks

Noa Marciano (Hebrew: נועה מרציאנו), was a 19-year-old Israeli soldier who was abducted by Hamas on October 7, 2023 from an IDF observation base on Nahal Oz.

== Background ==
Noa Marciano was born 12 October 2004 in Modiin, to parents Adi and Avi, and the older sister to Yuval, Itay, and Hadar. She was of Moroccan descent. She was serving as a lookout on an IDF base near the Gaza border in the Kibbutz Nahal Oz. Marciano was from Modi’in, Israel and served in the Combat Intelligence Collection Corps of the 414th Regiment in the IDF at the time of her abduction.

== Kidnapping ==
Noa Marciano, who was 19 at the time, was serving as a lookout at the Nahal Oz kibbutz military base near Gaza on October 7, 2023, when the base was overrun by Hamas militants. According to Channel 12, Israeli officials were warned about unusual activity by Hamas in the area hours before the attack, but dismissed the threat posed. Many of Marciano's fellow soldiers were murdered, but Marciano was abducted and dragged alive into the nearby Palestinian enclave.

Marciano's mother stated she was awoken to her first phone call at around 6:30 AM where she stated that she was in a safe room with her friends in their pajamas after being woken up by the attacks, and they could hear shooting outside. Those in the shelter were reportedly panicking and Marciano hung up the phone. Marciano's mother, told Haaretz that she called her daughter back at 7:30 A.M. "She [Marciano] told me she was in a protected space and that there had been an infiltration," Marciano's mother said in the interview. She further added that her daughter than told her mother that she needed to end the call, as they needed to stay quiet. Marciano's mother said during the call that she did not hear shots or screams. Half an hour later, Marciano's mother sent her a message again, but her daughter did not reply.

== Captivity and killing ==
In a photograph released a week after the October 7 attacks, a bound Marciano was shown with three other hostages. A week afterwards, the IDF officially informed Marciano's family that she had been kidnapped and taken into Gaza.

IDF Spokesperson Rear Adm. Daniel Hagari announced that Marciano had been wounded by an IDF airstrike on November 9, and per Israeli intelligence was then taken into the Al-Shifa Hospital in Gaza. On November 13, 2023, more than five weeks after her abduction, Hamas published a video of Marciano in captivity. The video depicted Marciano identifying herself, four days into her captivity, and then reciting the names of her parents and her hometown before showing her apparently deceased body with a head laceration and broken leg. The IDF said that it had sent officers to talk to Marciano's family after publication of the video, and called the video "psychological terrorism". Hamas claimed in the video that Marciano had died in an Israeli airstrike.

The IDF declared Marciano as deceased on November 14, and announced two days later that they had recovered her body on November 16. The Israeli military said that they had found her body in a building adjacent to the Al-Shifa Hospital and returned the corpse to Israel for burial. Hamas had denied accusations by Israel that the group had kept hostages at Gazan hospitals. An Israeli pathological report conducted by the IDF found that Marciano sustained nonfatal wounds in an Israeli bombing, but was murdered by a Hamas terrorist in the Al-Shifa Hospital.

In early December 2025, Marciano's father, Avi Marciano said he learned of his daughter's death in Hamas captivity through a video of her last moments. In the video, Avi Marciano recounted how he saw footage of a medical professional lethally injecting air into his daughter's veins after she was taken to Al-Shifa Hospital in Gaza City. "A medical professional decided to murder her," Avi Marciano said, describing seeing his daughter in the video "begging for her life".

== Efforts to release ==
Marciano's mother Adi traveled to the United States to raise awareness of her daughters abduction, and to thank those that had traveled or offered support such as the Palm Beach Synagogue.

== Funeral ==
On November 17, 2023, Noa Marciano was buried by her family and friends, with Marciano's mother telling mourners she would never forgive what had befallen her daughter, a teenaged conscript soldier. Family members of those still held as hostages and other Israeli's paused in their march from Tel Aviv to Prime Minister Netanyahu's home to sit shiva with Marciano's family after her death was announced. Marciano's mother, Adi thanked the families and stated she had been slated to march prior to the confirmation of death, and called upon the Israeli leadership to meet with the families of the hostages.

== Aftermath ==
On February 4, 2026, the IDF and Israel Security Agency (Shin Bet) announced that they had killed Muhammad Issam Hassan al-Habil, a senior Hamas cell commander in Gaza City’s Shati refugee camp, in an airstrike following what the military described as a ceasefire violation.

Israeli authorities stated that interrogations of captured militants indicated al‑Habil had “brutally murdered” Corporal Marciano while she was held captive in Gaza after being abducted on 7 October 2023. Marciano's mother said the family was told that those responsible had been held to account and described the outcome as justice even though nothing could bring her daughter back.

Marciano's sister Yuval enlisted in the IDF in early November 2024 as a combat instructor. Their father Avi, spoke about the enlistment expressing his concerns for his daughter and that there is still no national inquiry over the massacres and abductions by Israeli leadership.

== See also ==
- List of Gaza war hostages
- Nahal Oz Observers Memorial Monument
