= Nahal Oz attack =

2023 Hamas attack in Israel

- Part of the October 7 attacks
- Nahal Oz military base, a room used to monitor the Palestinian territory of Gaza, following the Hamas attack on October 7, 2023.
Date	7 October 2023
Location	Nahal Oz, Southern District, Israel 31°28′21″N 34°29′50″E
Result	Hamas and PIJ victory

Belligerents
(Palestine) Palestinian Joint Operations Room; Hamas; Palestinian Islamic Jihad	Israel

Commanders and leaders
(Hamas) Wissam Farhat (Hamas) Izz al-Din al-Haddad	(Israel) Shilo Har-Even † (Israel) Ilan Fiorentino †

Units involved
(Palestine) Palestinian Joint Operations Room; (Hamas) Al-Qassam Brigades; (Hamas) Shuja'iyya Battalion; Al-Quds Brigades	Israel Defense Forces; Israeli Ground Forces; Golani Brigade; 13th Battalion; 98th Paratroopers Division; 35th Paratroopers Brigade; 890th Battalion; Israeli Air Force; Israel Police; Israeli Border Police; Yamam; (Israel) Kibbutz Nahal Oz security team

Strength
Military outpost: c. 215 militants (65 first wave, 50 second wave, 100 third wave); Kibbutz: c. 180 militants	Military outpost: 162 soldiers (90 armed); Kibbutz: 16 security team members (4 armed); 11 Border Police officers Maglan and Givati Brigade reinforcements

Casualties and losses
Military outpost: 71 militants killed Kibbutz: c. 80 militants killed	Military outpost: 53 soldiers killed 10 soldiers captured 2 Merkava tanks disabled 1 Namer APC disabled Nahal Oz base set on fire Kibbutz: 2 kibbutz security officers killed 4 security forces personnel killed 11 civilians killed 8 taken hostage

The kibbutz of Nahal Oz and the adjacent military base near the northern Gaza Strip were attacked in 2023 as part of the October 7 attacks. In the attack, more than 60 Israeli soldiers and 15 civilians were killed. Some soldiers and eight civilians were kidnapped and taken to the Gaza Strip. According to the IDF, several bodies were also taken to the Gaza Strip after being killed.

== Background ==
Nahal Oz is a kibbutz situated in southern Israel, in the northwestern part of the Negev desert near the Gaza border. As of 2021, it had a population of 471 residents. Founded in 1951, it was the first Nahal settlement in the country. By 1953, it transitioned into a civilian community. A significant event in its history occurred in 1956 when the kibbutz's security officer, Ro'i Rothberg, was killed by infiltrators from Gaza. His funeral witnessed a powerful eulogy by Moshe Dayan, then Chief of Staff, which emphasized the challenges faced by Israel and the constant threat from its neighbors.

Following the 2006 Lebanon War, a eulogy by novelist David Grossman for his son drew comparisons to Dayan's earlier eulogy. In 2014, a young resident, Daniel Tregerman, was killed by mortar fire from Gaza.

Close to the kibbutz was the Nahal Oz military outpost of the Israel Defense Forces, which was located 850 meters from the Gaza border. At the time, it housed troops from the 13th Battalion of the Golani Brigade, two tank teams from the 7th Armored Brigade, an intelligence collection platoon from Unit 414 of the Combat Intelligence Collection Corps, and additional support personnel. In spite of its location close to the Gaza border, it was not designed to defend against a ground attack. The perimeter wall had gaps and holes, and the shelters as well as the command center were designed to withstand rocket fire only. In 2025, IDF Chief of Staff Herzi Halevi later remarked that he had known for years that the base was positioned in a problematic area, but that it was not moved for budgetary reasons.

The attack on the base was preceded by meticulous intelligence gathering by Hamas, which in large part relied on social media posts by soldiers which included pictures of various areas in the base. The IDF investigation concluded that social media posts provided such a level of intelligence that Hamas would not have needed a single spy to effect its plan. Hamas also used drones and IDF media publications. In 2023, IDF troops in Gaza captured a Hamas document detailing the plans for the attack, revealing that Hamas had managed to map out an exact layout of the base and knew how many soldiers were normally stationed there, as well as the fact that on weekends the number would be reduced by half. Hamas reportedly also built a mock-up of the base in Gaza to train its militants in capturing it.

Hamas' plan for the conquest of the kibbutz, which it codenamed "Operation 402", was also meticulously planned. Hamas possessed three aerial photographs of the area which identified routes of movement, IDF communication antennas, cameras, motion radars, guard posts, barbed wire fences, and dirt mounds. Hamas planned for its militants to conquer the kibbutz and fortify themselves there after taking hostages. The plan called for breaching holes in the fence with explosive charges, after which the raiding force would split into two groups. One group would raid the eastern part of the kibbutz, during which it would take over the clubhouse, dining hall, and kibbutz secretariat. Another would focus on the western part, where they would take over the visitors' center and kindergartens and blow up the kibbutz's communication antennas. Hostages taken by the first group were to be gathered in the kindergartens or dining hall, and the kibbutz grocery store was identified as a potential source of supplies.

Under international law, non-state-actors are not prohibited from attacking military targets belonging to state actors; "terrorist" attacks on military and military attacks on "terrorist" targets are equally permissible under international law. However, a UN investigation suggested that certain aspects of the attack on the Nahal Oz military outpost violated the laws of war, finding reasonable grounds that Hamas militants killed soldiers who were hors de combat. The attack on the kibbutz was illegal under international law, as is any attack on civilian homes by any party to a conflict.

== Military base ==
=== Attack ===
At the Nahal Oz base Hamas' Al-Qassam Brigades were joined by Palestinian Islamic Jihad's Saraya Al-Quds, (Note: Arabic: سرايا القدس, romanized: Sarāyā Al-Quds, also known as "the Saraya" for short, or alternately translated as "Al-Quds Brigades".) a more extreme group, who allegedly have closer ties to Iran. At the time of the attack, only one soldier was stationed at the entrance of the outpost, which was operating at reduced capacity due to Simchat Torah. Only 81 of the 162 soldiers at the outpost, were trained for combat, while nine others were armed but untrained. According to Channel 12, Israeli officials were warned about unusual activity by Hamas in the area hours before the attack, but dismissed the threat posed.

On 7 October 2023, at 6:31 a.m., Israeli field surveillance soldiers from Nahal Oz spotted two Hamas squads planting explosives at the Gaza–Israel barrier while on patrol. The bombs were detonated at two areas on a newly constructed barbed wire fence. Two soldiers from the Golani Brigade's 13th Battalion rushed to provide backup for the lone soldier guarding the base. At 6:38 and 6:41, two breaches were created in the Gaza–Israel barrier near the base, and dozens of militants on motorbikes, pickup trucks, and on foot stormed into Israel. Militants reached the base's perimeter wall at 6:45, while the Golani soldiers, who were under-equipped, began deploying to guard posts on the western side of the base. An officer in the base's command center activated a remotely-operated gun system to shoot at the militants as they headed towards the base, but as militants shot the surveillance cameras the monitoring screens in the command center began to go dark.

A tank stationed in the base attempted to position itself to overlook the border, but by then a wave of 65 militants had arrived. While battling soldiers inside the base, militants fired into holes in the base's walls, critically injuring the 13th Battalion's deputy commander. Between 6:48 and 6:56, the militants exchanged fire with soldiers in the base. RPGs were launched at the perimeter wall and the guard posts came under massive fire. At 7:05, the first militants entered the base. At 7:09, the surveillance soldiers left their stations and went to hide in the command center.

At 7:30, militants who were on the eastern side flanked around it and reached the entrance, where they engaged in a lengthy exchange of fire with the three soldiers guarding it, killing them after losing several of their own. They then went inside, and soon destroyed a large part of the post and equipment within it. The soldiers at the post were surprised, and most of them were killed. Meanwhile, Israeli Air Force drones and attack helicopters began arriving at the base at 7:30 and circled over it as the pilots and drone operators struggled to differentiate between IDF soldiers and Hamas militants, with the first drone strike carried out at 7:50. Throughout the rest of the battle numerous air and artillery strikes would subsequently be carried out inside or near the Nahal Oz outpost. The base was the site of the largest number of airstrikes in the battles of October 7 due to the presence of numerous soldiers directing them. Ultimately, 14 drone strikes and 6 helicopter strikes were carried out inside the base, and 150 helicopter cannon rounds were fired into the base. Another 77 drone strikes, 36 helicopter strikes, and 10 airstrikes by fighter jets were carried out near the base, with 1,600 artillery shells also fired at the vicinity of the base. A team of six Golani Brigade soldiers commanded by Major Shilo Har-Even arrived at the base in a Namer armoured personnel carrier at 7:41. At 7:46, Har-Even was wounded in the hand but continued to fight.

Five IDF surveillance balloon operators fought an extended battle against the attackers when they reached their position and managed to kill several of them before they were killed at 7:49. At around the time militants attacked a concrete bomb shelter holding 31 female soldiers who were not on shift at the time, only six of whom were armed. The militants threw a smoke grenade and two fragmentation grenades into the shelter. Fourteen of the soldiers, all of whom were injured to various degrees and four of whom were armed, fled the shelter. One was killed while running away and two took shelter in the base's clinic, where they were later killed when militants threw grenades into it. The remaining eleven barricaded themselves inside a room which militants then tried to enter before being dispersed by a drone strike. The drone operator was not sure of the identities of the militants and carried out the strike near them, causing them to flee. Militants also continued to try to break into the shelter with the rest of the soldiers remaining inside. One of the armed soldiers remaining in the shelter, Captain Eden Nimri, positioned herself at one of the two entrances to the shelter. She opened fire on the first militant to enter but more followed and Nimri was killed after running out of ammunition. Another of the armed soldiers, Sergeant Shai Biton, also managed to kill a militant before she was also killed.

Three tanks arrived at the base at 8:09 a.m. Har-Even's group of six Golani soldiers launched an assault to retake the base at 8:18, but came under fire from four locations. By 8:26 the assault had failed. All but one of the soldiers were killed, with Har-Even among the dead. One of the tanks inside the base was struck by an RPG, disabling it, while the second tank blocked the western side of the base to prevent kidnappings. Shortly before 9:00, the third tank spotted a wave of 50 Hamas militants crossing the border and moved to intercept them, firing at the militants and running some of them over before being disabled by RPG fire. A third wave of 100 militants arrived at 10:00, and at 10:20 seven surveillance troops were captured from the bomb shelter earlier attacked.

In the command center, staff officers and observers entrenched themselves and tried to communicate with the forces and direct combat helicopters to the militant squads. When the militants arrived at the command center, four soldiers fought to defend it: one Bedouin tracker and three Golani Brigade soldiers. They killed at least eight militants in a long engagement. At one point, a Golani soldier killed a militant with a knife in close combat. The armed staff officers in the command center did not fight. At around 11:58, after having failed to breach the entrance to the command center, the militants set it on fire, throwing grenades as well as a flammable substance which also released toxic gases that caused suffocation within minutes. As of 13 December 2023, the IDF investigation could not yet pinpoint the exact type of chemicals used. Of the 22 troops taking shelter in the command center, six managed to exit through a small bathroom window and a seventh escaped through another window to survive the fumes. The remaining 15 died in the command center. Among the dead were the four combat soldiers who had fought to defend the command center, and seven female observers.

Soldiers of the Paratroopers Brigade's 890th Battalion, who had been fighting at Be'eri and Kfar Aza, headed towards the base after being called in as reinforcements. They were joined by other paratroopers, a number of Golani Brigade officers, and members of the Israel Police's Yamam counter-terrorism unit. The reinforcements arrived at the base at 1:36 p.m. and began clearing it of militants. By 5:00, the base was completely cleared.

=== Casualties ===
In total, 53 IDF soldiers were killed—31 armed and 22 noncombatants—and ten were taken captive. An estimated 71 Palestinian militants were also killed in the fighting.

Among the dead were 16 female surveillance soldiers from Unit 414 of the Combat Intelligence Collection Corps. Their duty was to conduct reconnaissance on the border with Gaza as well as to operate the remote-controlled gun turrets stationed on the Iron Wall. Most soldiers at Nahal Oz were not provided a handgun or rifle to defend themselves, despite their military outpost being less than a kilometer from Gaza. These soldiers were easily defeated. The unarmed Unit 414 soldiers hid in a bomb shelter and almost all of them were killed or captured. Another 7 female observers from Unit 414 were captured and taken to Gaza. Of the latter, one was killed in captivity, one was rescued by an IDF raid a few weeks later, and five were released during the January 2025 Gaza war ceasefire after spending more than 470 days in captivity.

In addition to the seven Unit 414 female observers, three tank crew, two of them dead, were also taken to Gaza; they were returned in October 2025 as part of the Gaza peace plan.

Parents of the 18 and 19-year-old girls from the unarmed surveillance unit felt that their daughters had been abandoned by the armed officers.

“In the end, the ones who managed to escape the Emergency Operation Center were officers who left the girls behind. Since when do officers run away first? These are female soldiers without combat training and without weapons, and they ran away first and abandoned them. They were burned to death and it needs to be said.” - statement from the parents of Sgt. Roni Eshel, 19, an observation soldier who was killed on 7 October 2023.

The surveillance buildings at Nahal Oz and their computer equipment were destroyed within the first hour of the invasion.

== Inside the kibbutz ==
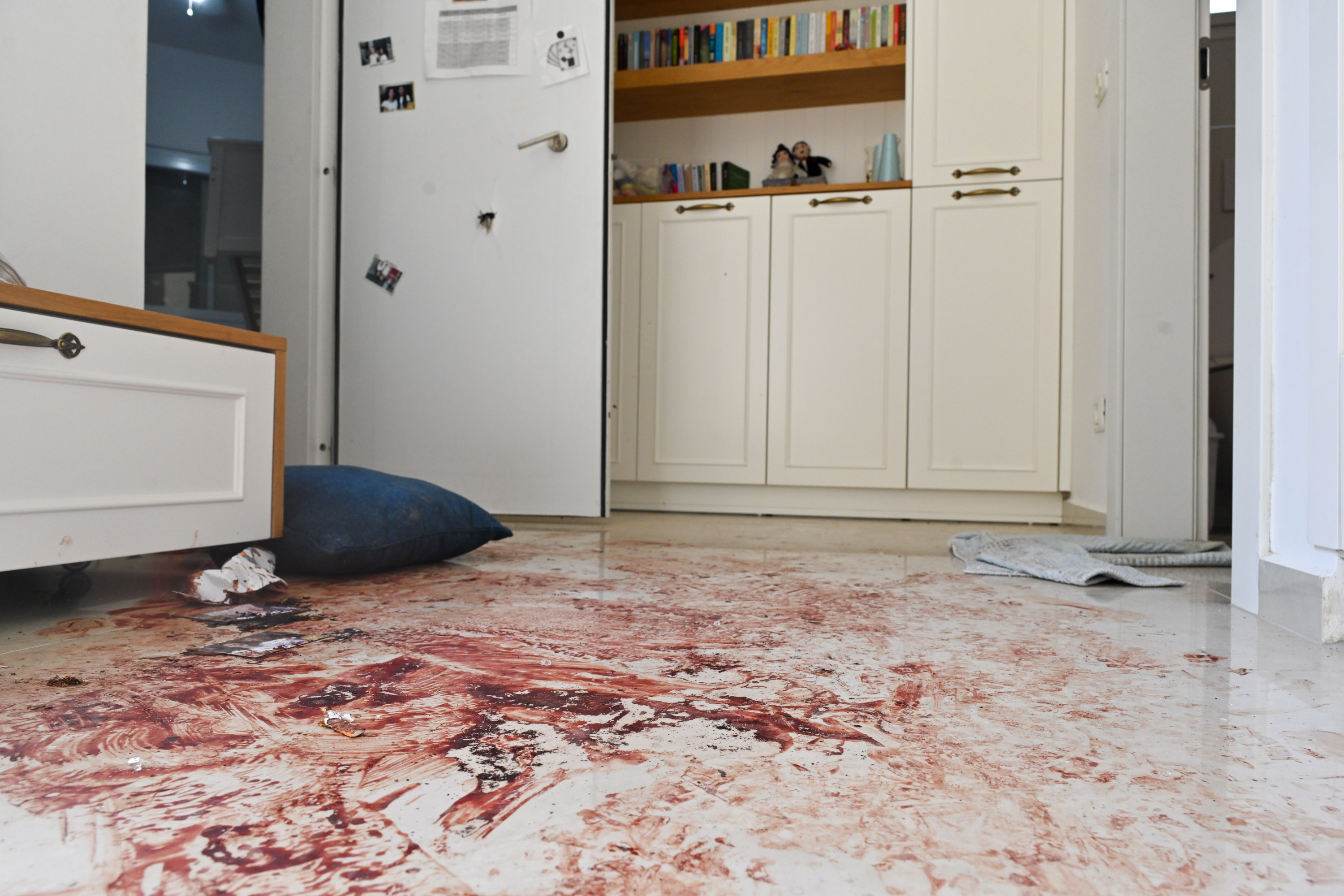
A blood-stained home floor in the aftermath of the attack

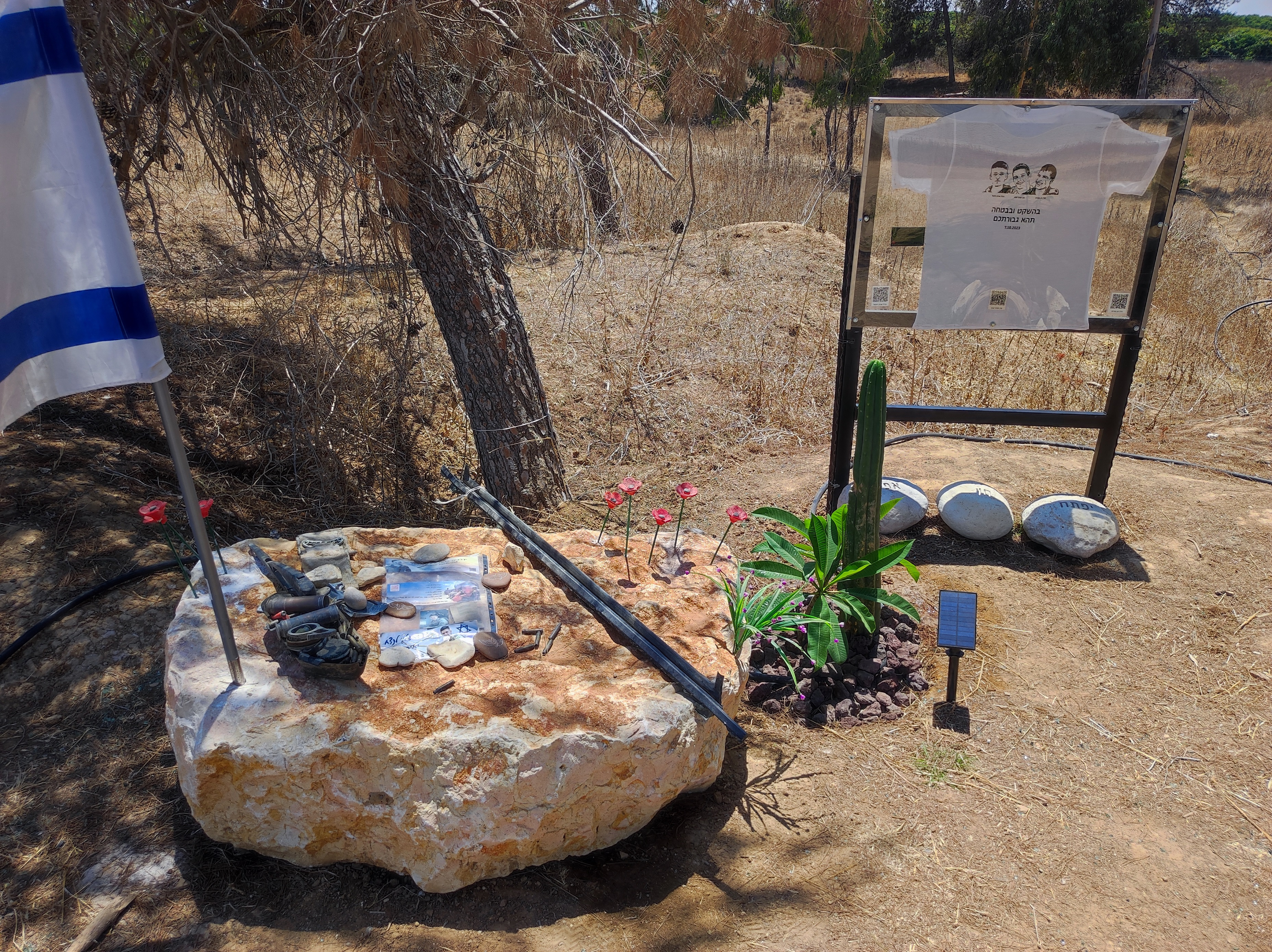
A memorial to the soldiers who were killed on their way to Nahal Oz

In parallel to the events at the Nahal Oz military base, about 180 militants attacked kibbutz Nahal Oz, which was defended by its local security team as well as a team of 11 fighters from the Yamas tactical unit of the Israel Border Police who had been stationed in the kibbutz at the time to deal with potential demonstrations along the Gaza border. At 6:43 a.m., a unit of Golani Brigade and Armored Corps soldiers led by Lieutenant Daniel Perez, who would later be killed while defending the Nahal Oz military base, updated the kibbutz security coordinator that Hamas militants had invaded Israel and were heading for the kibbutz, and set out to defend it. After finding that they were unable to enter the kibbutz due to rocket fire having knocked out power to the community's entrance gate, they drove to a hill at the northwestern edge of the kibbutz where they encountered a large number of militants. They opened fire and hit several of them, preventing the militants from entering the kibbutz.

At 7:05, the first militants entered the kibbutz through an area south of its back entrance, reaching the cowshed. The security coordinator, Ilan Fiorentino, spotted them as they headed towards a residential neighborhood, and called in the Yamas officers. He did not call the rest of the security team, as their assault rifles were stored in the kibbutz armory, which was inaccessible due to the power outage. Of the 16 members of the security team, four had access to weapons. Only the deputy security coordinator, Nissan de Kalo, had an assault rifle in his home. The Yamas officers headed to Fiorentino's location, but while en route they encountered another group of militants outside the fence. They decided to split up, with six staying to battle the militants they had seen and the remaining five moving on to join Fiorentino. At 7:15, the militants entered the neighborhood and were engaged by the Yamas officers, as well as Fiorentino and de Kalo, killing many of them. The Yamas team commander, First Sergeant Shlomo Yaakov Krasniansky, and Fiorentino were killed and the other Yamas officers were wounded. In addition, the militants killed a resident who had been hiding in the reinforced safe room of her home nearby.

Over the following hours, the Yamas officers battled invading militants throughout the kibbutz, joined by de Kalo and another member of the security team, Barry Meyerowitz. They used the security team's Land Rover Defender and a Border Police Wolf Armoured Vehicle to drive around the kibbutz and engage militants in various locations, with Meyerowitz monitoring the kibbutz's WhatsApp group to learn the locations of militants from residents. At various times the defenders dismounted to fight while in other times the fighting was conducted from within the vehicles. The vehicles constantly took fire, and after the Defender was disabled by close-range fire, de Kalo and Meyerowitz abandoned it and entered the Wolf Armoured Vehicle. During the initial three hours of fighting, the first wave of militants was largely held back. Although a widespread massacre had at that point been prevented, the remaining militants managed to target the homes of elderly residents, killing two men. One of them, Shlomo Ron, who was among the founders of the kibbutz, sacrificed himself to save his wife, daughters, and grandson who were at his home by sitting in his living room and awaiting the militants while his family sheltered in the home's safe room, giving the appearance that he was alone. The militants shot him dead but did not proceed to search the house, ensuring that his family remained hidden. At 10:00 a.m., a second wave of Hamas militants breached the kibbutz and over the following hours carried out numerous murders and abductions.

A team of five soldiers from the Maglan commando unit in a light Jeep Wrangler was sent to the kibbutz. At 12:05 p.m., they encountered a group of militants on the road leading to the kibbutz and engaged them, killing at least five. Three Maglan soldiers, including the team's commander and deputy commander, were also killed. The two surviving soldiers continued to fight and radio for backup. The clash delayed the arrival of reinforcements to the kibbutz for about an hour. A force of about 70 Maglan troops arrived at the kibbutz at about 1:15 p.m. after advancing through nearby fields to avoid ambushes. The last known hostage abduction took place at the rear gate at around the same time. A third Maglan unit also arrived, having been joined by a wounded Yamam counter-terrorism officer who refused to be evacuated as well as retired IDF General Noam Tibon, who had set out from Tel Aviv to rescue his son, Haaretz journalist and Nahal Oz resident Amir Tibon.

At this stage, the Maglan soldiers were joined by troops of the Givati Brigade's reconnaissance unit who had originally headed for Sderot before they diverted to Nahal Oz. Although the Givati reconnaissance unit's officers claimed to have arrived at 11:00 a.m., this claim did not align with testimonies of kibbutz security team members. The IDF probe also found that the Givati troops arrived at about 1:15 p.m. along with the Maglan forces. At 1:45 p.m., the Maglan troops entered the kibbutz and began to clear it of militants. The Givati reconnaissance force was ordered to hold their position near a gate for evacuation operations. The Givati troops were joined by an unauthorized group including an officer, cadet, and a man claiming to be a former Yamas officer in a police cap and civilian clothes, and acting against orders the group began to clear buildings, during which they killed a member of the kibbutz security team who had been defending his home with his son's army weapon after mistaking him for a militant. By 5:30 p.m., the kibbutz had been cleared. About an hour later, troops began to evacuate civilians from the kibbutz. After regaining control of the kibbutz, the IDF continued to engage isolated attempts by militants to enter the kibbutz via motorcycles and vehicles.

The civilian casualty toll was initially reported as 12 killed and 20 missing. Later reports claimed that fifteen civilians from Nahal Oz were killed, including a student from Tanzania, whose body was taken hostage. In total eight hostages were taken from Nahal Oz to the Gaza Strip. The IDF investigation, released in March 2025, confirmed that a total of 13 residents including two members of the security team and two foreign nationals were killed in the attack. Three of the dead, a mother and son and a member of the security team, were found to have been killed by friendly fire. Among the victims were Israel Hayom photographer Yaniv Zohar and most of his family. Four other security personnel were also killed in the fighting. Eight kibbutz members were taken hostage. According to the IDF investigation, an estimated 80 militants were killed in the fighting in and around the kibbutz.

Although Hamas succeeded in inflicting casualties and abducting residents, their plan to completely overrun the kibbutz failed due to the determined resistance put up by the kibbutz security team and Yamas officers. At no stage in the fighting was the kibbutz completely under their control.

Residents of the Nahal Oz community were allowed to return to their homes, under various restrictions, only in April 2024.

== See also ==
- List of military engagements during the Gaza war
- Timeline of the Israeli–Palestinian conflict in 2023
- Outline of the Gaza war
- Palestinian political violence
- Moshe Dayan's eulogy for Ro'i Rothberg
- Kidnapping of Naama Levy
- Kidnapping of Liri Albag
- Rescue of Ori Megidish
- Agam Berger
- Matan Angrest
- Kidnapping and killing of Noa Marciano
- Nahal Oz Observers Memorial Monument
- 2014 Nahal Oz attack, a Hamas attack against the Nahal Oz military outpost during the 2014 Gaza War
