= Moshe Dayan's eulogy for Ro'i Rothberg =

Speech by Moshe Dayan, 1956

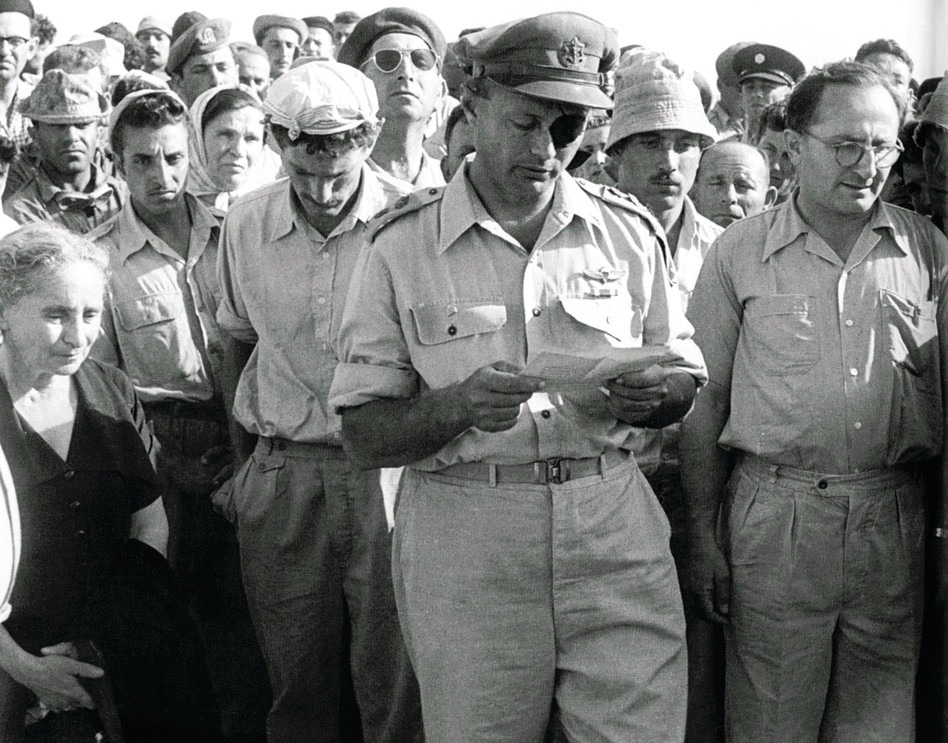
Moshe Dayan giving the euology at Rothberg's funeral

In 1956, Israeli Chief of Staff Moshe Dayan gave a eulogy for Ro'i Rothberg, a kibbutz security officer killed near the Gaza Strip. Dayan's eulogy is considered one of the most influential speeches in Israeli history.

== Background ==
=== Situation in the area ===
Nahal Oz became a kibbutz in 1953, and was frequently in conflict with Arabs who crossed the nearby armistice line from Gaza to reap crops and conduct petty theft. The previous few months had been relatively quiet on the Israel's borders with Egypt and Gaza, but escalated with several cross-border shootings in early April. On April 4, three Israeli soldiers were killed by Egyptian forces on the Gaza border. Israel responded the next day by shelling the center of Gaza City, killing 58 Egyptian and Palestinian civilians, as well as 4 Egyptian soldiers. Egypt responded by resuming fedayeen attacks across the border, killing 14 Israelis during the period between 11 and 17 April.

=== Ro'i Rothberg's biography ===
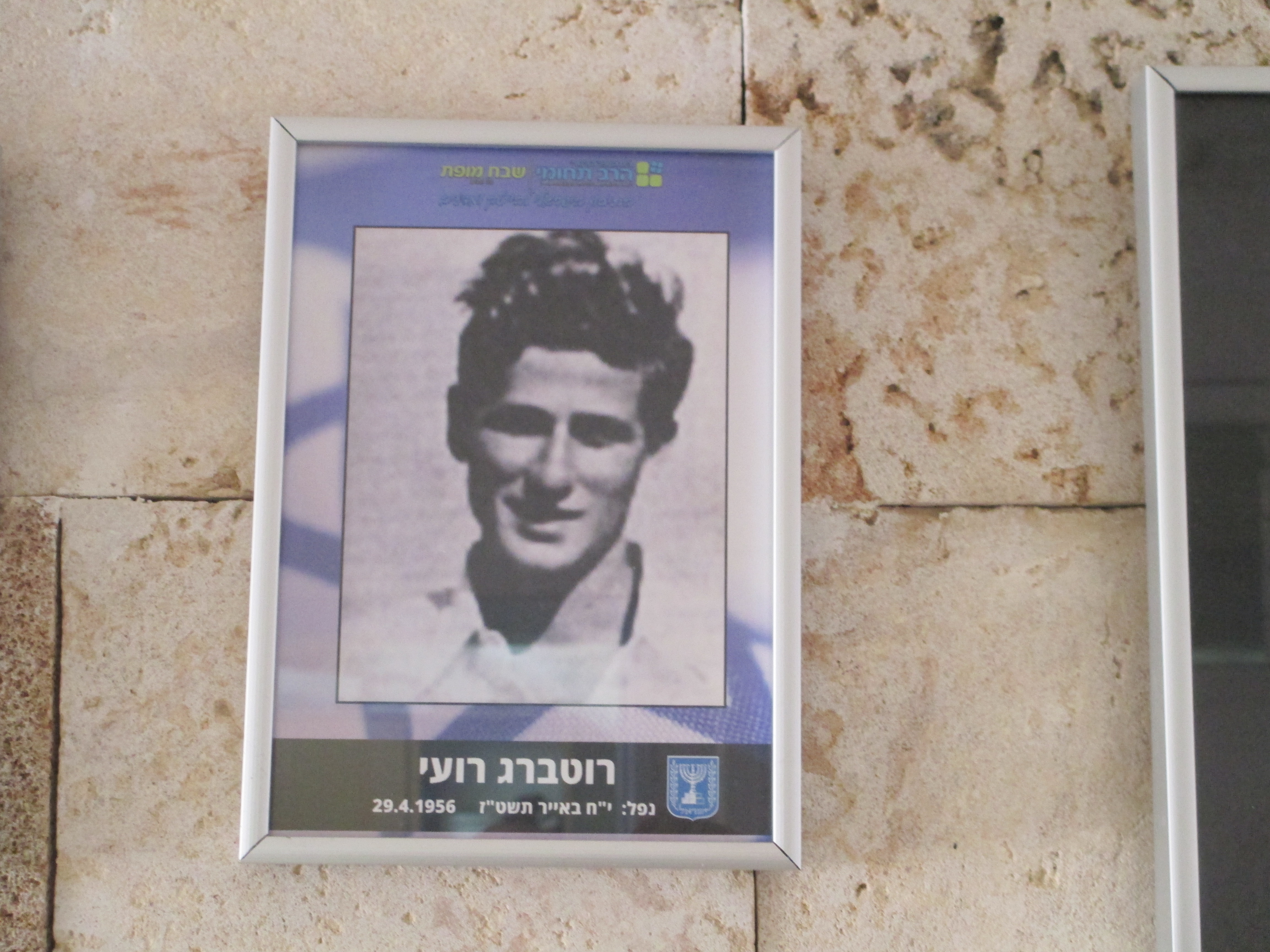
Portrait of Ro'i Rothberg at his alma mater, the Shevah Mofet school.

Ro'i Rothberg, sometimes spelled Roi Rotberg, was born in Tel Aviv in 1935. He served as a messenger boy for the Israel Defense Forces (IDF) during the 1948 Arab-Israeli War. After studying at the Mikveh Israel agricultural school and the Shevah Mofet vocational school, he enlisted in the IDF and joined the infantry. After completing an officer's course, he settled in Nahal Oz, which was to be the first of the Nahal settlements. He became the Nahal Oz security officer, and was regularly involved in chasing off infiltrators, sometimes using lethal force. Rothberg married Amira Glickson and had a son, Boaz, who was an infant at the time of his death.

=== Incident ===
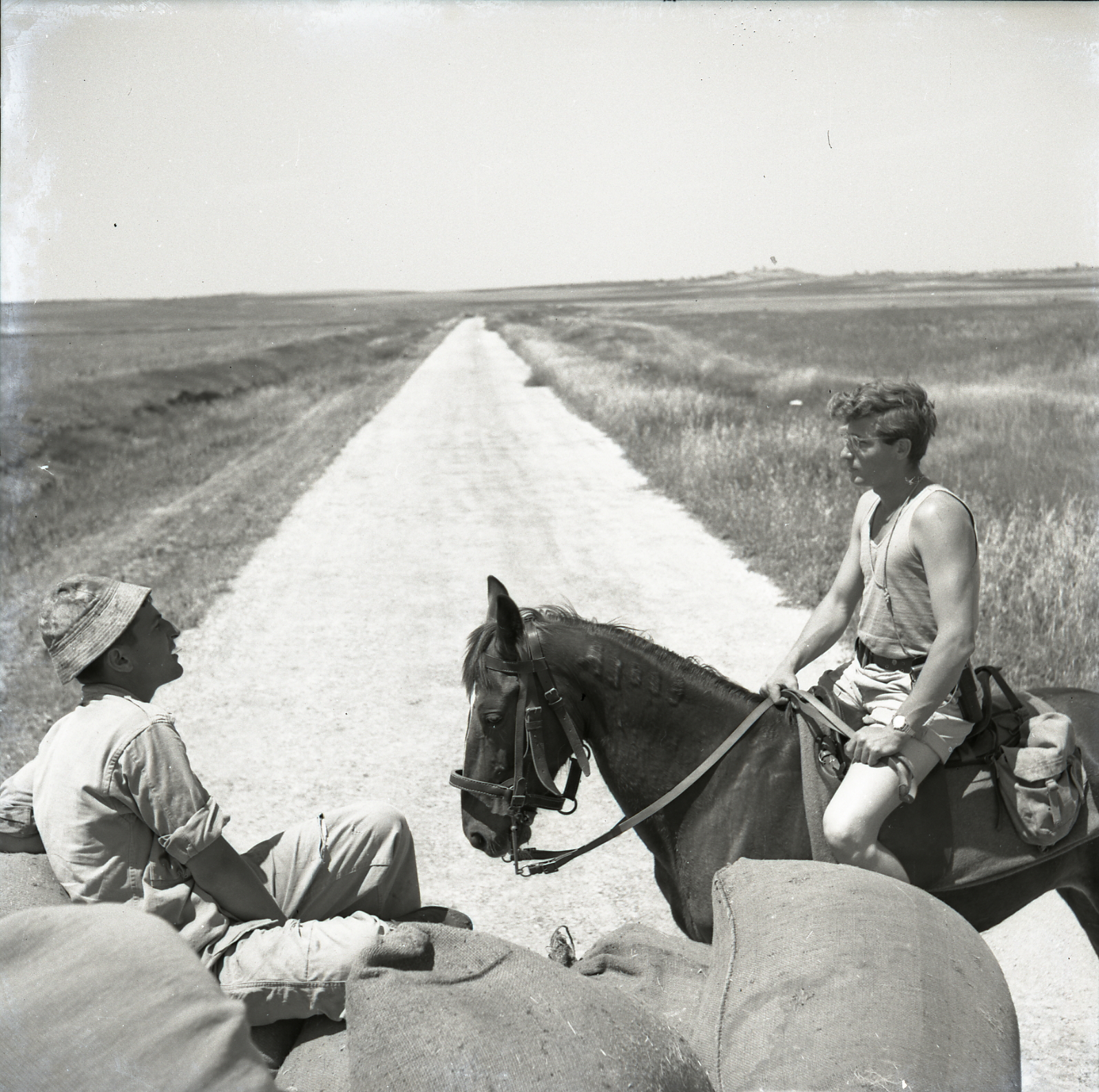
Rothberg mounted on a horse at Nahal Oz, early 1950s, photographed by Boris Carmi.

On 29 April 1956 he was caught in a prepared ambush; Arab harvest workers began to reap wheat in the kibbutz's fields. Rothberg saw them and rode toward them to chase them off. As he approached, others emerged from hiding to attack. He was shot off his horse, beaten and shot again, then his body was dragged into Gaza. Rothberg's attackers included an Egyptian policeman and a Palestinian farmer. Badly mutilated, his body was returned on the same day after United Nations intervention.

== Eulogy ==
According to Jean-Pierre Filiu, following the killing, emotions in Israel "ran high", leading Dayan to travel to the kibbutz to give the funeral oration.

Yesterday morning Ro’i was murdered. Dazzled by the calm of the morning, he did not see those waiting in ambush for him at the edge of the furrow. Let us not cast accusations at the murderers today. Why should we blame them for their burning hatred for us? For eight years they have been dwelling in Gaza’s refugee camps, as before their eyes we have transformed the land and the villages in which they and their forefathers had dwelled into our own property.

We should not seek Roi’s blood from the Arabs in Gaza but from ourselves. How have we shut our eyes and not faced up forthrightly to our fate, not faced up to our generation’s mission in all its cruelty? Have we forgotten that this group of lads, who dwell in Nahal Oz, is carrying on its shoulders the heavy gates of Gaza, (Note: The metaphor "carrying... gates of Gaza" refers to Samson, biblical character, an Israelite who carried away the gates of Philistine Gaza, see Judges 16:1–3.) on whose other side crowd hundreds of thousands of eyes and hands praying for our moment of weakness, so that they can tear us apart – have we forgotten that?… We are the generation of settlement; without a steel helmet and the muzzle of the cannon we will not be able to plant a tree and build a home. Our children will not have a life if we do not dig shelters, and without barbed wire and machine guns we will not be able to pave roads and dig water wells. Millions of Jews who were exterminated because they had no land are looking at us from the ashes of Israeli history and ordering us to settle and resurrect a land for our people. But beyond the border’s furrow an ocean of hatred and an urge for vengeance rises, waiting for the moment that calm will blunt our readiness, for the day that we heed the ambassadors of conspiring hypocrisy, who call upon us to put down our arms.

Let us not flinch from seeing the loathing that accompanies and fills the lives of hundreds of thousands of Arabs who dwell around us and await the moment they can reach for our blood. Let us not avert our eyes lest our hands grow weak. This is the destiny of our generation. This is the choice of our lives – to be ready and armed and strong and tough. For if the sword falls from our fist, our lives will be cut down.

The following day, Dayan recorded his speech for Israeli radio, in a version that omitted any reference to Palestinian refugees looking on as Jews cultivate the lands they had been evicted from, and suppressing his remark that they should not be blamed for hating the people who dispossessed them.

== See also ==
- Israeli-Palestinian conflict
