= Fence for Life =

Israeli political movement

In June 2001 a non-partisan public and civilian Israeli movement called Fence for life (Hebrew: גדר לחיים) began a struggle for the construction of a continuous security fence between the Palestinian population centers and the Israeli population. The movement was founded by people from all over Israel following the Dolphinarium terror attack.

The goal of the movement is to encourage the government to construct a security fence along Israel's borders. "Fence for Life" urged the government to build a continuous fence as speedily as possible (without any consideration of the political future of the areas separated by it) with the goal of sealing off the Palestinian territories from Israeli population centers, in order to prevent terrorist acts by Palestinians against people living in Israel.

From the very beginning of its public campaign "Fence for Life" emphasized that the construction of a security fence should have no connection whatsoever with the political future of the settlements. Its tactics have included protests, demonstrations, conferences with public figures, media blitzes, lobbying in the Knesset, and legal battles in the High Court of Justice concerning demands for construction of a security fence without delay. The movement does not support any specific path for the barrier. "Fence for Life" stated the opinion that "politicization" of the fence by various groups was delaying the completion of the security barrier and was likely to block its construction. In December 2002, due to government inaction, Gilboa towns started to build the barrier directly on the Green Line using their own funds.

Eventually however, the grassroots efforts of organizations like Fence for Life together with other factors prompted the Israeli government to construct the West Bank barrier.
