= Capture of Matan Angrest =

Israeli soldier

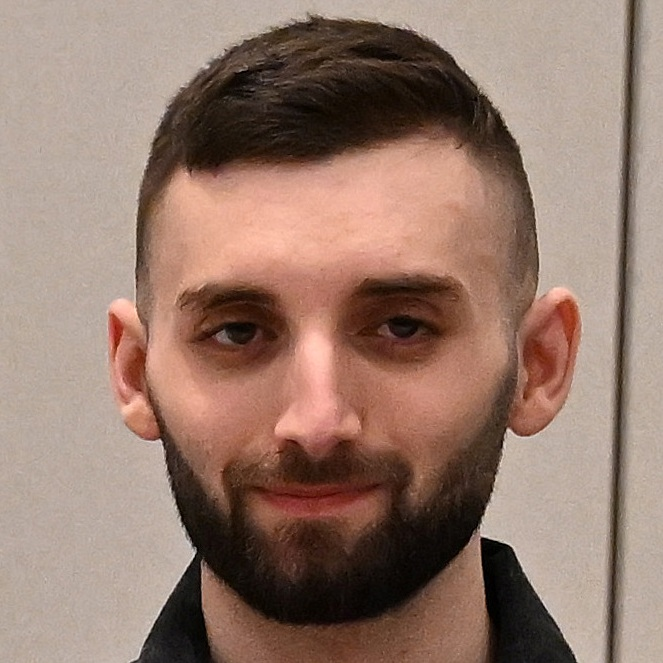
- Angrest a week after his release from captivity by Hamas
- Born: 28 November 2002 (age 23)
- Military career
- Branch: Israel Defense Forces
- Known for: the Gaza war hostage crisis

Matan Shahar Angrest (Hebrew: מתן שחר אנגרסט; born 28 November 2002) is an Israeli soldier who was abducted in the Hamas-led attack on Nahal Oz on 7 October 2023. Serving as a tank driver in the Israel Defense Forces (IDF), he was taken hostage during the events of the October 7 attacks and was subsequently released from captivity on 13 October 2025.

== Early life ==
Angrest was born on 28 November 2002 to Anat and Haggai and has three younger siblings. He grew up in Kiryat Bialik and enlisted in the IDF in August 2021, serving as a tank driver in the Armored Corps.

== Abduction ==
On 7 October 2023, during the Hamas attack on southern Israel, Angrest and his tank crew, commanded by Captain Daniel Peretz, were deployed to the Nahal Oz sector to defend communities surrounding Gaza. During the broader assault, the Nahal Oz base itself, located just 850 meters from the Gaza border, was overrun by a large Hamas force that breached the perimeter, killed numerous soldiers, and abducted others as the position rapidly collapsed.

Angrest served as the driver of Peretz's tank, and besides them the crew included sergeant first class Itay Chen (gunner) and sergeant Tomer Leibowitz (loader). After the start of the Hamas attack, the tank fought militants near the border barrier for an hour, before being hit and disabled just outside the Nahal Oz outpost. Peretz, Chen and Leibowitz were killed, and Angrest was wounded and captured; the bodies of Peretz and Chen were also taken to Gaza (they would be returned after more than two years as part of the October 2025 Hamas–Israel agreement). On 3 April 2025, video footage of Angrest's abduction was released, showing him being dragged from his tank and lynched. Additional footage showed him injured, bruised, and interrogated.

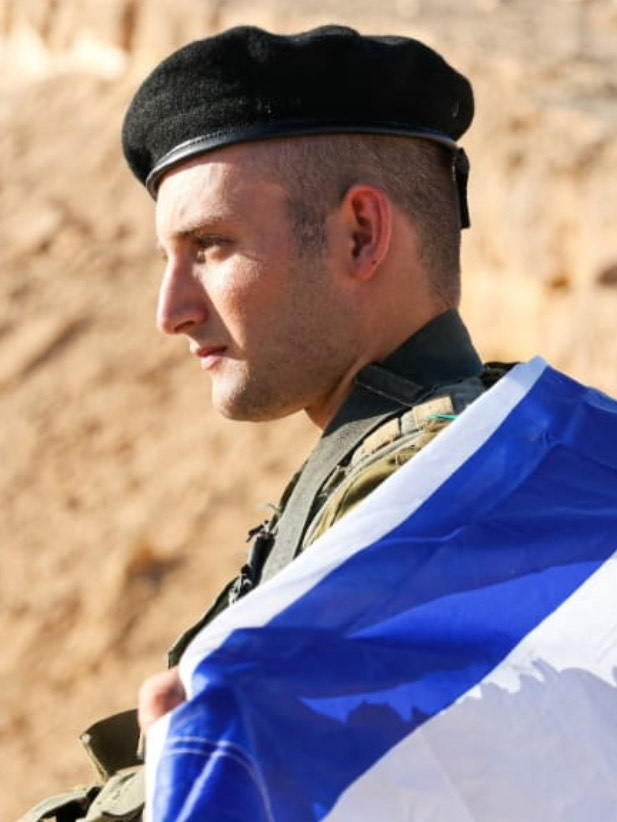
Angrest in 2021 at a ceremony in which he was awarded his military beret

== Captivity ==
Testimony from fellow hostages indicated that Angrest was held in underground tunnels and subjected to repeated physical abuse and harsh interrogations. During an episode of the investigative program Uvda, IDF observers abducted from the Nahal Oz outpost who were held with him in a tunnel described severe abuse. Daniella Gilboa recounted that Angrest entered a section of the tunnel he was not supposed to; when Hamas operatives discovered this, they beat him and “showed him no mercy.” Karina Ariev stated, “They beat him until he understood and stopped going to that area. Liri Albag added: “They punish, they abuse. Even when it isn’t physical, and sometimes it is, it’s psychological. ‘You will not return,’ ‘Like Gilad Shalit.’”

Statements provided to his family described additional mistreatment, including episodes in which he was reportedly brought close to suffocation and allowed to surface briefly to breathe just before losing consciousness.

On 25 April, former hostage Roni Krivoi, abducted on October 7 and released in the November 2023 exchange, reported that he had been held in the same tunnel as Angrest and that captors connected Angrest to a car battery and electrocuted him.

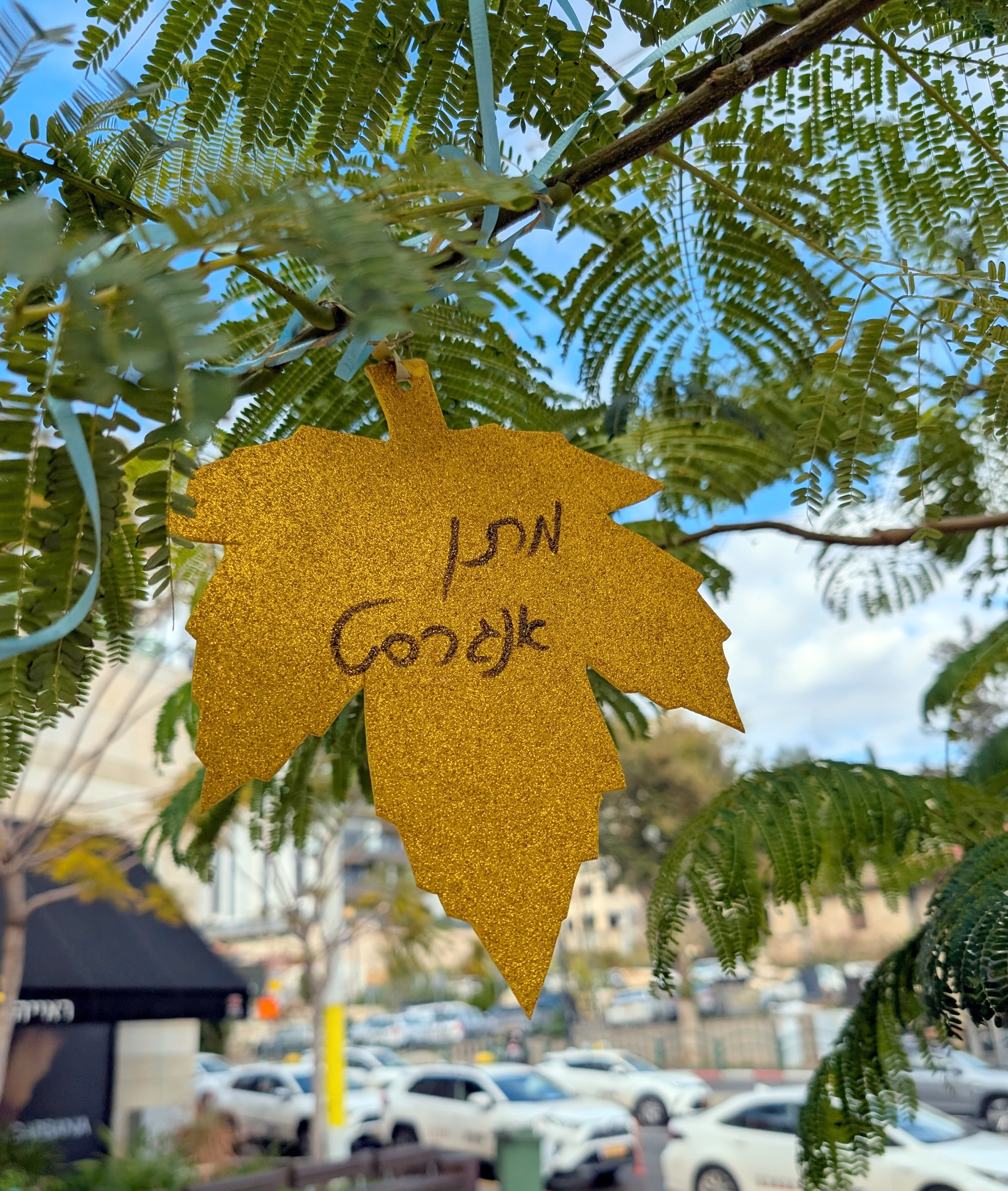
A leaf bearing the name of Matan Angrest in the “Yellow Leaves” installation for the return of the hostages, located in Hostages Square near the mall in the city of Rehovot, January 2025, during the Iron Swords War.

Despite these conditions, Angrest maintained a prayer routine after his captors granted his request for tefillin, a prayer book, and a Bible.

In a February 2026 interview on Channel 12's Uvda program, Angrest described being tortured by electrocution during interrogations in captivity, stating that captors applied electric wires to his wounds, causing severe pain. He also recounted being held alone initially before bonding with fellow hostage Gali Berman, and provided further details on the October 7 attack and his crew's fate.

=== Efforts to secure his release ===
In April 2025, following release of video footage showing Matan being lynched at the time of his abduction, the Angrest family released a statement condemning the abuse and calling for a cease-fire, stating "we are not asking for any revenge, revenge is not the way to get Matan back. We demand that the State of Israel immediately go to the media and declare that we are ready to stop the fighting in order to return all 59 kidnapped people, stop our nightmare and that of all the families now."

In the aforementioned Uvda episode featuring the abducted observers, Angrest’s parents also appeared and spoke with them. On 21 April 2025, members of his family joined a demonstration outside the Begin Gate of the Kirya in Tel Aviv, wearing green clothing and makeup resembling blood, stating: “This is a reminder of the lynching Matan experienced.”

== Release ==
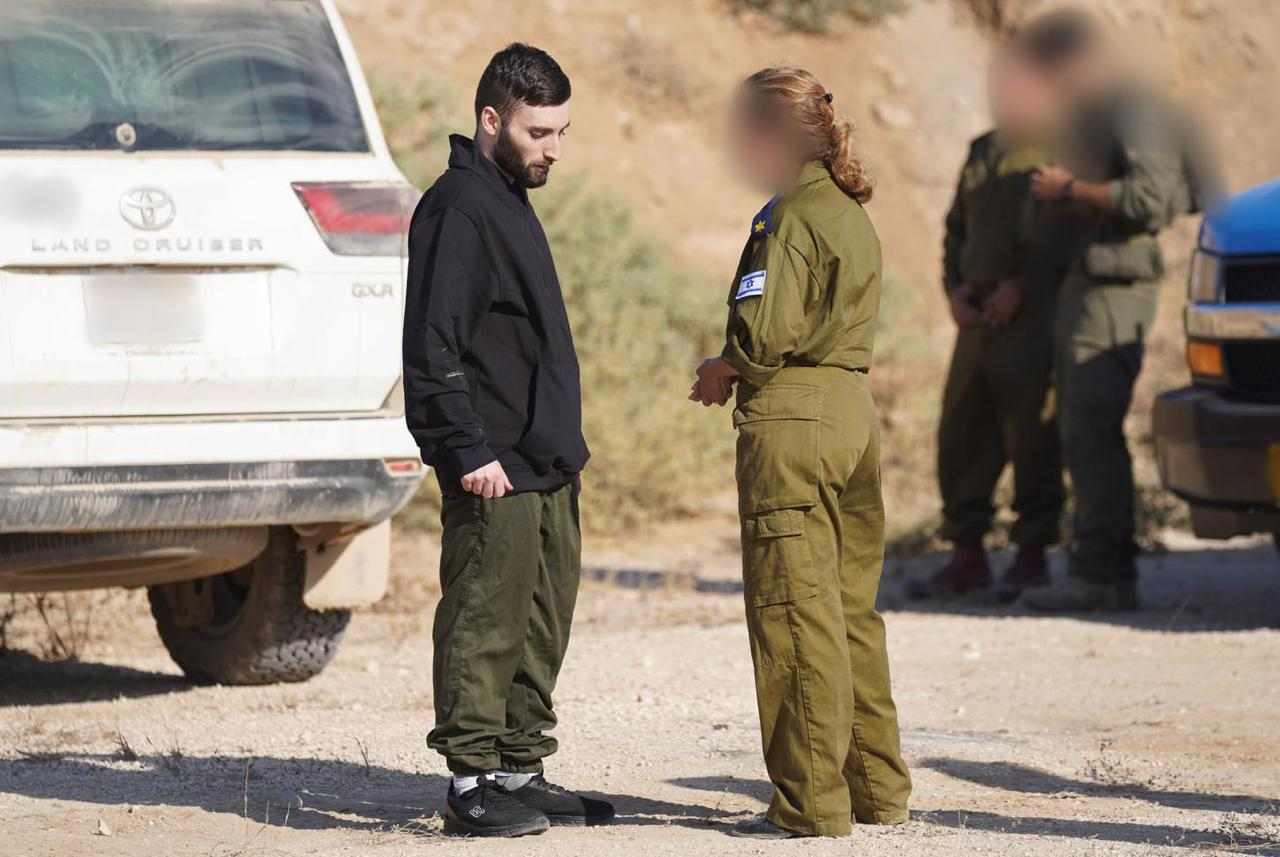
Matan Angrest immediately after being released on October 13, 2025.

Angrest was released on 13 October 2025 as part of a negotiated agreement between Israel and Hamas, along with 19 other hostages. Upon his return, his family reported that he bore signs of torture, including burn marks, though he was in generally stable medical condition.

== See also ==
- List of Gaza war hostages
- Gali Berman
