= Shevah Mofet =

School in Tel Aviv, Israel

Coordinates: 32°03′38.9″N 34°47′02.5″E

- Hebrew: שבח מופת; Russian: Шевах-Мофет
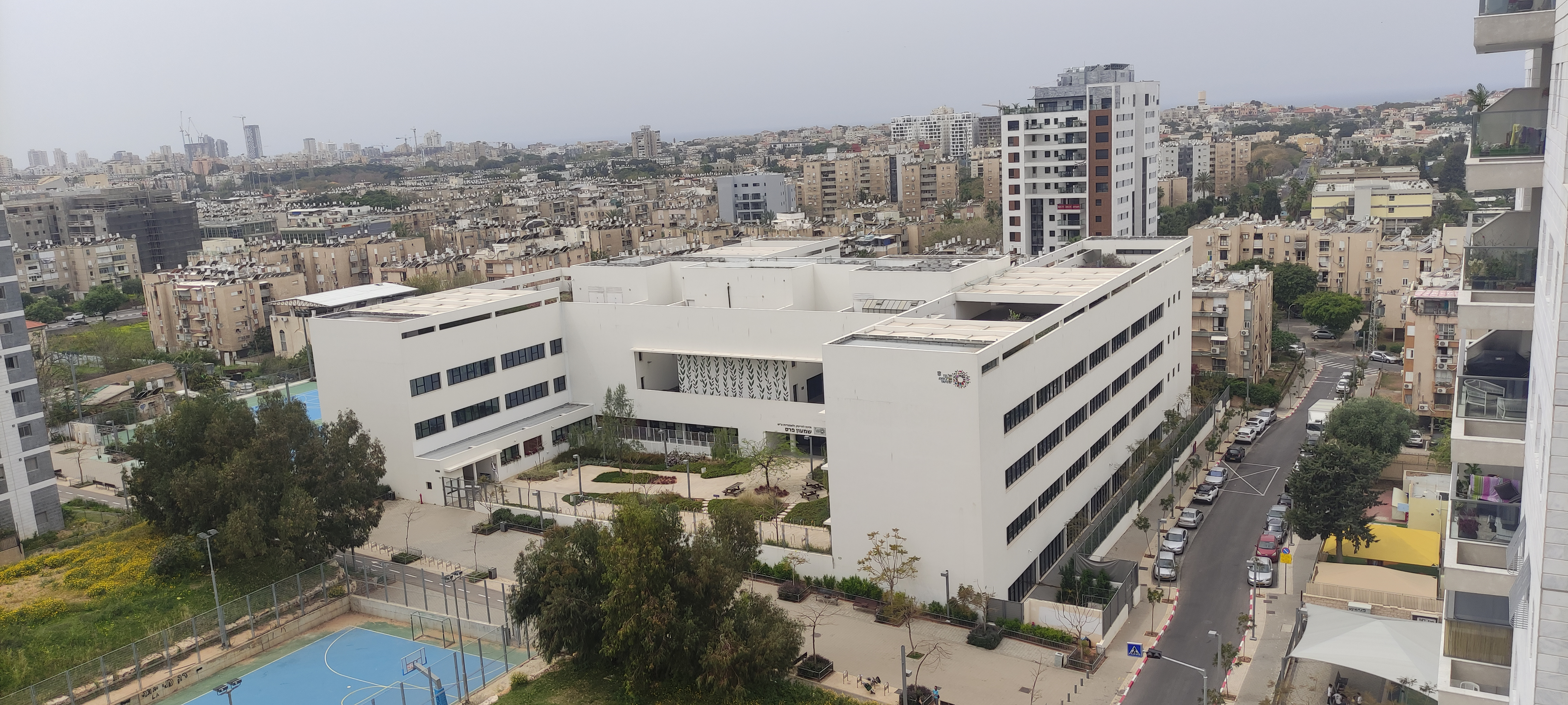

Information
- Established: 1942; 83 years ago
- Website: shevach-moffet.com

Shevah Mofet (Hebrew: שבח מופת; Russian: Шевах-Мофет), also transliterated Shevach Moffet, is a junior and high school on HaMasger Street in Tel Aviv, Israel. It was established in 1942 as a vocational school. Since the 1990s, new programs were inaugurated to meet the needs of the Russian immigrant population in Israel.

== History ==
=== 20th century ===
The school was originally called Shevah, named after a British World War II pilot, who was the uncle of one of the founders of the school. Founded in 1942, it was the second Hebrew high school in Tel Aviv, after Gymnasia Herzliya. It was founded on the ruins of the Mount Hope farm, founded by Clorinda S. Minor and others. The buildings are designed by the architect Genia Averbuch.

Shevah was initially a vocational school teaching trades such as cabinet making, electricity, mechanics and sheet metal works. As the demand for such schools declined, it became an academic high school.

In the 1990s, with the onset of mass immigration from the former Soviet Union, Shevah introduced a new educational approach to help Russian youngsters from falling behind due to the language barrier. Intensive Hebrew language classes were organized based on proficiency in Hebrew rather than age, and a program for parents was developed that included Hebrew language studies, Jewish history, and culture.

In the 1990s, Yakov Mazganov, a Russian professor employed as a security guard at the school, founded Mofet, a night school for Russian immigrants that operated in the Shevah building after school hours. In turn, this attracted more Russian Ph.D.s and former professors to teach, as they couldn't find a job anywhere else, due to their lack of Hebrew knowledge. Eventually, a decision was made to merge Shevah and Mofet and the Russian teachers started teaching in the regular school, which became known as Shevah-Mofet. While classes at the night school often went on in Russian, all classes in the day school were taught exclusively in Hebrew. Mofet is an acronym containing the words Mathematics and Physics, but also means excellence.

This gave the school a reputation of being one of the best, but also discouraged attendance from many non-Russian students, who did not want to be part of a Russian-speaking high school in Hebrew-speaking Israel. The school was nicknamed 'Little Russia' by many.

In 1995, the southern Tel Aviv school's team made a sensation by winning first place on the team competition in Mathematics, hosted by Technion. Later, a Shevah student won a silver medal at an international junior software engineering olympics in Zagreb, Croatia on August 21, 2007, several students won medals on the International Mathematical Olympiad including the gold medal by Lev Buhovsky in 1996 and several silver and bronze medals on the Asian and the International Physics Olympiads.

Shevah Mofet has attracted many Russian visitors, notable figures such as Sergei Brin, one of the creators of Google, and Mikhail Gorbachev, the former Soviet president.

=== 21st century ===
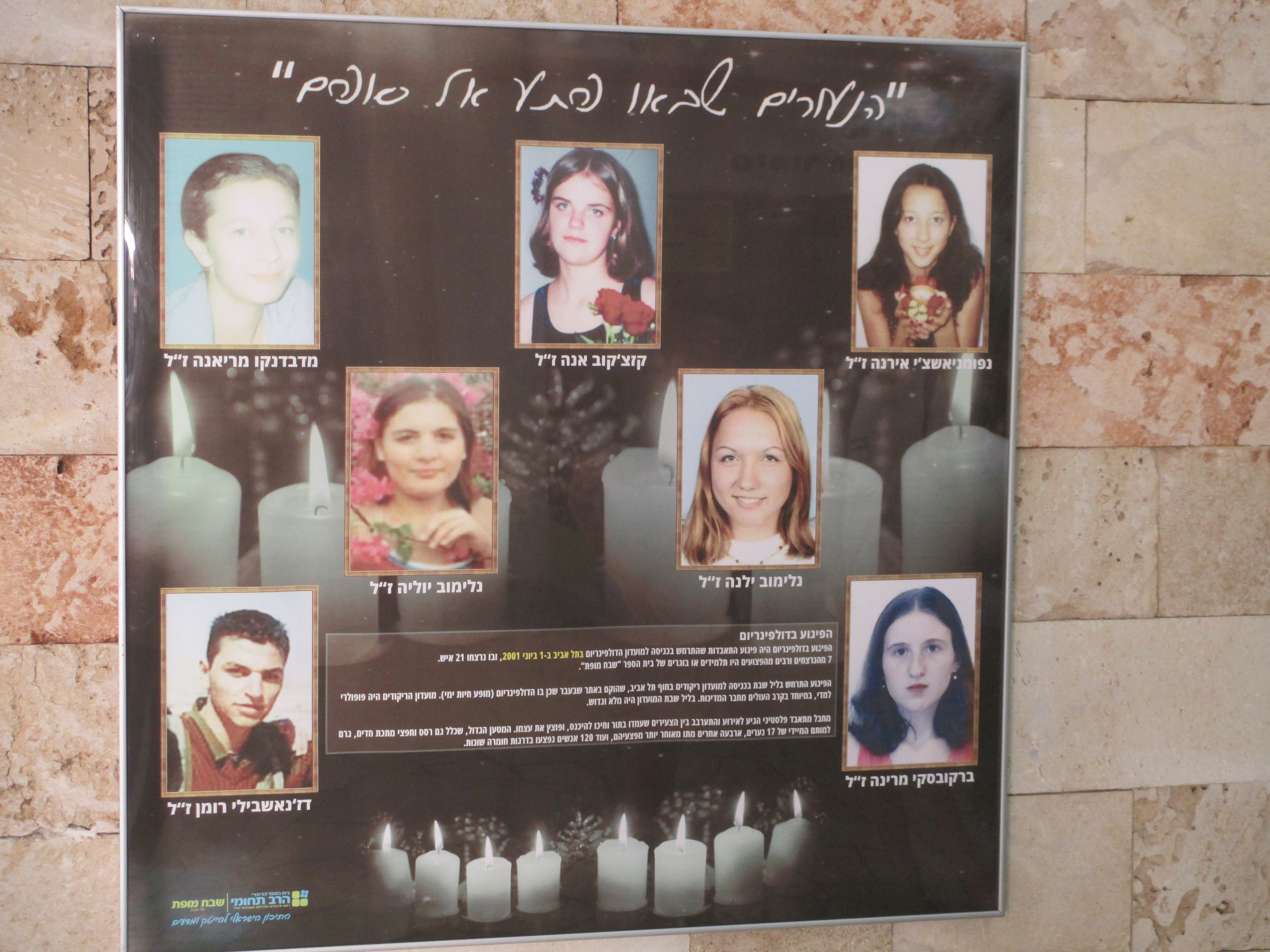
Dolphinarium massacre memorial in Shevach Mofet school

On June 1, 2001, an Arab suicide bomber killed 21 Israeli teenagers in the Dolphinarium discotheque massacre. Seven of the victims were from the Shevah Mofet high school, with more injured. The bombing created an international outrage, but also caused many Jewish communities worldwide to donate money to Shevah Mofet. This helped improve the financial situation of the school and create a new library and cafeteria.

In November 2002, it was discovered that the school cafeteria served expired, or otherwise bad food products. It created a citywide scandal, where the media (newspapers such as Yedioth Ahronoth and Maariv) were involved, as well as the health ministry. Despite this, the cafeteria was still operating and employing the same workers in a repeat check-up in August 2003.

== Organization ==
For many years, Shevah Mofet was a six-year school organized into a junior-high school (grades 7–9), and a secondary school (grades 10–12). In 2007–08 however, a new organization was introduced, and the school was split into three, two-grade sub-sections.

The secondary school has five departments, each focusing on a specific subject. In order of introduction, they are computers, business administration, robotics, electronics, and Biotechnology. Each department has one class, for a total of five classes per year.

== Notable alumni ==
- Artem Dolgopyat (born 1997), Israeli artistic gymnast (2020 Summer Olympics gold medalist)

== See also ==
- Education in Israel
