= 2014 Nahal Oz attack =

Military operation during 2014 Gaza War

2014 Nahal Oz military base raid
- Part of the 2014 Gaza War
Date	28 July 2014
Location	Nahal Oz military base, near Kibbutz Nahal Oz in Israel
Result	Palestinian victory

Belligerents
Israel	Hamas

Units involved
(Israel) Israeli Defence Forces; Givati Brigade	Ezzedeen Al-Qassam Brigades

Casualties and losses
(Israel) 10 killed (Hamas claim) (Israel) 5 killed (IDF claim)	None (Hamas claim); 1 Killed (IDF claim)
- No non-combatant casualties

The 2014 Nahal Oz military base raid took place in Nahal Oz military base near Kibbutz Nachal Oz on 28 July 2014. Israeli forces were attacked by fighters from the tunnel unit of the Ezzedeen Al-Qassam Brigades.

The militants from the Palestinian group Hamas used a tunnel that had been dug from the Gaza Strip into Israeli territory to infiltrate the kibbutz. They emerged from the tunnel and engaged in a firefight with Israeli soldiers in the military outpost. During the attack, five Israeli soldiers were killed.

== The raid ==
A group of Palestinian militants emerged from a tunnel near the Nahal Oz military outpost in Nahal Oz then moved along the long grass covering them being spotted by Israeli forces. After making sure there were no Israeli vehicles or tanks in patrol near the operation, the commander lead the unit forward, running alongside the high ground on the roadside to gain advantage from the cover and to stay hidden because if he ran in the open ground he can be easily spotted from the shade and silhouette from running under the sunlight. The fighters also maintained distance between each other, avoiding being gathered in one place in case they were spotted and fired on by drones or artillery.

The militants then evacuated the area back to the tunnel with a captured Tavor X95. Al-Qassam declared that they killed 10 IDF soldiers at the pillbox outpost, while the Israelis claimed only 5 were killed. Hamas stated that it had suffered no casualties during the operation; the IDF said one Hamas militant was killed. The video was released to the public media as a proof of their success and to also display the captured Israeli firearm. Three years after the operation the IDF dismantled the outpost.
