= Nahal Oz Observers Memorial Monument =

Nahal Oz Observers Memorial
- אנדרטת התצפיתניות
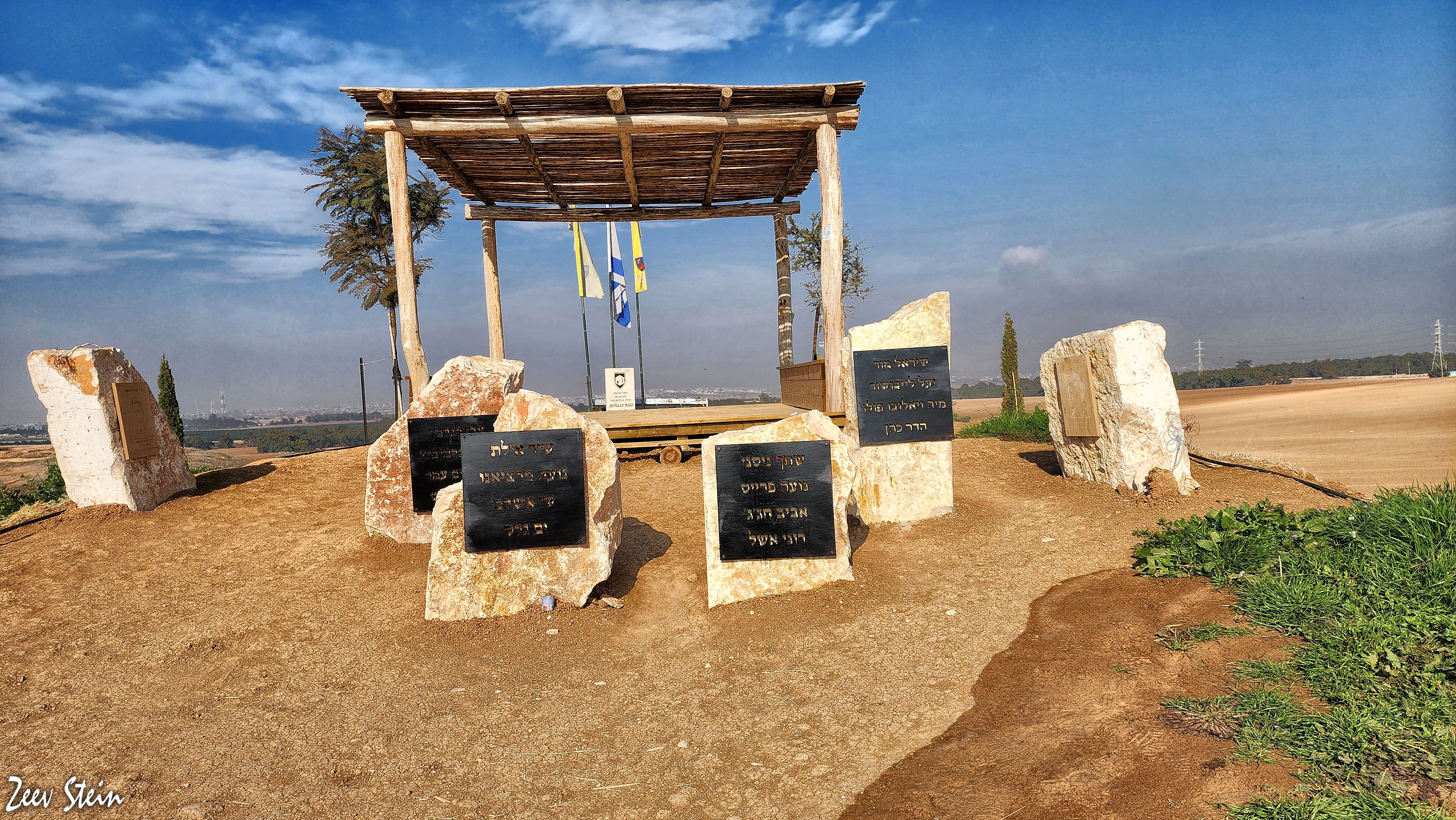
- Nahal Oz Observers Memorial
- Interactive map of Nahal Oz Observers Memorial
- Location: Israel
- Coordinates: 31°27′51″N 34°31′28″E
- Completion date: 2024
- Dedicated to: Observer soldiers who fell in the Battle of Nahal Oz during the October 7 attacks in 2023.

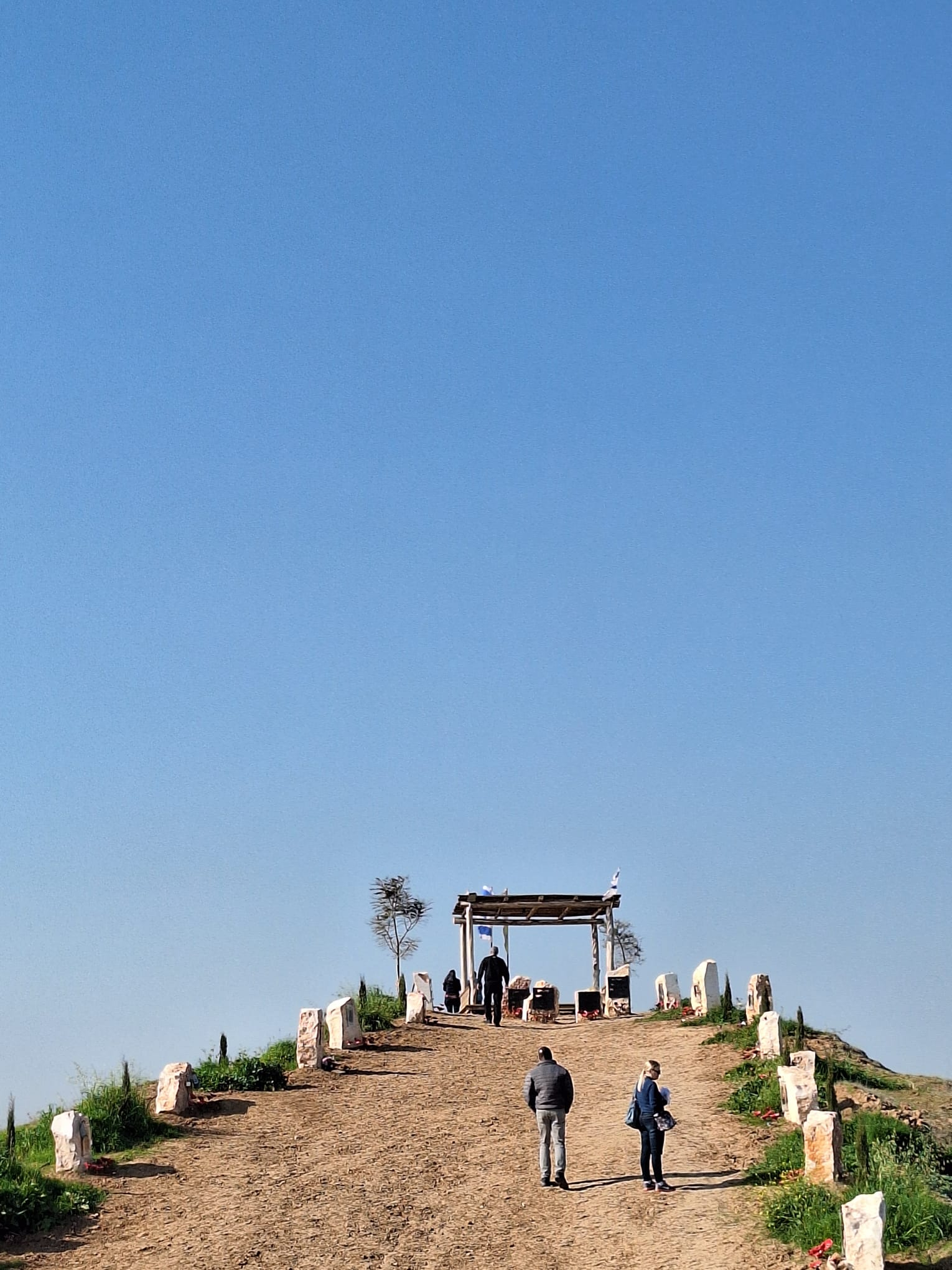
The Nahal Oz Observers Memorial Monument

The Nahal Oz Observers Memorial Monument (Hebrew: אנדרטת התצפיתניות) is a commemorative site dedicated to the female observer soldiers who were killed in the Battle of Nahal Oz during the October 7 attacks in 2023.

== Background ==
=== Field Observers ===
IDF field observers, primarily young soldiers in all-women teams, often aged 19 or 20 are stationed at observation posts along Israel's borders. These soldiers spend hours analyzing feeds from surveillance cameras, making essential real-time judgments that frequently dictate the security of their respective zones.

=== Hamas Attack of the Observers Post ===
During the Hamas attack on October 7, 2023, the observers post at the Nahal Oz army base was stormed by Hamas militants. 15 unarmed female IDF field observers were killed and 7 were kidnapped and taken to Gaza as hostages (of the latter, one was killed in captivity, one was rescued by the IDF and the remaining five were released after over 470 days in captivity during a ceasefire and hostage deal). Most of the soldiers were wearing sweatpants and the clothes they were sleeping in.

== The Monument ==
The monument is located between the Nahal Oz outpost and the settlements around Gaza, the cities of Sderot and Netivot, and is intended to illustrate the vital role of the female observers in protecting the borders of the State of Israel.

The monument was established at the initiative of the "Fields Instead of Fences" (שדות במקום גדרות) organization, the parents of the observers, and the Israel Defense Forces (IDF) in collaboration with volunteers, donors, and students from Sapir College in Sderot. The observatory is part of the "Road to Rebirth" trail - a heritage and commemoration project that allows the families of the fallen to commemorate their loved ones. The goal of the trail is to attract visitors to the area and connect the general public to the legacy of the Gaza war.

The site serves as historical testimony to the work of the female observers and their contribution to the security of the state, and emphasizes the importance of their role in Israel's defense.

The approach to the observation post is marked by memorial stones, each bearing a photograph of the female observer soldiers who were killed at the Nahal Oz outpost during the Hamas attack of October 7, 2023. These memorial stones are positioned on a hill within the site, providing a panoramic view of the surrounding area. This arrangement is designed to facilitate a personal connection between visitors and the individual stories of the fallen observers, commemorating their sacrifice in the defense of Israel.
