= Palm Beach Synagogue =

Religion
- Affiliation: Modern Orthodox Judaism
- Leadership: Moshe Scheiner
- Year consecrated: 1994
- Status: Active

Location
- Location: 120 N County Rd, Palm Beach, Florida, United States
- Interactive map of Palm Beach Synagogue
- Coordinates: 26.71924°N 80.03803°W

Architecture
- Architect: Arthur Chabon
- Type: Synagogue

Website
- www.palmbeachsynagogue.org

Palm Beach Synagogue is a synagogue founded in 1994 in Palm Beach, Florida by Rabbi Moshe and Dinie Scheiner. The building was among the 28 winners of the 2016 Faith & Form/IFRAA Religious Art and Architecture Award, which earned recognition for liturgical interior design by New York-based architect Arthur Chabon.
