= Dolphinarium discotheque bombing =

2001 nightclub bombing in Tel Aviv, Israel

Dolphinarium suicide bombing
- Part of the Second Intifada
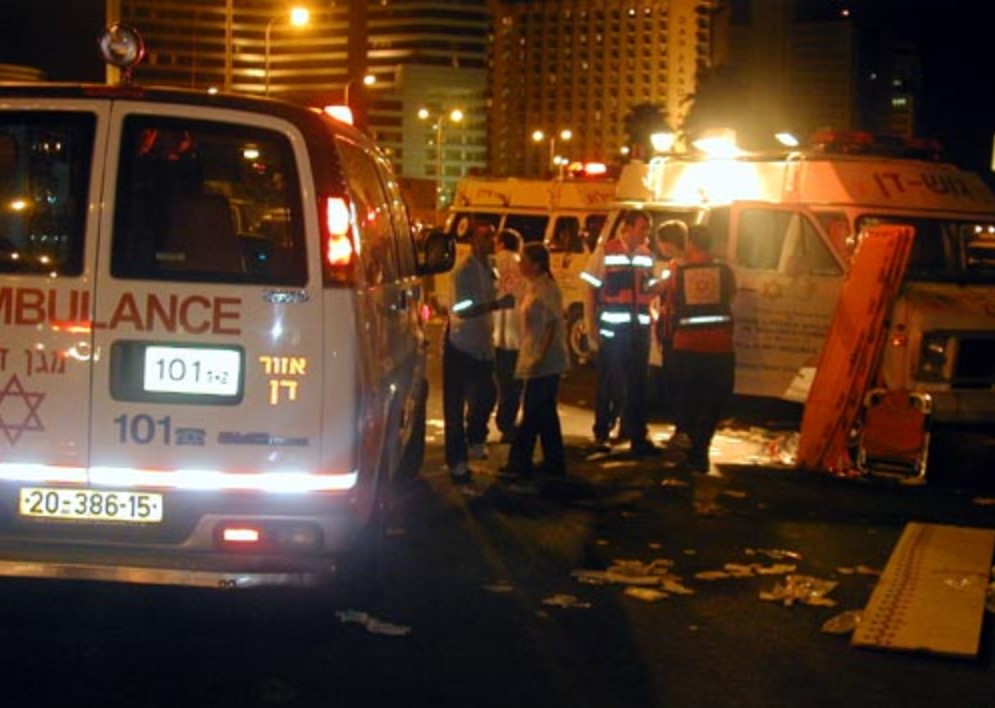
- The attack scene

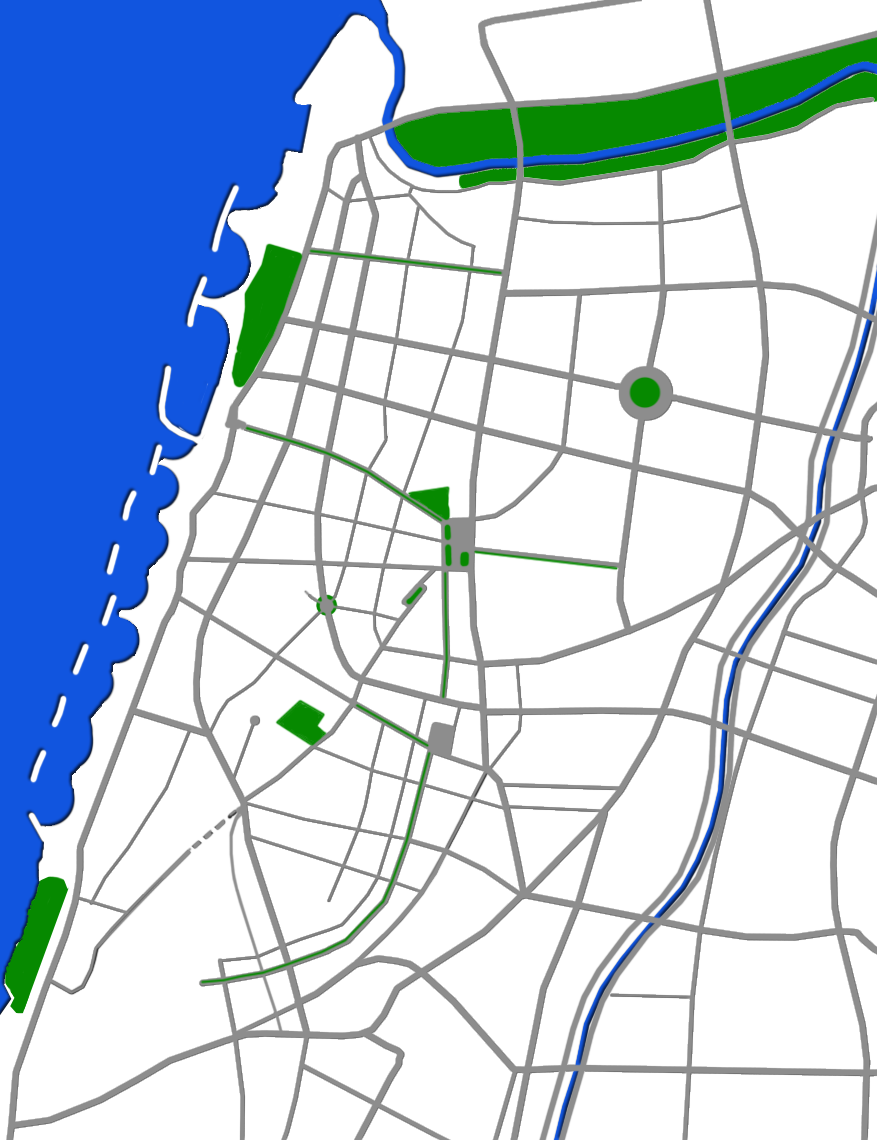
- Native name: הפיגוע בדולפינריום
- Location: 32°04′02″N 34°45′42″E; Tel Aviv, Israel
- Date: June 1, 2001; 25 years ago 23:27 pm (UTC+3)
- Attack type: Suicide bombing
- Weapon: 2.5 kilograms (5.5 lb) explosive device
- Deaths: 21 (+1 attacker)
- Injuries: 120
- Perpetrator: Hamas
- Assailant: Saeed Hotari

On 1 June 2001, Palestinian militant Saeed Hotari performed a suicide bombing outside the Dolphinarium discotheque on the beachfront in Tel Aviv, Israel, killing himself and 21 Israelis, 16 of whom were teenagers. The majority of the victims were Israeli teenage girls whose families had recently emigrated from the former Soviet Union. The death toll was the highest inflicted on Israel in five years.

== Attack ==
Suicide bomber Saeed Hotari was standing in line on a Friday night in front of the Dolphinarium, when the area was packed with teenagers. Most of the crowd were young people from Russian-speaking families from the former Soviet Union, who were waiting for admission to a dance party at the Dolphin disco, and others were in line to enter the adjacent nightclub. Survivors of the attack later described how the young Palestinian bomber appeared to taunt his victims before the explosion, wandering among them dressed in a disguise that led his victims to mistake him for an Orthodox Jew from Asia. Before detonating his bomb, he banged a drum packed with explosives and ball-bearings, while taunting his victims in Hebrew with the words "Something's going to happen". At 23:27, he detonated his explosive device. Witnesses claimed that body parts lay all over the area, and that bodies were piled one above another on the sidewalk before being collected. Many civilians in the vicinity of the bombing rushed to assist emergency services.

The suicide bombing followed a failed attack attempt on the same target five months earlier.

== Perpetrators ==
Both Islamic Jihad and a group calling itself "Hezbollah-Palestine" originally claimed responsibility for the suicide bombing, only to later retract the claims. Later on it was revealed that the attack was carried out by Saeed Hotari, aged 22, a militant allegedly linked to the Palestinian Islamist militant group Hamas.

== Official reactions ==
Israeli officials called the attack a "massacre". President of the Palestinian Authority Yasser Arafat condemned the attack and called for a cease-fire. UN Secretary-General Kofi Annan stated that he "[condemned] this indiscriminate terrorist attack in the strongest possible terms" and that the attack "[underlined] the urgency of breaking the cycle of violence." U.S. President George W. Bush condemned the attack "in the strongest terms" and said, "There is no justification for senseless attacks against innocent civilians."

== Aftermath ==
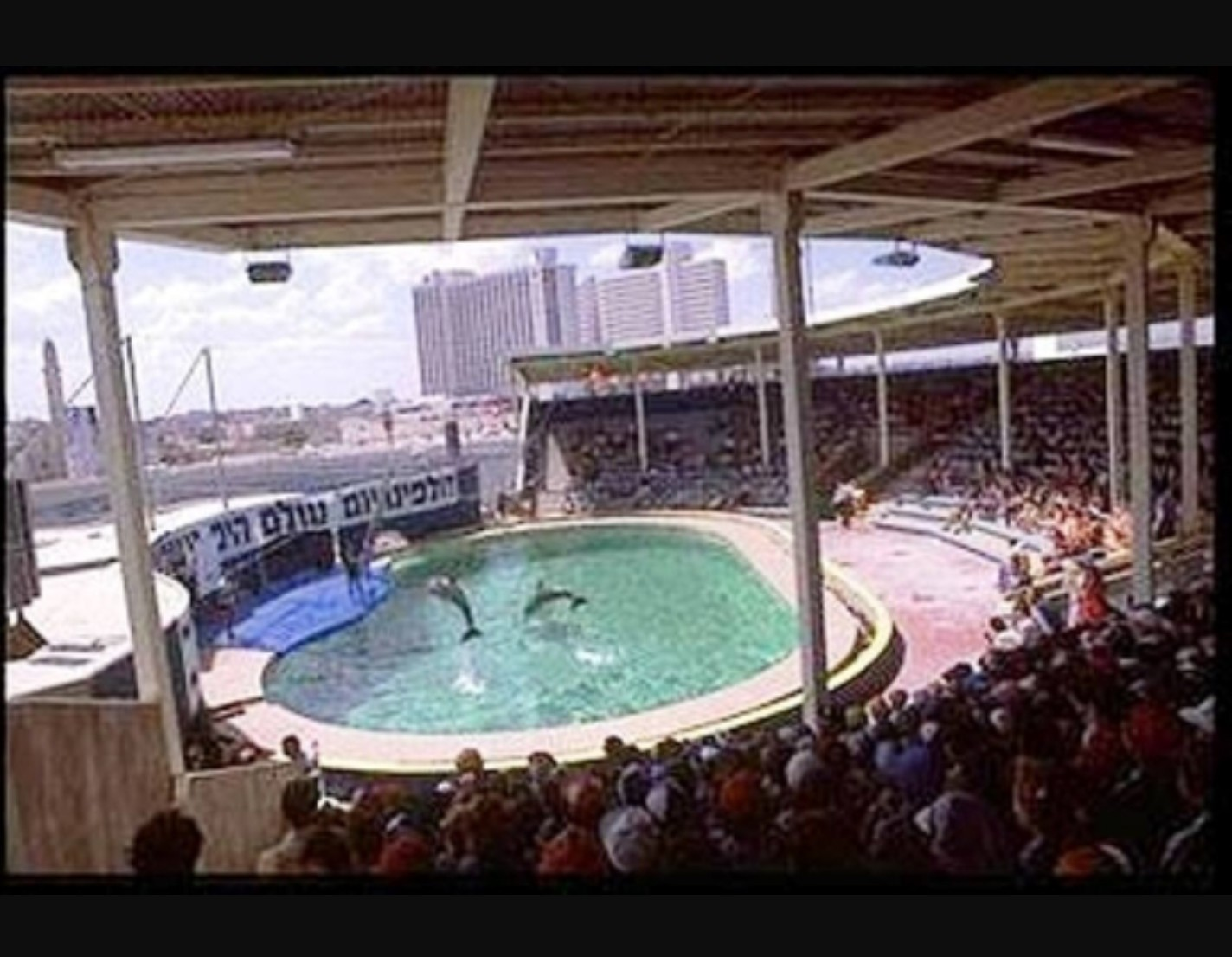
A dolphin show at the Dolphinarium in 1985

After the attack many in the Israeli public demanded a harsh military retaliation; nevertheless, Prime Minister Ariel Sharon decided to not take any immediate retaliatory actions. The U.S. and other governments applied heavy diplomatic pressure on Israel to refrain from action.

In Ramallah, dozens of Palestinians celebrated in the streets and fired in the air as a sign of celebration. The bomber, Saeed Hotari, was praised as a martyr by his father. U.S. President George W. Bush demanded that Yasser Arafat condemn the terrorist act, which he did. The next day, Israeli-Arabs barricaded themselves in the Hassan Bek Mosque opposite the Dolphinarium site and threw objects at the police.

According to the Intelligence and Terrorism Information Center, an Israeli-based organization with close ties to the IDF, among the materials seized by the IDF in the course of Operation Defensive Shield were two documents issued by the Martyrs' Families and Injured Care Establishment, which is under the authority of the Palestinian National Authority's Ministry of Social Affairs. The documents detail the transfer of US$2,000 to the father of the suicide bomber, who was living in Jordan at that time (18 June 2001). According to the Intelligence and Terrorism Information Center, the transfer was made despite the suicide bomber's Hamas affiliation, his father's public support of the attack, and Arafat's public condemnation of it.

== Memorial ==
After the bombing, the Dolphinarium discotheque was abandoned and ended up being covered with graffiti. Its final use was as a surfing school. The building remained on the Tel Aviv beachfront until its demolition in May 2018.

For many years, the victims' families campaigned to permanently preserve the ruined building as a monument to the attack. Eventually, the building was demolished in order to extend the promenade along the coast. Memorial services to the victims of the attack were held every year at the site by friends and family of the victims.

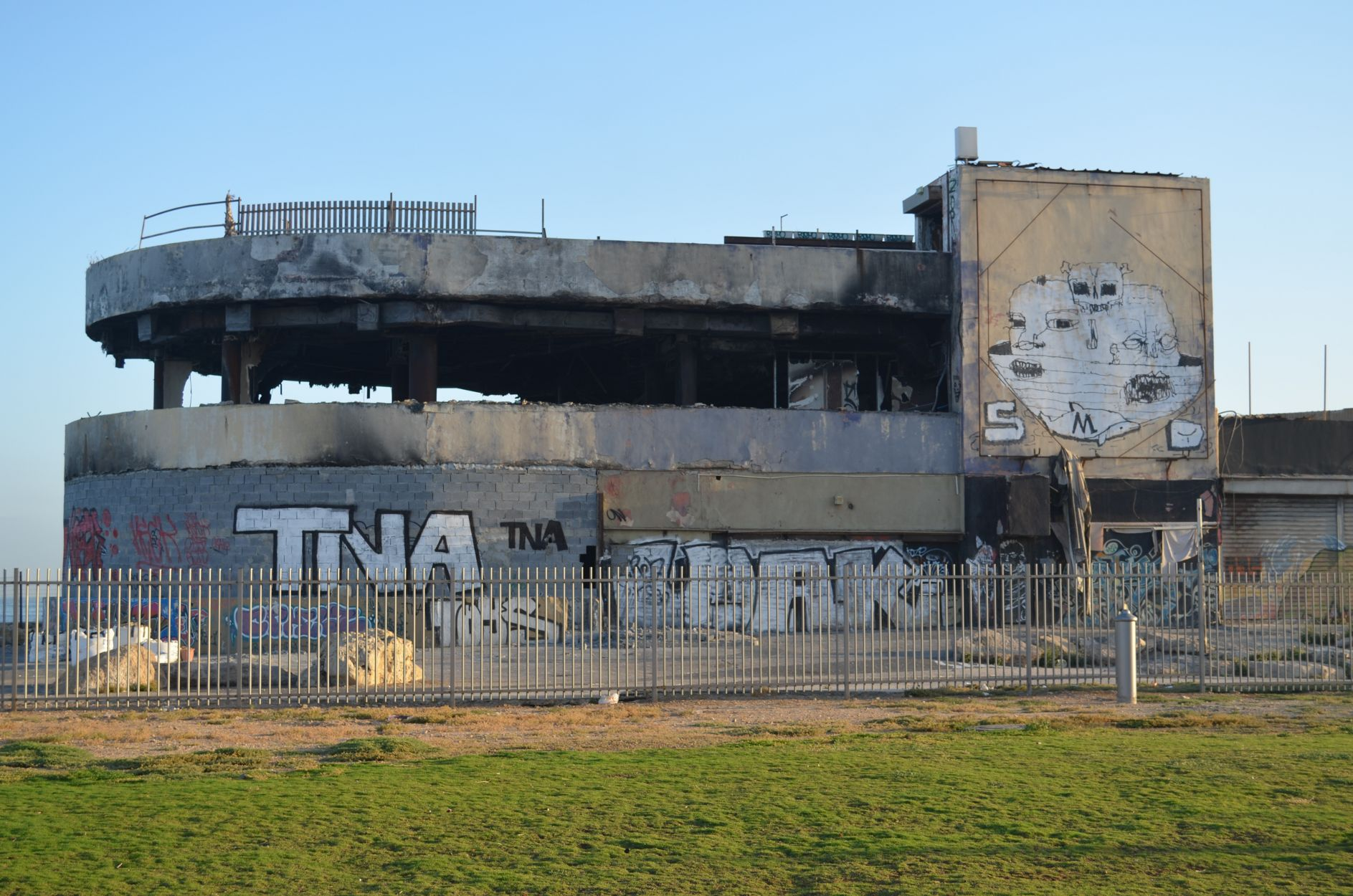
The ruins of the Dolphinarium in 2012; later demolished in 2018

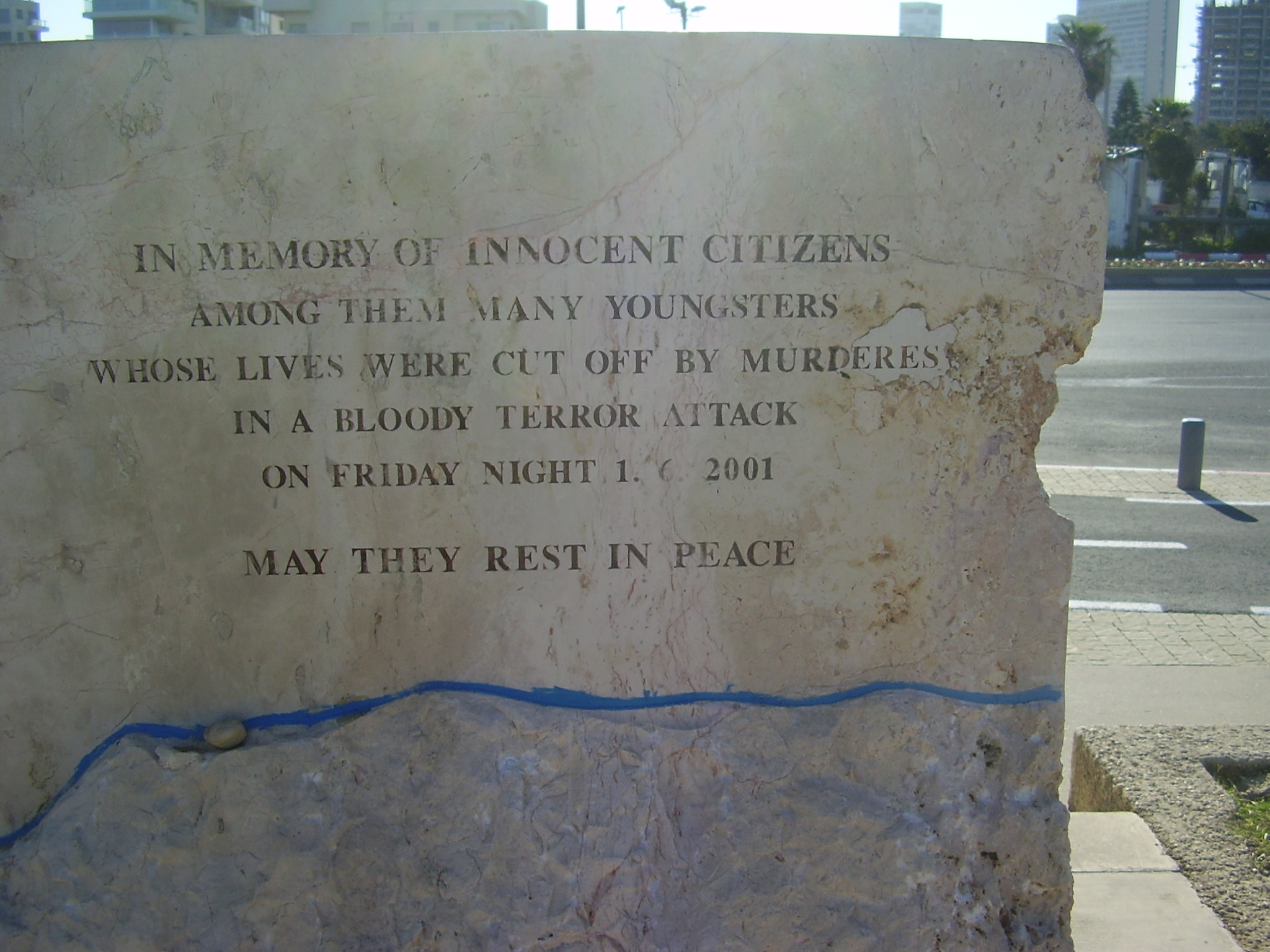
English inscription on the back of the Dolphinarium terror attack memorial

== See also ==
- Israeli casualties of war
- Palestinian political violence
- Palestinian suicide attacks
- Re'im music festival massacre
- Shevah Mofet – high school in Tel Aviv where seven of the killed teenagers and many of the injured studied
