= HaMasger Street =

Coordinates: 32°3′52.86″N 34°47′9.83″E

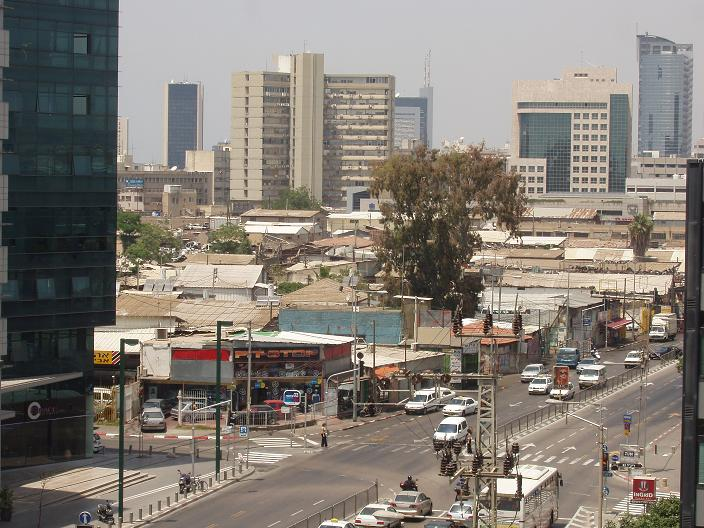
HaMasger Street

HaMasger Street (Hebrew: רחוב המסגר Translation: "The Metalsmith") is a street in Tel Aviv, Israel. It borders Montefiore Street on the west, and runs parallel to the Ayalon Freeway.

== History ==
Before the establishment of Tel Aviv, HaMasger was a dirt road. In the mid-19th century the area was known as Mount Hope. The road led through the fields north towards Montefiore orchard and Sarona, the Templer colony.

In the late 1970s, many of the garages and workshops that once lined the street closed down and were replaced by office buildings. Now the street houses car showrooms, vehicle importer offices, car rental companies and auto parts importers.
