= Combat Intelligence Collection Corps (Israel) =

- מערך האיסוף הקרבי
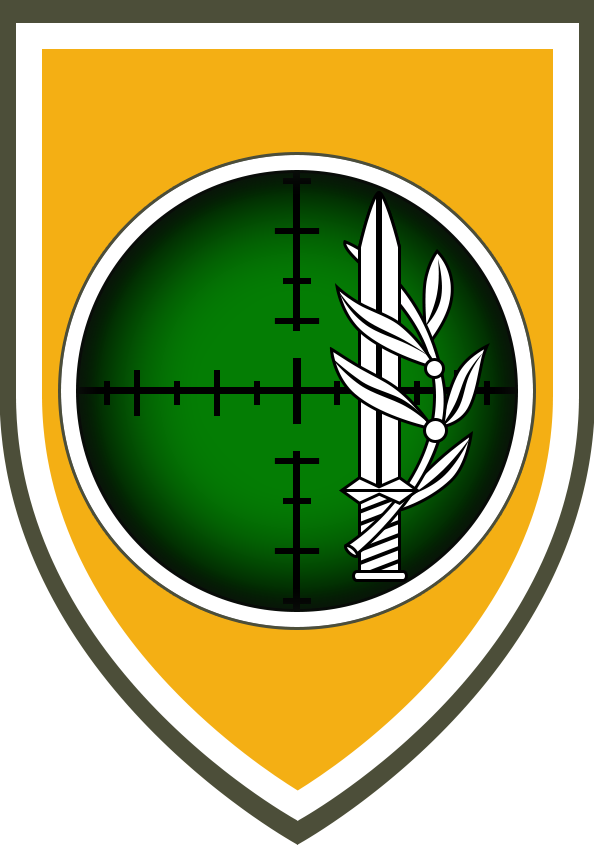
- Combat Intelligence Collection Corps insignia
- Active: 2000–present
- Country: Israel
- Branch: GOC Army Headquarters
- Type: Combat military intelligence unit
- Role: Intelligence assessment ISTAR; Military intelligence Patrolling
- Part of: Israel Defense Forces
- Motto: Hatzofeh Lifnei Hamahaneh ("The Scout Ahead of the Camp")
- Colors: Sand-colored Beret, Black Boots, White & Yellow Flag

Commanders
- Current commander: Brigadier General Amir Avstein

Insignia
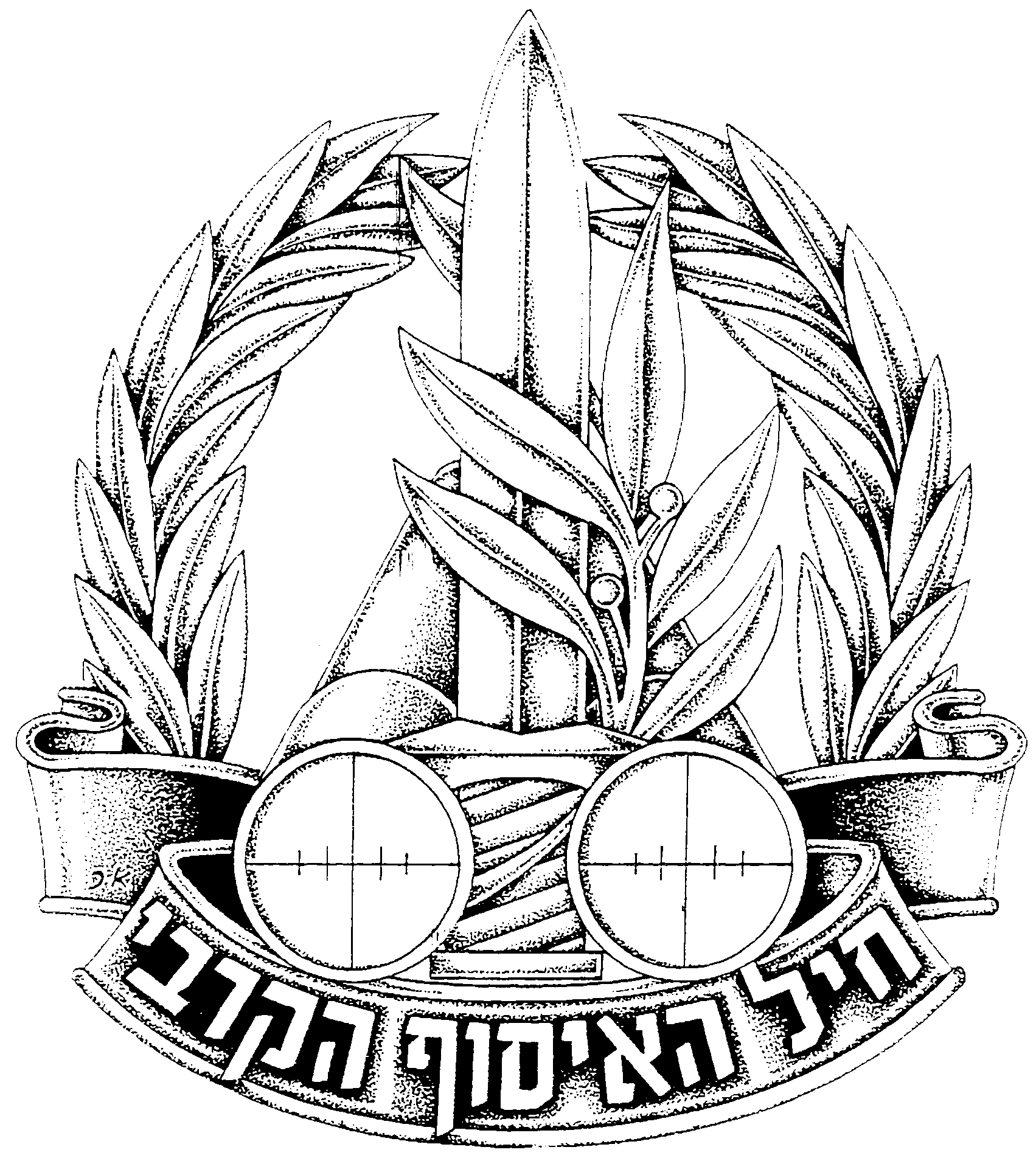
- Emblem

- Flag

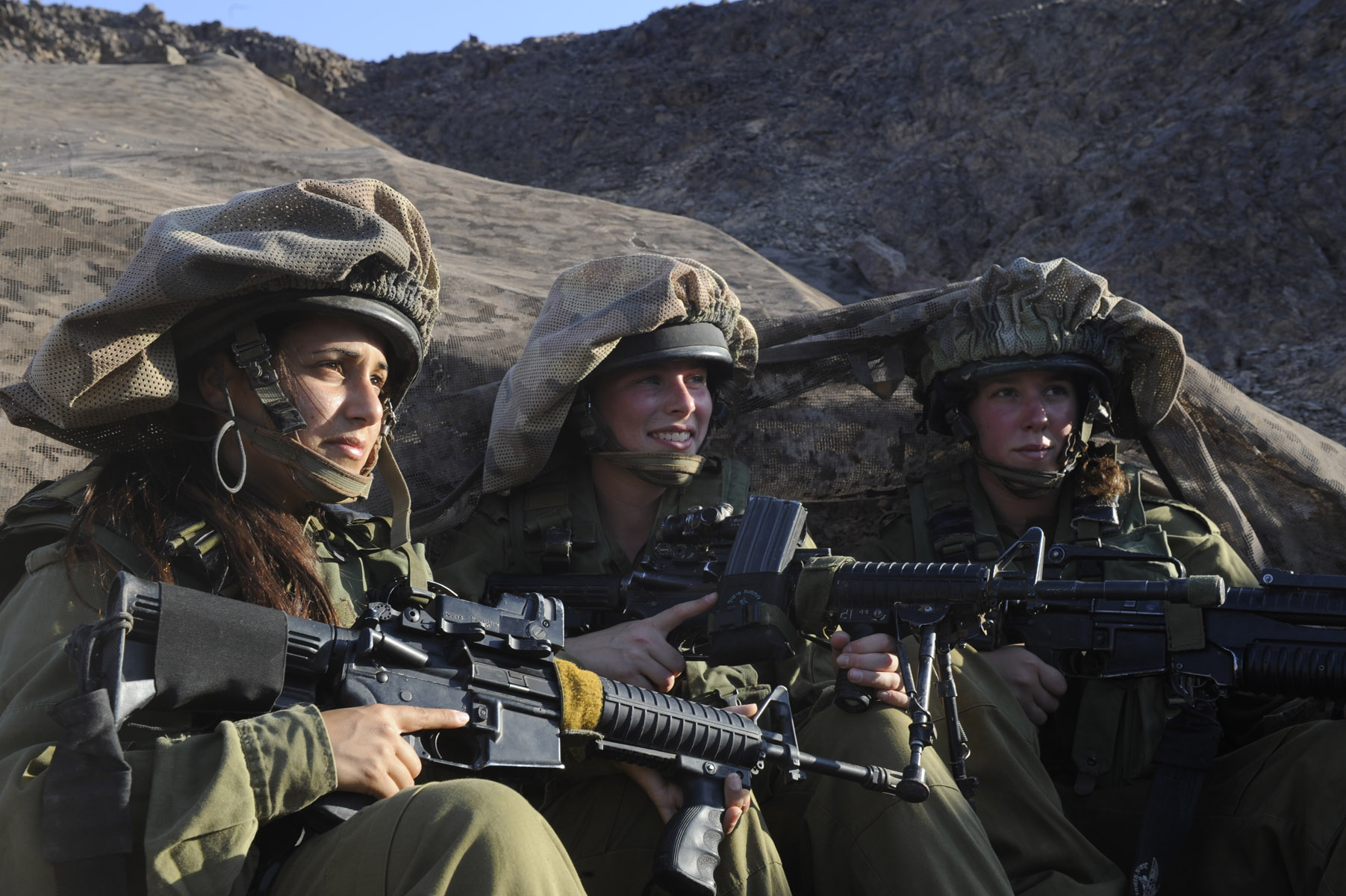
Female Combat Intelligence Collection soldiers during training

The Combat Intelligence Collection Corps (Hebrew: מערך האיסוף הקרבי; previously known as Field Intelligence Corps) is the newest of the Israel Defense Forces GOC Army Headquarters' five corps, created in April 2000 and tasked with gathering military intelligence in combat areas to support air and ground combat units to be more effective in their operations. It is responsible for intelligence units from the battalion level and up to the entire force. Due to the need for collecting combat intelligence and in maintaining observation networks, it is in the midst of expansion.

== Units ==
The corps consists of the following units:

- Combat Intelligence Collection Corps
  - 414th Field Intelligence Battalion "Nesher" (Assigned to the 143rd Division – Gaza–Israel barrier)
  - 595th Field Intelligence Battalion "Ayit" - including 4 “Yachmam” special operations squads (Assigned to the 210th Division – Israel Syria border)
  - 636th Field Intelligence Battalion "Nitzan" (Assigned to the 877th Division – West Bank)
  - 727th Field Intelligence Battalion "Eitam" (Assigned to the 80th Division – Egypt–Israel barrier)
  - 869th Field Intelligence Battalion "Shahaf" (Assigned to the 91st Division – Israel Lebanon border)
  - Field Intelligence School, also known as Center for Reconnaissance and Intelligence.
  - Unit Command, in the IDF Central Command in HaKirya, Tel-Aviv

Each battalion includes foot soldiers, and female observers that control stationary cameras from a control center.

== Training ==
Two weeks after drafting, training commanders decide where each soldier will serve (which battalion) based upon the psychological, physical, and motivational state of the soldier. The training base is in the southern region of the Negev Desert, close to Eilat.

The requirements to join as a field recon specialist is a medical profile of 82 or 97, and intelligence score of at least 40.

Training pipeline:

- Basic Training 16 weeks (Rifleman 05) – Combat Intelligence School
- Advanced Training 20 weeks (Scout 07) – Combat Intelligence School
- Unit Training (here each unit has its own training that takes around 2 months) – Northern, Southern and Central command

== History ==
Israel has a long history of intelligence units and operations, dating back to the Palmach's "German Platoon". After the creation of the IDF, field intelligence units were formed on an ad-hoc basis, by the Regional Commands.

In 1993, the first dedicated field intelligence unit meant for operating in any front, the Yahmam (abbreviation for "Target Field Intelligence", also known as the Nitzan Commando), was created. The unit was designated to provide intelligence in real time and sighting enemy targets. It was appended to the GOC Army Headquarters and its soldiers wore black berets, even though they were under the direct command of the General Staff. During the 1982–2000 South Lebanon Conflict, it operated as an elite outfit tasked with collecting combat intelligence. After the February 4, 1997 Israeli helicopter disaster, in which the unit lost two men out of a total of 73 killed, the Supreme Court of Israel instructed to reveal their names, and consequently, the unit's existence was revealed to the public.

The unit was created as a corps in April 2000, under Amnon Sufrin. In late 2008, the GOC Army Headquarters decided to rename it to the "Combat Intelligence Collection Corps" from "Field Intelligence Corps", to emphasize its combat nature and to dissociate itself from the military intelligence directorate to which it was previously professionally subordinate to. The name was changed in November 2009. The corps' beret color was changed from dark green, which is associated with military intelligence, to yellow.

On October 7th, 2023 27 female members of Unit 414 of the Combat Intelligence Collection Corps were killed or captured by Hamas during the Nahal Oz attack.

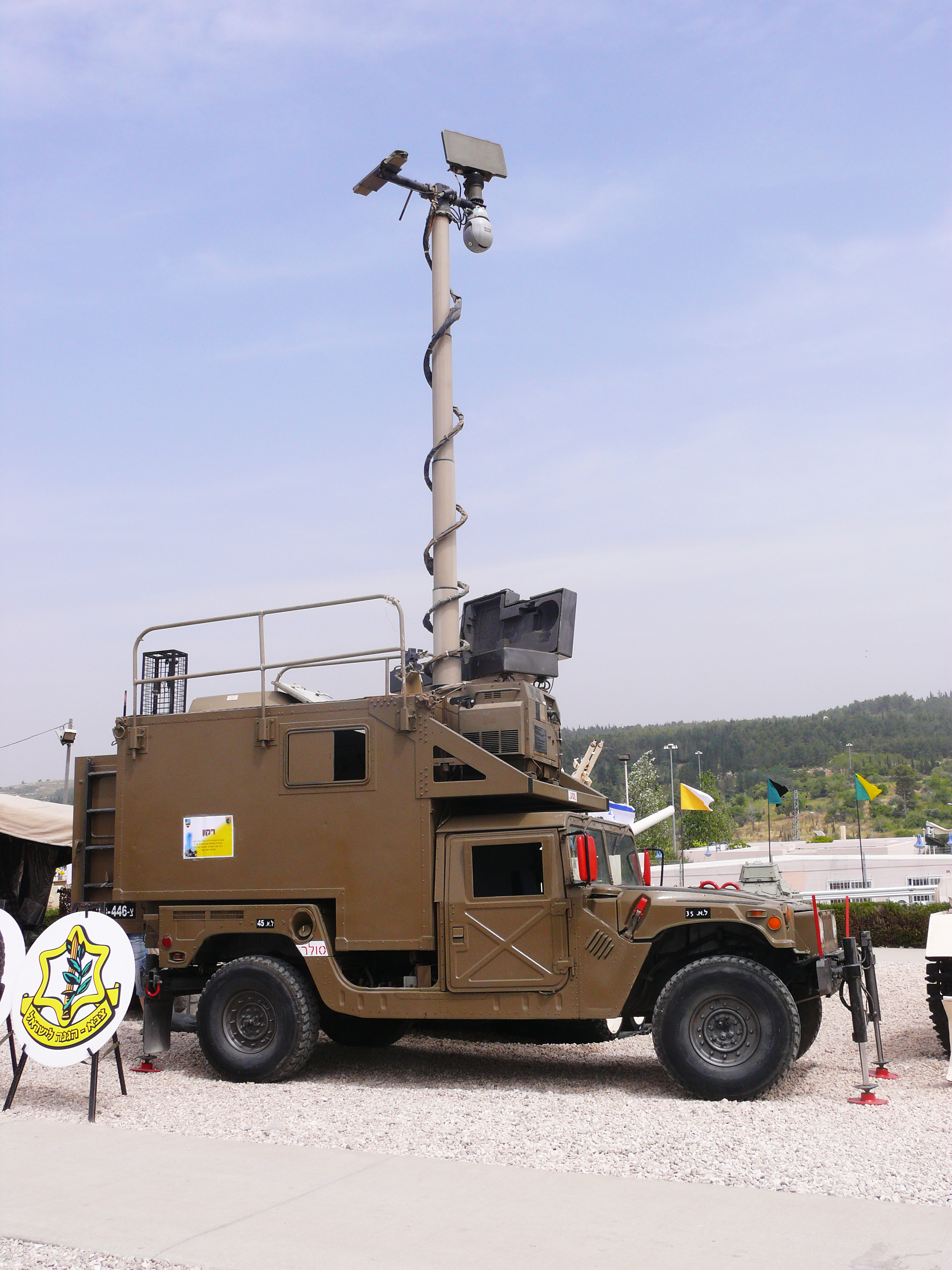
A "Racoon" recon and observation vehicle of the IDF's Combat Intelligence Collection Corps

== Chief combat intelligence Officer ==
The chief combat intelligence officer is a brigadier general appointed by the head of the GOC Army Headquarters.

Name	Years
Amnon Sufrin	2000–03
Yuval Halamish	2003–05
Guy Lipkin	2005–07
Ariel Karo	2007–09
Eli Pollack	2009–2012
Guy Bar-Lev	2012–2015
Mordechai Kahane	August 2015 – November 2017
Dan Neumann	November 2017 – July 2018
Amir Avstein	July 2018 –
