= Nahal Oz (kibbutz) =

Kibbutz in southern Israel

Nahal Oz: נחל עוז (Hebrew); ناحل عوز (Arabic)
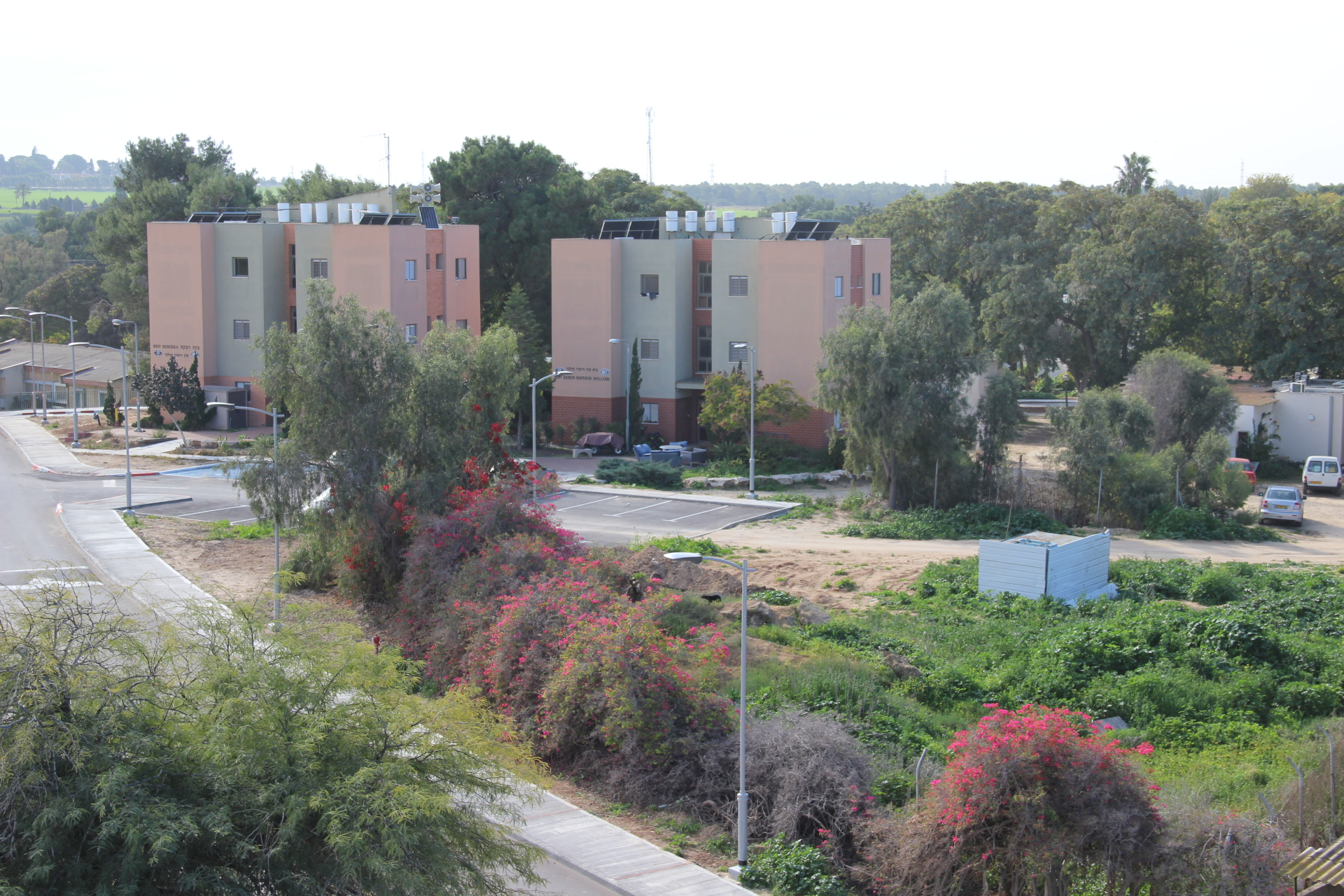
- Nahal Oz in 2015

- Location within Northwest Negev region of Israel Location within Israel
- Coordinates: 31°28′21″N 34°29′50″E
- Country: Israel
- District: Southern
- Subdistrict: Ashkelon
- Council: Sha'ar HaNegev
- Affiliation: Kibbutz Movement
- Founded: 1951
- Founder: Nahal
- Population (2024): 580
- Website: www.nahaloz.org.il (in Hebrew)

Nahal Oz (Hebrew: נחל עוז, lit. 'Mighty Stream' (Note: The name ""Mighty Stream, Hebrew: נחל עוז is a pun with Hebrew: נַחַ"ל עֹז, lit. "Mighty Nahal")) is a kibbutz in southern Israel. Located in the northwestern part of the Negev desert close to the border with the Gaza Strip and near the development towns of Sderot and Netivot, it is under the jurisdiction of Sha'ar HaNegev Regional Council. In 2024, it had a population of 580. A nearby IDF military base is known by the same name.

== History ==
The kibbutz was founded in 1951 as the country's first Nahal settlement. It was initially referred to as Nahlayim Mul Aza (Hebrew: נחלאים מול עזה, lit. Nahal soldiers across from Gaza). In 1953 it became a civilian community. Most members came from Israeli cities and were close to Mapai.

When an Israeli reporter from Haaretz visited the kibbutz in 1955, he described the residents, most of them native born Israelis, as utterly fearless despite the constant shelling by Egyptians across the border, who called the kibbutz "the village of death."

=== Murder of Ro'i Rothberg and Moshe Dayan's eulogy ===
In April 1956, the kibbutz security officer Ro'i Rothberg was ambushed and killed by infiltrators from Gaza. Rutenberg's funeral was attended by Moshe Dayan, then Chief of Staff, who gave a widely acclaimed eulogy which called upon Israel to search its soul and probe the national mindset.

"Early yesterday morning Roi was murdered. The quiet of the spring morning dazzled him and he did not see those waiting in ambush for him, at the edge of the furrow. Let us not cast the blame on the murderers today. Why should we declare their burning hatred for us? For eight years they have been sitting in the refugee camps in Gaza, and before their eyes we have been transforming the lands and the villages, where they and their fathers dwelt, into our estate. It is not among the Arabs in Gaza, but in our own midst that we must seek Roi's blood. How did we shut our eyes and refuse to look squarely at our fate, and see, in all its brutality, the destiny of our generation? Have we forgotten that this group of young people dwelling at Nahal Oz is bearing the heavy gates of Gaza on its shoulders? Beyond the furrow of the border, a sea of hatred and desire for revenge is swelling, awaiting the day when serenity will dull our path, for the day when we will heed the ambassadors of malevolent hypocrisy who call upon us to lay down our arms. Roi's blood is crying out to us and only to us from his torn body. Although we have sworn a thousandfold that our blood shall not flow in vain, yesterday again we were tempted, we listened, we believed.
We will make our reckoning with ourselves today; we are a generation that settles the land and without the steel helmet and the cannon's maw, we will not be able to plant a tree and build a home. Let us not be deterred from seeing the loathing that is inflaming and filling the lives of the hundreds of thousands of Arabs who live around us. Let us not avert our eyes lest our arms weaken. This is the fate of our generation. This is our life's choice—to be prepared and armed, strong and determined, lest the sword be stricken from our fist and our lives cut down. The young Roi who left Tel Aviv to build his home at the gates of Gaza to be a wall for us was blinded by the light in his heart and he did not see the flash of the sword. The yearning for peace deafened his ears and he did not hear the voice of murder waiting in ambush. The gates of Gaza weighed too heavily on his shoulders and overcame him."

=== 1997–2023 events ===
Privatization of the kibbutz began in 1997.

On 22 August 2014, during Operation Protective Edge, four-year-old resident of the kibbutz Daniel Tregerman was killed by mortar fire from the Gaza Strip.

The military post of Nahal Oz in 2015

=== 2023 Hamas-led attack ===
Nahal Oz military post, a room used to monitor the Palestinian territory of Gaza, following the Hamas attack on October 7, 2023

In October 2023, dozens of Hamas militants entered Nahal Oz during the October 7 attacks. The militants attacked the nearby military post, killing 41 members of the Golani Brigade and 20 soldiers in the Combat Intelligence Collection Corps. The militants deployed a flammable substance against the soldiers at the base, which also released toxic gases that caused suffocation.

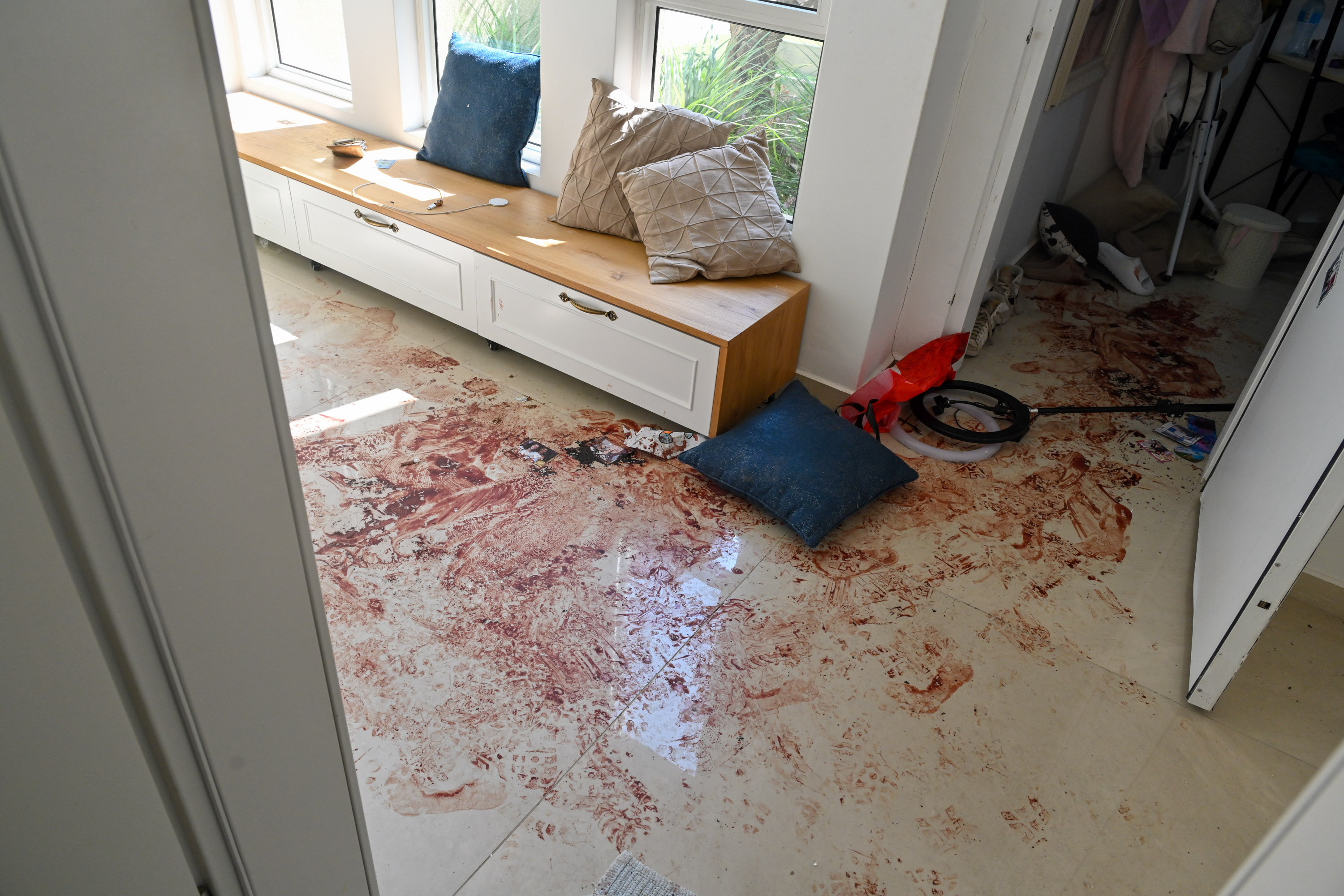
Aftermath of the attack

Some of the militants also broke into the kibbutz, killing 15 civilians and taking 8 others hostage. The kibbutz was held by Hamas for 12 hours, until the Israel Defense Forces (IDF) killed the militants and took back control of the kibbutz. Hamas also took hostage a family of five, both parents and their three children, and retreated with them to Gaza. The kidnapping was livestreamed by militants using the mother's phone, alerting the rest of the family of the kidnapping. Arson and vandalism carried out by Hamas militants left a significant number of homes destroyed or uninhabitable, leading to the displacement of the residents of the kibbutz.

Historically, many voters in Nahal Oz and other kibbutzes along the border with Gaza had been supporters of left-wing Israeli political parties. In the 2026 Israeli legislative election, the first balloting after the October 7 attacks, many residents were shifting to more right-wing parties. A spokesman for the kibbutz said that "people changed their minds" in the three years since the attacks that left 16 residents dead.

== Economy ==
The kibbutz grows carrots, cotton and wheat, and operates a dairy with 600 cows. Past sources of income include a metal works factory that produced industrial-sized ratchet bits and a high tech firm, OzVision, that links security cameras to the Web. In February 2023, a team from Israel's National Infrastructure Committee came to inspect the area in preparation for building a 1,720-hectare (4,250-acre) solar panel field along the border.

== Notable residents ==
- Amir Tibon, journalist

== Gallery ==
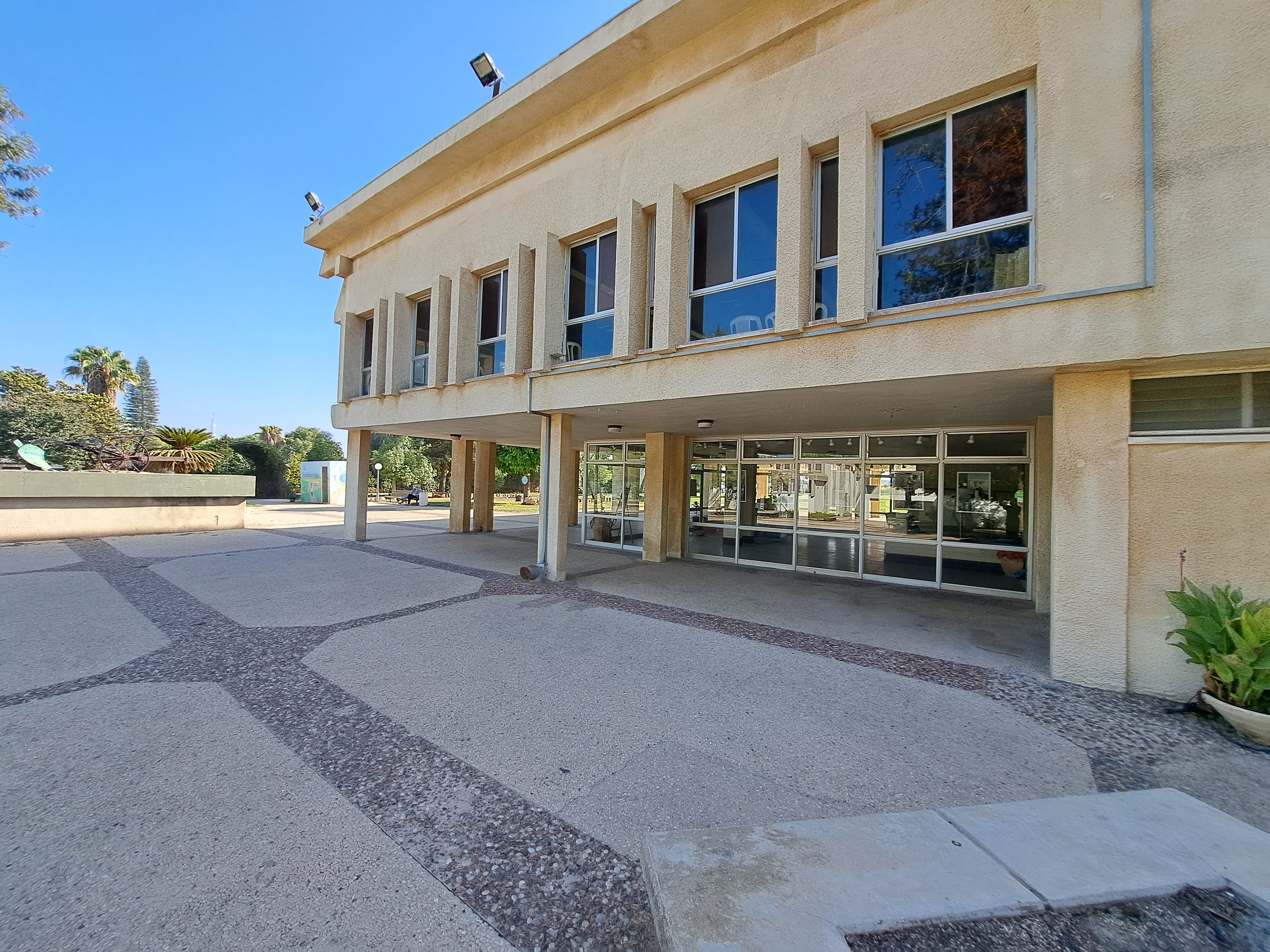
Dining Room

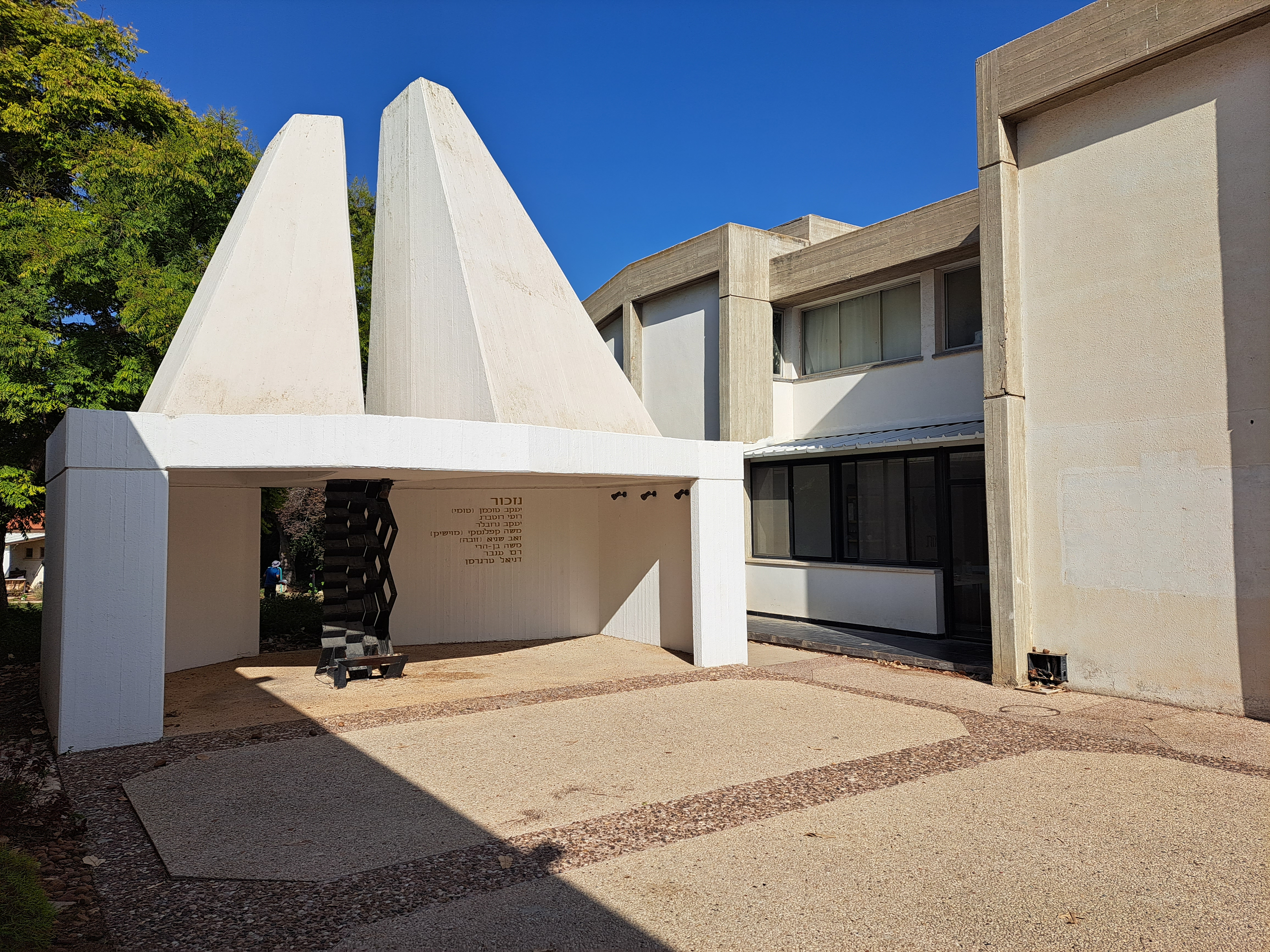
Memorial site

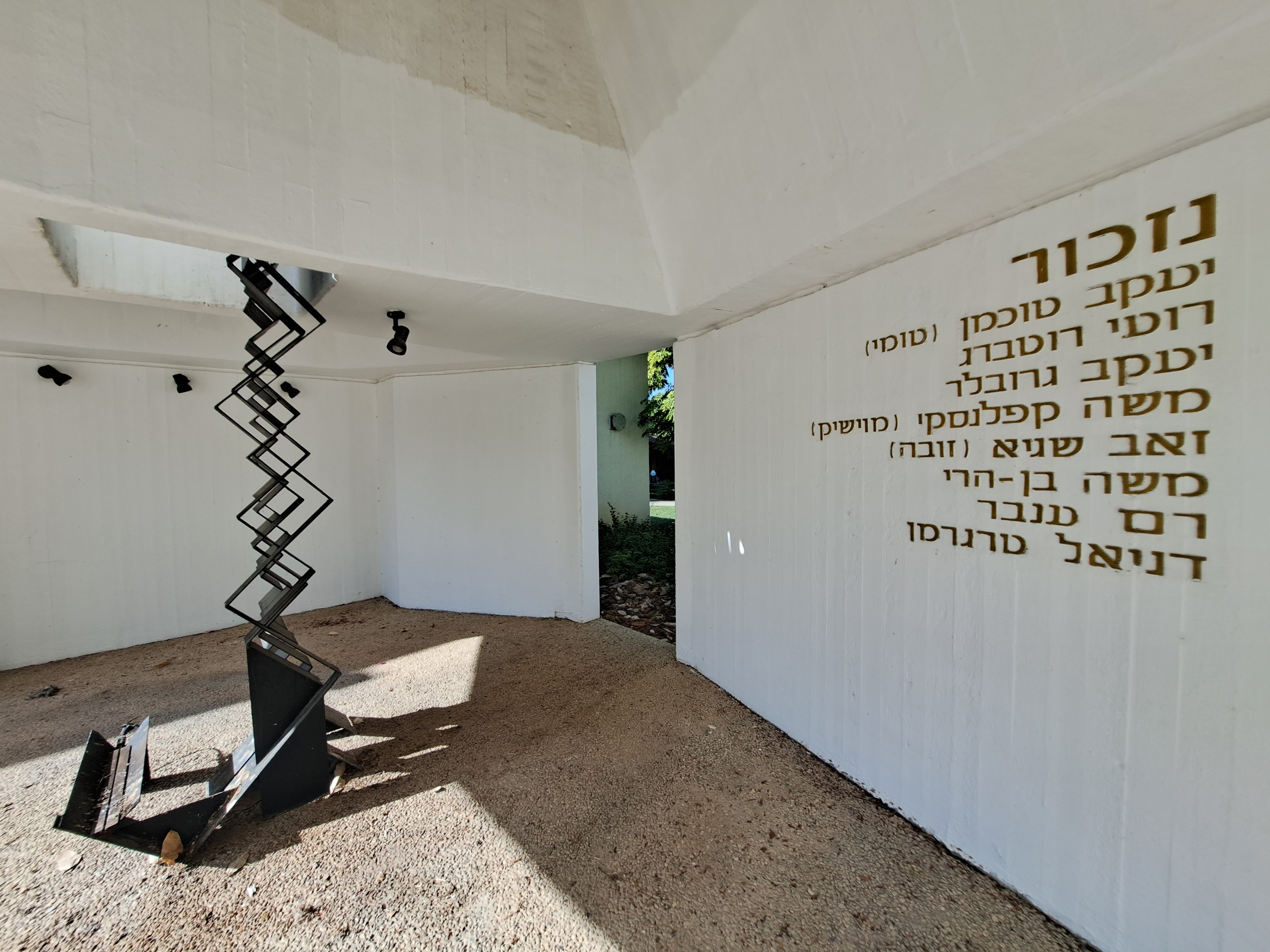
Memorial site

== See also ==
- Nahal Oz Observers Memorial Monument
