= Kidnapping of Agam Berger =

Israeli soldier and former hostage

- Part of Gaza war hostage crisis
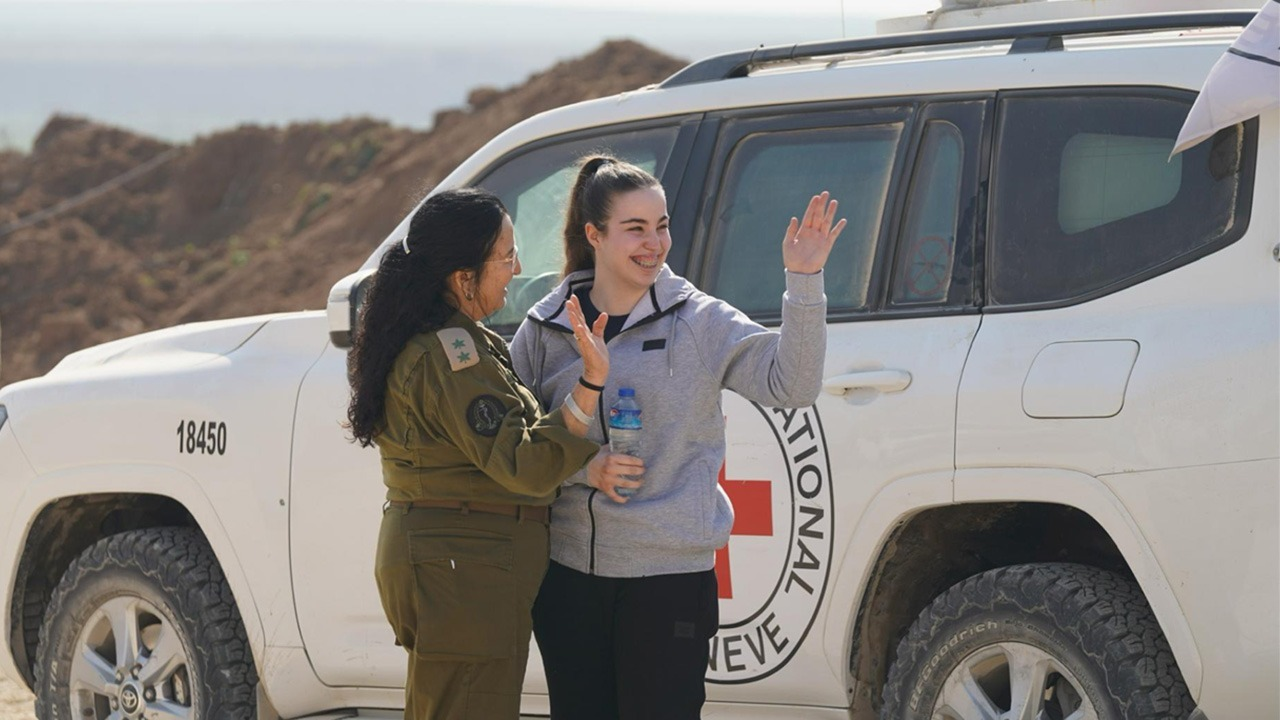
- Agam Berger after her release, January 30, 2025
- Date: October 7, 2023 – January 30, 2025
- Duration: 482 days
- Location: Nahal Oz, southern Israel

Agam Berger is an Israeli soldier who was abducted from the Nahal Oz outpost by Hamas during the October 7 attack on Israel in 2023 and held hostage in Gaza for 482 days. Her captivity and eventual release received widespread media attention in Israel and internationally. During her captivity, Berger intensified her Jewish faith, observing Shabbat and keeping kosher despite pressure and food shortages.

After her release as part of the January 2025 Gaza war ceasefire, Berger actively campaigned for the remaining hostages in Gaza, speaking alongside American elected officials and Jewish leaders and urging the global Jewish community to act for their return. An accomplished violinist, Berger was gifted a 130-year-old violin that belonged to a Holocaust victim and has performed at major commemorative events, including the March of the Living at Auschwitz-Birkenau.

== Background ==
Berger was born on August 22, 2004. Berger grew up in a fairly secular family in Holon with a twin sister and a brother who celebrated his bar mitzvah during her captivity. She began playing violin at the age of 8.

Just beginning her service in the IDF, Berger was originally supposed to be stationed at Kerem Shalom, but was reassigned to Nahal Oz at the last minute; she served just one day as a military lookout before her kidnapping.

== Kidnapping ==
In the middle of the Nahal Oz attack, Berger reportedly called her parents using the phone of a friend who was killed next to her. Berger described hearing shots being fired and people crying. She was abducted with six other soldiers to Gaza. In a Hamas Telegram video, Berger was seen being led to a car, bloodied and dressed in her pajamas.

== Captivity ==
Berger described how she was threatened by her captors, witnessed physical abuse and torture of other female hostages, and was required to stay quiet. She said her captors were "playing all the time with their guns and their hand grenades", disrespected the women and forced them to clean and prepare food. Berger increased her Shabbat observance while in captivity, later explaining, “ I was kidnapped because I’m Jewish. I risked my life to hold onto that identity. You can’t take away my free will – and you can’t take away my Judaism." She added that her captors viewed her religious observance as a positive attribute, even though they viewed the Jewish religion as false. When she and her fellow captives requested Chanukah candles, they were given only one. During Passover, Berger used corn flour and avoided leavened bread.

After Israeli forces rescued Shlomi Ziv, Noa Argamani, Andrey Kozlov, and Almog Meir Jan in June 2024, Berger's captors took away the radio she and her fellow captives used for news. Berger was held with Liri Albag, Karina Ariev, Daniella Gilboa, and Naama Levy. When the four were released in January 2025, Berger remained behind. Albag requested to stay behind in solidarity with Berger, but the captors refused. Berger said she was forced to film videos thanking her captors.

== Efforts to release ==
While Berger was in captivity, her family received a phone call from Agam Goldstein-Almog, a 17-year old hostage who had been released in November 2023. Goldstein-Almog told Berger's parents, "She will get out". Berger's family marked her 20th birthday in her absence with a Kabbalat Shabbat event at the Anu Museum of the Jewish People, featuring musical performances by Jane Bordeaux, Etti Ankri, and Yair Dalal. Berger briefly saw a broadcast of her mother speaking at the event before her captors shut off the television. Berger's parents began observing Shabbat after she was taken captive.

=== Release ===
In late January 2025, Berger was freed along with 7 other hostages as part of a ceasefire deal with Hamas. In a 'highly choreographed' ceremony in northern Gaza, Berger was released first.

== Post-release activities ==
Berger braided the hair of some Israeli children who were released from Hamas captivity during the temporary ceasefire in November 2023. After she braided the hair of Israeli female soldiers who were released in January 2025, “Braids for Agam” graphics circulated on social media in Israel and abroad. Events held in her honor included challah-braiding, a dedicated display at a wig store, and El Al women employees braiding their hair.

In May 2025, Berger spoke in New York alongside Mayor Eric Adams, declaring "A Jew is a messenger of hope – be messengers of hope for our hostages". Berger also met with French Foreign Minister Jean-Noel Barrot in Paris and told him that diplomatic efforts alone would not sway Hamas to return the remaining hostages.

Violinist Miri Ben-Ari, an American-Israeli Grammy winner, invited Berger to perform with her.

At the March of the Living at Auschwitz, Berger played a violin that survived the Holocaust, for an audience that included President Isaac Herzog and Polish President Andrzej Duda. Reflecting on that experience, Berger noted, "On Polish soil, I promised to keep this violin alive – and to play the eternal melody of the Jewish people."

== See also ==
- Kidnapping of Liri Albag
- Kidnapping of Naama Levy
- January 2025 Gaza war ceasefire
