= Joseph Barclay Pentland =

Irish geographer, natural scientist, traveler (1797–1873)

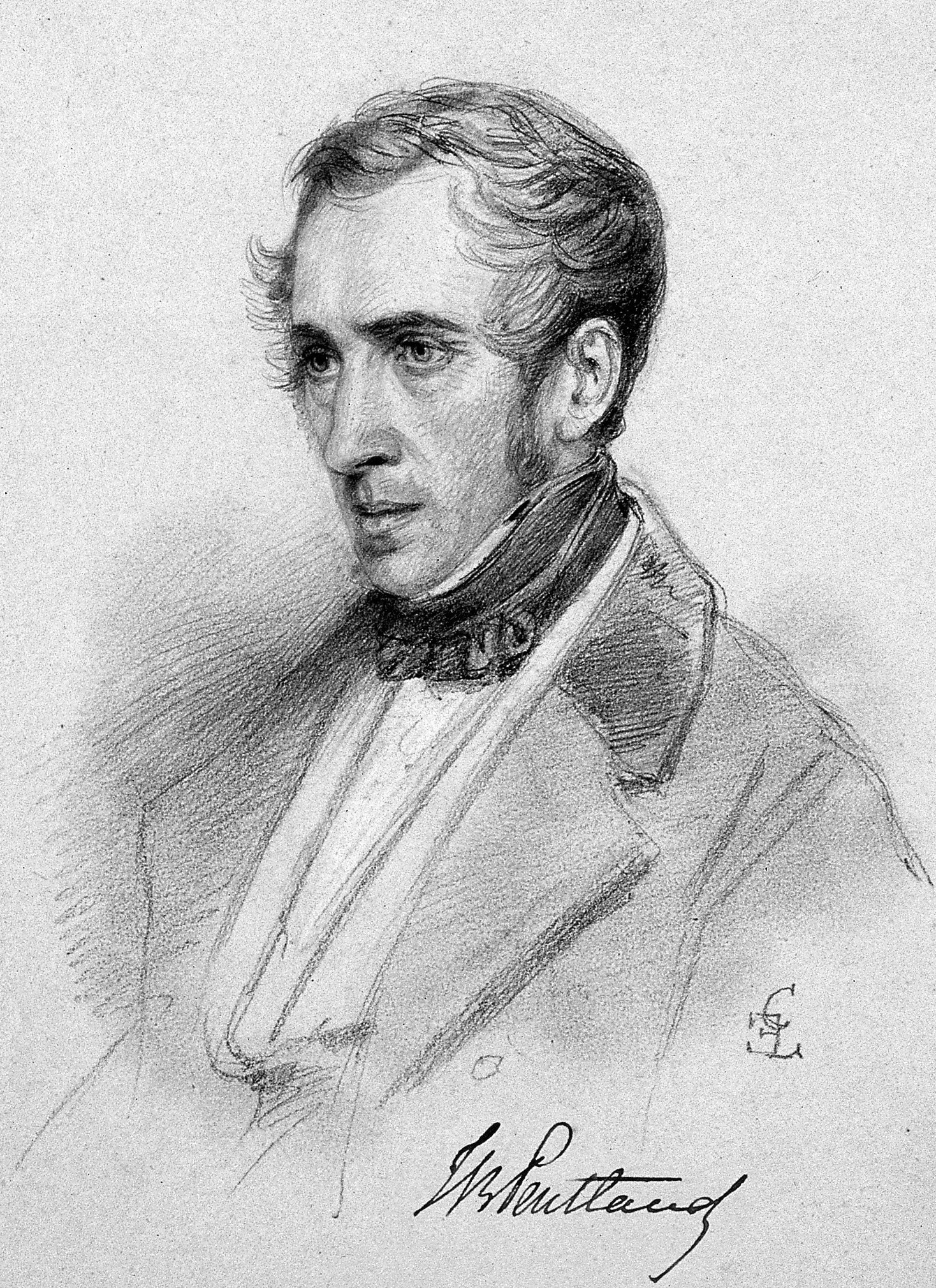
- Pencil drawing of Joseph Barclay Pentland by Carlo Ernesto Liverati
- Born: 17 January 1797; Ballybofey, Ireland
- Died: 12 January 1873 (aged 75); London
- Burial place: Brompton Cemetery, London
- Occupations: Geographer; natural scientist; traveler
- Notable work: Report on Bolivia

Joseph Barclay Pentland (17 January 1797 – 12 July 1873) was an Irish geographer, natural scientist, and traveller. Born in Ballybofey (County Donegal, Ireland), Pentland was educated at Armagh. He also studied in Paris, and worked with Georges Cuvier.

With Woodbine Parish, Pentland surveyed a large part of the Bolivian Andes between 1826 and 1827. He published his Report on Bolivia in 1827. From 1836 to 1839, he served as British consul-general in Bolivia. He corresponded with Charles Darwin and William Buckland.

Pentland died 12 July 1873 in London, and is buried in Brompton Cemetery, London.

== Legacy ==
- The mineral pentlandite, which Pentland first noted
- The crater Pentland on the Moon
- The Andean tinamou (binomial name, Nothoprocta pentlandii)
- The Puna tinamou (binomial name, Tinamotis pentlandii)
- The cactus Echinopsis pentlandii which Pentland discovered and sent to Kew Botanic Gardens, London

== Sources ==
- (in English) Mineral names
- (in English) The Darwin Correspondence Online Database
