= Giuseppe Giacinto Moris =

Italian botanist (1796–1869)

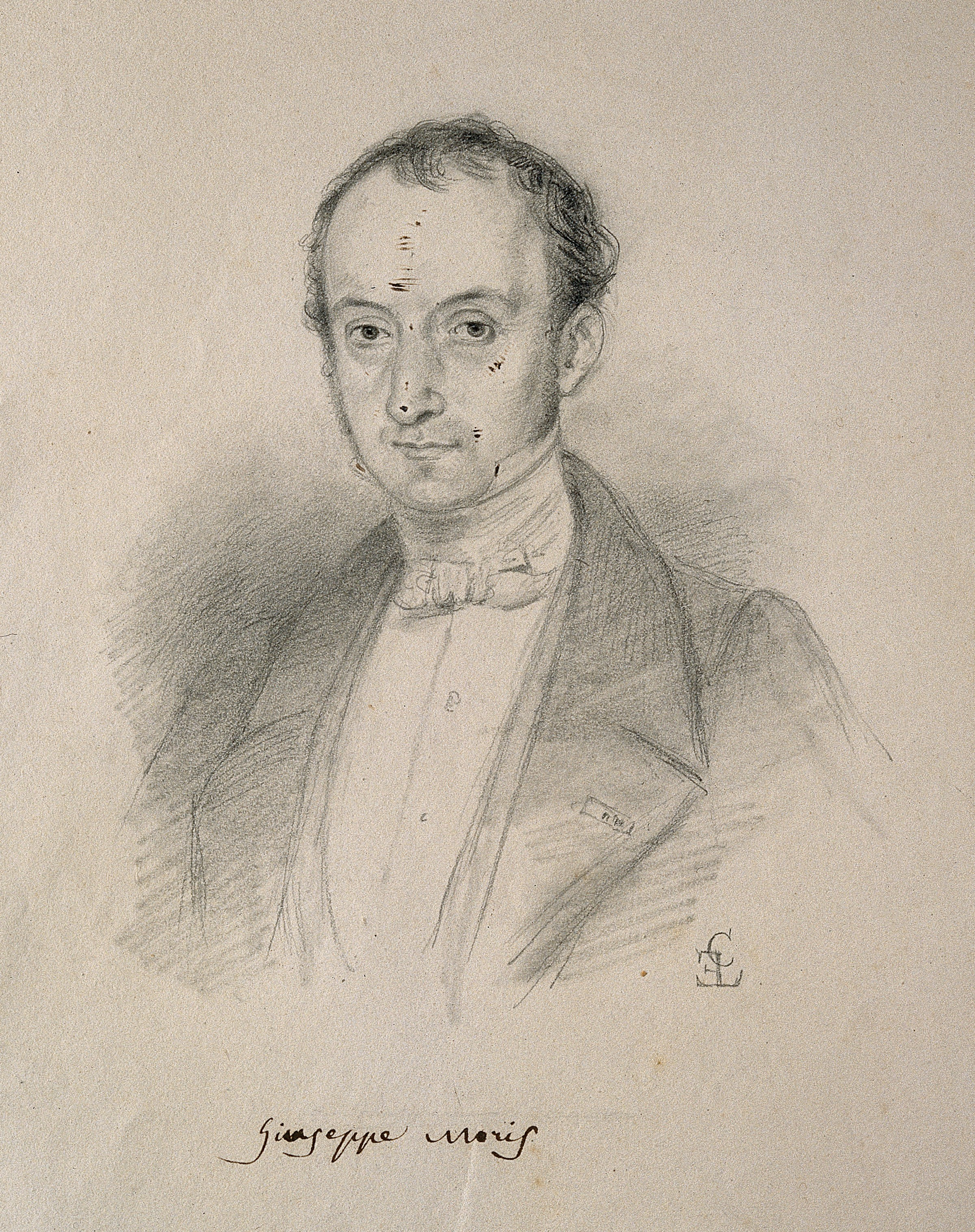
Giuseppe Giacinto Moris, pencil drawing by Carlo Ernesto Liverati.

Giuseppe Giacinto Moris (25 April 1796, Orbassano – 18 April 1869, Turin) was an Italian botanist known for investigations of flora native to Sardinia.

He studied medicine in Turin, from where he graduated while still in his teens. From 1822 to 1829, he worked as a professor at the University of Cagliari, afterwards returning to Turin as a professor at the university. Here, he was director of its botanical garden from 1831 until 1869.

He was the binomial authority of the genus Ridolfia (family Apiaceae) as well as of numerous plant species. In 1832, Jaques Étienne Gay named the genus Morisia (family Brassicaceae) in his honor.

== Principal works ==
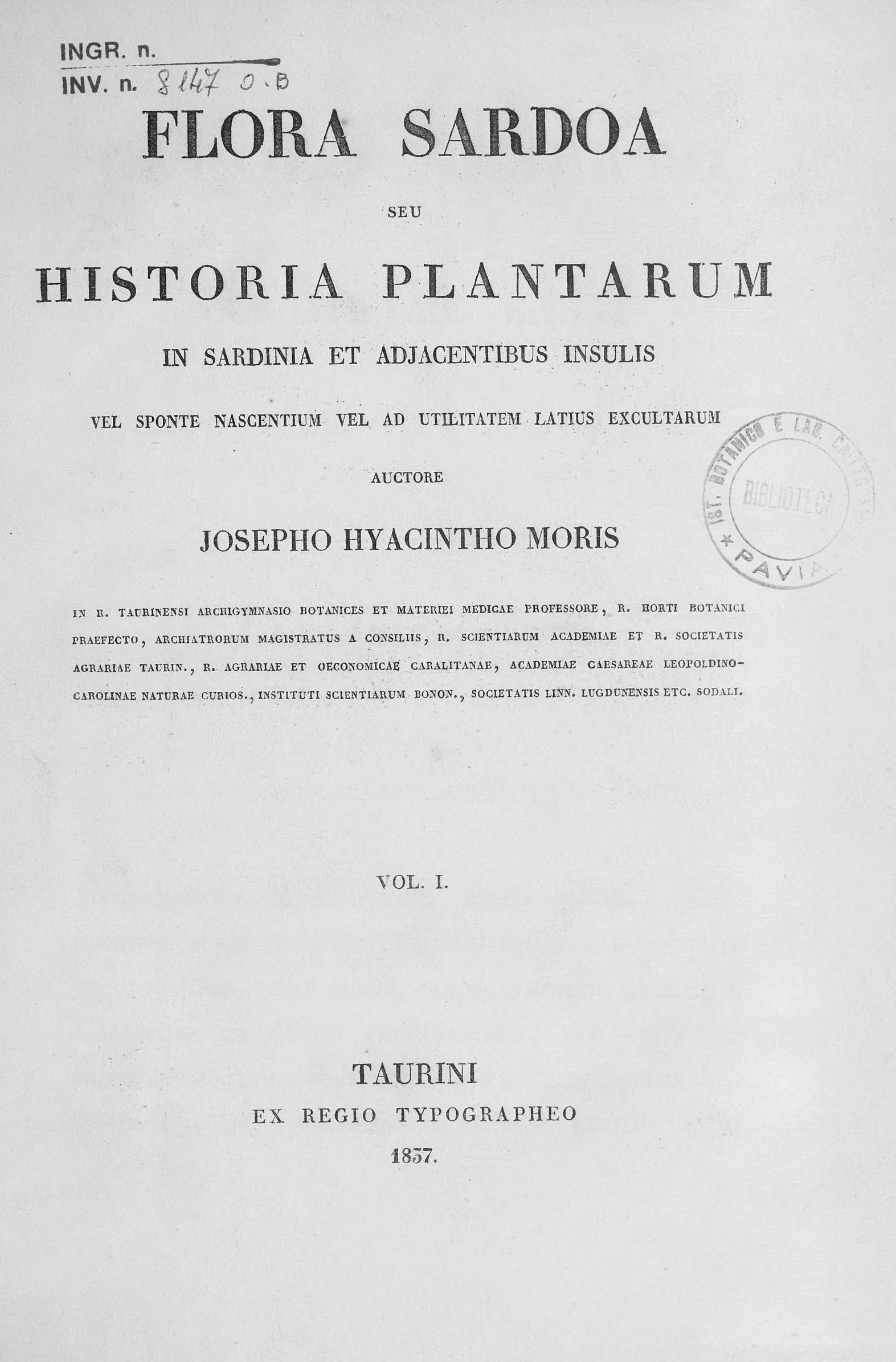
Flora sardoa, 1837

- Stirpium Sardoarum elenchus; 1827, 1829.
- Plantae Chilenses novae minusve cognitae, 1833.
- Flora Sardoa : seu historia plantarum in Sardinia et adjacentibus insulis vel sponte nascentium vel ad utilitatem latius excultarum, 1837.
- Flora sardoa (in Latin). Vol. 1. Torino: Stamperia reale. 1837.
- Flora sardoa (in Latin). Vol. 2. Torino: Stamperia reale. 1840–1843.
- Flora sardoa (in Latin). Vol. 3. Torino: Stamperia reale. 1858–1859.
- Florula Caprariae : sive, Enumeratio plantarum in insula Capraria : vel sponte nascentium vel ad utilitatem latius excultarum, 1839 (with Giuseppe De Notaris).
- Enumeratio seminum Regni Horti Botanici Taurinensis, 1860.
