= Yarhiv =

Moshav in central Israel

Yarhiv: יַרְחִיב (Hebrew)
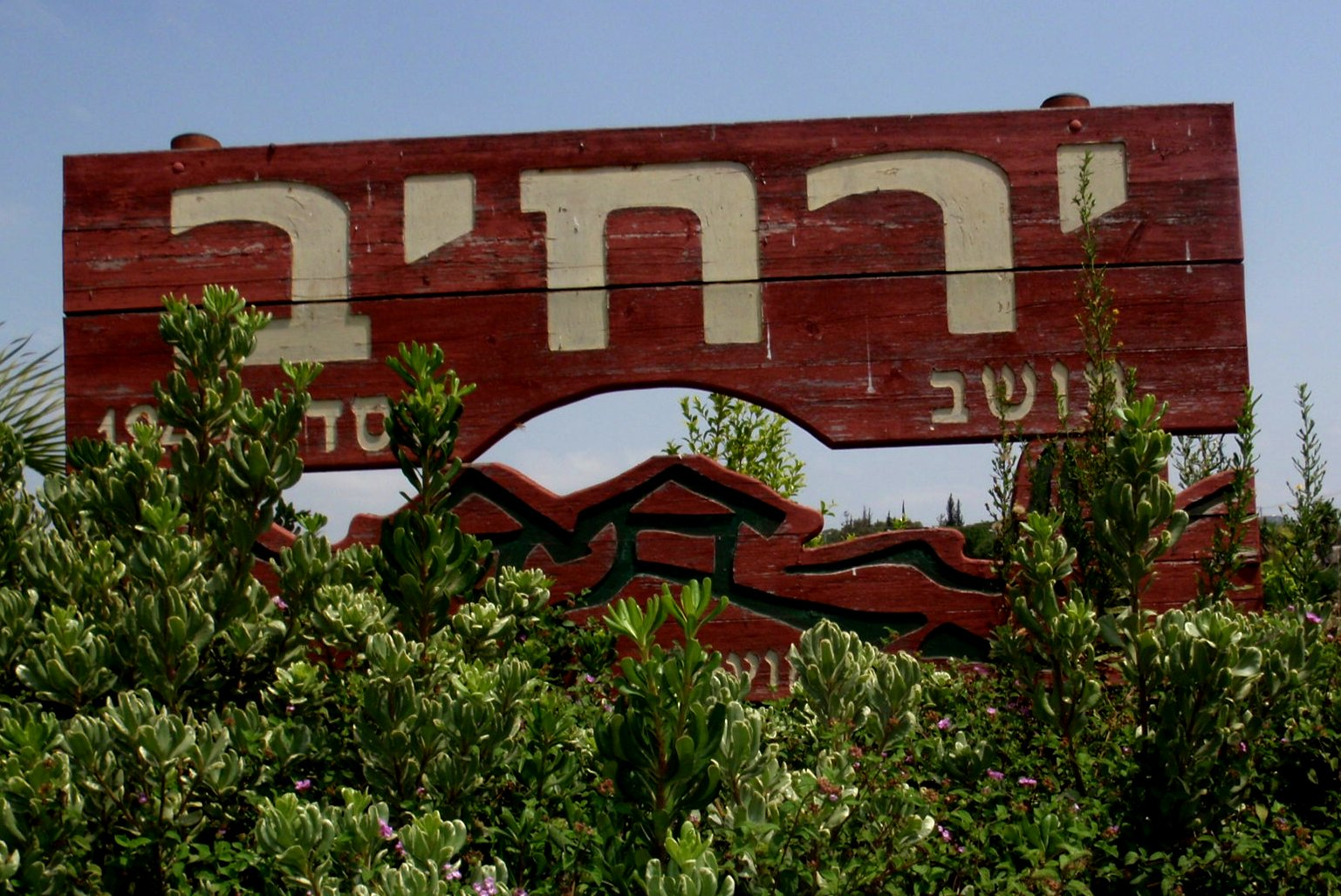

- Location within Central Israel
- Coordinates: 32°9′8″N 34°58′4″E
- Country: Israel
- District: Central
- Subdistrict: Petah Tikva
- Council: Drom HaSharon
- Affiliation: Moshavim Movement
- Founded: 1949
- Founder: Demobbed IDF soldiers
- Population (2024): 1,182

Yarhiv (Hebrew: יַרְחִיב, lit. [He] will Enlarge) is a moshav in central Israel. Located near Jaljulia, Matan and Nirit, it falls under the jurisdiction of Drom HaSharon Regional Council. In 2024 it had a population of 1,182.

== History ==
The moshav was founded in 1949 by demobilised IDF soldiers. Its name is taken from Deuteronomy 12:20:

When the LORD thy God shall enlarge thy border, as He hath promised thee, and thou shalt say: 'I will eat flesh', because thy soul desireth to eat flesh; thou mayest eat flesh, after all the desire of thy soul.

== Notable resident ==
- Liri Albag
