= Kidnapping of Liri Albag =

Israeli hostage taken by Hamas in 2023

- Part of the Gaza war hostage crisis
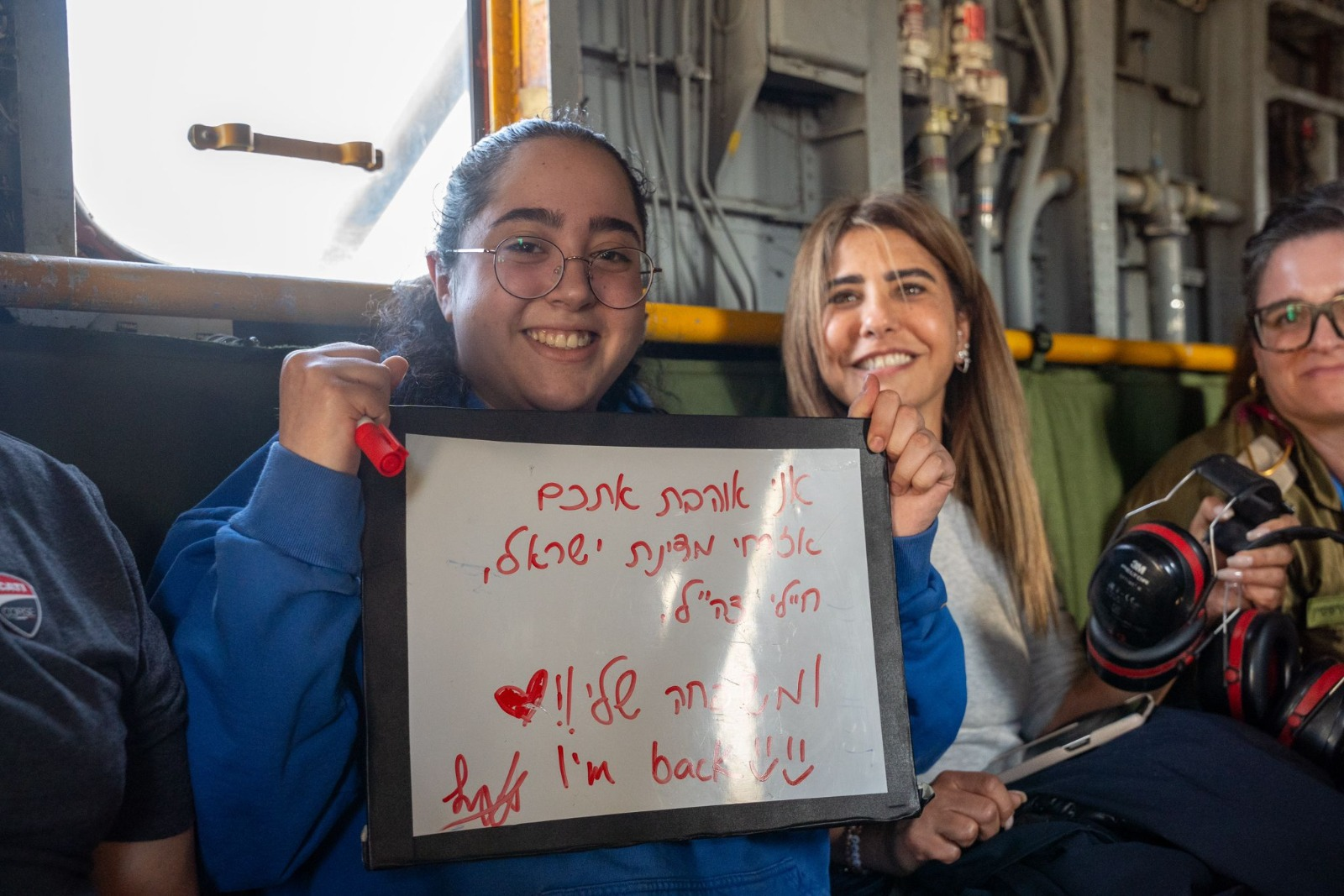
- Liri Albag after her release, 25 January 2025
- Location: 31°28′21″N 34°29′50″E; Nahal Oz, Southern District, Israel
- Date: October 7, 2023 – January 25, 2025
- Attack type: Kidnapping
- Perpetrator: Hamas

Liri Albag (Hebrew: לירי אלבג) is an Israeli woman serving in Israel Defense Forces (IDF) who was kidnapped and taken hostage by Hamas in Nahal Oz during the October 7 attacks. Albag's experience as a hostage held by Hamas for 477 days received significant national and international media attention, not only because of the duration and harshness of her captivity but also due to her actions during that time. Albag emerged as a leader among the hostages, communicating with captors on behalf of others. She was credited with saving the life of fellow hostage Amit Soussana by convincing captors that Soussana was not an IDF officer, likely preventing her execution.

Albag's ordeal and subsequent release were the subject of major interviews and media reports, in which she described the psychological and physical trauma she endured as well as her perspective on the ongoing conflict in Gaza. After her release, Albag became a public advocate for remaining hostages and has spoken at public events. She has resumed her military service, a decision covered by major Israeli news outlets and seen as a symbol of resilience and commitment. Albag's experiences and actions have made her a recognized figure in Israel and internationally, especially in the context of the Gaza war and the campaign for the release of hostages.

== Biography ==
Albag was born in Matan, the daughter of Shira and Eli Albag; she had three siblings and lived in Moshav Yarhiv at the time of her kidnapping. At age 18, she enlisted in the Israeli Defence Forces and trained to be a lookout, after which she was assigned to the Nahal Oz outpost. Two days into her service after completing her training, Hamas launched Operation Al-Aqsa Flood.

== Kidnapping ==
Albag was serving as an observer at the Nahal Oz base when the outpost was attacked and overrun by Hamas early in the morning of 7 October 2023. When the attack began, Albag was off duty and asleep in the sleeping quarters along with fellow observers Naama Levy and Noam Abramowitz; they were awakened at 6:30 by a rocket attack on the base and rushed to a bomb shelter, along with other off-duty female personnel. Hamas members stormed the shelter and killed most of the occupants, capturing seven survivors, including Albag. Along with fellow observers Agam Berger, Karina Ariev, and Daniella Gilboa, Albag was loaded into a military jeep by Hamas fighters and taken into the Gaza Strip.

Footage of the abduction, filmed on Hamas militants' body cameras, was released by the Hostages and Missing Families Forum on 22 May 2024 to press for a hostage deal. The families published a heavily censored three-minute version of more than 13 minutes of footage. In it, Albag is heard asking for "someone who speaks English".

== Captivity in the Gaza Strip ==
After arriving in Gaza, Albag and the other captured observers were initially held in an apartment, where after two days Albag and Berger were separated from Ariev and Gilboa. Albag spent the entirety of her captivity together with Berger, joined at times by other hostages, including Naama Levy, Keith and Aviva Siegel, the Almog-Goldstein family, Romi Gonen, Emily Damari, Amit Soussana, and Dafna and Ella Elyakim.

Initially Albag and other female captives were held in private homes, including a luxury villa, where they cleaned yards, did dishes, babysat their captors' children, and prepared food they were not allowed to eat. After 40 days, they were moved to underground tunnels. Albag later described being held for some time in an underground cage roughly 2×2 meters in area and 1.6 meters high, along with four other young women, where they were fed "a quarter of a pita, a date and half a bowl of rice a day"; there was a hole in the floor 800 meters away for them to use as a toilet.

According to former civilian hostage Amit Soussana, Albag saved her life by persuading their captors that Soussana was not an IDF officer. In one instance, Albag asked for Chanukah candles. She later said, "the only thing I did not lose was Judaism."

In March 2024, the IDF reported finding Albag's DNA in a house in Gaza.

On 4 January 2025, the Al-Qassam Brigades published a video in which Albag said, "the Israeli army's military operations will not succeed in rescuing the captives."

== Advocacy for Albag's release ==
Albag's father, Eli, was one of the more visible participants in the Israeli hostage deal protests. He reported being routinely attacked and harassed for calling for Albag's release and criticizing the Israeli government. In October 2023, a counter-protester called Eli a "traitor" and wished for Albag's death. After finance minister Bezalel Smotrich said in February 2024 that releasing the hostages was not the most important goal of the Gaza war, Eli criticized his remarks. The Albag family received a funeral wreath in April 2024 with the statement: "May her memory be a blessing - Liri Albag. But everyone knows the country is more important." Shin Bet said it might have been sent by Iran. In September 2024, Eli protested outside a Likud event. Counter-protesters threw eggs at him, called him a "cancer", and accused him of being funded by Hamas. The incident was condemned by MK Miki Zohar.

== Release ==
On 24 January 2025, Hamas announced that Albag and three other female IDF soldiers would be released the next day as part of the hostage exchange during the January 2025 Gaza war ceasefire. On 25 January 2025, Albag, Ariev, Gilboa and Levy were taken to Palestine Square in Gaza City, where Hamas and Palestinian Islamic Jihad fighters had gathered. The four were marched onto a podium where they waved and smiled, "likely under duress" according to Al Jazeera. The four were handed over to the International Committee of the Red Cross, who then transferred them to Israeli forces. In exchange, Israel released 200 Palestinian prisoners from Ofer Prison. Israel said the civilian hostage Arbel Yehoud should have been freed before the soldiers, and Prime Minister Benjamin Netanyahu said displaced Palestinians would not be allowed to return to northern Gaza until the issue was resolved.

== After her release ==
In June 2025, Albag declared her intention to return to the Israel Defense Forces.

During Operation True Promise III, she said that Iranian intelligence benefits from published photos of Israel and argued that such photos should be avoided.

In July 2025, Albag met with Gal Gadot along with freed hostages Doron Steinbrecher, Naama Levy, Moran Stella Yanai, and Ilana Gritzewsky.
