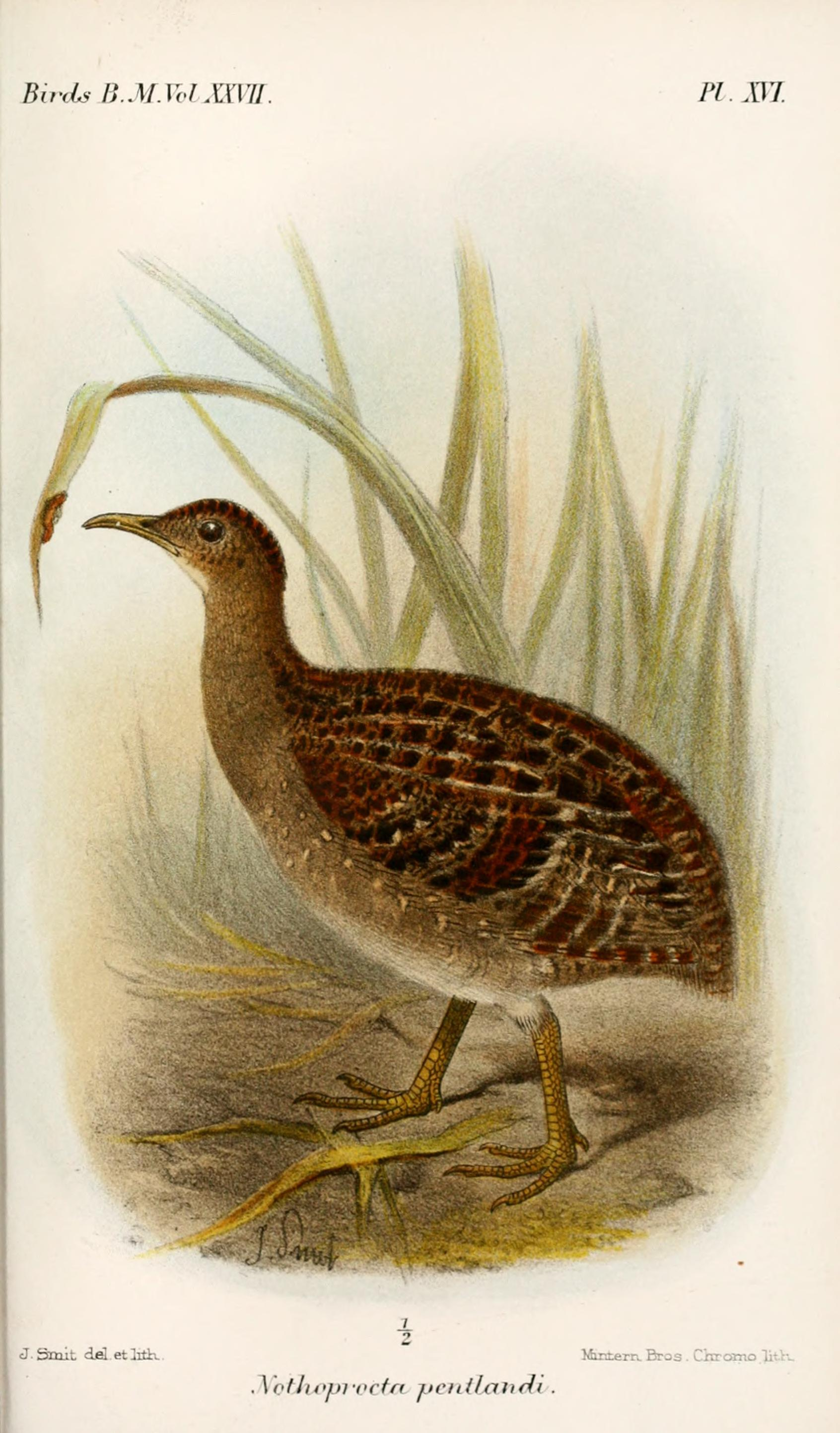
- Illustration by Joseph Smit, 1895

Conservation status
- Least Concern (IUCN 3.1)]

Scientific classification
- Kingdom: Animalia
- Phylum: Chordata
- Class: Aves
- Infraclass: Palaeognathae
- Order: Tinamiformes
- Family: Tinamidae
- Genus: Nothoprocta
- Species: N. pentlandii

Binomial name
- Nothoprocta pentlandii (Gray, GR, 1867)

Subspecies
- N. p. pentlandii Gray 1867; N. p. ambigua Cory 1915; N. p. oustaleti Berlepsch & Stolzmann 1901; N. p. niethammeri Koepcke 1968; N. p. fulvescens Berlepsch 1902; N. p. doeringi Cabanis 1878; N. p. mendozae Banks & Bohl 1968

= Andean tinamou =

Species of bird

The Andean tinamou (Nothoprocta pentlandii) is a tinamou, found commonly in high-altitude shrubland, in the Andes of South America.

== Taxonomy ==
All tinamou are from the family Tinamidae, and in the larger scheme are also ratites. Unlike other ratites, tinamous can fly, although in general, they are not strong fliers. All ratites evolved from prehistoric flying birds, and tinamous are the closest living relative of these birds. Pentlandii is the Latin form of Pentland which commemorates the Irish Traveller Joseph Barclay Pentland.

=== Subspecies ===
The Andean tinamou has seven subspecies:

- N. p. pentlandii, the nominate race, occurs in the Andes of western Bolivia, northwestern Argentina, and extreme northern Chile.
- N. p. ambigua occurs in the Andes of southern Ecuador and northwestern Peru.
- N. p. oustaleti occurs on the west slope of the Andes in central and southern Peru.
- N. p. niethammeri occurs in coastal central Peru.
- N. p. fulvescens occurs in the Andes of southeastern Peru.
- N. p. doeringi occurs in the Sierras de Córdoba in San Luis and Córdoba Provinces, Argentina.
- N. p. mendozae occurs in the Andes of west central Argentina in Neuquén and Mendoza Provinces.

== Description ==
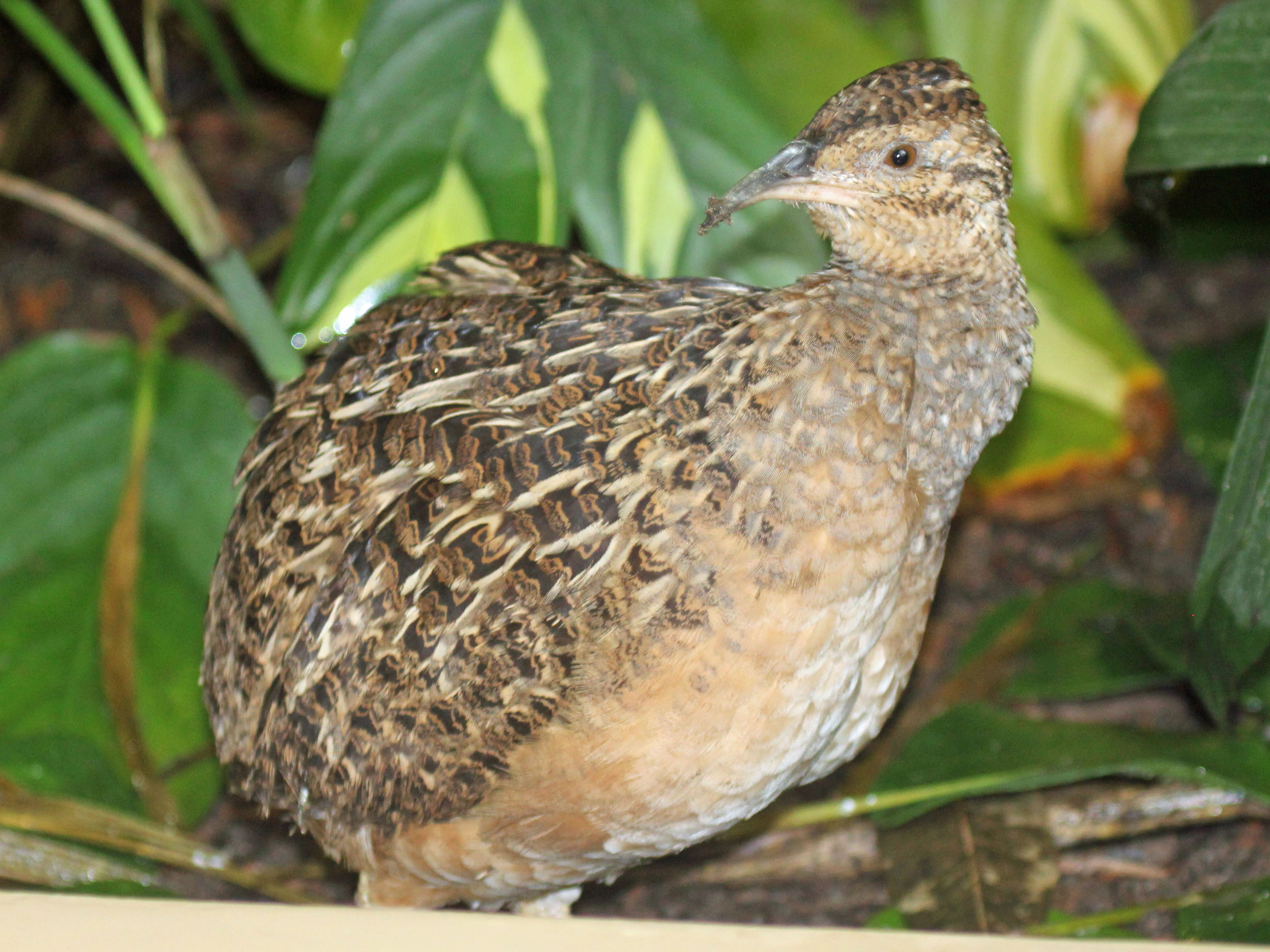
Andean tinamou, San Francisco Zoo

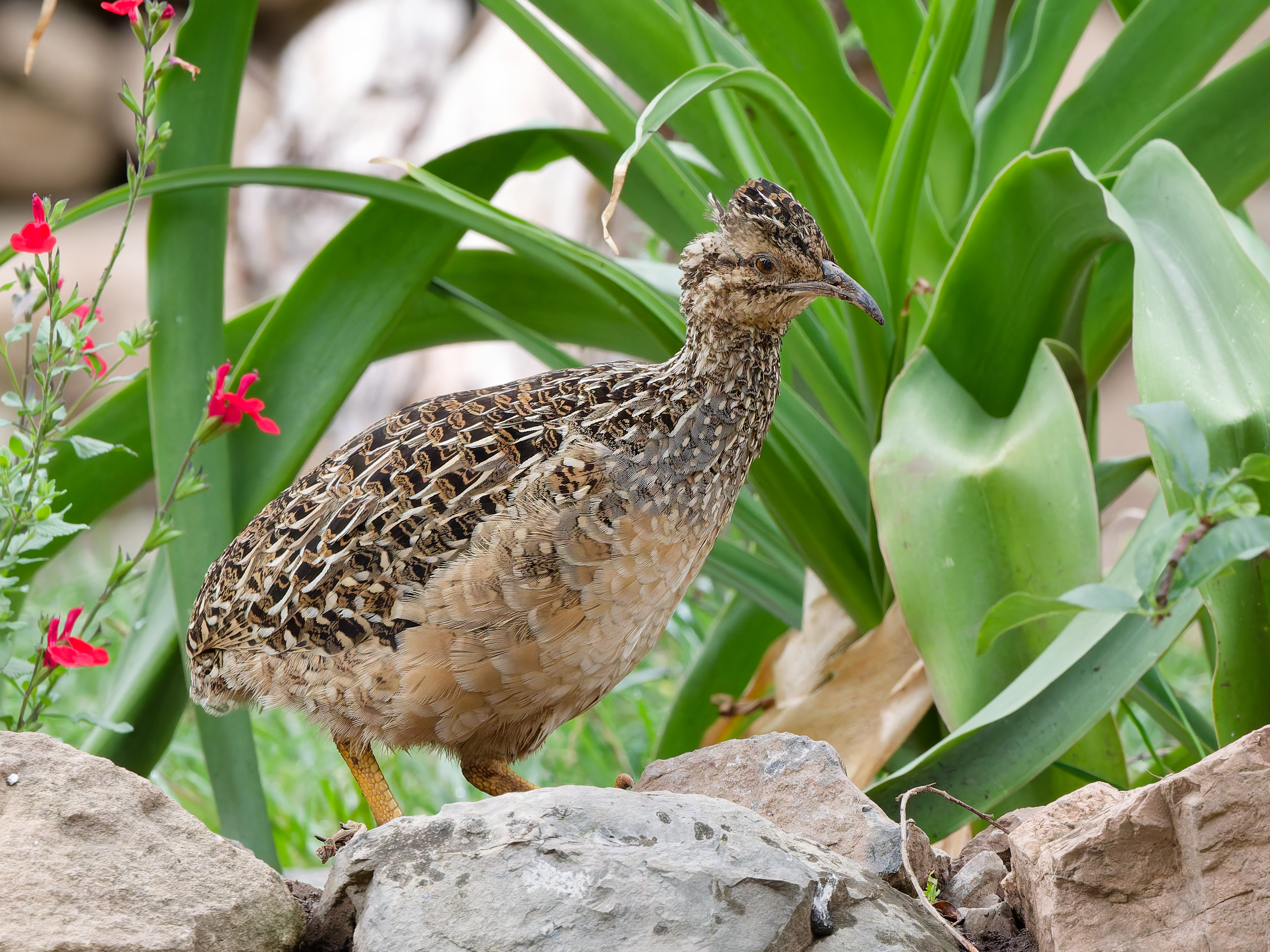
Andean tinamou in Peru

The Andean tinamou is approximately 27 cm (11 in) in length. Its upper parts are greyish-brown to olive brown and barred with black and white. Its breast is grey and spotted with white or buff, its belly is buff or whitish and its crown is black, the sides of its head and throat are mottled grey, and its legs are yellow.

== Range and habitat ==
The Andean tinamou can be found in the Andes from southern Ecuador to central Chile, as well as in the Sierras de Córdoba in Argentina.

It prefers subtropical and tropical shrubland at 800 to 4,100 m (2,600–13,500 ft) altitude.

== Conservation ==
The IUCN classifies the Andean tinamou as Least Concern, with an occurrence range of 550,000 km^{2} (210,000 sq mi).
