= Nirit =

Community settlement in central Israel

Nirit: נִירִית (Hebrew)
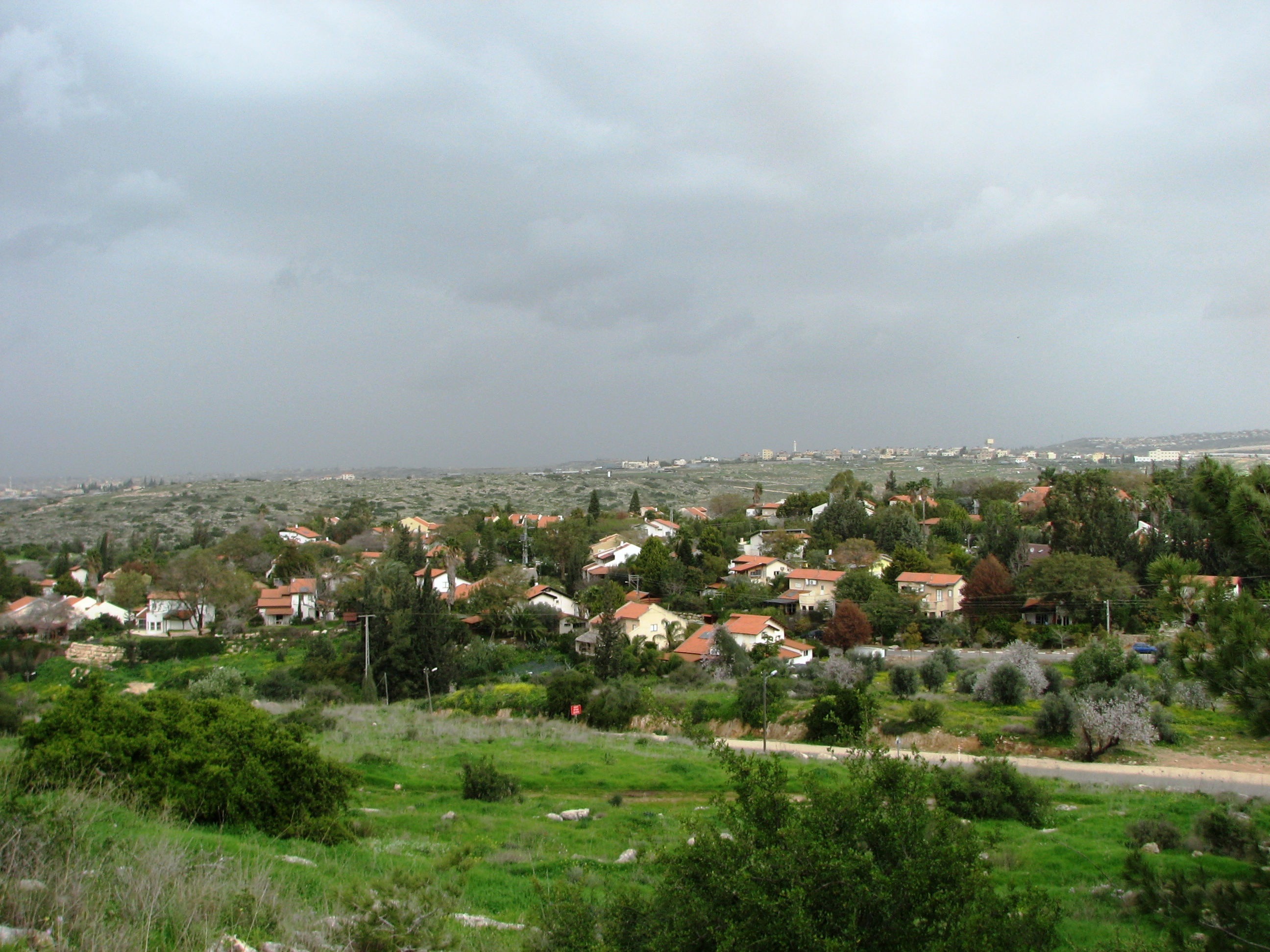
- Etymology: Ridolfia segetum
- Location within Central Israel Location within Israel
- Coordinates: 32°8′38″N 34°58′59″E
- Country: Israel
- District: Central
- Subdistrict: Petah Tikva
- Council: Drom HaSharon
- Affiliation: HaMerkaz HaHakla'i
- Founded: 1982
- Population (2024): 1,016
- Website: http://www.nirit.org.il/

Nirit (Hebrew: נִירִית) is a community settlement in central Israel. Located near Matan and the Horshim forest, it falls under the jurisdiction of Drom HaSharon Regional Council. In 2024 it had a population of 1,016.

== Etymology ==
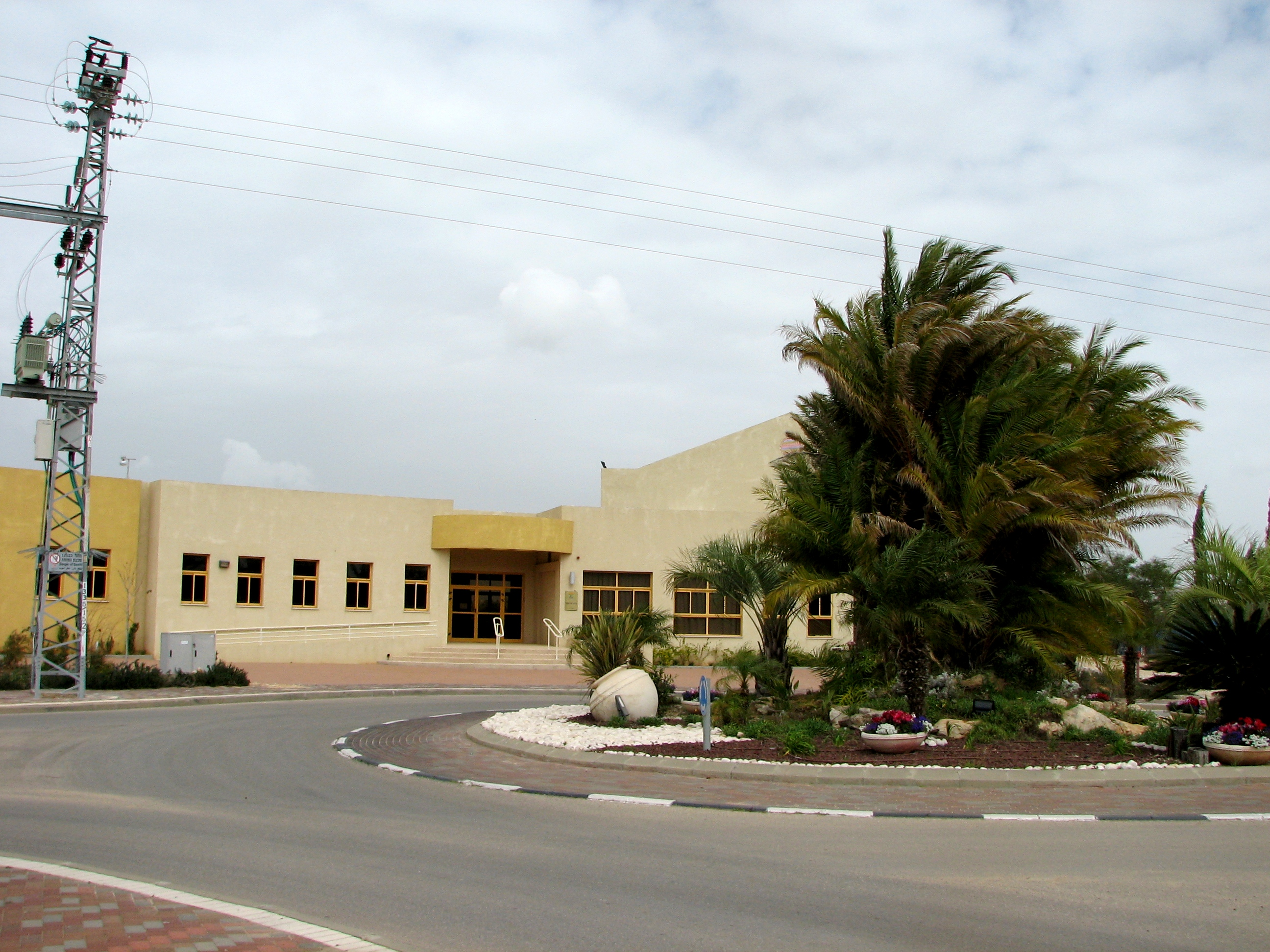
Nirit community center

Nirit was founded on January 19, 1982 and was named after an indigenous plant, Ridolfia segetum, growing nearby. It expanded twice, once in 1986–1988 and again in 2000. Until 1986 there were only 15 families in temporary buildings, and nowadays it grew to about 240 families. In 2005 a new neighborhood named Nof HaSharon was built adjacent to Nirit. This neighborhood is located just outside (east of) the Green Line, actually belongs to the settlement Alfei Menashe, but in practice it is mostly merged with Nirit.

The community is managed by elected committees, whose members are volunteers.

The communal character of Nirit is expressed by an active cultural life, events, and close ties between the residents.

== Notable residents ==
- Tamir Pardo (born 1953), former Director of the Mossad
