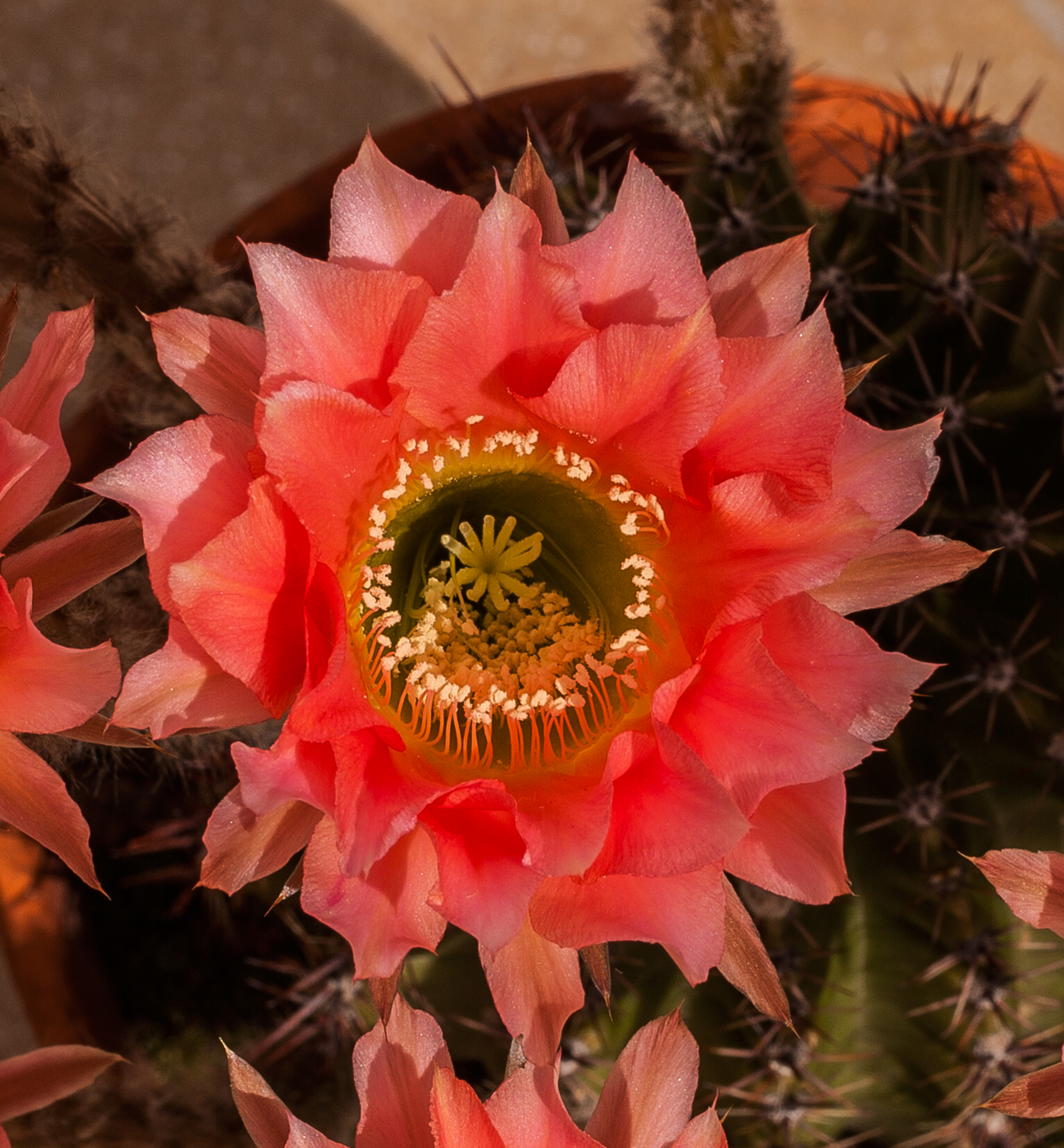

Conservation status
- Least Concern (IUCN 3.1)

Scientific classification
- Kingdom: Plantae
- Clade: Tracheophytes
- Clade: Angiosperms
- Clade: Eudicots
- Order: Caryophyllales
- Family: Cactaceae
- Subfamily: Cactoideae
- Genus: Echinopsis
- Species: E. pentlandii

Binomial name
- Echinopsis pentlandii (Hook.) Salm-Dyck ex A.Dietr.

Synonyms
- List: Cereus pentlandii (Hook.) J.F.Cels; Cereus pentlandii var. alboviolaceus J.F.Cels; Cereus pentlandii var. aurantiacominiatus J.F.Cels; Cereus pentlandii var. aurantiacus J.F.Cels; Cereus pentlandii var. calendulaceus J.F.Cels; Cereus pentlandii var. carmineus J.F.Cels; Cereus pentlandii var. carneoviolaceus J.F.Cels; Cereus pentlandii var. carneoviolaceus J.F.Cels; Cereus pentlandii var. carneus J.F.Cels; Cereus pentlandii var. carneus-marginatus J.F.Cels; Cereus pentlandii var. coccineus-novus J.F.Cels; Cereus pentlandii var. crocatus J.F.Cels; Cereus pentlandii var. crocinomiltus J.F.Cels; Cereus pentlandii var. dolichacanthus J.F.Cels; Cereus pentlandii var. elegans J.F.Cels; Cereus pentlandii var. elegans-vittatus J.F.Cels; Cereus pentlandii var. flammeoviolaceus J.F.Cels; Cereus pentlandii var. flammeus J.F.Cels; Cereus pentlandii var. floribundus-sanguineus J.F.Cels; Cereus pentlandii var. janthinus J.F.Cels; Cereus pentlandii var. laevior J.F.Cels; Cereus pentlandii var. lateritius J.F.Cels; Cereus pentlandii var. lilacinus J.F.Cels; Cereus pentlandii var. lilacinus-superbus J.F.Cels; Cereus pentlandii var. longispinus J.F.Cels; Cereus pentlandii var. luteoflammeus J.F.Cels; Cereus pentlandii var. luteoviolaceus J.F.Cels; Cereus pentlandii var. marginatus J.F.Cels; Cereus pentlandii var. maximilianus J.F.Cels; Cereus pentlandii var. miniatocarmineus J.F.Cels; Cereus pentlandii var. miniatoroseus J.F.Cels; Cereus pentlandii var. miniatus J.F.Cels; Cereus pentlandii var. pulchellus J.F.Cels; Cereus pentlandii var. puniceus J.F.Cels; Cereus pentlandii var. pyracanthus J.F.Cels; Cereus pentlandii var. rhodanthus J.F.Cels; Cereus pentlandii var. rhodianthinus J.F.Cels; Cereus pentlandii var. rosaceus J.F.Cels; Cereus pentlandii var. roseocarneus J.F.Cels; Cereus pentlandii var. roseovenosus J.F.Cels; Cereus pentlandii var. roseovinosus J.F.Cels; Cereus pentlandii var. roseus J.F.Cels; Cereus pentlandii var. salmineoviolaceus J.F.Cels; Cereus pentlandii var. salmoneus J.F.Cels; Cereus pentlandii var. salmoneus J.F.Cels; Cereus pentlandii var. sanguineus J.F.Cels; Cereus pentlandii var. sanguineus J.F.Cels; Cereus pentlandii var. scheeri J.F.Cels; Cereus pentlandii var. subflavus J.F.Cels; Cereus pentlandii var. tardivus J.F.Cels; Cereus pentlandii var. vinosus J.F.Cels; Cereus pentlandii var. violaceomutabilis J.F.Cels; Cereus pentlandii var. violaceoroseus J.F.Cels; Cereus pentlandii var. violaceus J.F.Cels; Cereus pentlandii var. violaceus J.F.Cels; Cereus pentlandii var. vitellinus J.F.Cels; Echinocactus pentlandii Hook.; Echinocereus pentlandii (Hook.) K.Schum.; Echinopsis hardeniana Boed.; Echinopsis pentlandii var. achatina Fernald; Echinopsis pentlandii var. albiflora Weidlich; Echinopsis pentlandii var. cavendishii Rümpler; Echinopsis pentlandii var. gracilispina Lem.; Echinopsis pentlandii subsp. hardeniana (Boed. ex Backeb. & F.M.Knuth) G.Navarro; Echinopsis pentlandii var. integra Rud.Mey.; Echinopsis pentlandii var. laevior Monv. ex Labour.; Echinopsis pentlandii subsp. larae (Cárdenas) G.Navarro; Echinopsis pentlandii var. longispina Rümpler; Echinopsis pentlandii var. maximiliana Heyder; Echinopsis pentlandii var. neuberti Rümpler; Echinopsis pentlandii var. ochroleuca Rud.Mey.; Echinopsis pentlandii var. tuberculata (Niedt) Schelle; Echinopsis pentlandii var. vitellina Hildm. ex K.Schum.; Echinopsis scheeri Salm-Dyck; Echinopsis tuberculata Niedt; Lobivia aculeata Buining; Lobivia argentea Backeb.; Lobivia aurantiaca Backeb.; Lobivia backebergii var. larae (Cárdenas) Rausch; Lobivia boliviensis Britton & Rose; Lobivia boliviensis var. croceantha Y.Itô; Lobivia boliviensis var. rubriflora Y.Itô; Lobivia boliviensis var. violaciflora Y.Itô; Lobivia brunneorosea Backeb.; Lobivia hardeniana Boed. ex Backeb. & F.M.Knuth; Lobivia higginsiana Backeb.; Lobivia higginsiana var. carnea Y.Itô; Lobivia johnsoniana Backeb.; Lobivia larae Cárdenas; Lobivia lauramarca Rauh & Backeb.; Lobivia leucorhodon Backeb.; Lobivia leucoviolacea Backeb.; Lobivia maximiliana var. lauramarca (Rauh & Backeb.) J.Ullmann; Lobivia multicostata Backeb.; Lobivia omasuyana Cárdenas; Lobivia pampana var. borealis Rausch; Lobivia pentlandii (Hook.) Britton & Rose; Lobivia pentlandii var. hardeniana (Boed. ex Backeb. & F.M.Knuth) Rausch; Lobivia pentlandii var. larae (Cárdenas) Rausch; Lobivia pentlandii var. longispina Rümpler; Lobivia raphidacantha Backeb.; Lobivia rossii var. hardeniana (Boed.) Backeb.; Lobivia scheeri (Salm-Dyck) Rausch; Lobivia scheeri var. borealis (Rausch) Rausch; Lobivia schneideriana Backeb.; Lobivia schneideriana var. carnea Backeb.; Lobivia schneideriana var. cuprea Backeb.; Lobivia titicacensis Cárdenas; Lobivia varians Backeb.; Lobivia varians var. croceantha Backeb.; Lobivia varians var. rubroalba Backeb.; Lobivia wegheiana Backeb.

= Echinopsis pentlandii =

Species of cactus

Echinopsis pentlandii, synonyms including Lobivia pentlandii, is a species of Echinopsis found in Bolivia and Peru.

== Description ==
Echinopsis pentlandii usually grows in groups with spherical to ovoid, bright green and often glaucous shoots that reach a diameter of up to around 12 centimeters. The shoot apex is often sunken. There are twelve to 15 high ribs that are deeply notched and divided into long, hatchet-shaped, sharp-edged cusps. The areoles on it are about 2 centimeters apart. Variable thorns emerge from them. The single central spine, which can also be missing, is 3 to 9 centimeters long. The backward curved 5 to 15 marginal spines are yellowish brown and are up to 3 centimeters long.

The short, funnel-shaped flowers open during the day and are variable in flower color. It ranges from slightly purple-pink to red, orange or yellow. The flower throat is often lighter. The flowers are 4 to 6 centimeters long. Its very strong flower tube reaches a diameter of up to 1 centimeter. The spherical, juicy, sticky fruits have a diameter of 1 to 1.2 centimeters.

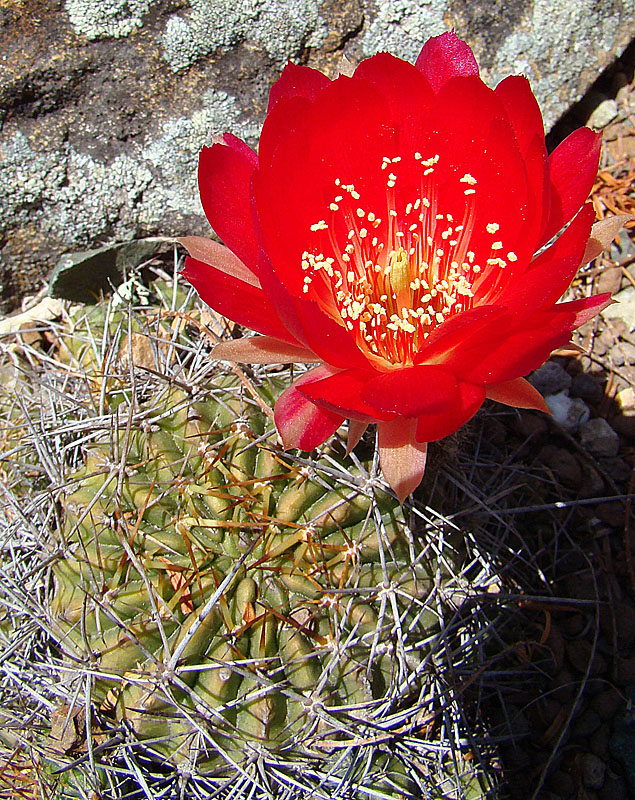

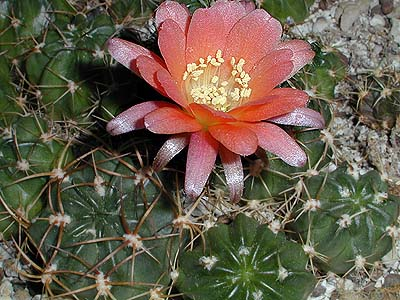

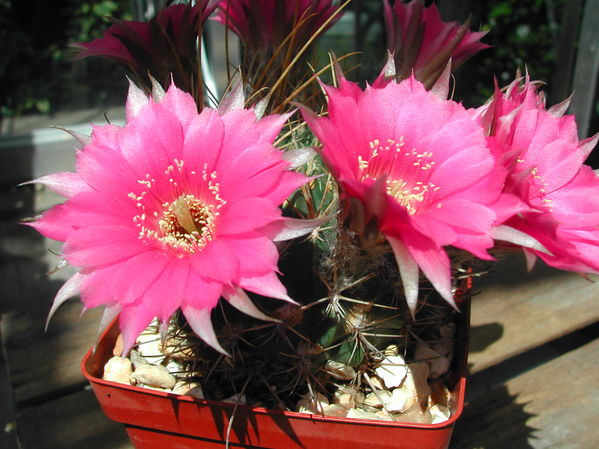

== Taxonomy ==
The species was first described by William Jackson Hooker in 1844 as Echinocactus pentlandii. The specific epithet pentlandii honors the Irish geographer and naturalist Joseph Barclay Pentland. In 1846, the species was transferred to the genus Echinopsis. In 1922, Nathaniel Lord Britton and Joseph Nelson Rose placed the species in the genus Lobivia. As of November 2025, Plants of the World Online restored the species to Echinopsis. The species has many other synonyms, including a large number of varieties not accepted by Plants of the World Online.

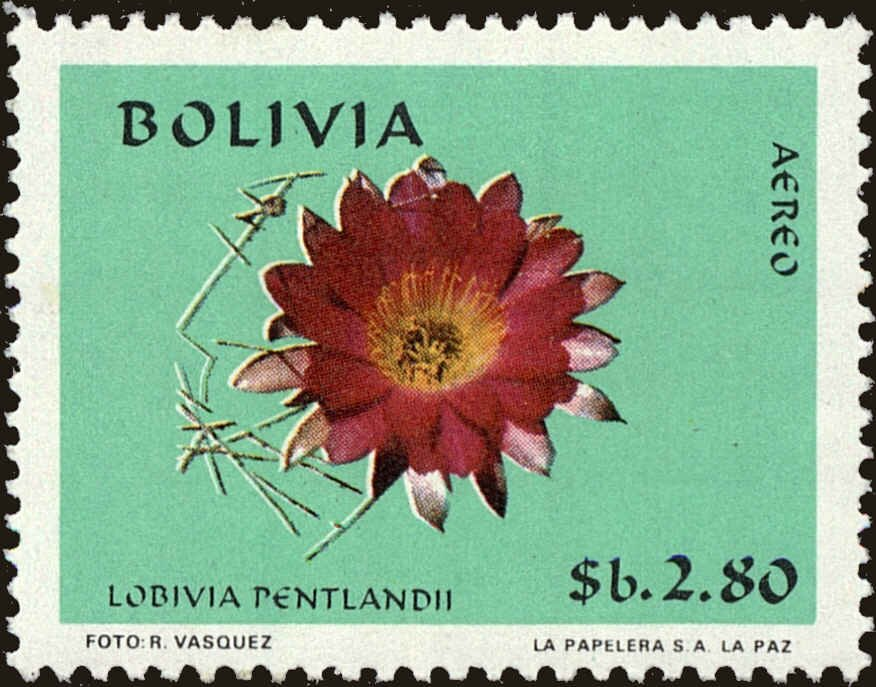
Bolivian stamp

== Distribution ==
Echinopsis pentlandii is widespread in the Peruvian regions of Cusco and Puno and the Bolivian departments of La Paz, Oruro, Cochabamba and Potosí in the high altitudes of the Andes.
