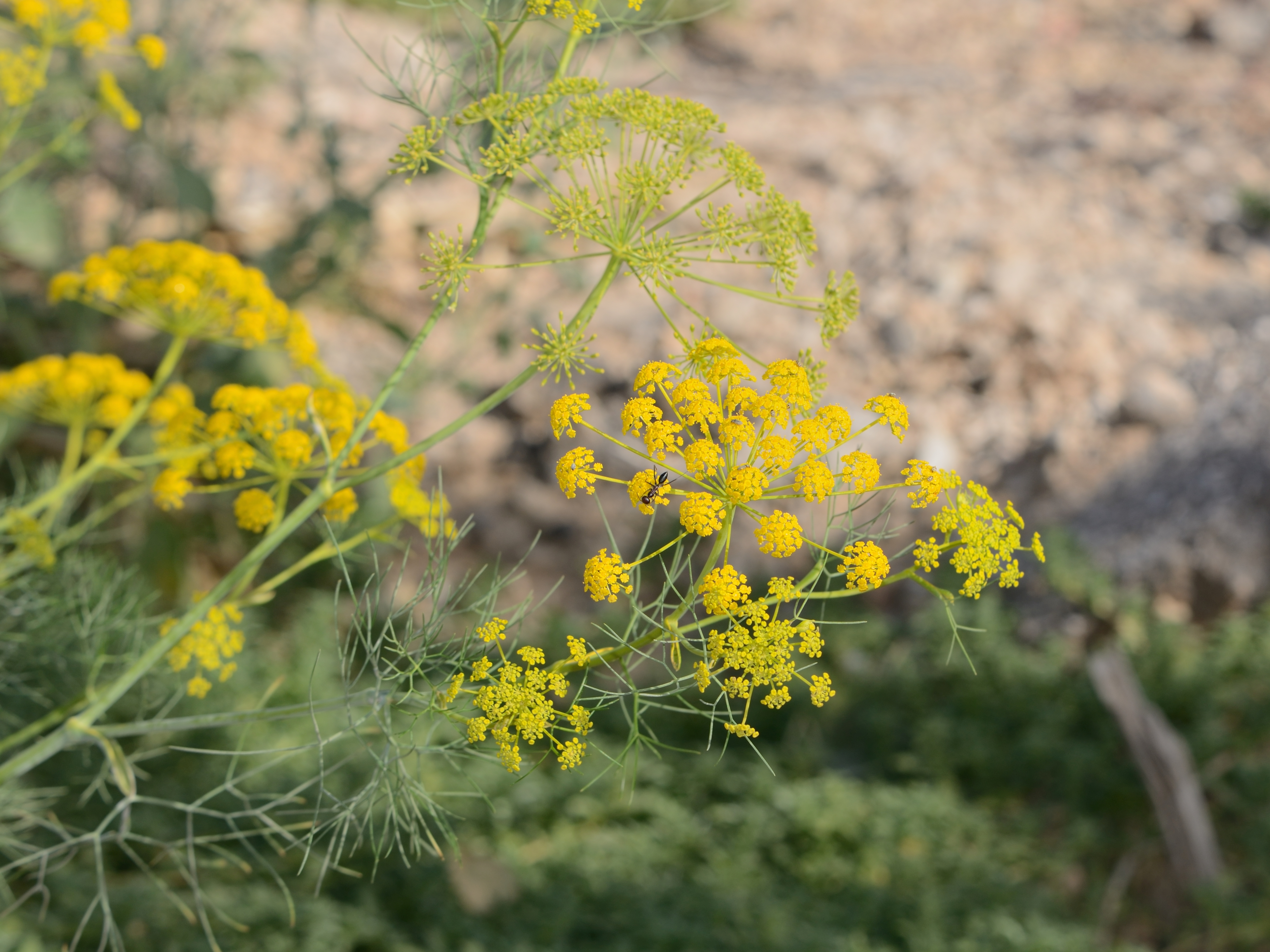
- Ridolfia segetum

Scientific classification
- Kingdom: Plantae
- Clade: Tracheophytes
- Clade: Angiosperms
- Clade: Eudicots
- Clade: Asterids
- Order: Apiales
- Family: Apiaceae
- Subfamily: Apioideae
- Tribe: Apieae
- Genus: Ridolfia; Moris
- Species: R. segetum

Binomial name
- Ridolfia segetum (L.) Moris

= Ridolfia =

Genus of flowering plants

Ridolfia segetum, called false fennel, corn parsley, or false caraway, is an annual weed of the Mediterranean region. Its height is 40–100 centimetres (16–39 in). The stem is erect, striate, and branched. The glabrous leaves are finely divided several times with filiform leaflets. The upper leaves frequently reduced and the base of the petiole enlarged. The flowers are yellow, arranged in small umbels with almost uniform rays (10–60).

The seeds and leaves contain an essential oil and the plant has a strong odor. The essential oil contains the chemicals α-phellandrene, α-terpinolene, β-phellandrene, and dillapiol.

The leaves can be eaten in its raw form or cooked, and are used as an herb in the pickle industry.
