= Kidnapping of Naama Levy =

Israeli hostage taken by Hamas in 2023

- Part of the Gaza war hostage crisis
- A still image from bodycam video taken by Hamas during Levy's kidnapping
- Location: 31°28′21″N 34°29′50″E; Nahal Oz, Southern District, Israel
- Date: October 7, 2023 – January 25, 2025
- Attack type: Kidnapping
- Perpetrator: Hamas

Naama Levy (Hebrew: נעמה לוי; born 22 June 2004) is an Israeli woman who was serving in the Israel Defense Forces (IDF) when she was abducted from the IDF surveillance base at Nahal Oz near the Gaza–Israel barrier on the morning of 7 October 2023, during the Hamas-led attack on Israel.

Later that day, Hamas released footage on social media showing Levy in the Gaza Strip, hands tied behind her back, as armed militants dragged her from the trunk of a Jeep and forced her inside the vehicle. One of the first viral videos of the Gaza war, the footage showed Levy with multiple visible injuries and a large bloodstain on the seat of her gray sweatpants, which gave rise to widespread speculation that she had been sexually abused. Images from the footage came to symbolize sexual and gender based violence against Israeli women during the attacks.

On 22 May 2024, the Hostages and Missing Families Forum released footage compiled from Hamas militants' bodycams, showing Levy and other female soldiers being held captive at the surveillance base on the morning of 7 October. The families approved the release of the footage partly to pressure the Israeli government to resume hostage negotiations with Hamas.

On 25 January 2025, Levy and three other female soldiers, who had served and been abducted with her, were released as part of the 2025 Gaza war ceasefire, after spending 477 days in captivity.

== Biography ==
Born in Israel on 22 June 2004, Levy was raised in India where she attended an American school. She has three siblings. Her mother, Ayelet Levy Shachar, is a doctor with the Israeli women's national football team. Levy is a triathlete and an alumna of Hands of Peace, which promotes peace among Israeli and Palestinian youth. She also volunteered for organizations including the Red Cross and the UN. At the time of the 7 October attacks, she had just begun her service in the Israel Defense Forces.

== Abduction ==
During the 7 October attacks, Levy was acting as an IDF observer in the Nahal Oz kibbutz military base, which was attacked by Hamas militants. Levy's last communication with her family was at 6:55 a.m. when she texted her mother confirming she was in a safe room. Further messages sent to Levy 20 to 30 minutes later went unanswered.

Footage posted by Hamas later that day (according to Reuters), and widely circulated online, showed Levy in the Gaza Strip, barefoot, bruised, and cut, with her hands tied behind her back, and wounds on her ankles. She was filmed being taken from the trunk of a Jeep and pushed into the interior of the vehicle by armed militants while bystanders chanted "God is Great" in Arabic (Arabic: الله أكبر). Her mother, who did not see the video until at least a day after the attack, stated that she was unsure the disheveled and bloody woman in the video was her daughter. However, Levy's father confirmed the footage was of Naama Levy.

Images from the initial video of Levy's abduction came to symbolize Sexual and gender-based violence in the October 7 attacks. Feminist activists in cities including London and São Paulo dressed in bloodied sweatpants like those worn by Levy in the footage.

On 22 May 2024, the Hostages and Missing Families Forum released around three minutes of footage from Hamas militants' bodycams on the morning of 7 October. The video shows the militants taking Levy and other female soldiers hostage at Nahal Oz. Several of the women, including Levy, are seen with bloodied faces. The hostages' families approved the release of the video to show how the women were treated and to pressure the Israeli government to resume hostage negotiations. In the video, Levy pleads with the militants in English, saying: "I have friends in Palestine." The Israeli prime minister Benjamin Netanyahu stated he was "shocked" by the footage and promised to do everything possible to bring the remaining hostages home.

On 16 July 2024, in a further bid to renew pressure for a hostage deal, Levy's family approved the release of a photo from the early days of her captivity, showing her with a black eye and a swollen face.

== Captivity ==
Levy publicly spoke about her captivity in September 2025, eight months after her release. She said that she suffered severe malnutrition, indescribable hunger, and had many untreated injuries. She described the conditions as unbearable and unsanitary, and said that she was in constant fear that each moment could be her last. She said that the time she spent as a hostage "will remain carved into [her] body and soul for the rest of [her] life."

== Efforts to secure Levy's release ==
Israelis taking Naama Levy's cause

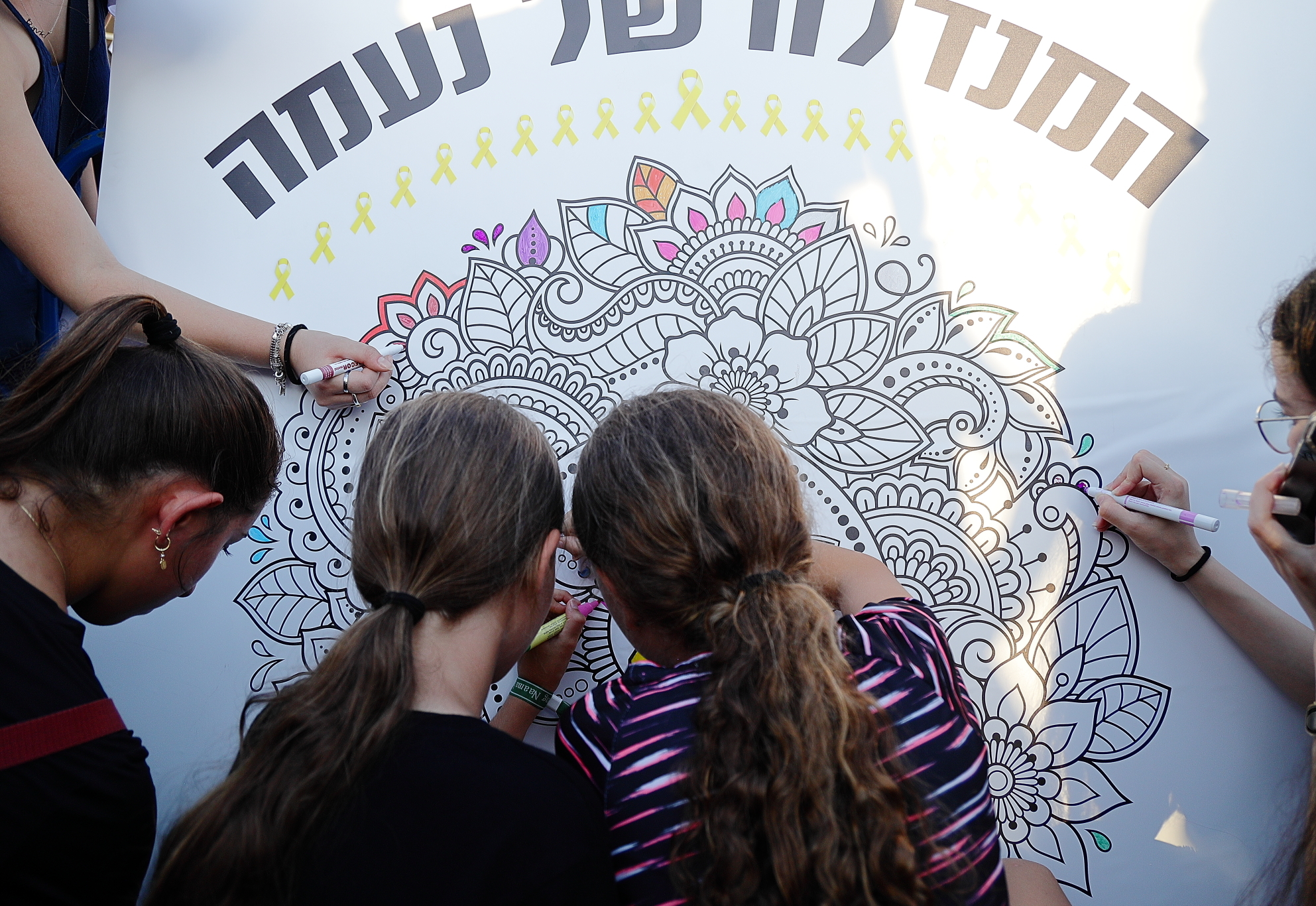
Israeli children coloring a mandala in Hostages Square in Tel Aviv to commemorate Levy's 20th birthday. According to released hostages Levy drew mandalas in captivity

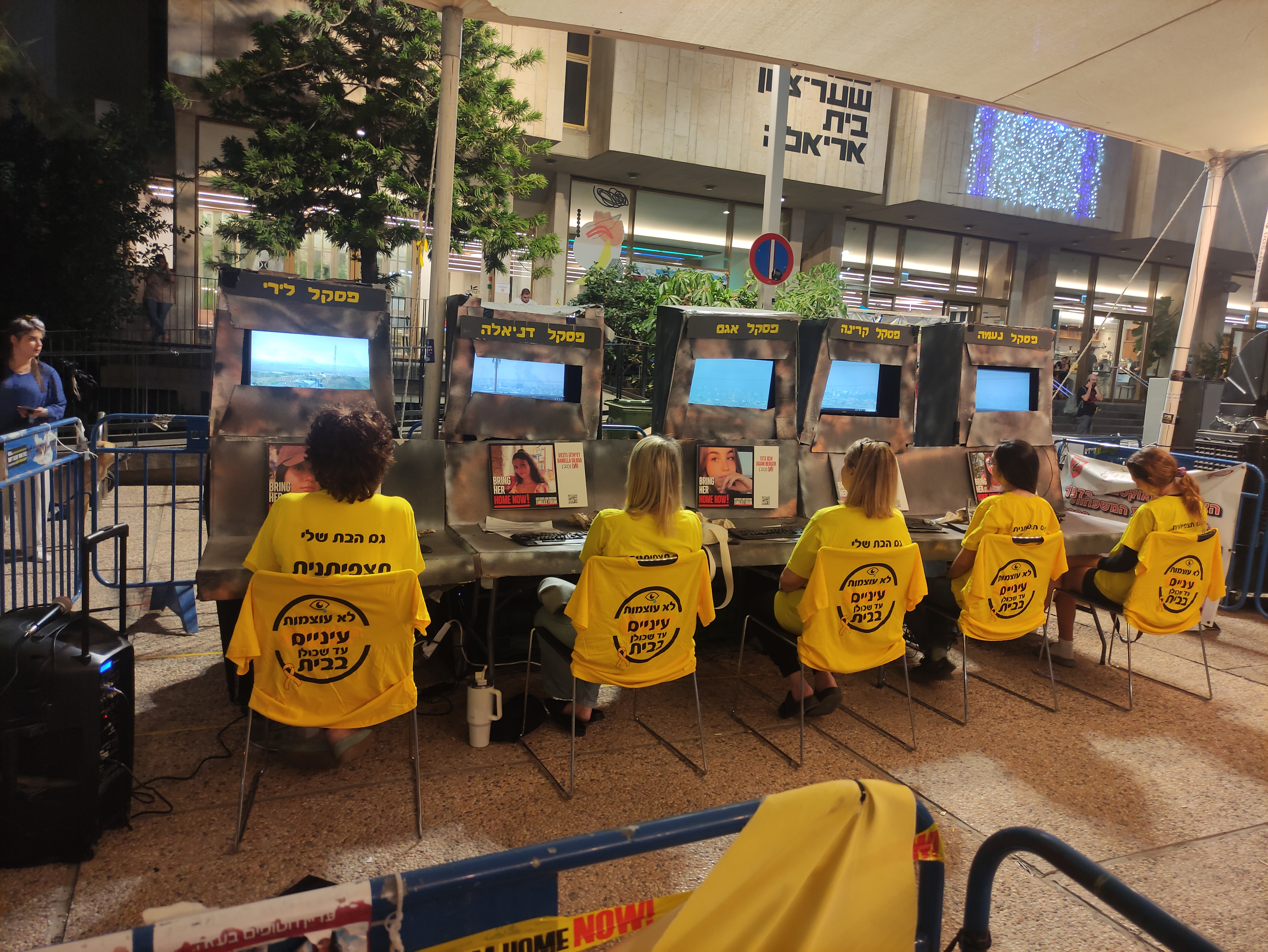
A protest at Hostage Square recreating the event in which 16 IDF observers were killed and the five (including Levy) were kidnapped.

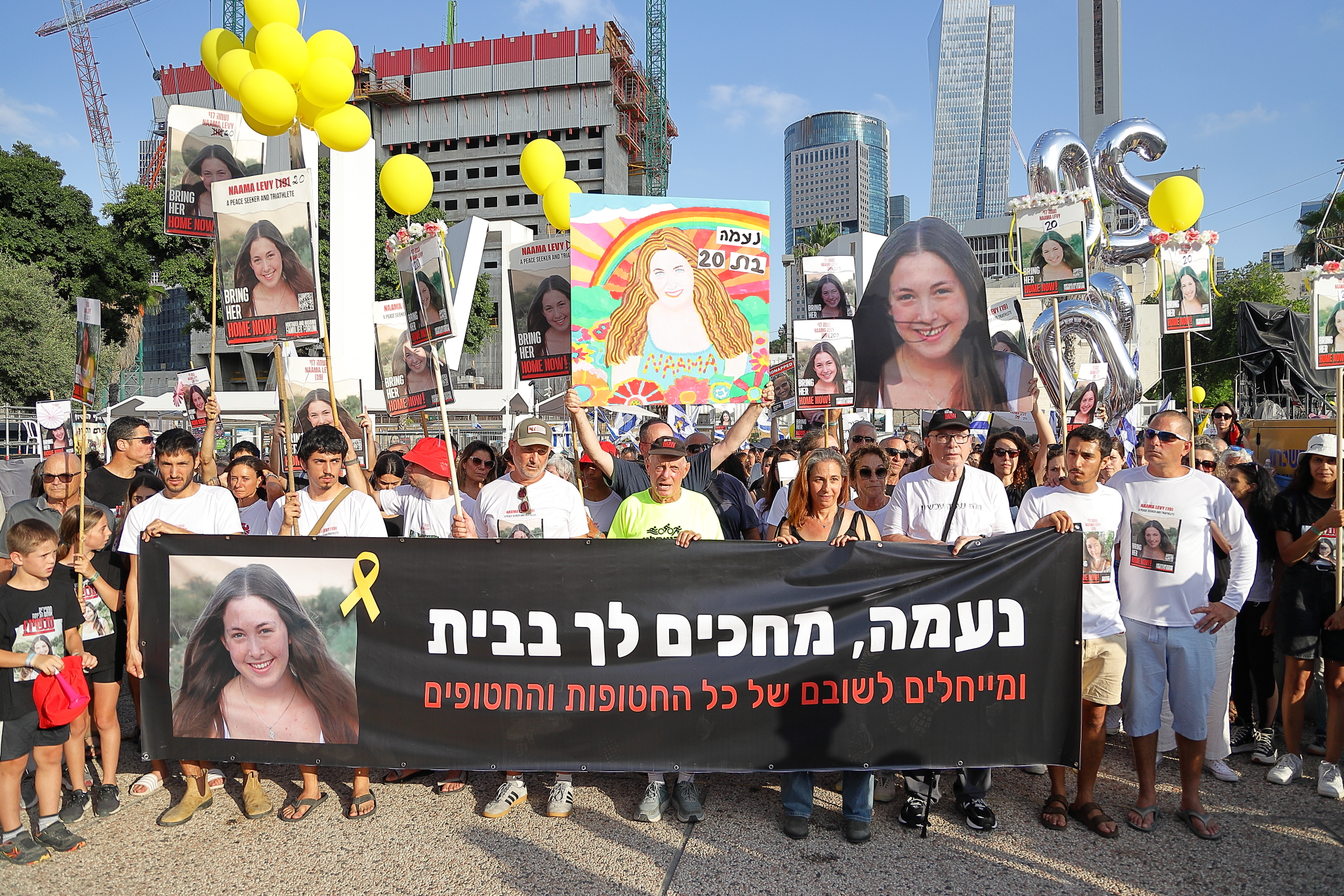
Protest march on Levy's 20th birthday that ended at Hostages Square (Note: Translation of banner: Top row:Naama, we are waiting for you at home. Bottom row: Also wishing for the return of all the hostages.)

In a December 2023 interview with the Israeli channel i24 News, her father Yoni Levy requested the assistance of international organizations. He stated that while Levy had volunteered for and worked with organizations such as the Red Cross, the UN, and women's organizations, those organizations had not intervened on behalf of Levy and other female hostages. He expressed outrage at the perceived silence of Michelle Obama, who had previously campaigned for the release of the kidnapped Chibok schoolgirls, over her silence concerning the abduction of Levy and other women.

On International Women's Day in 2024, her mother Ayelet Levy Shachar spoke at the Israel Hayom gala in Tel Aviv. She reminded attendees that her daughter and other female hostages were still being held in Gaza as of March 2024. Levy Shachar also wrote an op-ed criticizing international organizations and women's groups for not acknowledging or condemning sexual violence committed during the 7 October attacks. Another opinion piece about Levy and her abduction and status as a hostage was written by Levy Shachar and published in February 2024.

In March 2024, her brother Amit Levy shared her story during a meeting with the United Kingdom All-Party Parliamentary Group, led by MPs Stephen Crabb and Margaret Hodge, organized in partnership with the Hostages and Missing Families Forum. Family members of other hostages also told their stories. The hashtag "#METOOUNLESSYOURAJEW" has become associated with Jewish women who are or have been held captive and reported to have endured sexual violence due to the 7 October 2023 attacks.

It was reported at the end of March 2024 by Levy Shachar that some hostages who were released during the November 2023 cease fire and resulting prisoner exchange that they had come into contact with Levy and while she had been wounded in the legs, she was walking and talking under her own power. Her comments came before a meeting with Netanyahu and other family members of the remaining female IDF soldiers still held by Hamas, where she expected to push for negotiations about a potential hostage deal.

In April 2024, her aunt and others protested near the Knesset to bring attention to the plight of the remaining hostages including Levy, and stated that the most urgent issue was to bring the hostages home.

== Release ==
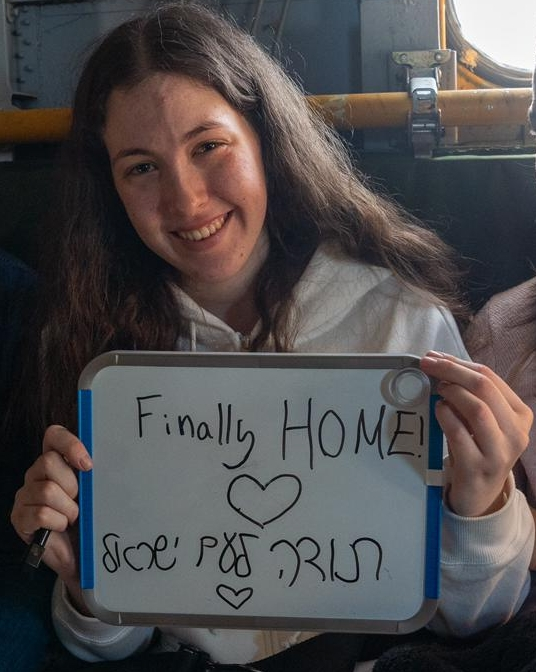
Naama Levy on the helicopter after being released, thanking the Israeli people

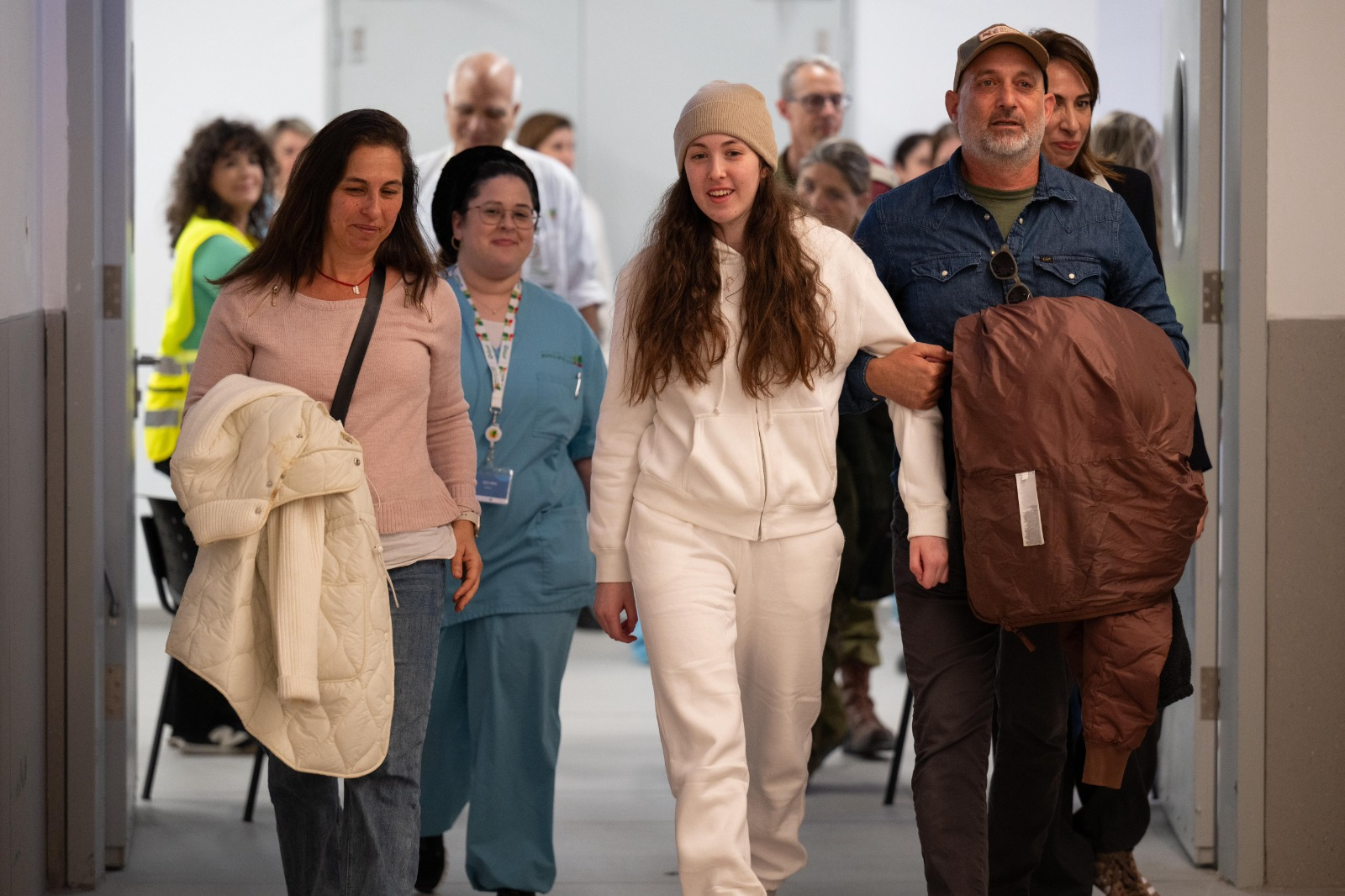
Naama Levy, flanked by her parents, following her release on January 25, 2025.

On 24 January 2025, Hamas announced that Levy and three other female IDF soldiers would be released the next day as part of the hostage exchange during the ceasefire. For each female soldier released by Hamas, Israel agreed to release 50 Palestinian prisoners it held, of whom 30 were serving life sentences.

On 25 January, Levy and fellow IDF observers Liri Albag, Karina Ariev, and Daniella Gilboa were handed over by Hamas to the Red Cross in Palestine Square in Gaza. The handover occurred after a ceremony in which Hamas dressed the four hostages in military fatigues and brought them on a stage. Shortly after the handover, the former hostages were transferred to the IDF by the Red Cross and reunited with their families in Israel.

In a public social media post a few days after her release, Levy offered thanks to IDF soldiers and Israeli civilians stating that during her captivity she was able to see them fighting for her. While she had been reportedly alone for the first 50 days of captivity, she said that she was later held with other IDF observers and they had supported one another during captivity and since release.

Following her release, it was reported that Levy and other members of her all-female IDF observer unit had documented, prior to being taken hostage, unusual practice raids and drills by Hamas taking place on the Gaza side of the border fence. Their warnings were ignored by officials within Israel.

Levy, along with the other freed female soldiers, enrolled in a group therapy program. She completed the intensive portion of the program on 20 August 2025. The former hostages then continued with an individual therapy program and less intensive group therapy.

== Post-release activities ==
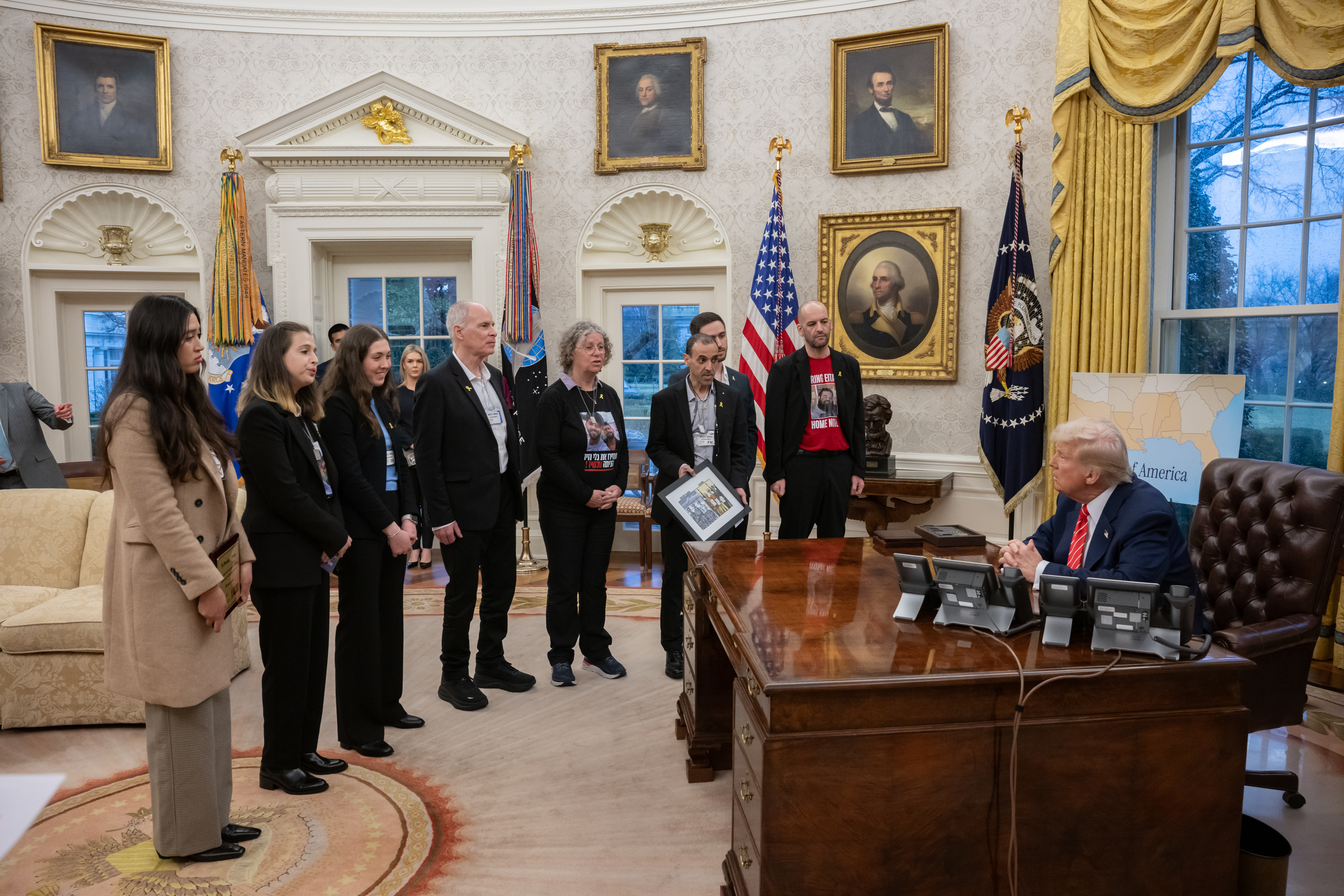
Naama Levy (third from left) and other former hostages meeting with President Donald Trump in the Oval Office, March 2025.

In February 2025, Levy and three fellow freed observers met outgoing IDF chief of staff Herzi Halevi, who apologized to them for not taking the observers' warnings seriously before the 7 October attack, and in April she met the new IDF chief of staff Eyal Zamir, who she presented with a Passover Haggadah.

In early March 2025, Levy was part of a delegation of former hostages who travelled to Washington to meet U.S. President Donald Trump to urge him to continue efforts for the release of the remaining hostages.

On 13 May 2025, after reports surfaced that Mohammed Sinwar had been killed in an airstrike, Levy participated in a 39 second video uploaded to social media in which she, along with fellow observers and former hostages Karina Ariev and Daniella Gilboa, are mouthing the words to an Arabic song being played in the background.

Since her release, Levy has participated at multiple protests in Hostages Square in Tel Aviv to promote a ceasefire agreement to release the rest of the hostages still held by Hamas. At an 28 April protest, Levy and other former hostages pleaded for Trump to do his utmost to free the remaining hostages. At a 24 May protest, Levy described her conditions in captivity. She said that at times she had to survive on rain water. She also told of the fear of air strikes, which in one instance had caused the building she had been held in to partially collapse.

Levy and former hostages Liri Albag, Doron Steinbrecher, Moran Stella Yanai, and Ilana Gritzewsky met actress Gal Gadot in July 2025, to whom they narrated their experiences in captivity, urging her to keep advocating for the release of the remaining hostages. On 25 July, Levy, along with Albag, Ariev, and Gilboa, published a video marking six months since their release. In the video, they urge the Israeli public and the international community to "do everything" for the return of the remaining hostages, in light of the standstill in the talks on a ceasefire and hostage deal between Israel and Hamas.

On 14 August, Levy, along with five other former hostages, appeared in a video released by the Hostages and Missing Families Forum to denounce the risk posed to the remaining hostages by Netanyahu's announced plan to fully occupy Gaza City. They called on Trump to help broker a ceasefire deal to release the remaining hostages.

On 19 September, Levy, along with the parents of a hostage still held in Gaza, attended an event sponsored by the Hostage Aid Worldwide, a few days ahead of the general debate of the eightieth session of the United Nations General Assembly. Levy addressed United Nations diplomats and urged them to use diplomacy and negotiations to free the remaining hostages.

== Retaliation by Israel ==
On 30 January 2025, the IDF claimed that Muhammad Abu Aseed, a member of Hamas' Shati Battalion who was seen dragging Levy in the video, had been killed in a drone strike in September 2024. This news was not made public until after the release of all the female soldiers. On 2 September 2025, the IDF stated it had killed senior Hamas operative Hazem Awni Naeem, who had held Levy along with hostages Romi Gonen and Emily Damari in Gaza.

== See also ==
- List of Gaza war hostages
