= Matan, Israel =

Community settlement in central Israel

Matan: מתן (Hebrew)
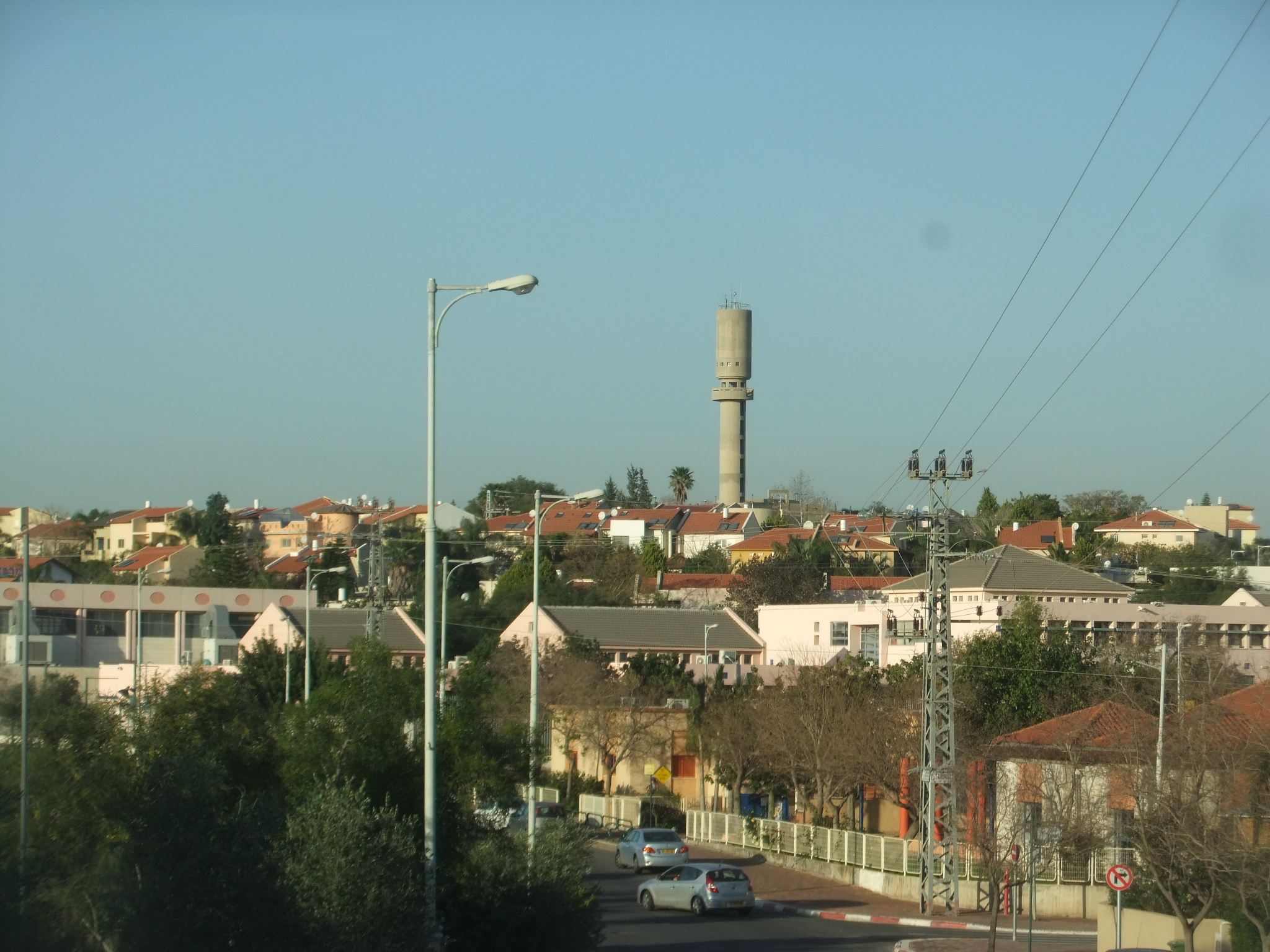

- Location within Central Israel
- Coordinates: 32°9′27″N 34°58′25″E
- Country: Israel
- District: Central
- Subdistrict: Petah Tikva
- Council: Drom HaSharon
- Founded: 1993
- Population (2024): 3,145
- Website: www.matan.muni.il

Matan (Hebrew: מתן, lit. 'Gift') is a community settlement in central Israel. Located near Yarhiv and Nirit, it falls under the jurisdiction of Drom HaSharon Regional Council. In 2024 it had a population of 3,145.

== History ==
The community was founded in 1993, and took its name from the Bible, specifically Proverbs 18:16:

A man's gift maketh room for him, and bringeth him before great men.

Its establishment was part of Minister of Housing and Construction Ariel Sharon's Seven Stars Plan to increase Jewish communities along the Green Line.

== Voting Patterns ==
In the 2026 election, 79 percent of voters in Matan voted for the parties of the center-left coalition led by Gadi Eisenkot, while 15 percent voted for the parties of the right-wing coalition led by Benjamin Netanyahu and 0.2 percent voted for the Arab parties. An additional 3.7 percent voted for the Reservists, and 1.6 percent voted for Amcha Yisrael. Voter turnout increased 11 percent from the 2022 election.

== Notable residents ==
- Yuval Diskin
