= Jane Bordeaux =

Israeli band

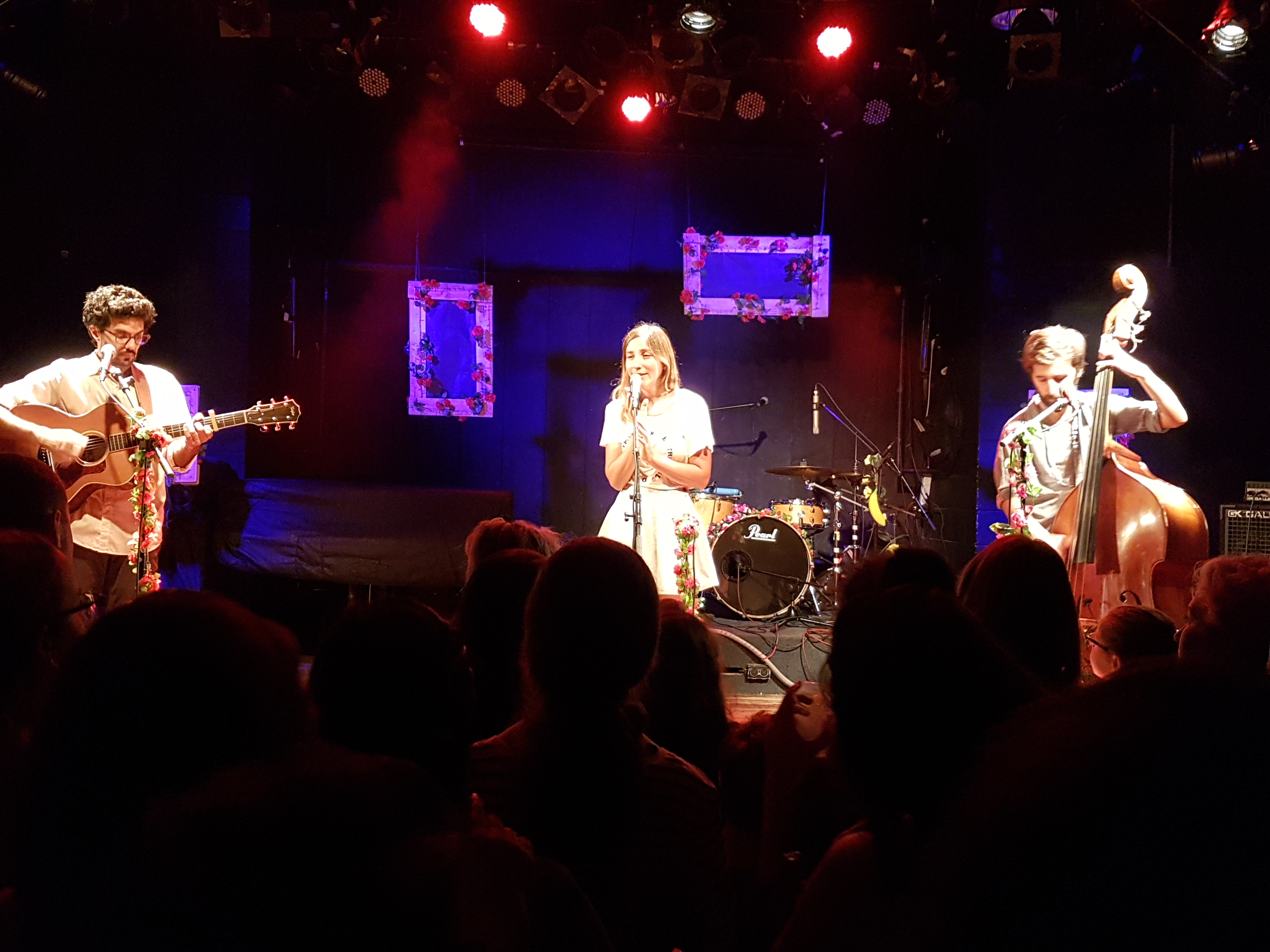
- Jane Bordeaux

Background information
- Origin: Israel
- Genres: Alternative rock; psychedelic rock; psychedelic pop; experimental rock; indie rock
- Years active: 2014–present
- Labels: Fearless; Equal Vision; Atlantic; Approaching AIRballoons
- Members: Doron Talmon; Mati Gilad; Yoav Arbel; Remi Osserwasser; Stav Achai

Jane Bordeaux (Hebrew: ג'יין בורדו) is an Israeli indie folk and country pop band formed in Tel Aviv in 2012. The group is known for its vintage inspired sound. The band consists of lead vocalist Doron Talmon, bassist Mati Gilad, drummer Yoav Arbel, guitarist Rami Osserwasser, and keyboardist Stav Ahai.

== History ==
The band was initially formed by four members, including Doron Talmon and Mati Gilad, who met at the Rimon School of Music. Their early sound was characterized by a country rock style. The name "Jane Bordeaux" was inspired by the names of two horses owned by Talmon's sister. At some point, the other two band members dropped out, and just then Amir Zeevi returned from his music studies in New York and joined the duo. After Zeevi joined, the band members began playing only acoustic in their shows, due to technical limitations.

They continued with the acoustic format because, in their words, "it suddenly sounded good, the lyrics were better, and the arrangements still sounded complete," thus abandoning their rock style and focusing on folk-country. The acoustic format also helped them maintain their mobility.

On 20 August 2014, the band's debut single, "Einav", was released. About two months later, on 4 October, the band's self-titled debut album, "Jane Bordeaux", was released, funded through a project on the Headstart website. On 20 November of that year, the album's second single, "How Can We Not?", was released. The song became a major hit in Israel, topping the Media Forest airplay chart on Galgalatz radio. In the annual Galgalatz Hebrew hymn parade, the song ranked tenth.

This led to the band's success, after becoming a radio hit. In late 2015, data was released indicating that the band had been the most played band at Galgalatz for the past year. On August 26, 2016, they received a gold album during a performance at the "Zappa Tel Aviv" club.

That same year, the band was parodied in the satirical TV show Eretz Nehederet, in a skit featuring a fictional band called "Kate Marlowe".

On December 15, 2018, the band released "Let Us Doze", the first single from their third album. On July 1, 2019, the band released another single, titled "Dancing Closely". And on August 1, 2019, the album "Oceans" was released. On January 24, 2022, the single "T-Shirt" was released. On September 14, the single "Holding My Heart" was released, featuring singer-songwriter DORJ.

On March 20, 2023, the single "I Don't Go Out to Parties" was released. On August 10, the single "The Water Tower" was released. This single peaked at number 12 on the MediaForest weekly chart.

On November 12 of that year, they released the single "Not Alone" during the War of the Iron Blades. The song peaked at number 14 on the MediaForest weekly chart. The band members stated that they were releasing the album in "a reality between realism and fantasy, contemporary reality and nostalgia. The band dedicated the album "to all the souls we have lost, who were killed, injured, kidnapped and captured and to all those who fell defending our country," referencing the war.

On March 13, 2024, they released the single "Polaroid," and on April 8, the single "Kishuf," both from their fifth album, "Kishuf," which was released on April 14.

== Members ==
=== Current members ===
- Doron Talmon – lead vocals, rhythm guitar
- Mati Gilad – lead guitar, vocals
- Yoav Arbel - battery
- Remi Osserwasser – electric guitar
- Stav Achai – keyboards

== Discography ==
=== Album ===
- 2014: ג'יין בורדו (Jane Bordeaux)
- 2017: מה שחשוב (What matters)
- 2019: אוקיינוסים (Oceans)
- 2020: שירים של אחרים (Songs of others)
- 2024: כישוף (Witchcraft)
