= Carlo Ernesto Liverati =

Italian painter

Carlo Ernesto Liverati (March 10, 1805 – October 27, 1844) was an Italian painter, mainly of genre and portraits. He was born in Austria to an Italian family but trained in England and Florence.

He was born in Vienna, Austria, to a music teacher from Bologna. His father moved to England to work in the household of the Duchess of Kent. Liverati's training as a young man occurred in England under Filippo Rheinehglie and Henry Perronet Briggs. In 1828, he travelled to Florence to visit his ill mother. After her death, he stayed to study at the Accademia di Belle Arti of Florence, where he frequently exhibited.

During the 1830s he mainly worked copying works from the Florentine collections for foreign families visiting or residing in Florence. He did paint a Christ points out his Mother to St John the Baptist commissioned by Prince Poniatowski for a church of Kiev. His genre scenes were influenced by the works of David Wilkie. He died of tuberculosis in 1844.
