= Frank Shifreen =

American painter

- Born: February 29, 1948; New London, Connecticut
- Education: Pratt Institute
- Known for: Painting, drawing, sculpture
- Movement: neo-expressionism, social sculpture

Frank Shifreen (born February 29, 1948) is an American artist, curator, and teacher. Shifreen played a significant part in the art movement of New York City in the early 1980s, organizing massive artist-run shows that brought thousands of people to Gowanus, Brooklyn. Since then, he has organized socially conscious art exhibitions across the United States and abroad, including From the Ashes, a massive exhibition organized in the aftermath of 9/11. A neo-expressionist and social sculptor, he is a graduate of the Pratt Institute and Adelphi University, he is currently finishing a doctorate in art and art education at the Teachers College at Columbia University.

== Early life ==
Shifreen was born in New London, Connecticut on February 29, 1948. He was raised in New York City, where he graduated with a Bachelor of Fine Arts degree from Pratt Institute in 1976.

== Artistic background ==
"Transfiguration of Pontiac" by Shifreen, 2008

Shifreen is a mixed-media artist who has worked in painting, sculpture, digital photography, live performance, landscape painting, and massive installations. His early inspiration included the work of the great abstract expressionists, such as Clyfford Still, Philip Guston, and Willem de Kooning.

Starting after he graduated in 1976, Shifreen began designing sets and props for various theater and dance companies in the United States and Europe. He began advertising his own solo exhibitions in 1976 with distinctive black-and-white posters plastered throughout New York City. He later used the same tactics to advertise the larger artist-organized events he helped found. His work has been a staple in underground shows and galleries on the Lower East Side, Manhattan and Brooklyn since the 1970s. By Winter of 2001, he had already had more than 40 shows of his painting and sculpture in the U.S. and Europe. He has performed at venues such as Club 57, Des Refusees, and the Boston Museum School. His work has appeared in the Brooklyn Museum, the Museum of Modern Art (MoMA), The City Museum of San Francisco, the Dallas Museum of Fine Arts, Vassar College, and the Gallerie di Collosseo in Italy.

== Teaching background ==
In 1993 began attending Adelphi University, graduating with a master's degree in Science and Education (specifically special education) in 1996. He started teaching homebound disabled students for the New York City Department of Education in September 1996. He began attending Columbia University in 2001, and he is currently finishing a doctorate in Art and Art Education at Teachers College, Columbia University. His specific area of study is artist organized initiatives and non-institutional art. His mentor is Dr. Graeme Sullivan, and his focus is on "art learning" in community settings.

== The Gowanus Memorial Artyard ==
=== The Monumental Show (1981) ===
In 1979 Shifreen began to have open-studio party shows at his Gowanus, Brooklyn studio, which was a nineteenth-century munitions factory at 230 3rd Street, next to the Gowanus Canal. There many artists began to network. Because his building was over 9,500 square feet, Shifreen asked his landlord to periodically use the un-rented space. Next to the property, on Smith and 5th Street in a "Public Site", there was five acres of abandoned lot to be used as an art space.

He and artists Michael Keene and George Moore decided to plan an artshow with "monumental" art, which a group of artists began assembling. Six months before the show, Shifreen began putting out posters to call for entries, and with a $1500 grant from the Brooklyn Council on the Arts and help from Gowanus Canal Community Development Corporation and Carroll Gardens Association, he and the organizers selected 150 artists out of the thousand proposals they received. The artists were each given a 20 by 20 foot space to create their art, which as "monumental" consisted of paintings, sculptures, mixed media, and anything one-and-a-half times normal size.

The participants included well-established artists such as Carl Andre and Andy Warhol-sponsored Keith Haring. The show opened on May 16, 1981, and more than 4000 people visited just that first weekend to see the art and hear live music. As a result of the show, Shifreen's landlord had him arrested for allegedly stealing electricity, and the ensuing controversy increased the press the show was already receiving. On June 8, 1981, New York Magazine did an article on the show entitled "Gowanus Guerrillas", calling it "the event of the season." On June 15, 1981, Shifreen made the cover of the New York Daily News.

=== Monument Redefined (1982) ===
After the success of the first, Shifren began organizing a second show with artist Scott Siken. Entitled The Monument Redefined, the 1982 show was held in three locations. The outdoor site covered twelve acres with artwork visible from the window of the Culver subway. The space for the two indoor sites was donated by the Downtown Brooklyn Cultural Center, while sponsors included the Department of Parks and Recreation, the Decentralization Program of the New York State Council on the Arts, The City of New York, Con Edison, the F.W. Woolworth Company, and the Organization of Independent Artists.

The stated theme of the exhibition was not size, but social responsibility. Thousands of artists again submitted entrees, and the co-curators selected 400 proposals, including works by well-known artists such as Carl Andre, Christo, Vito Acconci, Nancy Holt, the controversial Chris Burden, Dennis Oppenheim, Nancy Spero, Leon Golub, and Boaz Vaadia. Some of Shifreen's co-jurors were Marcia Tucker, the director of the New Museum, Henry Geldzahler, the New York City Cultural Commissioner, and Mary Boone, the gallery owner. As before, the show was a success, with multiple art publications publishing reviews. Three panel discussions were held at Cooper Union, and artists as well as art critics took part. On October 3, 1982, there was a review in The New York Times.

Several New York artists, including Shifreen and Julius Vitali, have theorized that the East Village, Manhattan art movement in the 1980s may have resulted partly from the artist-organized and not-for-profit shows of the early 1980s, including The Monumental Show and Monument Redefined. The shows made it possible for galleries and dealers to find and support emerging artists. From 1985 to 1986, Shifreen had five one-person shows as a result of these events, and became a successful grant writer.

== Career ==
=== 1983-1989 ===
In September 1983, he co-organized and exhibited in the Brooklyn Terminal Show with AAAArt committee. Held at the Brooklyn Navy Yard, over 550 artists assembled in what had previously been one of the largest buildings in the world.

Shifreen co-founded the Pan Aats group with Michael Curtin in 1984. For a time he served as editor of PanArts Magazine, which also served as a catalog for their Art and Ego show in 1984.

Shifreen helped organize the Art Against Apartheid exhibition in 1984, which was held at twenty six separate locations in New York. It was also coordinated by The Organization of Independent Artists, for whom Shifreen had written numerous grants.

He has been a member of Group Scud, a New York-based portable exhibition group, who park in front of New York museums and galleries to display work. The 22 Wooster Gallery gave him the paid position of Program Director for the Artists Talk on Art series, where he organized well-attended panels on diverse topics from 1986 to 1988.

From 1986 to 1989, he was involved with the international artists' organization Plexus, which created multicultural art environments. Some of these exhibitions traveled to Rome as well as other parts of Europe.

=== 2000-2005 ===
Crayon Show (2001)

In early 2001 he began working with crayon, curating a traveling exhibition that winter called the Crayon Show. It displayed at the Open Space Gallery in Allentown, Pennsylvania in June 2000.

Counting Coup (2001)

Shifreen found himself upset after the 2000 election of George W. Bush as President of the United States, and he put out a call to artists to hold the exhibit Counting Coup in response. Shifreen found listings of artists on the internet and sent over fifty emails. The Museum of New Art (MONA) in Detroit, Michigan had recently opened and was holding a beginning fundraiser, to which Shifreen donated some of his paintings. The director at the time, Jef Bourgeau, appreciated the donation and scheduled Counting Coup for exhibition at MONA. Shifreen co-curated the show with artist Scott Pfaffman, and it opened at the Scott Phaffman Gallery in New York City on January 21, 2001, the day after Bush officially became president. The show, which included artists Leon Golub and Barbara Kruger, traveled also to the Theater for a New City and the Center for Social Change in Northampton Massachusetts. However, the show attracted small crowds in some places, and the show ceased to travel when the events of 9/11 had cemented and legitimized George Bush's presidency.

From the Ashes (2001)

When 9/11 happened, Shifreen had been working on an art show called Witness. Shifreen, who lived less than a mile from the World Trade Center and saw the second plane go down, hurried to the site to volunteer, but was not allowed to help due to union rules about insurance. Shifreen then contacted Patricia Nicholson, a local activist and dancer, about using the CUANDO building gallery in Manhattan, which had been unoccupied but had non-profit status. He changed his show Witness, intended for October 1, to From the Ashes, and opened in the five-story building in the middle of October. The show included over 150 visual artists, 200 performing groups, and multiple video artists and site specific installations. There were five curators involved, including Willoughby Sharp. The show received press in publications such the Los Angeles Times, The Village Voice, and The Villager. As a result, $7000 were donated to the Fireman's Fund and five fire houses.

Ground Zero (2002)

Shifreen's "The Second Plane," digital image, 2002

New York City attempted to close the CUANDO building after From the Ashes, though the Museum of New Art (MONA) was contacted, and Frank Shifreen, Julius Vitali, and Daniel Scheffer opened a second show in July 2002 in the same building. Ground Zero was an exhibition of post-9/11 art featuring the work of over 50 artists. After the initial premiere in Detroit at MONA, the artist-organized show traveled around the country. Among the artists that exhibited are Amy Shapiro, Francoise Doherty and Robert Nielsen.

Art Against War (2003)

From June to August in 2003 he curated the exhibition Art Against War: Posters and Multimedia, which was displayed originally on the internet and also at nine galleries and museums in different places around the world. It collected artwork reflecting American war in Iraq. It was partly sponsored by the Drinkink Collective, a group of artists and scholars at Teachers College, and the New York Arts Magazine.

The show featured works on paper, digitally printed, painted or drawn, and had a strong multimedia component. Over 40 artists from the United States and 13 other countries displayed artwork protesting or analyzing the war in Iraq. The exhibit traveled to Social Forum IV in Mumbai, India. There the Majlis Cultural Center printed over 100 posters the size of giant advertising banners, of which 12 were Shifreen's work. In June 2003 it also displayed at the Macy Gallery at the Columbia University Teachers College and the university's Lubelski Gallery. He also exhibited at the E.H. Stone Gallery at Presbyterian College in Clinton, South Carolina. The show featured several of Shifreen's works, as well as work by Graeme Sullivian, Sherry Mayo, and David Garfinkel.

Artlot (2004–2005)

Along with sculptor Danny Scheffer, Shifreen spent a large amount of time between 2004 and 2005 adding sculpture to the Brooklyn Artlot in Boerum Hill, Brooklyn, an outdoor space with a thin narrow fenced area easily viewed by passerby.

=== 2008-present ===
Shifreen was a curator and artist for the exhibition Souped-up Pontiac at the Museum of New Art in Detroit, Michigan in May and June 2008. The show contained work from international and national artists, including a live-action "painting battle" between Shifreen and Dr. Barnaby Ruhe.

Shifreen was in a show in 2008 at Harvard University called Speech Acts: Art Responding Language, Rhetoric and Politics. His steel sculptures began as the collaboration with Danny Scheffer for the Brooklyn Artlot.

Shifreen and Gila Paris, organized a series of exhibitions in June 2009 along with Luxembroug group "cultureinside.com", the first one entitled ROOTED - the premiere.

In September and October 2009, Shifreen co-produced the A Bailout for the Rest of Us: Recession Art Sale in Manhattan with Elanit Kayne. It featured thirty artists and thirty out-of-work professional artists. Shifreen hosted the online gallery on www.cultureinside.com.

In December 2009, he participated in the Orchard Street Shul Cultural Heritage Artists Project at the John Slade Ely House Center for Contemporary Art in New Haven. His work was an audio take on prayer chants and ritual songs in Jewish culture.

On July 28, 2010, Shifreen worked with Cultureinside.com to premiere an art exhibition entitled EUtopia - Artistic Visions of Europe at the Centre Culturel de Recontre Abbaye de Neumunster in Luxembourg. The dual theme was centered on the name and the context of "poverty and social exclusion" in Europe. CultureInside first organized the show using its base of 3100 online members. 70 pieces of diverse media, including painting, photography, sculpture, digital, video, and performance, were then chosen by a curatorial committee. The works came from 13 different countries.

Guy de Muyser, President du Conseil d'Administration du CCRN, the organization that runs the Abbaye, as well as the Culture Minister of Luxembourg Octavie Modert, both spoke at the opening ceremony.

== Personal life ==
Shifreen continues to teach homebound disabled students for the New York City Department of Education. He is a practitioner of shamanism.

== See also ==
- Gowanus Memorial Artyard
