= David Fried =

American artist (born 1962)

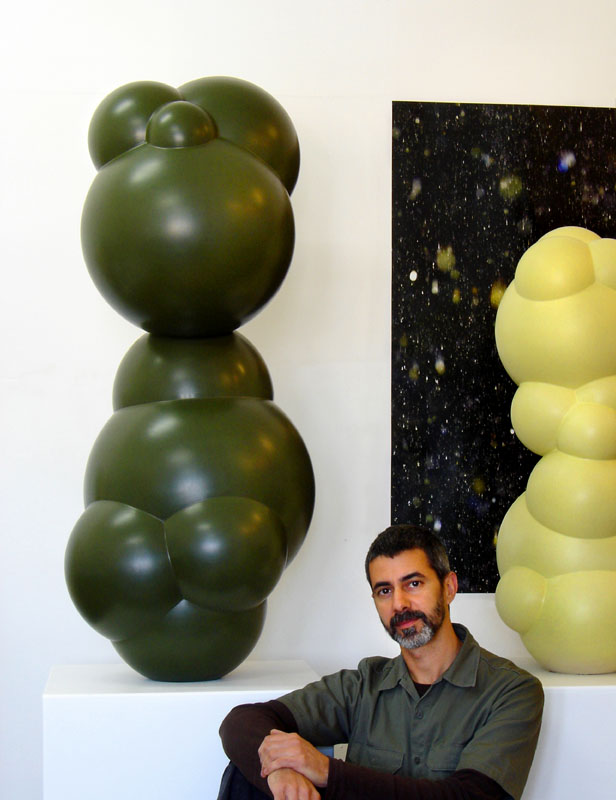
- david fried 2006
- Born: 1962; New York City
- Known for: Sculpture, Interactive art, Photograms, Photography, Painting
- Website: http://www.davidfried.com/

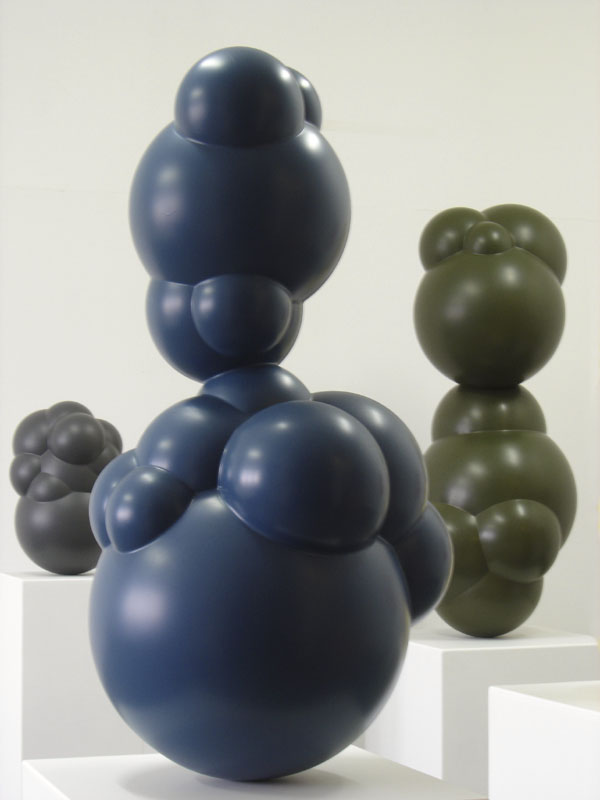
David Fried, Stemmers, exhibition view, aluminium, acrylic, epoxy, paint.

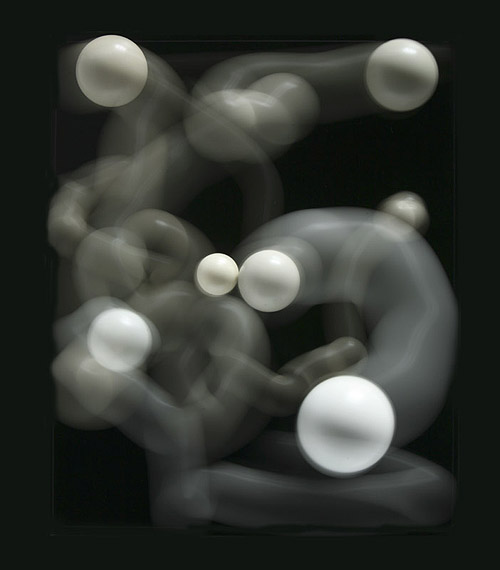
Way of Words, motiongram of sound stimulated interactive sculpture "Self Organizing Still-Life".

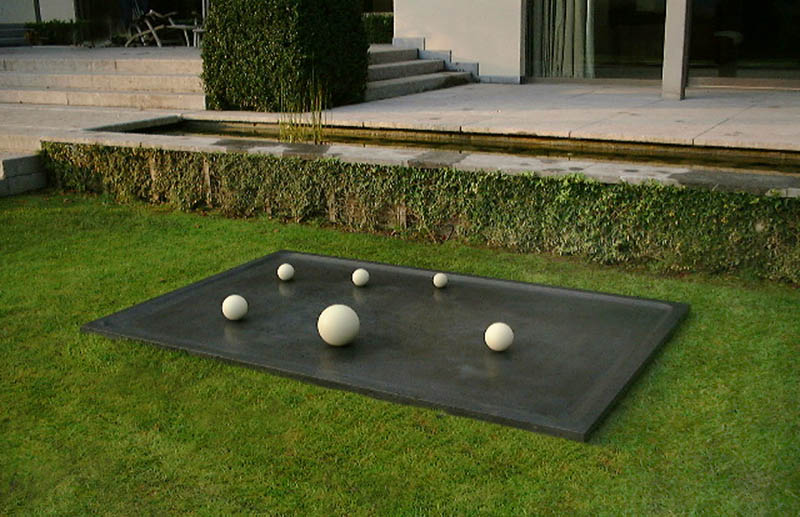
Self Organizing Still-Life, 2004, Sound stimulated interactive object, granite, marble, microphone, sensor, mixed media. private collection Brussels.

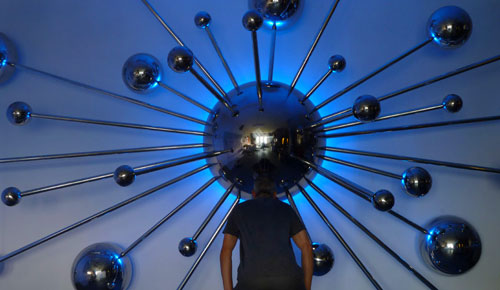
Globalexandria, PS-11, stainless steel, polished, 355 x 600 x 150 cm.

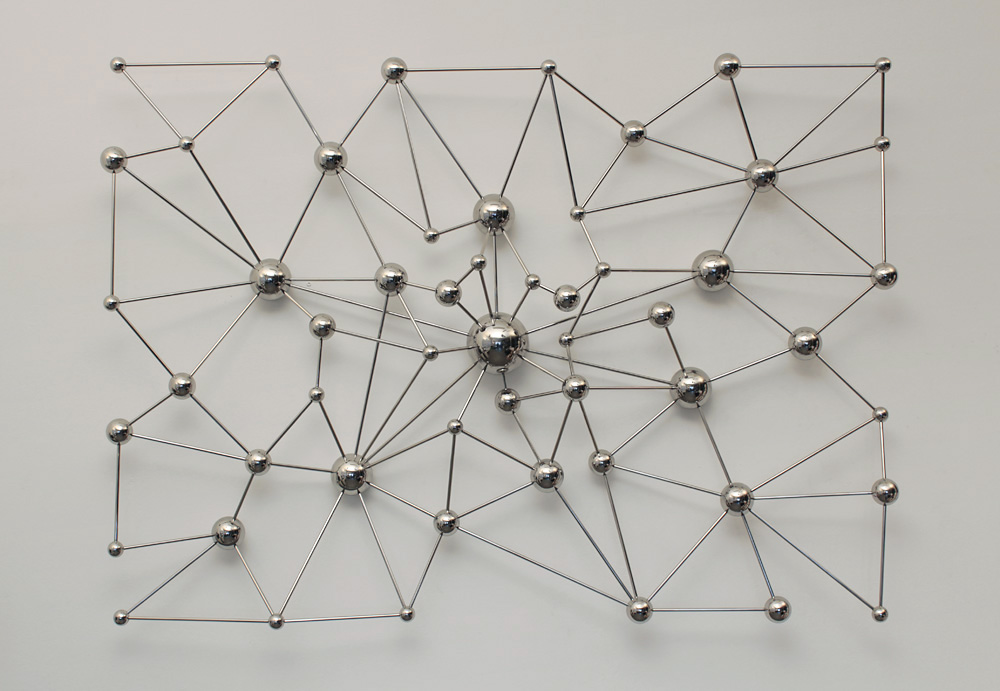
Globalexandria, W1-13, stainless steel, polished, 130 x 180 x 20 cm.

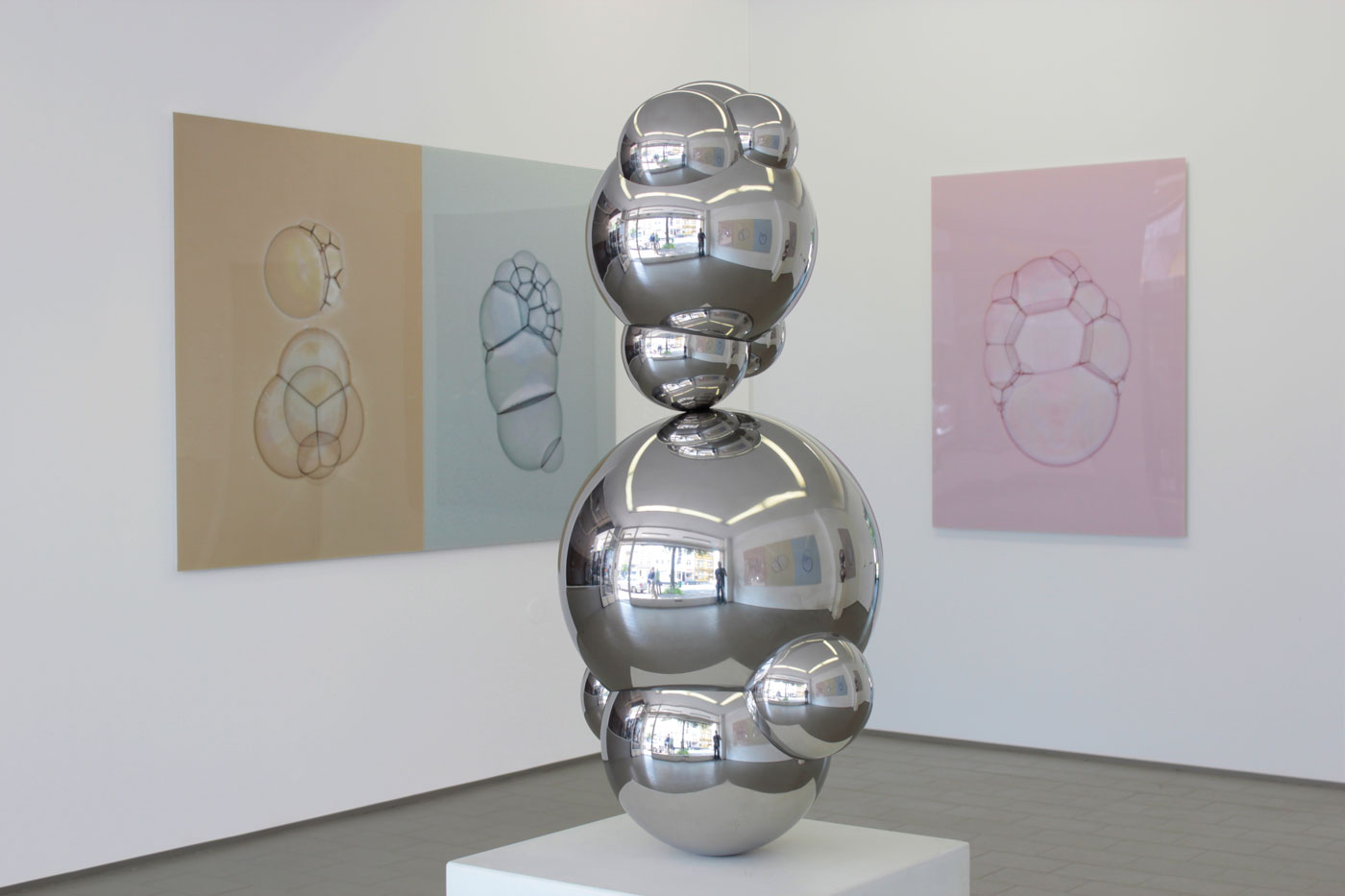
Stemmer, SS-3, stainless steel, polished, 60 x 55 x 120 cm.

David Fried (born 1962, New York City) is an American interdisciplinary, contemporary artist.

His stated conceptual focus is on dynamic non-linear and interdependent relationships found in nature and society, juxtaposed with the human desire to control, manipulate and predict outcomes. Fried’s works have been exhibited in the US, Europe, Asia and Australia. Major works have been included with artists Rebecca Horn, Robert Rauschenberg and Alexander Calder in an extensive traveling museum exhibition; "Drehen, Kreisen, Rotieren", and in "Genesis—The Art of Creation" with Joseph Beuys, Antony Gormley, Bruce Nauman at the Zentrum Paul Klee, Switzerland. His works are in international collections including a commissioned interactive installation on permanent view in Germany’s comprehensive kinetic art collection at the Kunstmuseum Gelsenkirchen. Fried first became known to the New York established art world in the early 1980s through his activities as a painter in the street art group AVANT, who alongside the then emerging artists Richard Hambleton, Keith Haring and Jean-Michel Basquiat began the post-graffiti street art movement in NYC. His efforts are mainly concentrated in Europe since relocating his studio from NYC to Düsseldorf in 1989.

== Early life and development ==
Born to low income parents in Manhattan, Fried grew up in a small apartment with opaquely curtained windows. He began drawing at the age of seven, and states his motivation for exploring art was "to express my own windows on the world". In 1972 at the age of ten, he was accepted to the Art Students League of New York as one of the few minors in the institution's history, and studied oil painting in the Isaac Soyer class. His earliest influences were painters like Rembrandt, Dalí and Yves Tanguy. His earliest works show experimentation in a range of styles with a common subject matter about the nature of being. In 1974, he mounted his first public solo exhibition of 20 oil paintings in Rockefeller Plaza. His artistic influences widened through his acquaintances with jazz musicians, philosophers, scientists and pioneers of abstract expressionism. After attending the school of Music and Art, in 1979 he pursued his art career as a painter with a focus on human dynamic relationships, portrayed in dysfunctional urban scenes. In 1981, Fried co-pioneered a guerilla street art collective named AVANT, leading to over forty gallery exhibitions of his work between 1981 and 1984 in SoHo, the East Village and the Lower East Side. In 1985, Fried began to investigate the photographic medium and its artistic potential from a painter’s perspective. To explore the highly technical medium, he freelanced at several NY photo labs to learn and use their facilities for his own artworks. In 1989 he moved his studio and own color photo labor to Düsseldorf, Germany. There he began developing a form of the old Gum bichromate technique—a process that makes artist-pigments photosensitive—with which he produced six years of large-scale photographic paintings. In the late 1990s, he expanded his artistic oeuvre into a multidisciplinary approach employing sculpture, interactive objects and photographic works. By 1996, he began his research into the color photogram and interactive art. According to an interview from 2001, it took Fried two years to amass the tools and skills necessary to create his first multimedia interactive work. In 1998, he publicly exhibited his first interactive "Self Organizing Still-Life" sculpture at the art fair "Art Forum Berlin". By 2000, there is no more imagery of the human form to be found in his work. His earlier philosophical focus on human interdependent dynamic relationships is reduced to their intrinsic qualities as such, and how various manifestations are both initiated and experienced on the global scale. His various works since the turn of the century also became more symbolic and minimalist in appearance. In 2003 his analogue photography series of "rainscapes" began, in 2004, a sculpture series titled "Stemmers", and in 2009 he commenced a series of stainless steel sculptures titled "Globalexandria". In 2012 he first employed computerized generative graphics combined with physical interactive kinetic objects that merge the distinctions between the "real" and the "virtual" in one artwork.

== Solo exhibitions (selection) ==
- 2013 Spheres of Influence II, SPAM Contemporary, Düsseldorf, Germany
- 2012 Troner Art, Stilwerk Düsseldorf, Germany
- 2009 Position Probable, Dominik Mersch Gallery, Sydney, Australia
- 2009 Spheres of Influence, Gallery Samuelis Baumgarte, Bielefeld, Germany
- 2008 Ultimate Photography, Gallery Monos, Liège, Belgium
- 2007 Far from Equilibrium, Sara Tecchia Roma New York, New York, USA
- 2007 Living Variables, Galerie Kasten, Mannheim, Germany
- 2005 Distribution of Fate. Regional Museum Xanten, Germany
- 2003 Missing Link, Gallery Adler, Frankfurt, Germany
- 2001 Night of the Museums, Jörg Immendorff harbor penthouse, Düsseldorf, Germany
- 1990 Gallery Martin Kudlek, Cologne, Germany

== Group exhibitions (selection) ==
- 2013 Grosse Kunst Austellung NRW, Museum Kunst Palast, Düsseldorf, Germany
- 2011 Wasser, Kunsthalle Messmer, Germany
- Google Science, Google HQ, Palo Alto, CA
- 2010 Agenda, Dominik Mersch Gallery, Sydney, Australia
- Schaulager, Hans Peter Zimmer Foundation, Düsseldorf, Germany
- 2009 Fall Forward, Sara Tecchia Roma New York, New York
- Uber's Sofa II, Tröner Art, Düsseldorf, Germany
- 2008 Bildertausch 3 - Collection Marli Hoppe-Ritter, Kunstmuseum Ritter, Germany
- 2007 Genesis - The Art of Creation - Zentrum Paul Klee, Bern, Switzerland
- Sculpture in Motion - Atlanta Botanical Garden, USA
- Galerie Kasten, Mannheim, Germany
- Kunstverein Ludwigshafen, Germany
- 2006 Bewegung im Quadrat, Commission for Permanent Collection, Kunstmuseum Ritter, Germany
- A Summer Show, Sara Tecchia Roma New York, New York, USA
- Galerie Kasten, Mannheim, Germany
- Plastic Fantastic, The Shore Institute of the Contemporary Arts, NJ, USA
- Joint Venture, Richard Nelson & Pence Gallery, University of CA. at Davis, USA
- 2005 Himmelsbilder, Dommuseum Salzburg, Austria
- 2004 Skywatch, K26, Frankfurt, Germany
- Museum Kunst Palast, Düsseldorf, Germany
- 2003 Kunst in Bewegung, traveling exhibition: Kunstmuseum Ahlen, Germany
- 2002 Kunst in Bewegung, Museum Pfalzgalerie Kaiserslautern, Germany
- Kunst in Bewegung, Kunstmuseum Heidenheim, Germany
- Kunst in Bewegung, Kunstmuseum im Kulterspeicher Würzburg, Germany
- Gleicher Ort Neue Zeit, Düsseldorf, Germany
- 2001 Illusions in Space, Sculpturesite Gallery, Berkeley, USA.
- 2000 Kunstmuseum Gelsenkirchen, Germany, Permanent collection & display
- 1998 Martin Kudlek Fine Art, Aachen, New York Artists, Cologne, Germany
- 1997 Martin Kudlek Fine Art, Aachen, Cologne, Germany
- 1993 Amerika Haus, Cologne, Germany
- 1992 Das Bild im Bild, Articom, Frankfurt, Germany
- Visionäre Schweiz, Museum Kunst Palast, Düsseldorf, Germany
- ID Galerie, Düsseldorf, Germany
- 1985 The B.A.D.Gallery, NYC, USA
- 1984 Gallery 51X, NYC, USA
- 1983 AVANT, Gabrielle Bryers Gallery, NYC, USA
- LowerEastSide Street Art, GuGu Ernesto Gallery, Cologne, Germany
- LowerEastSide Street Art, Galleria Lo Zebbetto, Milano, Italy
- AVANT - Guerilla Art, Gallery 51X, NYC, USA
- Terminal New York, Brooklyn Army Terminal, NYC, USA
- Avant and friends, N.Y.U. Contemporary Art Gallery, NYC, USA
- 1982 The Monument Redefined, Gowanus Memorial Art Yard, NYC, USA.
- Stolen Show, curated and exhibited, Alain Bilhaud Gallery, NYC, USA
- 51Xpressionism, Gallery 51X, NYC, USA
- 1981 The Monumental Show, Gowanus Memorial Art Yard, NYC, USA.
- International art fairs 1998-2011

Art Stage Singapore, Art Forum Berlin, Art Frankfurt, Art Brussels, Scope New York, Scope London, Art Cologne, Art Basel,

Scope East Hampton, Wynward Miami, Paris, Paris Photo, Melbourne Art, Photo London, Art.Fair Köln, Liste Berlin, Liste Köln.

== Bibliography ==
- 2012 ArtInvestor Magazine, No.06/12, "Dynamische Kunstobjekte" Dominique Dabrowski. pp. 69,70
- 2010 West Side Philosophers Inc, "Fatal Numbers—Why count on Chance" by Hans Magnus Enzensberger. pp. 1, 4, 6, 10, 36, 50, 52, cover
- 2009 Museum Ritter "Hommage to the Square - works from the Marli Hoppe-Ritter collection 1915 to 2009". ISBN 9783884233351, pp. 111, 112
- 2008 PBA - Public Broadcasting Atlanta, "Sculpture in Motion", Program & Interview, PBA TV-broadcast July 2008
- 2008 Die Gestalten Verlag, Berlin, Kirsten & Lukas Feireiss, "Architecture of Change—Sustainability and Humanity in the Built Environment", ISBN 9783899552119, pp. 1, 2, 311, 312
- 2007 Zentrum Paul Klee - Bern. Exhibition catalogue "Genesis—the Art of Creation" Curated by Fabienne Eggelhöfer. pp. 50, 51, 54, 55, cover
- 2007 Vernissage-TV, review by solo exhibition: "Far from Equilibrium" at Sara Tecchia Gallery New York.
- 2007 Saatchi Online, Trent Morse, "David Fried at Sara Tecchia Gallery, New York". 10.18.2007
- 2007 dART magazine, Christopher Hart Chambers, "Confined Chaos—Life according to David Fried", Vol.9-No.2, pp. 25–27
- 2007 Meier Magazine, Interview with Eva Mayer, "Kontrol und Chaos", November 2007, pp. 86
- 2007 Manheimer Morgen, Barbara Foester, "Weniger ist eben oft viel mehr", 09.11.2007, pp. 31
- 2007 Die Gestalten Verlag, Berlin, "Into the Nature", ISBN 9783899550993, pp. 192–195
- 2005 Rheinische Post, Magdalena Kröner, "Blubbern voller Bedueutung", 28.12.2005, pp. 46
- 2005 Europa Sur, review by José Luis Tobalina, "La imagen fotográfica como filosofía", 29.10.2005, pp. 64, cover
- 2005 Sur, review by Sandra Balvín, "Un mundo por descubrir", 29.10.2005, pp. 12
- 2004 NYArts magazine, International edition, Christopher Hart Chambers, "Spring Picks", Vol.9-No.5/6, pp. 88.
- 2003 World of Art Magazine, Vol.3-No.6, Picks, pp. 92
- 2002 Frankfurter Rundschau, review by Annette Wollenhaupt, "Von Begegnungen und fragilen Verbindungen", 08.08.2002, pp. 39
- 2001 Rheinische Post, Sigrid Blomen-Radermacher, "Kunst nach Stammzellen-Art", 08.05.2001, pp. 47
- 2001 Westdeutscher Rundfunk- WDR, Kulturszene TV review of "Kunst Köln". WDR TV-broadcast November 2001
- 1998 TV Berlin, review of "Art Forum Berlin". TV-broadcast October 2, 1998

== Collections ==
- Kunstmuseum Ritter, Germany
- Kunstmuseum Gelsenkirchen, Germany
- Victonia, Frankfurt

== Books ==
- David Fried, Rainscapes – photography, Verlag Poller 2004, ISBN 3980285898
- David Fried, Self Organizing Still life – sound stimulated interactive sculptures, Verlag Poller 2006, ISBN 3980285871
- David Fried, In bed with Lucy and Dolly – photograms, Verlag Poller 2004, ISBN 398028588X
- David Fried, Far from Equilibrium / Fern vom Gleichgewicht, Kerber Verlag, 2018, ISBN 978-3-7356-0452-1
