= John Broughton (disambiguation) =

John Broughton (born 1952) is an Australian astronomer.

John Broughton or Jack Broughton may also refer to:

- Jack Broughton (1703 or 1704–1789), English boxer.
- Jack Broughton (RAF officer) (1933/1934–2023), senior RAF officer in the 1970s and 1980s
- Jacksel M. Broughton (1925–2014), career officer and fighter pilot in the US Air Force
- John Broughton (cricketer) (1873–1952), English cricketer
- John Broughton (dentist) (1947–2026), New Zealand dental and Māori health academic and playwright
- John M. Broughton, British psychologist
- John Broughton, author of the 2008 book Wikipedia – The Missing Manual
