= Route 471 (Israel) =

Route in Israel

Highway 471
- כביש 471
- Maccabit Road; Hebrew: כביש מכבית, romanized: Kvish Maccabit
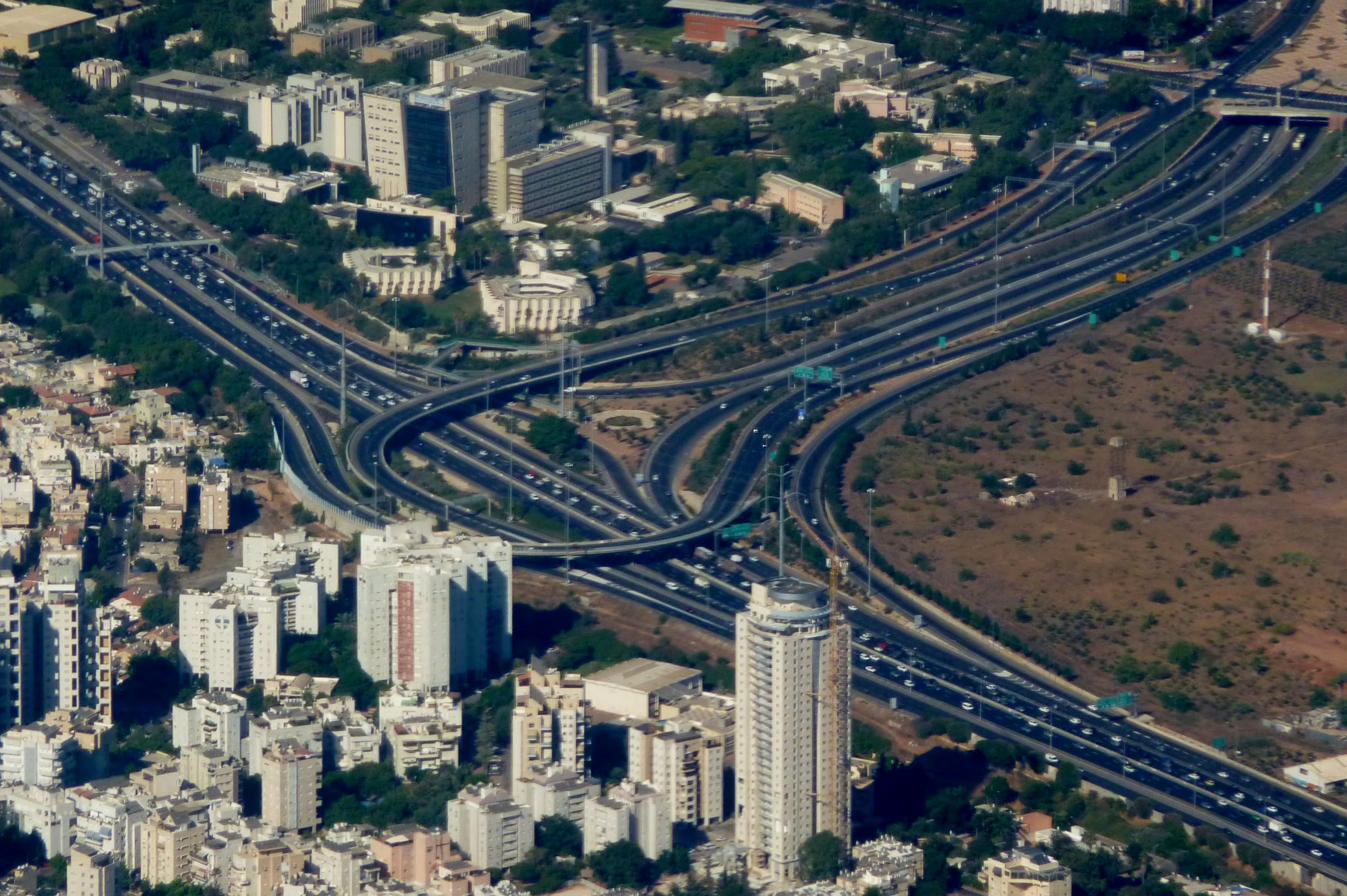
- The beginning of Route 471 at the Bar-Ilan Interchange

Route information
- Length: 11 km (6.8 mi)

Major junctions
- West end: Bar Ilan Interchange
- Bar Ilan Interchange; Sha'ariyya Junction; Nahshonim Interchange
- East end: Migdal Afek Junction

Location
- Country: Israel
- Major cities: Ramat Gan, Givat Shmuel, Kiryat Ono, Petah Tikva, Ganei Tikva

Highway system
- Roads in Israel; Highways
← Route 466	→ Route 481

Highway 471 (Hebrew: כביש 471), commonly called Maccabit Road, is a suburban expressway in the center of the Tel Aviv Metropolitan Area in Israel. The expressway connects Highway 4 in the west with Route 444 in the east. It is part of a road system planned to provide improved access to Highway 6.

The construction of Highway 471 was plagued with bureaucracy, massive opposition from neighbouring municipalities and budget overruns, all of which caused major delays in construction.

Highway 471 was fully opened on October 16, 2014, after its eastern section, between Route 444 and Highway 6, was partially opened since 2008 without a name. However, there are still two at-grade intersections in its western section. After much delay, extensive works began in 2011 to construct large interchanges in place of these two intersections. When completed, the road will be a vital freeway highway between Highways 6 and 4.

== Highway description ==
Highway 471 starts at Bar Ilan Interchange with Highway 4 in Ramat Gan. It then continues east through a short tunnel and bypasses Kiryat Ono. It then passes between Petah Tikva and Ganei Tikva until it reaches Gat-Rimon Junction. The section between Bar Ilan and Gat Rimon is built to full freeway standards, fully grade-separated with three to four lanes in each direction and wide shoulders. However, the road is not signed as a freeway.

From Gat-Rimon, the road continues east, bypassing Petah Tikva from the south until it meets Highway 6 at Nahshonim Interchange. It continues 1km east to its terminus at Migdal Afek Junction with Route 444. This section has only two lanes in each direction with at-grade intersections.

== Controversies ==
Route 471 was originally planned to fully open in 2003, together with the central section of Highway 6. However, only the first two sections opened in 2002, and although most of the work on the western section was completed by 2005, it remained closed until late 2007. Thanks to the wide and levelled roadbed, the section was unofficially used as a makeshift roller skating course. The gap caused severe traffic problems in the area, as drivers who wished to bypass the missing section used residential streets in Gat Rimon, Ganei Tikva and Kiryat Ono. To prevent drivers from using this route, some of the turns at the Gat Rimon Intersection remained closed until the western section opened.

The Kiryat Ono municipality was concerned about noise and air pollution from the new expressway. To address this, the expressway was built in a trench, acoustic walls were erected, and some of the route adjacent to Kiryat Ono was built in a tunnel. The municipality was also concerned that the opening of a new entrance to Petah Tikva would cause the city's main street, Levi Eshkol Street, to turn into a bypass for the congested Geha Highway. The municipality instead proposed the construction of a western bypass of Kiryat Ono before the opening of the connection to Petah Tikva. Even after the expressway fully opened, the municipality blocked the connection to Petah Tikva using concrete barriers and sand piles for several weeks.

Another delay was the public opposition from the residents of the Gat Rimon neighbourhood in Petah Tikva. It was to be demolished to make way for the Gat Rimon Interchange. However, the National Roads Authority failed to reach a compensation agreement with the residents. The matter went to court, and the Ministry of Transportation decided to build a temporary northern bypass until the case was settled. The bypass includes two signalled intersections and a shared section with a city street, causing severe traffic jams on the expressway.

The opening of the western section also caused an increase in traffic on Aluf Sade Road in Ramat Gan, a major artery connecting Highway 4, Route 471's western terminus, with central Tel Aviv. Severe traffic jams were reported in Ramat Gan during the first days after the expressway's opening, and the Mayor of Ramat Gan told reporters that he had demanded improvements to Aluf Sade Road before the opening of Route 471. However, these were not carried out. Eventually, traffic improved somewhat after the traffic lights programs at Aluf Sade Interchange were improved, however the road remains regularly jammed. The National Roads Authority started working on improving traffic flow at Aluf Sade Interchange in 2009.

On March 16, 2009, the National Roads Company published a tender to complete the missing interchanges on the eastern section and bring it up to freeway standards. The tender was awarded to Hofrey HaSharon. However, one of the losing companies filed a lawsuit, EYL Sela. It was claimed that there was a conflict of interest in the selection of Hofrey HaSharon's offer, which was 11 million NIS more expensive than EYL Sela, as one of the members of the tenders committee was a former employee of Hofrey HaSharon. The matter went back and forth to the Regional and Supreme courts for over a year, with a second lawsuit filed by Minrab, another company which lost the tender. The matter was eventually settled on August 9, 2010, when the Supreme Court ordered Hofrey HaSharon to start work on the road to address the immediate public interest. Should the court eventually rule in favour of Minrab, the National Roads Company will be required to compensate Minrab. The tender stated that the works would last 36 months, meaning that the road would be completed in late 2013, at best.

== Junctions and interchanges ==
km	Name	Type	Meaning	Location	Road(s) Crossed
0	מחלף בר אילן (Bar Ilan Interchange)		Named after Bar Ilan University	Ramat Gan	Highway 4
0.6				Bar Ilan University; Giv'at Shmuel; Kfar Azar; Kiryat Ono	Keren Hayesod Road, Jabotinsky St., Aharon Katzir Blvd., Herzl St.
0.6	Tunnel; 3 lanes eastbound, 4 lanes westbound			Kiryat Ono	350 metres
2	מחלף אונו (Ono Interchange)		Named after location (Valley of) His Power	Petah Tikva; Kiryat Ono	Yitzhak Rabin Road, Levi Eshkol Road
4.5	מחלף גת רימון (Gat Rimon Interchange)		Named after location Pomegranate Press	Petah Tikva; Gat Rimon	Ya'akov Zrubavel St. HaTapuz St.
6.4	מחלף שעריה (Sha'ariyya Interchange)		Named after nearby neighborhood Gates of God	Petah Tikva; Nechalim	Highway 40
7.6	מחלף עמישב (Amishav Interchange)		Named after nearby neighborhood My People Returned	Petah Tikva; Kfar Sirkin	Menachim Begin Road
9.5	מחלף נחשונים (Nahshonim Interchange)		Named after location Pioneers	Nahshonim	Highway 6
10.3	צומת מגדל אפק (Migdal Afek Junction)		Named after nearby Tel Afek; Tower of Afek	Nahshonim	Route 444
