= May Tager =

Israeli model (born in 1998)

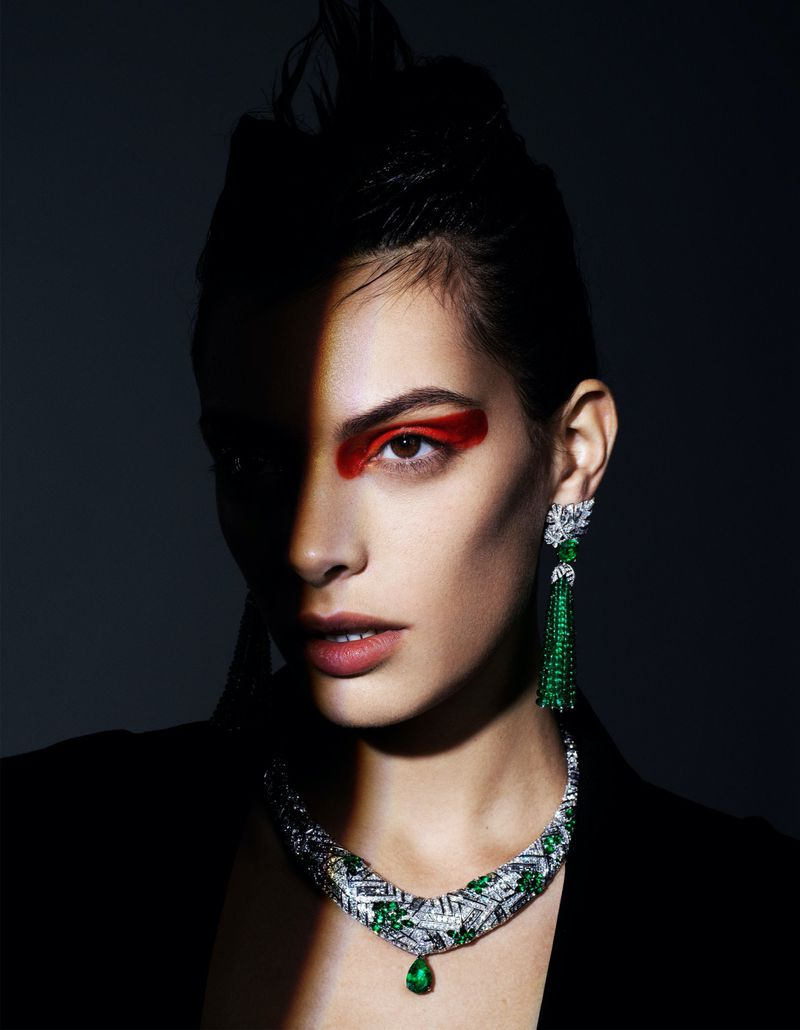
- Vogue Arabia 2021
- Born: 22 November 1998 (age 26)
- Modeling information
- Height: 175 cm (5 ft 9 in)
- Hair color: brown
- Eye color: dark brown
- Agencies: IMG Models, View Management, Modellink, Yuvigroup

May Tager (Hebrew: מאי תג'ר; born 22 November 1998) is an Israeli model. As of 2023, Tager has worked with international brands such as Armani, Victoria's Secret, Louis Vuitton and many more in the past. Tager gained recognition after replacing supermodel Bella Hadid as the face of Dior for the holiday campaign 2023. Tager is signed with IMG Models.

== Early life ==
May Tager was born in Denmark on 22 November 1998 to Jewish parents. Her family later moved to Ganei Tikva, Israel where she grew up. Tager now resides in the United States to pursue her modelling career. Tager is of Yemenite and Danish descent.

== Career ==
May Tager was discovered at the age of 15 when an agent blocked her mother's car and started talking to Tager. Tager began working internationally at the age of 16, in London. Tager got her major gig at the age of 18 after doing a photoshoot for Estee Lauder. She has been described as an Israeli classic beauty, with dark and dreamy doe eyes. Tager made her runway debut for Courreges FW21 and in 2021 she posed for Vogue Arabia.

In late 2023, Tager was chosen to be the face of the new Dior holiday campaign, but received antisemitic backlash from Pro-Palestine activists for "replacing" American supermodel Bella Hadid of Palestinian and Dutch descent as the face of the brand. It was later revealed that Tager didn't replace Hadid, as Dior's partnership with Hadid ended in March 2022.
