= Culture Inside =

Social networking website for artists

- Website type: social networking site
- Available in: English, German, French
- Creators: Gila and Dominique Paris
- Website: www.CultureInside.com
- Commercial: No
- Registration: Free
- Launched: 2008; 18 years ago
- Current status: Online

CultureInside is a non-profit free social networking site for the artistic community. Founded by Gila and Dominique Paris in 2008, it has offices in Luxembourg and New York City (United States). They frequently use the network to organize online exhibitions, as well as international exhibits in the United States and European Union. In April 2009 they received the label Creativity and Innovation in the European Year 2009.

== Founding ==
The site was founded without external funding or capital a by close group of art and web professionals which included Gila Paris and Dominique Paris. After a research and beta phase starting in November 2007, the site was launched in 2008.

== Overview ==
The site is fully in French, German, and English, with Spanish translations pending as of March 2009. Its purpose is to serve as an artist's initiative and a free online social network for the international arts community. The site is designed for emerging and mid-career artists, buyers, collectors, galleries, curators, museums, and art schools to interact as a community. Members of the public interested in art are encouraged to join as well. Different artist e-spaces can be linked together to create friends and group networks.

=== Operations ===
Gila and Dominique Paris are based in Luxembourg, as is site's main office, which is at Rue Basse, 77 L-7307 Steinsel. In 2008 they began working with close friend and curator Frank Shifreen to open an office in New York City at 290 Elizabeth Street, #1R.

In 2010 PRO Services, a professional service for the website's artists that works in connection with an art eCommerce complement, was fully integrated into the platform. The service supports an "Art Market Place" where artists can sell original artwork and take orders for "Fine Art Prints" upon demand on museum quality paper. Both the PRO Services and the eCommerce aspects are operated by the privately owned company GATE C Sàrl in Luxembourg.

The site's stated goal is to focus on the Grand Region of the European Union, focusing on supporting and integrating cultural efforts in the EU Member States. Dominique and Gila Paris, founding members, have served as CultureInside board members since November 2007.

== Exhibitions ==
Since its inception, CultureInside has used its social platform to organize and curate several exhibits and competitions, with winners premiering their work in high-class galleries and museums through the United States and Europe.

ROOTED (June 2009)

Frank Shifreen and Gila Paris worked through CultureInside to organize ROOTED, an exhibition. The theme was an "investigation...of the term rooted", with proposals to be submitted in a CultureInside online gallery to be looked over by a curatorial committee. The five winners had their work physically exhibited at the Luxembourg gallery the Galerie Clairefontaine, while the other 25 finalists had their worked selected for an online show and catalog. Winners were Brad Carlile of the United States, Adam Martinakis of Greece, Nebojsa Despotovic of Serbia, Myriam Ziade of Luxembourg, and Franca Giovanrosa of Italy. The show ran from June 25, 2009 to July 25, 2009, with the Luxembourg television station RTL.LU KULTUR covering the opening.

Recession Art Sale Gallery (October 2009)

In September and October 2009, Shifreen co-produced the A Bailout for the Rest of Us: Recession Art Sale in Manhattan with Elanit Kayne. It featured thirty artists and thirty out-of-work professional artists. Shifreen hosted the online gallery on www.cultureinside.com.

State of Creation (June 2010)

In June 2010, CultureInside organized the online and physical exhibition State of Creation. Participants must have had a free account on CultureInside, and the proposals of digital art and modern photography were required to be related to the themes of creation, social dynamics, progress and innovation. The winner was rewarded the "WANE" prize.

The curatorial committee consisted of Kevin Muhlen, artistic director at the Casino Forum d’exposition in Luxembourg, Serge Basso, artistic director at the Kulturfabrik Esch, Esch-sur-Alzette, Mert Akbal, teacher at the University of the Arts, Saarbrücken, Germany, photographer Jean-Pierre Ruelle, exhibition manager Sara Corti Jayasuriya, Frédérique Gueth of 1,2,3 GO, and Gila Paris.

The winning artists premiered their work at an exhibition on June 16, 2010 at the Chamber of Commerce in Luxembourg. It was also the tenth anniversary of the group 1,2,3 GO. The following day the exhibition moved to the European Commission in Luxembourg. It then stayed until July 9 at the Conference Center of the European Commission in Luxembourg. All the winning work remains part of a permanent online exhibition.

EUtopia - Artistic Visions of Europe (July 2010)

On July 28, 2010, Cultureinside.com curated and premiered an art exhibition entitled EUtopia - Artistic Visions of Europe at the Centre Culturel de Recontre Abbaye de Neumunster, Cloitre in Luxembourg. The dual theme was centered on the name and the context of "poverty and social exclusion" in Europe. CultureInside first organized the show using its base of 3100 online members. 70 pieces of diverse media, including painting, photography, sculpture, digital work, video, and performance, were then chosen by a curatorial committee. The works came from 13 different countries. The show ran until September 15, and a public prize was voted on online. Guy de Muyser, President du Conseil d'Administration du CCRN, the organization that runs the Abbaye, as well as the Culture Minister of Luxembourg Octavie Modert, both spoke at the opening ceremony.

The Crazy Show (November 2010)

On September 29, 2010, The Art Inquirer reported on CultureInside's The Crazy Show, a curated exhibition that challenged artists and art groups to submit creative works online that "represent paradoxical ideas that provoke the break of the logical thought." On November 3 the selected works were published on the site, with the CultureInside Facebook Community choosing the "craziest" work and recipient of a reward.

== Awards ==
- April 2009 — earned label Creativity and Innovation European Year 2009 (Luxembourg)
- September 2009 — Lauréat "1,2,3, GO program" Best Business Plan
- April 2010 — EUtopia received the Label 2010 European Year for Combating Poverty and Social Exclusion for its engagement and creative contribution to the EU programme.

== CultureOutside ==
The group is developing a sister website entitled Culture Outside, which will exist for the intent of encourage artists and curators to develop and create exhibitions using the site as a catalog. The selected exhibitions will be leasable to galleries and institutions.
