= Boaz Vaadia =

Israeli–American artist and sculptor

Boaz Vaadia בועז ועדיה
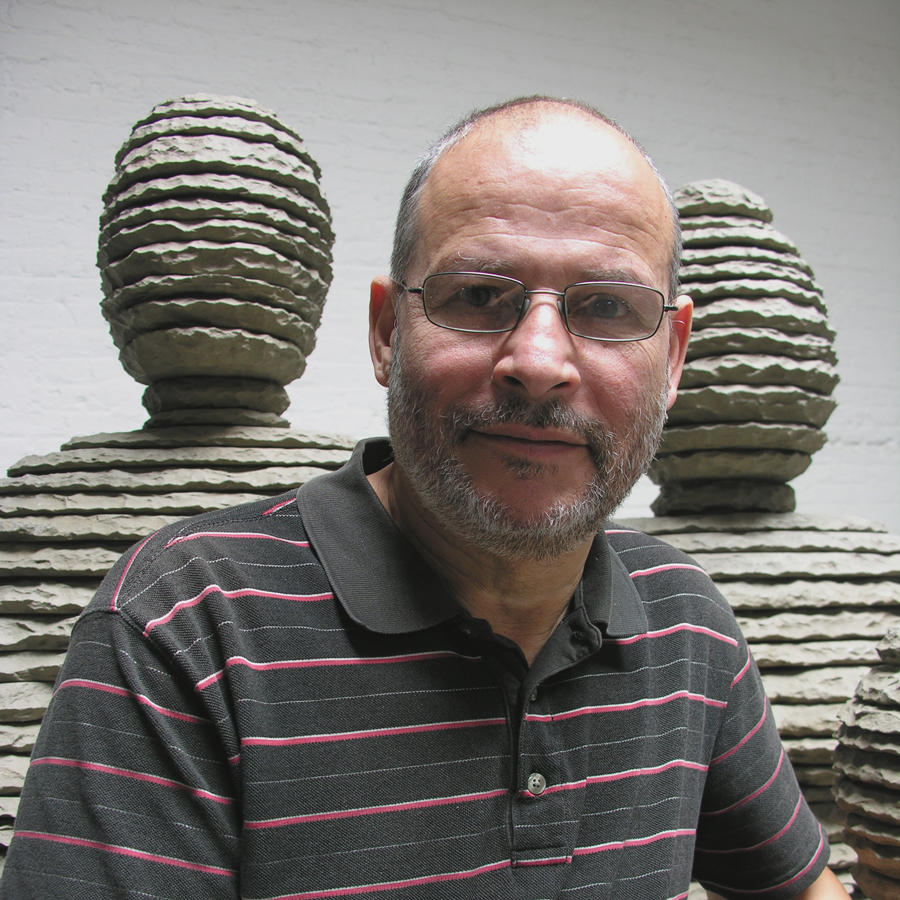
- Vaadia in 2009
- Born: November 13, 1951; Gat Rimon, Israel
- Died: February 25, 2017 (aged 65); New York City, US
- Education: Avni Institute of Art and Design
- Known for: Sculptor

Boaz Vaadia (Hebrew: בועז ועדיה; November 13, 1951 – February 25, 2017) was an Israeli–American artist and sculptor who worked primarily in stone and subsequently by casting in bronze. Based in New York City since 1975, his studio was located in Brooklyn. The power of natural materials and the relation of human beings to that power determine the content of Vaadia's sculpture. Vaadia said of his work, "I work with nature as an equal partner. The strongest thing I address is that primal connection of man to earth. It's in the materials I use, the environments I make, and the way I work."

Numerous public and private collectors from around the world have acquired Vaadia's works for their collections. They include The Metropolitan Museum of Art, New York City; the San Francisco Museum of Modern Art, California; The Israel Museum, Jerusalem; The Hakone Open-Air Museum, Hakone, Japan, and Grounds For Sculpture, Hamilton, NJ.

Vaadia succumbed to pancreatic cancer at age 65.

== Early life ==
Boaz Vaadia was born on a small farm in Gat Rimon, Israel, and credits his parents with instilling a tremendous love for the earth in him and a sense of connection to it that amounted to veneration. Growing up on a farm, he learned from his father to use a mule to plow the fields as opposed to a tractor because "the tractor raped the land." At age 12, he recognized himself to be a sculptor and set his mind on that career path. At age 14, he skipped high school and went directly to art school at Avni Institute of Art and Design in Jaffa, by claiming to be two years older than he was. In 1969 Vaadia was drafted into the Israeli army and was assigned to an engineering unit. During his periods of leave, he volunteered to restore ancient stonework in Jerusalem at the Church of the Holy Sepulchre. Working with Palestinian stonemasons, he learned the ancient way of handling local stone. He also worked with a blacksmith who made tools for stone carvers, learning how such tools were made, and to appreciate the tools with which he worked. He was discharged from the army in 1970. In 1974, Vaadia received a major scholarship from the America-Israel Cultural Foundation to study in New York City. Vaadia moved to New York City in 1975, where he studied at Pratt Institute and continued to pursue his career as a sculptor.

Vaadia made a great personal discovery very shortly after his arrival in New York, when he accepted its urban environment as being as natural to humans as the rural setting he grew up in. He searched for materials in the city that he could relate to as a primal building block of his environment, and discovered those that would guide his work thereafter: bluestone pavement from the city's streets and slate roofing tiles, both of which were being discarded during New York's process of urban renewal.

The sedimentary bluestone that the artist reclaimed from the city streets naturally breaks in layers. Vaadia recalls, "When I first worked with this material, I tried to force it into more continuous, conventional forms, and found that it always fractured in the wrong places. The moment that I discovered my true style of work was when instead of fighting the stone, I surrendered to it, letting the material's inherent characteristics dictate the form, in a way that echoes the way in which sediment is naturally layered in rock."

== Early works, 1971–1985 ==
In 1971, Boaz Vaadia graduated from the Avni Institute of Fine Arts in Tel Aviv. Staying on to teach there and already familiar with welding steel, Vaadia built a foundry from scratch so that he could learn how to cast his works in bronze. By 1972, he introduced stone into his works and eventually added human hair in his exploration of the subject of death. By 1973, he began exploring surrealist influences by creating dripping shapes in metal and stone in addition to using sheep hides, branches, and leather in his work.

By 1976, Vaadia began his work with the sedimentary stone. With these works, he began exploring the natural force of gravity. In some of these works, he found resourceful ways to suspend a large stone serving as an integral compositional element. He used the weight of the stone to provide the necessary gravitational force that would allow the piece to stand. Recognizing the physical truths revealed in the process of making this body of work, Vaadia moved toward deeper explorations of three-dimensional concepts and focused on his interest in structure, balance, and gravity.

== Works in stone, slate, and bronze, 1985–2016 ==
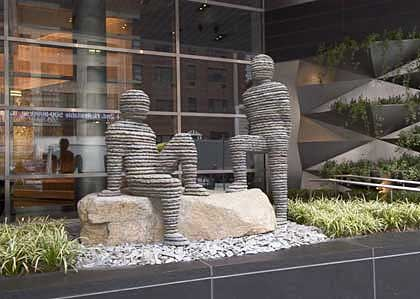
Asaf and Yo'ah at the Time Warner Center in New York City

Beginning in 1985, Vaadia turned his efforts toward figurative motifs executed solely in stone. Retained from previous efforts was the utilization of gravity as a force in maintaining stability. For these body-based forms, his methodology entailed stacking gradated rock sheets in a formation suggestive of individual stones modified by chisel-marked surfaces.

Vaadia says, "It was quite an exciting moment for me when I realized that I actually could go back to figurative work and still have the respect for the way the bluestone and slate are formed in nature…" By chipping away unwanted rock, Vaadia took advantage of the way nature layers sediment. Using traditional tools – hammer and chisel – he molded each single stone to suit the whole composition. As a result, this work reflects sculptural techniques which parallel natural transformations in stone. The artist's stratification of stones echoes natural conversions of matter.

This development within his work opened up a long period of great creative output and recognition. Vaadia understood that his chosen materials limited what could be built with them, and by respecting the structural properties of bluestone slabs, he created an artistic restriction for himself: each one of his sculptures must be able to stand and to hold together bound only by the force of gravity (though ultimately bolted together for safety and permanency). As a result, he has knowingly limited himself to stable, compact poses, and a generalized human form that alludes to Easter Island moai, Egyptian Pharonic sculpture, and Buddhist repose.

In the latter part of the eighties, Vaadia introduced second and third figures into his work. Glenn Harper, editor of Sculpture Magazine, noted about these pieces, "The figures are indeed composed…within the groups, there is an emotional dynamic, but more of a bond than a conflict. And there is a profound sense of honoring ordinary people, rather than memorializing 'heroes,' in all the work."

In 1987, Boaz opened his practice to include limited editions of the stone sculptures cast in bronze, augmenting his capacity to explore new compositions through the relationships between multiple figures. In 1989 he bought a studio in Williamsburg (Brooklyn). The streets there were also being torn up. When he saw ancient boulders being pulled out of the ground during sewer repairs near his Berry Street studio in 1989, he was determined to salvage them and subsequently incorporated them into his figural compositions. For the last 30 years, he has expanded his exploration of the layered figure through scale, and through varied groupings based on family and on domesticated animals. In 2002, Vaadia began to create portraiture, achieving a likeness through shape, form, and posture, while adhering to his signature style. In 2011, he developed a new way to make his sculpture visible to the viewer, photographing each successive layer of the sculpture Haza'el. The result was forty-two seemingly abstract images, beginning with the bluestone base and ending with the capstone of the head. Vaadia's recent work on a series of bas-relief sculptures allowed him a new level of definition and feature detail because of the inherent architectural support of the incorporated wall.

In 2014, Keno Auctions reported that Vaadia:

...incorporates material from the New York City environment, slate, shingle, bluestone and boulders, to create figural sculptures with universal features. His materials, particularly the blue stone and slate formed from layers of compressed sediment, are carved to expose each stratified layer. Relying on the weight of the stone, Vaadia's figures connect with nature to harness powers inherent in their materials. Each sculpture evokes an existential meditation on the progress of civilization and our human relationship with the environment. Vaadia's statement says, "Man came from the earth and in death returns to it. I see stone as the bone structure of the earth."

== Selected collections ==
- The Baker Museum, (formerly Naples Museum of Art), Naples, FL
- Bass Museum of Art, Miami Beach, FL
- Best Products Inc., Richmond, VA
- Cargill Inc., Minneapolis, MN
- Flint Institute of Arts, Flint, MI
- Hakone Open Air Museum, Kanagawa Prefecture, Japan
- The Israel Museum, Jerusalem, Israel
- The Jewish Museum, New York, NY
- La Salle Partners, Arlington, VA
- Lufthansa Airlines, East Meadow, NY
- The Metropolitan Museum of Art, New York, NY
- The Museum of Modern Art, San Francisco, CA
- Norton Museum of Art, West Palm Beach, FL
- Open Museum at Tefen, Israel
- Paine Webber Inc., Puerto Rico
- Point Leo Sculpture Park, Victoria, Australia
- Racine Art Museum (formerly Charles A. Wustum Museum of Fine Arts), Racine, WI
- Ravinia Sculpture Park, Chicago, IL
- The Related Companies, New York, NY
- Tel Aviv Museum of Art, Israel
- Tel Aviv Independence Park
- Time Warner Center, New York
- Tokyo Metropolitan Teien Museum, Japan
- Vero Beach Museum of Art, Vero Beach, FL

== Recognition ==
In 1975 Vaadia was the recipient of the America-Israel Cultural Foundation grant, and moved to New York to study at Pratt Institute. In 1976 he received a Beeckmann Scholarship to study at the Brooklyn Museum Art School, Brooklyn, NY, and was awarded an extension of the America-Israel Cultural Foundation grant for an additional year of study.

In 1977, through Lady Bird Johnson's America the Beautiful Fund, he was awarded an artistic residency in the Harriman section of Palisades Interstate Park NY, where he created a work that was placed on the Appalachian Trail. Vaadia received a grant award from the Committee for the Visual Arts, Artists Space, New York, NY, in 1985 and from the Ariana Foundation For the Arts, New York, NY, in 1986. In 1988 he received a grant from the National Endowment for the Arts, Washington, DC.

Vaadia traveled to Japan to receive the Utsukushi-ga-hara Open Air Museum Award in 1992. In 2012, the artist was presented with the America-Israel Cultural Foundation's Aviv Award for Artistic Achievement, New York, NY. In June 2014 The Russian American Foundation in cooperation with the New York Post awarded Vaadia the 12th Annual Russian Heritage Month Award for his exceptional contributions in promoting Bukharian heritage and culture through art.

== Art market ==
When he moved to SoHo in New York City in 1975, Vaadia met Ivan Karp, the legendary gallerist who would later become his dealer. His first major solo show of works produced in New York – ritualistic in nature and inspired by African fetishes, altars, and ancient tools – took place in 1976 at Hundred Acres Gallery, owned by Karp. Although Vaadia also showed at Elise Meyer Gallery in 1979, Karp remained his primary dealer. In 1986 he had his first figurative show at OK Harris Gallery in Soho. The entire show sold out in 3 hours, prompting Karp to comment that he'd "never seen anything like that in his entire life."

Vaadia is represented by Jim Kempner Fine Art in New York, NY; Connaught Brown in London, England, and Baker Sponder Gallery in Miami/Boca Raton.

== Death ==
At the time of his death on February 25, 2017, Vaadia was married to Kim Vaadia and had two daughters, Rebecca and Sara. His death was covered in a New York Times article on March 2, with the cause reported as being pancreatic cancer. According to the Times: "Kim Vaadia said that the family planned to turn his studio into a museum. He worked until nearly the end, she said, and his last finished work was a large stone relief."
