= Gowanus Memorial Artyard =

American nonprofit arts group

Coordinates: 40.67290°N 73.99712°W

The Gowanus Memorial Artyard was a nonprofit, artist-organized group that put together massive outdoor and indoor art exhibitions in Gowanus, Brooklyn, New York City in the early 1980s. Founded by artists and curators Michael Keene, Frank Shifreen, and George Moore, the shows featured monumental sculpture parks next to the Gowanus Canal. The two major shows attracted thousands of visitors during their brief runs in 1981 and 1982. The participants artists such as Carl Andre, Andy Warhol-sponsored Keith Haring, Christo, Linda and Terry Jamison, Vito Acconci, Nancy Holt, John Fekner, the controversial Chris Burden, sculptor Jim Nickel, and Fred Wilson.

== Group founding ==
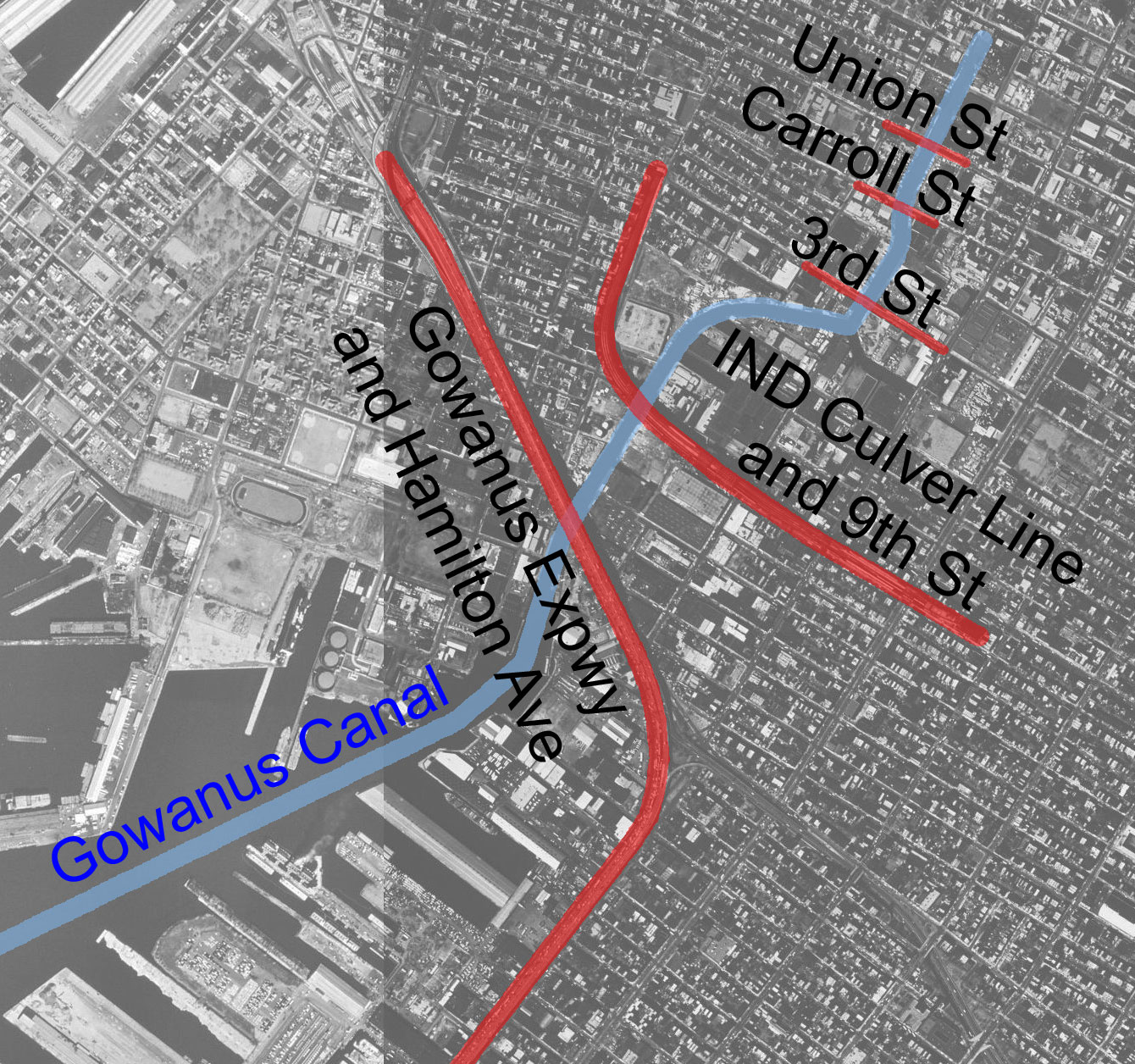
The outside Artyard, in the center is the empty block on the left side of the Gowanus Canal (blue line), directly above the large building adjacent to 9th Street (bottom center), and west of the IND Culver Line viaduct (red line).

In 1979 Frank Shifreen, a recent art graduate of Pratt Institute, began hosting open-studio party art shows at his Brooklyn, New York studio apartment. There a variety of local New York artists began to network. His building, which was a nineteenth-century munitions factory at 230 3rd Street in Gowanus, Brooklyn, had over 9,500 square feet, much of it un-rented. Shifreen asked his landlord to periodically use the un-rented space. The building was right next to the extremely polluted Gowanus Canal, was also just two blocks from a five-acre abandoned dump that had been classified as a city-owned "Public Site". At Smith Street and 5th Street, it was filled with weeds, trash middens, and expired auto bodies.

== The Monumental Show (1981) ==
Shifreen teamed up with artists Michael Keene and George Moore to plan an art exhibition using both the empty space in the munitions factory and the public space next door. They enlisted help from the Gowanus Canal Community Development Corporation and Carroll Gardens Association, also receiving a $1500 grant from the Brooklyn Council on the Arts.

Calling themselves the Gowanus Canal Memorial Artyard, they began wheatpasting posters throughout the city six months before the show, calling it The Monumental Show. The black-and-white posters were a call for entries, and they received thousands of proposals for live rock music performances and art installations. The organizers selected 150 artists who were each given a 20 by 20-foot space to create their art. The theme of the exhibition was monumental art, which consisted of paintings, sculptures, mixed media, and anything one-and-a-half times normal size. The participants included new talent, as well as established artists such as Carl Andre and Andy Warhol-sponsored Keith Haring.

=== Reception ===
The show opened on May 16, 1981, and more than 4000 people visited just that first weekend to see the art and hear live music. As a result of the show, Shifreen's landlord had him arrested for allegedly stealing electricity, and the ensuing controversy increased the press the show was already receiving. On June 8, 1981, New York Magazine did an article on the show entitled "Gowanus Guerrillas", calling it "the event of the season." On June 15, 1981, the show made the cover of the New York Daily News.

=== Controversy ===
One artist, the young Laura Foreman, contributed an installation she called "Roomwork" to the interior of the munitions factory. However, Shifreen's landlord, the police, and then reportedly violent local members of the Jewish Defense League took offense to her exhibit's inclusion of a painting of Hitler. A few days after the opening, members of the Jewish Defense League entered the exhibit and slashed another painting by Komar and Melamid, the show closing down soon after.

== The Monument Redefined (1982) ==
Poster seen around New York

After the success of the first, Shifreen and artist Scott Siken began organizing a second show. Entitled The Monument Redefined, the 1982 show was held in three locations. The outdoor site covered twelve acres with artwork visible from the window of the Culver subway. The space for the two indoor sites was donated by the Downtown Brooklyn Cultural Center, while sponsors included the Department of Parks and Recreation, the Decentralization Program of the New York State Council on the Arts, The City of New York, Con Edison, the F.W. Woolworth Company, and the Organization of Independent Artists.

The stated theme of the exhibition was not size, but social responsibility. The call-for-entries was again a poster, but also free ads from Artforum, Arts, and ARTnews, and thousands of artists submitted entrees. The co-curators selected 400 proposals, including works by well-known artists such as Carl Andre, Christo, Vito Acconci, Nancy Holt, the controversial Chris Burden, Dennis Oppenheim, Nancy Spero, Leon Golub, Boaz Vaadia, TODT, sculptor Jim Nickel, and Fred Wilson. Some of the co-jurors were Marcia Tucker, the director of the New Museum, Henry Geldzahler, the New York City Cultural Commissioner, and Mary Boone, the gallery owner.

=== Reception ===
As before, the show was a success, with multiple art publications publishing reviews. Three panel discussions were held at Cooper Union, and artists as well as art critics took part. On October 3, 1982, there was a review in The New York Times.

== Gowanus Canal Redefined (1982) ==
The Monument Redefined was welcomed by much of the local Gowanus, Brooklyn, community. Buddy Scotto and James Albano of the Gowanus Community Development Program contacted the Gowanus Memorial Artyard to offer a sponsorship for an architectural competition. Called The Gowanus Canal Redefined, it was one of the only grassroots contests of its kind. Frank Shifreen and Scott Siken of the Gowanus Memorial Artyard organized and curated the event, selecting proposals for "critical reinterpretations" of the Gowanus Canal. A $1000 prize was to be awarded to the best architectural proposal for revitalizing the Gowanus Canal area. The area, a former industrial zone, was suffering from extreme neglect in the early 1980s. The Canal running through the area is currently dubbed a Super fund site. The area's seawater canal, open park spaces, and close proximity to Manhattan and public transportation were requested to be incorporated into the proposal designs.

The show ran from October 18, 1982, to October 29, 1982, and included participants Todd Ayoung, Dennis Joyce, Stephen Korns, Joe Lewis, Brian McMahon, and Kristin Steen.

== Historical significance ==
The show was one of several mega-shows in the early 1980s. Before the show, the public Times Square Show exhibition had nightly art performances every night for months, and in the two years after that there were several large-scale exhibitions in disused buildings in public locations. One was Ninth Street Survival at an abandoned school on the Lower East Side of Manhattan, as well as the Coney Island Show on a pier at the Coney Island Amusement Park. Several New York artists, including Shifreen and Julius Vitali, have theorized that the East Village, Manhattan art movement in the 1980s may have resulted partly from the artist-organized and not-for-profit shows of the early 1980s, including The Monumental Show and Monument Redefined. The shows made it possible for art galleries and art dealers to find and support emerging artists.

== See also ==
- Monumental sculpture
- Public art
