= John M. Broughton =

British psychologist

- Born: London, England
- Citizenship: British
- Education: Cambridge University, Harvard University
- Scientific career
- Fields: Psychologist
- Workplaces: Teachers College, Columbia University
- Doctoral students: Frank Shifreen

John M. Broughton is an American psychologist and professor who specialises in cultural studies, media and visual culture, youth culture, popular culture, gender, and violence. Broughton graduated from Cambridge University with both a BA and Masters of Arts, later earning his PhD at Harvard University. He became an associate professor of Psychology and Education at the Teachers College at Columbia University in 1976, and continues to hold the position.

== Early life and education ==
Broughton was raised in a small village 15 miles south of London. His parents were organizers of their community's film society, and he "grew up as a Cinema Paradiso projector boy". He later spent six influential years in the UK's Reserve Officers' Training Corps, where he became an expert on explosives and hand grenades. He claimed the experience increased his interest in the military aspects of culture and graphic imagery used to justify war.

After a short period pursuing a career in journalism, Broughton began studying psychology at Cambridge University. While there he earned both his BA and Master of Arts degrees. After graduating from Cambridge he moved from England to the United States, where he earned his PhD at Harvard University. While at Harvard he partly focused his studies on the world-views and moral development of adolescents. His unpublished doctoral dissertation was titled The Development of Natural Epistemology in Adolescence and Early Adulthood.

== Teachers College, Columbia University ==
Broughton became an associate professor of Psychology and Education at the Teachers College at Columbia University in 1976 and continues to hold the position. When Teachers College underwent departmental reorganisation in the mid-1990s, Broughton retained his title but moved to the Department of Arts and Humanities, where he expanded classroom techniques to include the use of music, advertising, magazines, video games, television, and the internet. His classes often cover cultural studies, media and visual culture, youth culture, popular culture, gender, and violence. In October 1999 Broughton co-ordinated a conference at Teachers College titled "Children, Culture and Violence". The conference brought together experts on school violence, and was sponsored by Teacher's College, Adelphi University, Long Island University, and the Glass Institute for Basic Psychoanalytic Research. Most presentations addressed the roots of violence and finding ways to break the cycle. Some of his students organised the first national conference on Cultural Studies and Education, which was held at Teachers College. In June 2003 Broughton contributed several works to Columbia doctoral student and curator Frank Shifreen's art exhibit Art Against War. The exhibition featured posters analysing war from over 14 countries. Broughton co-founded the "Film and Education Research Center" with doctoral advisee Kelvin Shawn Sealey. FERA is now a part of the Center for Educational Outreach and Innovation at Teachers College, and its stated mission is to explore the interplay between cinema, teaching, and learning. It is a research, publishing, and teaching project. On 26 March 2004, FERA hosted actor and scholar Cornel West of The Matrix Reloaded and The Matrix Revolutions at Teachers College to give a program entitled Film & Education: The Matrix of the Possible. In April 2005, Sealey again worked with Broughton to organise Project Citizen, a series of academic film discussions in talk show format.

== As expert ==
Broughton has been quoted as an expert on psychology and media culture in several national publications, including The Observer in 2001, New York Daily News in 2003, the Star-Telegram in 2004, the Baltimore Sun in 2006, and ABC News in 2007.

== Selected publications ==
- Critical Theories of Psychological Development (Plenum Press)
- "Smart weapons and military TV" (Technoscience and Cyberculture)
- "The experience of the father" (Insights)
- "Hollywood ultraviolence as educator" (Psychoanalysis and Education)
- "What the transgender child teaches us." (Bank Street College Occasional Papers)
- Beyond Formal Operations: Theoretical Thought in Adolescence (1997, Teachers College Record, Volume 79)
