= AVANT =

AVANT, also known as AVANT street art guerrilla collective, was the artist group active in New York City from 1980 to 1984. By 1984 AVANT had produced thousands of acrylic on paper paintings and plastered them on walls, doors, bus-stops and galleries citywide. Principal artists were Christopher Hart Chambers, David Fried, and Marc Thorne.

== History and street presence ==
AVANT was a group of five young New York artists working collectively who wheat pasted handmade original poster sized works of non-calligraphic art in the streets of NYC. While the members of Avant assert that they began in the winter of 1980, the earliest available press documentation of their street art or art exhibitions is found in the New York Native from June 1982, wherein a later article published in the Villager places their origins at January 1981. By 1984 avant had produced thousands of acrylic on paper paintings and plastered them on walls, doors, bus-stops, galleries and museums citywide, concentrated mostly in lower Manhattan. As a group, they were capable of producing hundreds of individual paintings per week, and deployed them in the streets on a regular basis. They also mounted three-dimensional artworks to street sign poles and commandeered bus stop advertising light boxes, replacing the contents with their own original works of art, then relocking the cabinets.

== Exhibitions ==
Over 40 exhibitions of AVANT's work were held in New York galleries and nightclubs between 1981 and 1984. Over a typical artist-gallery financial dispute, they actually managed to commandeer a gallery in SoHo to open the 1982 September season with a self curated exhibition. Another fresh concept was to start an exhibition in the street that would continue into a gallery. They called this the “Drive-In Show,” which started with a dozen numbered oversized paintings pasted high up on a parking lot wall in Soho, and continued up the block in Gabrielle Bryers Gallery starting with painting number 13.
