= Graeme Sullivan =

Australian artist

- Education: Ohio State University
- Awards: Manual Barkan Memorial Award; 1990; Lowenfeld Award; 2007
- Website: www.StreetWorksArt.com

Graeme Sullivan is an Australian artist, author, art theorist, and educator. He has contributed work to numerous exhibitions and events and is known for his international "Streetworks" project that plants public art in unusual urban locales. He authored the books Art Practice as Research (2005-2010 2nd Ed) and Seeing Australia: Views of Artists and Artwriters (1994). He has served as Senior Editor, Studies in Art Education 2001-2003; Editor of Australian Art Education 1988-1991; Chair, National Art Education Association (NAEA) Research Commission, 2012-2014; elected Distinguished Fellow, NAEA, 2020. Sullivan has taught art at the University of New South Wales's College of Fine Arts, and the Teacher's College at Columbia University. He served as Director of the School of Visual Arts at Pennsylvania State University, 2010-2018.

== Education ==
Sullivan attended Ohio State University in Columbus, Ohio where he earned his Master of Arts in 1982 and later graduated with a PhD in art education in 1984. Sullivan's scholarly interests include visualization in the art process, studio-based research methods and theory for different art disciplines and interdisciplinary settings.

== Artistic career ==
Streetworks (1995–present)

In the early 1990s Sullivan began creating "Streetworks", unique conceptual art pieces built from materials he picked up from gutters and sidewalks. Under the guise of semi-anonymity, he constructs pieces and sometimes exhibits them before installing the artworks in specific sites such as subway stations, abandoned buildings, parks, bridges, and other urban locations and leaves them there. Sullivan's Streetworks first appeared in Sydney. in 1999, followed by Boston (1992), Tokyo (2001), New York City (2002), Bahamas, (2002), Brooklyn (2006, 2014), Venice (2003, 2007, 2019), Beijing (2005).

Exhibitions

Throughout his career Sullivan's art has been featured in numerous shows and exhibitions. In March 2010 Sullivan contributed art pieces to the international traveling exhibit Global Perspectives: Works on Paper. In New York City it displayed in the Broadway Gallery, and also featured such artists as May Stevens. In April 2010 he participated in the exhibition Art is Me, Art is You at the Korean Cultural Center, Los Angeles. The show included a public art walk performance where the artists symbolically 'wore' their artwork.

== Teaching career ==
=== University of New South Wales (1988-1998) ===
In 1988, Sullivan joined the faculty at the University of New South Wales in Kensington, Australia, where he remained for over ten years. He served as a senior lecturer in art education in their College of Fine Arts.

Critical Influence CD (1998)

In 1998, Sullivan produced a CD-ROM entitled Critical Influence: A Visual Arts Research Project, which documented two contemporary artists preparing for an exhibition, and explored the influences and contexts between their separate art practices. Made while at the University of New South Wales, it was intended to accompany an exhibition called Critical Influence at the Ivan Dougherty Gallery in February and March 1998.

=== Columbia University (1999-2009) ===
In January 1999, Sullivan departed from the University of New South Wales to join the faculty in the Department of Arts and Humanities at Teachers College, Columbia University. He served as Chair of the Department of Arts & Humanities, as well as associate professor of art education.

=== Lecturing history ===
InSEA World Congress (2002)

In 2002 Sullivan served on the Congress Executive Committee of InSEA's 31st World Congress in New York City.

On 4 November 2005, Sullivan presented "Research Acts in the Visual Arts" as part of the John M. Anderson Lecture Series at the Pennsylvania State University School of Visual Arts. Three years later, on 7 and 8 March 2008, Sullivan served as a keynote speaker at NYU Steinhardt in Greenwich Village. On 2 February 2009, he was sponsored by the Interdisciplinary Research Group from the College of Visual and Performing Arts at Syracuse University to present the lecture "The Artist as Research Trickster". He presented "Art Practice as Research: New Roles for New Realities" at Moravian College in Bethlehem, Pennsylvania on 11 November 2009. The lecture was part of the Rose and Rudy S. Ackerman Visual Arts Lecture Series.

=== Penn State University (2010-2018) ===
Effective 1 August 2010, Sullivan was appointed director of Pennsylvania State University's School of Visual Arts. He is also a professor of art education at the college. He retired in 2018 and returned to live in Sydney, Australia.

== Writing/editing career ==
Seeing Australia (1994)

Sullivan is the author of Seeing Australia: Views of Artists and Artwriters, a paperback book released on Piper Press in 1994. It was also published as a poster book in 1994, and there was a second reprinting in 1996.

Art Practice as Research (2005, 2010)

In 2005 Sullivan published the book Art Practice as Research: Inquiry in the Visual Arts, which described many of his artistic philosophies on education and research in detail. It was published by SAGE Publications on both paperback and hardback. The book later underwent a major update and revision and a second edition was published early in 2010. His research partly investigates the thinking process, making processes, and practices used in visual arts. He presents the argument that the creative and cultural inquiry undertaken by artists is a form of research.

Articles

Sullivan has written numerous articles focusing on visual research practices in art and education, published in the United States, the United Kingdom, Europe, Australia, and Asia. He has held editorial positions with both Studies in Art Education and Australian Art Education. He is also an editorial board member and consultant to the UK publication International Journal of Art & Design Education, the International Journal of Education and the Arts, and Studies in Material Thinking. He has served as senior editor for Studies in Art Education, the research journal of the NAEA.

He has contributed numerous chapters to books and text books, as well as editorials to peer-reviewed journals such as Studies in Art Education and Australian Art Education. He also contributed articles to Artlink in 1999 and Art in Education in 1988 and 1986.

In 2004 he was listed in Who's Who in America.

== Memberships ==
- National Art Education Association (NAEA)
- Australian Institute of Art Education (conferred life membership in 1997)

== Awards ==
- Manual Barkan Memorial Award 1990 – NAEA (for scholarly writing)
- Ken Marantz Distinguished Alumni Award 1999 – Ohio State University
- Lowenfeld Award 2007 (for significant contribution to the art education profession)

== Bibliography ==
Books

- Seeing Australia: Views of Artists and Artwriters (1994) (ISBN 0958798427)
- Art Practice as Research: Inquiry in the Visual Arts edition 1 (2005) (ISBN 9781412905367)
- Art Practice as Research: Inquiry in the Visual Arts edition 2 (2010) (ISBN 9781412974516)

Authored Chapters

- Contemporary issues in art education for elementary educators (2002), (pp. 23–38)
- Handbook of research and policy in art education (2004), (pp. 795–814)
- Howard Gardner Under Fire: A Rebel Psychologist Faces His Critics (2006) (pp. 198–222)
- International Handbook of Research on Arts Education, Part 2 (2007), (pp. 1181–1194)
- Art Education as Critical Cultural Inquiry, (2007) (pp. 58–74)
- Being with A/r/tography (2007) (pp. 233–244)
- International Handbook of Research on Arts Education, Part 2, (2007) (pp. 1181-1194).
- Handbook of The Arts in Qualitative Research: Perspectives, Methodologies, Examples, and Issues (2008) (pp. 239 – 250)
- Making Space: The Purpose and Place of Practice-Led Research. (2010). (pp.99-117).
- See it again, say it again: The artist as researcher (2011) (pp. 70 – 101).
- Art and Social Justice Education: Culture as Commons, (2012) (pp. 145-149).
- The Heart of Art Education: Essays on Holistic Human Development and Integration, (2012) (pp.16-29).
- Teaching Emergent Research Methodologies in Art Education (2013), (pp.-11-20).
- Teaching artistic research: Conversations across cultures (2020) (pp. 29-41).
