= Ganei Tikva =

Ganei Tikva גַּנֵּי תִּקְוָה
- City council (from 2023)

Hebrew transcription(s)
  - ISO 259: Gannei Tiqwa
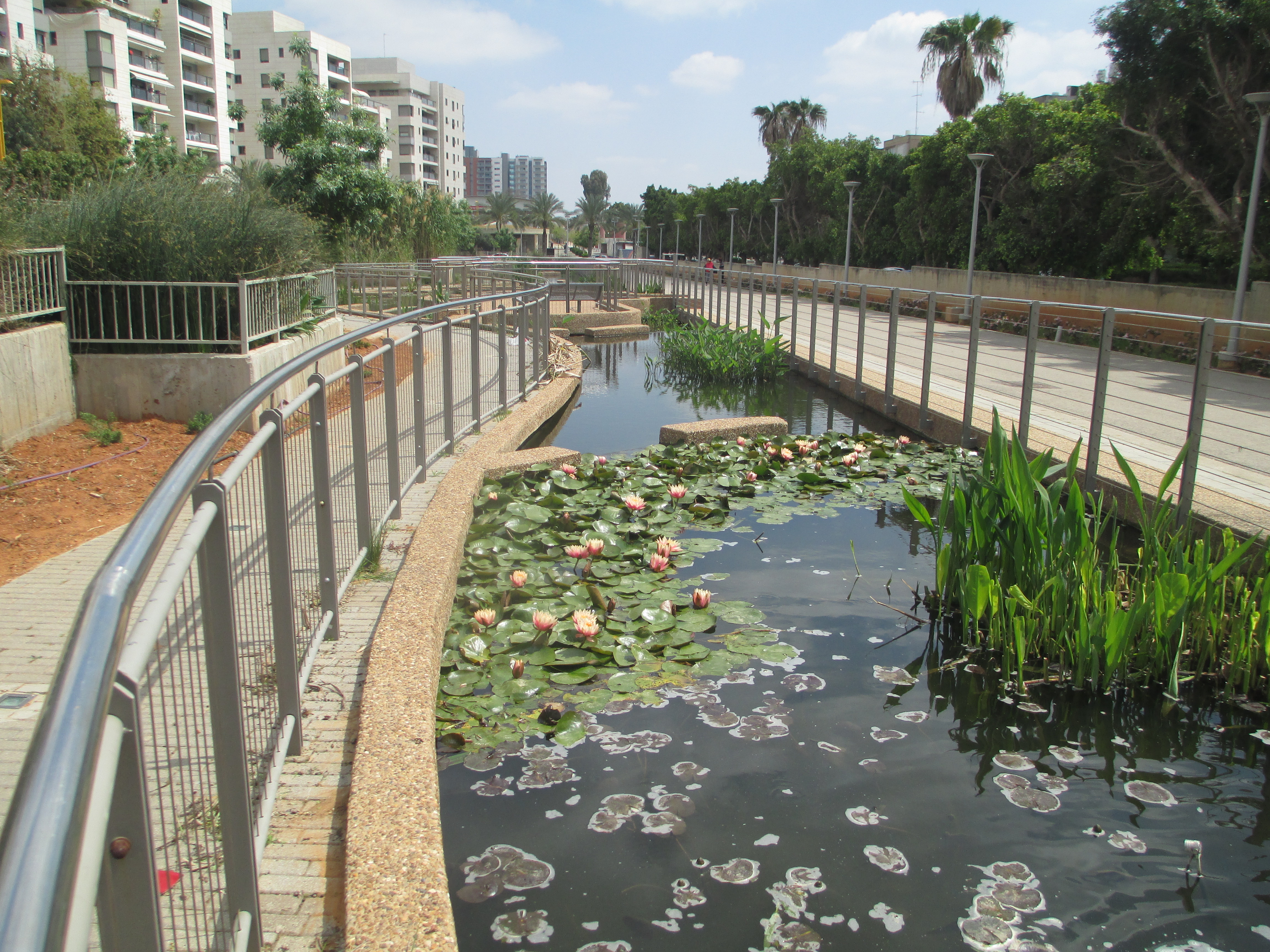

- Location within Central Israel Location within Israel
- Coordinates: 32°03′40″N 34°52′28″E
- Country: Israel
- District: Central
- Subdistrict: Petah Tikva
- Natural Region: Petah Tikva
- Founded: 1949

Government
  - Head of Municipality: Lizy Delaricha

Area
  - Total: 1,842 dunams (1.842 km^{2}; 0.711 sq mi)

Population (2024)
  - Total: 25,488
  - Density: 13,840/km^{2} (35,840/sq mi)
- Name meaning: Gardens of Hope

Ganei Tikva (Hebrew: גַּנֵּי תִּקְוָה, lit. '"gardens of hope"') is a town with "city council" status in Israel bordering Kiryat Ono to the west, Petah Tikva to the north, Gat Rimon to the east and Savyon to the south.

== History ==
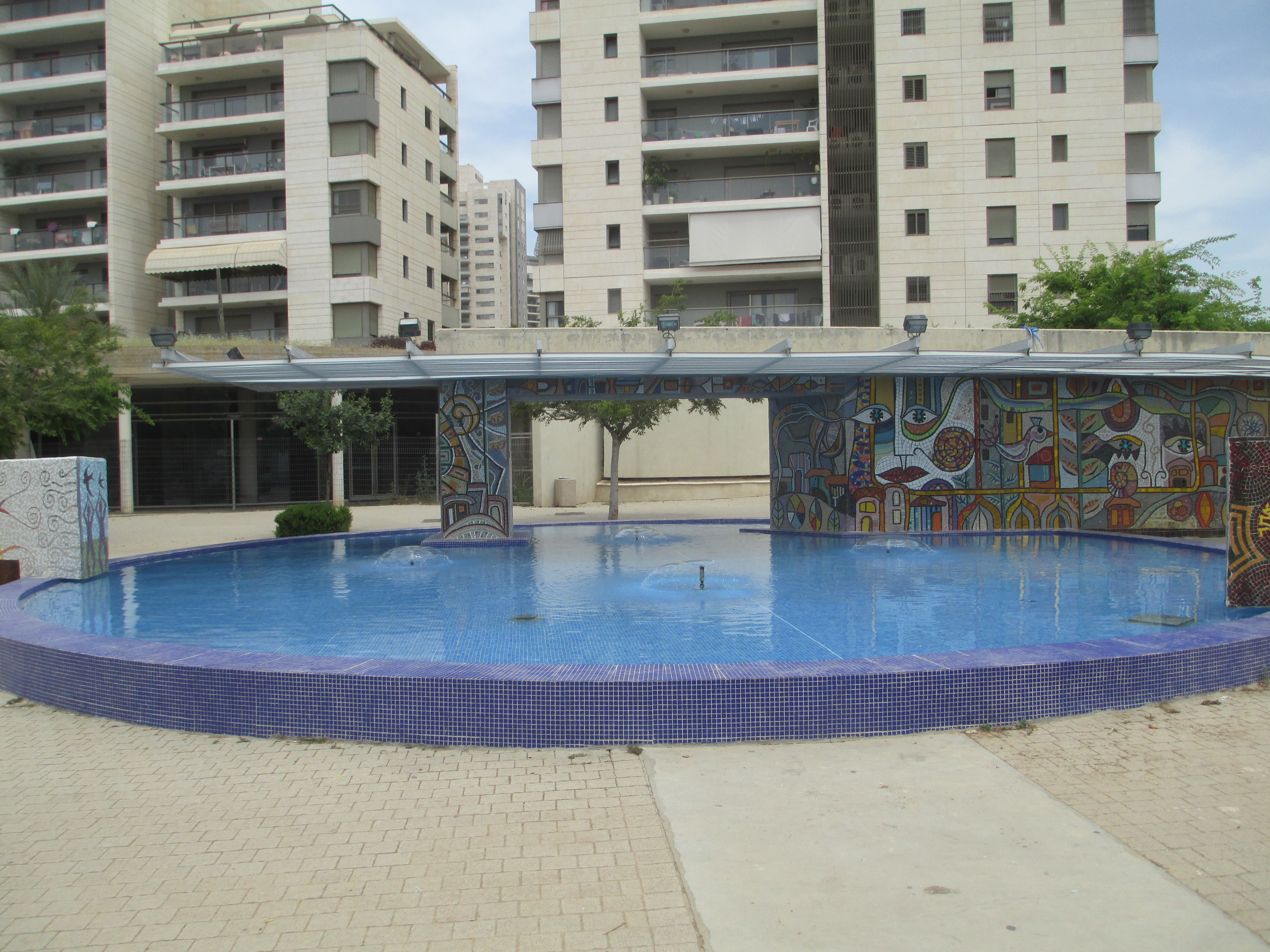

Ganei Tikva was formed in 1949, located on land near the former Palestinian village of Al-'Abbasiyya, which became depopulated in the 1948 Arab–Israeli War.

Shikun Yovel, built in 1949, was the first neighborhood. Ganei Tikva achieved local council status in 1953. Yismach Moshe, a religious neighborhood, was built in 1962. (During Shabbat, Yismach Moshe is closed to traffic). Givat Savyon was built in 1972, and is considered a high-end apartment building neighborhood. In an attempt to duplicate Givat Savyon's success, Givat Savyon HaHadasha neighborhood was formed on the eastern side, bordering Gat Rimon. The latest addition to Ganei Tikva is the residential neighborhood Ganim.

Ganei Tikva is known for its high standard of living and quality education. It is located in close proximity to Tel Aviv and Gush Dan, and is characterized by a diverse ethnic Jewish mix. The urban pattern includes small detached houses, townhouses and apartment buildings, complemented by mature trees and low traffic levels. In 2024 it had a population of 25,488.

== Transportation ==
Ganei Tikva has three access roads. On the west, the main entry to Ganei Tikva through Kiryat Ono. This is the preferred entry to Tel Aviv. On the east, through Gat Rimon which allows fast entry to Petah Tikva and Highway 6 through Route 471.

== Education ==
There are five elementary schools (including special education), one junior high school ("Harishonim junior high"), and one high school ("Meitar high school") in Ganei Tikva. Ganei Tikva has won the National Education Award for 2007.

== Voting Patterns ==
In the 2022 election, 61 percent of voters in Ganei Tikva voted for the parties of the center-left coalition led by Yair Lapid, while 36 percent voted for the parties of the right-wing coalition led by Benjamin Netanyahu and 0.2 percent voted for the Arab parties.

In the 2026 election, 65 percent of voters in Ganei Tikva voted for the parties of the center-left coalition led by Gadi Eisenkot, while 30 percent voted for the parties of the right-wing coalition led by Benjamin Netanyahu and 0.2 percent voted for the Arab parties. An additional 3.4 percent voted for the Reservists, and 1.7 percent voted for Amcha Yisrael. Voter turnout increased 18 percent from the 2022 election.
