= Keno Auctions =

- Founded: 2009
- Founder: Leigh Keno
- Website: kenoauctions.com

Keno Auctions, founded in 2009 by celebrity antiques dealer Leigh Keno, is a full-service auction house in New York City.

Specializing in fine and decorative art, as well as antiques and collectibles, Keno Auctions has become popular among collectors, dealers, and enthusiasts seeking a certain kind of pieces.

Keno Auctions was founded in 2009 by Leigh Keno, a well-known antiques expert and television personality, who has appeared on PBS's "Antiques Roadshow" and hosted his own series "Buried Treasure" on FOX.
