= Gat Rimon =

Moshav in central Israel

Gat Rimon: גַּת רִמּוֹן (Hebrew)
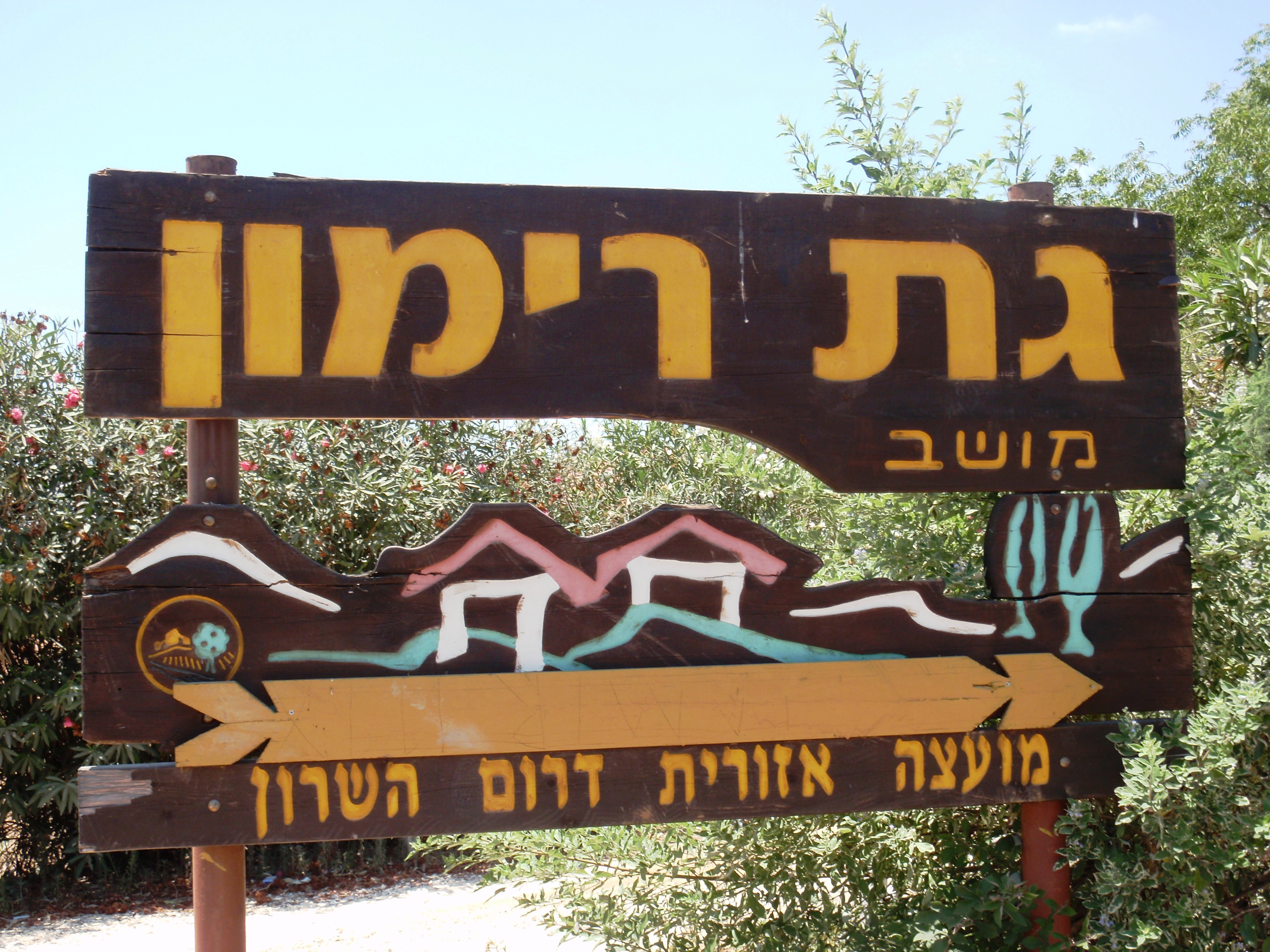

- Location within Central Israel
- Coordinates: 32°4′4″N 34°52′49″E
- Country: Israel
- District: Central
- Subdistrict: Petah Tikva
- Council: Drom HaSharon
- Founded: 1926
- Founder: Workers from Petah Tikva
- Population (2024): 268

Gat Rimon (Hebrew: גַּת רִמּוֹן, lit. Pomegranate press) is a moshav in central Israel. Located in the Ono Valley in the Sharon plain between Ganei Tikva and Petah Tikva, it falls under the jurisdiction of Drom HaSharon Regional Council. In 2024 it had a population of 268.

== History ==
The moshav was founded in 1926 by workers from Petah Tikva who were children of middle class immigrants of the Fourth Aliyah. It was initially called HaTehiya (Hebrew: התחייה, lit. Revival), but later took the Biblical name of Gat Rimmon, a Levite town in the land of the Tribe of Dan which is mentioned in Joshua 19:45. The Biblical town is "identified with Tel Gerisa" near the Yarkon river in the north of Tel Aviv by the archaeologist Benjamin Mazar. According to the 1931 census Gat Rimon had a population of 142 Jews, in 30 houses.
