= Ben =

Male given name

- Gender: Male

Origin
- Origin: Semitic languages
- Meaning: "Son of"
- Region of origin: Middle East

Other names
- Related names: Benjamin, Benedict, Bengt, Bennett, Benoit, Benvolio, Benito, Benson, Ebenezer

Ben is a masculine given name. It is often short for Benjamin, Benedict, Bennett, Benson, and Ebenezer.

Ben meaning "son of" is also found in Arabic as Ben or bin (بن) (dialectal Arabic) and in Hebrew (Rabbi Ishmael ben Elisha). During the past periods of classical Arabic, Ibn/ebn (ابن) was used in Arabic names exclusively while ben appeared only in Jewish names.

Ben (賁/便嗯) is a Chinese surname.

== People with the given name ==
- Ben Adams (born 1981), member of the British boy band A1
- Ben Affleck (born 1972), American Academy Award-winning actor and screenwriter
- Ben Ashkenazy (born 1968/69), American billionaire real estate developer
- Ben Askren (born 1984), American sport wrestler and mixed martial artist
- Ben Axtman (born 1933), American politician
- Ben Bailey (born 1970), American comedian and game show host
- Ben Banogu (born 1996), American football player
- Ben Barba (born 1989), Australian rugby player
- Ben Barnes (disambiguation), multiple people
- Ben Bartch (born 1998), American football player
- Ben Bartlett (1965–2026), British composer
- Ben Becker (born 1964), German actor
- Ben Bentil (born 1995), Ghanaian basketball player for Hapoel Tel Aviv of the Israeli Basketball Premier League
- Ben Bernanke (born 1953), American chair of the Federal Reserve Bank
- Ben Bishop (born 1986), American ice hockey player
- Ben Bradlee (1921–2014), American newspaper editor
- Ben Braun (born 1953), American basketball coach
- Ben Bredeson (born 1999), American football player
- Ben Browder (born 1962), American actor
- Ben Burman (1896–1984), American author
- Ben Burr-Kirven (born 1997), American football player
- Ben Cardin (born 1943), American lawyer and former politician
- Ben Carson (born 1951), American surgeon and politician
- Ben Carter (disambiguation), multiple people
- Ben Chase (1923–1998), American football player
- Ben Chilwell (born 1996), English footballer
- Ben Chiu (born 1970), Taiwanese-American and Canadian computer programmer
- Ben Chiu (Hong Kong singer) (born 1997), Hong Kong dancer
- Ben Chukwuma (born 2001), Nigerian-American football player
- Ben Cleveland (born 1998), American football player
- Ben Clime (1891–1973), American football player
- Ben Cohen (disambiguation), multiple people
- Ben Coleman (disambiguation), multiple people
- Ben Collins, American screenwriter
- Ben Cousins (born 1978), Australian rules footballer
- Ben Crenshaw (born 1952), American golfer
- Ben Crompton (born 1974), English actor
- Ben Cross (1947–2020), English actor
- Ben Curtis (disambiguation), multiple people
- Ben Cutting (born 1987), Australian cricketer
- Ben Daley (born 1988), Australian rugby player
- Ben Davis (born 2000), Thai footballer
- Ben DiNucci (born 1996), American football player
- Ben Domenech (born 1982), American news commentator, publisher of The Federalist
- Ben Eager (born 1984), Canadian ice hockey player
- Ben Edwards (disambiguation), multiple people
- Ben Eisenhardt (born 1990), American-Israeli basketball player
- Ben Ellefson (born 1996), American football player
- Ben Fayot (born 1937), Luxembourgish politician
- Ben Feldman (born 1980), American actor
- Ben Ferencz (1920–2023), American lawyer
- Ben Fergusson (born 1980), British writer
- Ben Folami (born 1999), Australian footballer
- Ben Ford (chef) (born 1966), American chef
- Ben Folds (born 1966), American singer-songwriter
- Ben Fordham (born 1976), Australian journalist, sports reporter and radio presenter
- Ben Franklin (1706–1790), Prominent figure in the American Revolution
- Ben Garland (born 1988), American football player
- Ben Gedeon (born 1994), American football player
- Ben Gibbard (born 1976), American lead singer of Death Cab for Cutie
- Ben Gibson (born 1993), English footballer
- Ben Gillies (born 1979), Australian drummer of Silverchair
- Ben Godfrey (born 1998), English footballer
- Ben Goldsmith (musician), American singer-songwriter
- Ben Gordon (born 1983), British-born American basketball player
- Ben Gottschalk (born 1992), American football player
- Ben Guez (born 1987), American baseball player
- Ben Hannant (born 1984), Australian rugby player
- Ben Hardy (disambiguation), multiple people
- Ben Harper (born 1969), American musician
- Ben Harrison (1833-1901), 23rd U.S. President
- Ben Harvey (disambiguation), multiple people
- Ben Herbert (born 1979), American football coach and former player
- Ben Hogan (1912–1997), American golfer
- Ben Helfgott (1929–2023), Polish-born British weightlifter
- Ben Howard (born 1987), British singer/songwriter
- Ben Hunt (disambiguation), multiple people
- Ben Jackson (disambiguation), multiple people
- Ben Jeby (1909–1985), American boxer
- Ben Jelen (born 1979), American singer
- Ben Johns (born 1999), American professional pickleball player
- Ben Johnson (disambiguation), multiple people
- Ben Jonson (1572–1637), English poet
- Ben Kane (born 1970), English novelist
- Ben Kasica, American musician, lead guitarist for Skillet
- Ben Keays (born 1997), Australian rules footballer
- Ben E. King (1938–2015), American soul and R&B singer
- Ben Kingsley (born 1943), British actor
- Ben Kinsella (1991–2008), British murder victim
- Ben Knapen (born 1951), Dutch politician and journalist
- Ben Kramer (1913–1999), American basketball player
- Ben Kudrna (born 2003), American baseball player
- Ben Kweller (born 1981), American rock musician
- Ben Labrosse (born 1999), Canadian football player
- Ben Lane (born 1997), English badminton player
- Ben Laughlin, American ten-pin bowler
- Ben Lawson (born 1980), Australian actor
- Ben Leber (born 1978), American football player
- Ben Lord, American drummer
- Ben Lowe (born 1985), Australian rugby player
- Ben Lundgaard (born 1995), American soccer player
- Ben Mann (born 2002), American football player
- Ben Mason (disambiguation), multiple people
- Ben Mendelsohn (born 1969), Australian actor
- Ben Miller (born 1966), English actor and comedian
- Ben Moody (born 1981), American musician
- Ben Moore (born 1995), American basketball player
- Ben Roy Mottelson (1926–2022), Danish American physicist
- Ben Mulroney (born 1976), Canadian television personality
- Ben Murdoch-Masila (born 1991), New Zealand rugby player
- Ben Navarro (born 1962/1963), American billionaire, founder and CEO of Sherman Financial Group
- Ben Needham (1989–1991), British infant who disappeared in Greece
- Ben Needham (American football), American football linebacker
- Ben Nicholson (1894–1982), English artist
- Ben Nighthorse Campbell (1933–2025), American and Northern Cheyenne politician and rancher
- Ben Niemann (born 1995), American football player
- Ben Ownby, American kidnap victim
- Ben J. Pierce (born 1999), American YouTuber, singer-songwriter, and actor
- Ben Platt (born 1993), American actor and singer-songwriter
- Ben Plucknett (1954–2002), American discus thrower
- Ben Powers (American football) (born 1997), American football player
- Ben Ray Luján (born 1972), American politician
- Ben Richards (disambiguation), multiple people
- Ben Roethlisberger (born 1982), American football player
- Ben Sahar (born 1989), Israeli footballer
- Ben Saraf (born 2006), Israeli basketball player
- Ben Sasse (born 1972), American academic administrator and politician
- Ben Sauls (born 2001), American football player
- Ben Schwartz (born 1981), American actor
- Ben Selvin (1898–1980), American jazz musician and bandleader
- Ben Shneiderman (born 1947), American computer scientist
- Ben Shapiro (born 1984), American conservative political commentator
- Ben Sheets (born 1978), American baseball player
- Ben Silverman (golfer) (born 1987), Canadian golfer
- Ben Simm (disambiguation), multiple people, including Sim, Sims, Simms
- Ben Simmons (born 1996), Australian basketball player
- Ben Sinnott (born 2002), American football player
- Ben Skowronek (born 1997), American football player
- Ben Smith (disambiguation), multiple people
- Ben T H So (born 1990), apprentice horse racing jockey
- Ben Spijkers (born 1961), Dutch judoka
- Ben Stein (born 1944), American law professor, economist, writer and actor
- Ben Stiller (born 1965), American actor, writer and director
- Ben Stokes (born 1991), English cricketer born in New Zealand
- Ben Swagerman (born 1959), Dutch politician
- Ben Talley (born 1972), American football player
- Ben Templeton (born 1940), American co-creator of the comic strip Motley's Crew
- Ben Te'o (born 1987), New Zealand rugby player
- Ben Thatcher (born 1975), English footballer
- Ben Tulfo (born 1955), Filipino television and radio personality
- Ben Underwood (disambiguation), multiple people
- Ben Unwin (1977–2019), Australian actor
- Ben Vautier (1935–2024), French artist
- Ben Verweij (1895–1951), Dutch footballer
- Ben Wallace (born 1974), American basketball player
- Ben Wanger (born 1997), American-Israeli baseball pitcher, Team Israel
- Ben Way (born 1980), English entrepreneur
- Ben Whishaw (born 1980), English actor
- Ben Whitehead (born 1977), English actor and voice actor
- Ben Wiegers, Dutch curling coach
- Ben Wildman-Tobriner (born 1984), American swimmer
- Ben Willbond (born 1973), British actor
- Ben Wilson (disambiguation), multiple people
- Ben Woodburn (born 1999), Welsh footballer
- Ben Wooldridge (born 1999), American football player
- Ben Yurosek (born 2002), American football player
- Ben (South Korean singer) (born 1991), South Korean singer

== Fictional characters ==
- Ben, a character in the 2019 Canadian horror comic series Witch Creek Road
- Ben, a character in the 2007 Canadian-American television series Sushi Pack
- Ben, a character in the 2009 American romantic comedy-drama movie He's Just Not That Into You
- Ben, minor character of The Grudge 3
- Ben, Bill's twin brother in The Railway Series and the spinoff TV series Thomas and Friends
- Ben, a rat in the novel Ratman's Notebooks, films Willard and Ben, and theme song sung by Michael Jackson on his LP Ben
- Ben, or Benny, the "1980-something space guy" from The Lego Movie
- 🅱️en, or Pen, a character from the first season of Battle for Dream Island, an animated web series. Pen revealed that his legal name is 🅱️en in BFB 5.
- Old Ben, a bear at the center of the William Faulkner story The Bear
- Gentle Ben, a bear featured in an eponymous 1965 novel, and in television and movie adaptations
- Talking Ben, a brown dog and a protagonist of the Talking Tom & Friends media franchise
- Ben Bigger, a playable character from the video game Zenless Zone Zero
- Ben Cartwright, character from western TV series Bonanza
- Ben Elf, the titular protagonist in the British cartoon Ben and Holly's Little Kingdom
- Benjamin Florian/Ben, a protagonist of the Descendants franchise (2015–2019)
- Ben C. L. / Soldier Boy, major character in the third season of The Boys
- Ben Geller-Willick-Bunch, the son of Ross Geller and Carol and Susan in NBC sitcom Friends
- Ben Grimm, also known as the Thing, from Marvel Comics
- Ben Gunn, from Robert Louis Stevenson's Treasure Island
- Ben Hammil (Match), a mutant in the Marvel Universe
- Ben Hargreeves, main character in the comic book/Netflix series The Umbrella Academy
- Ben Harper, major character in the comedy series My Family
- Ben Kenobi, an alias of Obi-Wan Kenobi, major character in the film saga, Star Wars
- Ben Lawman/BEN, an antagonist of the Ben Drowned series (2010–20)
- Ben Nooper, a coastguard and supporting character in the animated series Fireman Sam
- Ben Packer, one of the five main protagonists in Bureau of Alien Detectors
- Ben Parker, the uncle of Peter Parker (Spider-Man) from Marvel Comics
- Ben Richards, main character of The Running Man
- Ben Ripley, a major protagonist of the young-adult series, Spy School
- Ben Skywalker, a major character in the Star Wars expanded universe
- Ben Solo, major character in the Star Wars sequel trilogy
- Ben Stone, a father in the TV series Manifest
- Ben Taylor, from Postman Pat
- Ben Tennyson, protagonist of the Cartoon Network's Ben 10 media franchise
- Ben Urich, investigative journalist for The Daily Bugle in the Marvel Universe
- Ben Wyatt, character from Parks and Recreation
- Ben Wheeler, the lead character of the American sitcom Baby Daddy
- Ben Clover, background character in the Backrooms

== See also ==
- All pages containing Ben
