= Axtman =

Axtman is an Anglicized surname, a variant of Axtmann; the latter is the German occupational surname related to axes (axe maker, woodcutter, carpenter). The surname Axt is of the same origin. Notable people with this surname include:

- Ben Axtman (born 1933), American politician from North Dakota
- Elizabeth Axtman (born 1980), American artist
- Michelle Axtman, American politician from North Dakota
