= AHT =

AHT may refer to:

- American Hairless Terrier
- Aldershot railway station, UK, National Rail code

Aht may refer to:

- Nuu-chah-nulth people

== See also ==
- Acht (disambiguation)
- Axt (disambiguation)
