= Matan Zangauker (hostage) =

Israeli former Hamas hostage (born 1999)

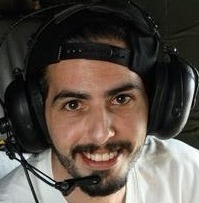
- Zangauker in October 2025
- Born: December 18, 1999 (age 26); Ofakim, Israel
- Known for: Being held hostage in the Gaza Strip from 2023 to 2025

Matan Zangauker (Hebrew: מתן צנגאוקר; born December 18, 1999) is an Israeli civilian who was abducted from Nir Oz during the 7 October Hamas-led attack on Israel in 2023. He was held hostage in the Gaza Strip for 738 days and was released on 13 October 2025 as part of an Israel–Hamas ceasefire agreement.

== Early life ==
Matan Zangauker was born on 18 December 1999. Zangauker met his partner, Ilana Gritzewsky, while working at a medical cannabis farm. Zangauker and Gritzewsky lived together for about a year and a half in the kibbutz of Nir Oz, until they were abducted from there on the morning of October 7.

== Abduction ==
On 7 October 2023, during the Nir Oz attack, Zangauker and Gritzewsky were at their home when the kibbutz was attacked. While they were in their safe room, Zangauker contacted his mother in Ofakim and told her via text message that terrorists were in their house; his mother reassured him that "Everything will be okay, my prince". They escaped from the safe room through a window and ran in different directions before being captured separately and taken to the Gaza Strip. The kibbutz had been attacked by several hundred terrorists who outnumbered the 385 residents of Nir Oz present during the siege. 41 residents were killed and another six who had fled the site of the Nova music festival massacre; Zangauker was one of 76 residents abducted into Gaza.

Gritzewsky was released on 30 November 2023 after 55 days in captivity, while Zangauker remained in Gaza. After her release, Gritzewsky joined Zangauker's mother Einav Zangauker in the public campaign for his release.

== Captivity ==
Zangauker was held in captivity for over two years.

In December 2024, Hamas released a video purportedly showing Zangauker in captivity. In the video, he appealed to Israeli leaders to secure a deal for the release of the hostages. Reuters reported that the Hostage Families Forum regarded the video as proof that he was still alive. ABC News also reported on the video and identified Zangauker as one of the hostages abducted from Nir Oz with Gritzewsky.

=== Conditions and treatment ===
In May 2025, reports based on information received by Zangauker's family described a deterioration in his physical condition. He was reported to have lost substantial weight, suffered from degenerative muscle disease, and experienced prolonged intestinal blockages and severe abdominal pain. According to his family, Zangauker was starved, was given stale bread and rice, and drank contaminated or salty water several times. They also said that he was physically and psychologically abused while in captivity, that he was beaten and kicked, was subjected to interrogations and psychological pressure, his hands and legs were tied, and he was also held in a cage for some time.

Zangauker was reportedly moved between tunnels, mosques and makeshift shelters, sometimes while he was hidden in a crowd of Gazans. One time, he and fellow hostage Edan Alexander were moved through a crowded market while blindfolded, with their captors disguised as women. Zangauker's family said that he survived several tunnel collapses caused by bombardments and that he had spent time in an underground location where other hostages were reportedly killed.

In May 2025, Zangauker's mother Einav said that Israeli soldiers had found a handwritten note bearing her son's name in a Gaza tunnel. According to reports, the note contained Matan's name in Hebrew, English and Arabic, described his condition as “good” and his occupation as “farmer.” Einav also said that she recognized Matan's handwriting. In June, Einav said that Matan survived further bombardments while being held underground and had nearly suffocated from toxic gases after one of the tunnels collapsed.

=== Accounts after his release ===
In a November 2025 television interview, Zangauker gave a detailed account of his captivity. He said he had been moved between tunnels, houses, schools, hospitals, mosques and tent compounds, sometimes with other hostages and sometimes alone. He described being beaten and kicked while being moved through tunnels and said that his captors subjected him to interrogations and psychological pressure. At one point, he said, he was kept in a small cage with another hostage, with two mattresses and a single small blanket; guards would shout at or hit them when they stood up.

Zangauker said that after being taken to the southern Gaza Strip, he was sometimes kept among displaced Palestinians while his captors attempted to conceal his identity. He recalled walking through streets and markets and spending about a week in a mosque before being moved to another tunnel in Rafah. He described the conditions there as cramped and poorly ventilated and said that, when the water supply diminished, the hostages drank dirty water.

He also described violence by his captors. Zangauker recalled one guard beating another hostage with a whip made from electrical cables. After he intervened, he said, the guard beat him as well. He said that his captors also repeatedly filmed him, sometimes for entire days, making him repeat statements and instructing him on what to say.

Zangauker said that during his captivity he eventually learned about his mother's campaign for the release of the hostages. He saw footage of her speaking publicly and realized from television coverage that Gritzewsky had been released. He said that his mother's efforts gave him encouragement while he was being held in Gaza.

Zangauker said after his release that he had initially learned that Gritzewsky had also been abducted, but only discovered that she had been released when he was allowed to watch television on 30 November 2023.

== Efforts to release ==
Following Zangauker's abduction, his mother Einav became a prominent advocate for his release. The international press reported extensively on her campaign. In July 2024, The Washington Post described her participation in protests calling for a hostage-release agreement and reported that she had become a prominent critic of the Israeli government's handling of the hostage crisis.

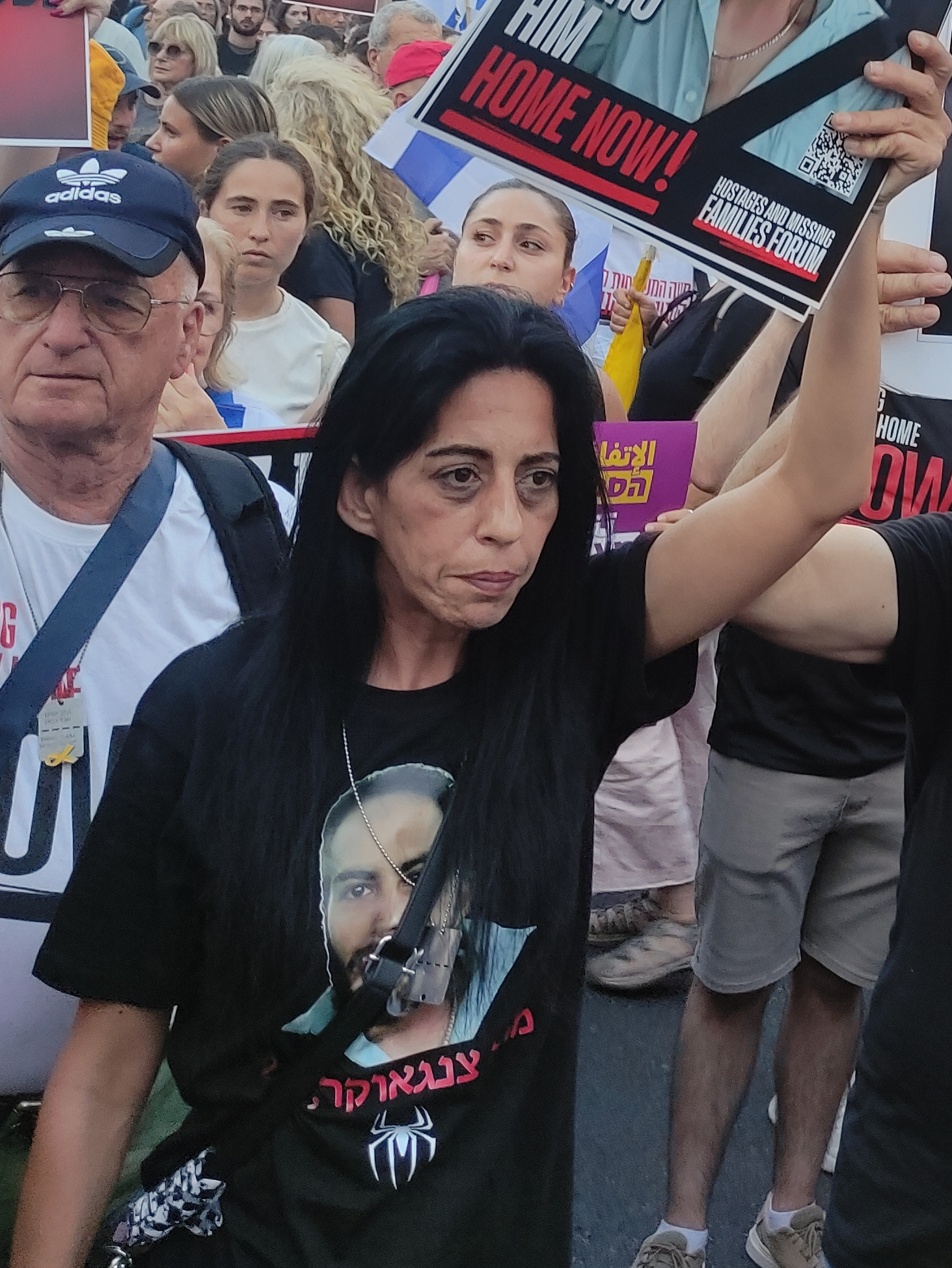
Einav Zangauker, Matan's mother, campaigning for the release of hostages

In May 2024, The Guardian reported that Einav Zangauker was among relatives of hostages demonstrating in Tel Aviv and calling on the government to accept a proposed hostage-release agreement. The report identified Zangauker as her son and one of the hostages still held in Gaza.

In December 2024, she addressed a Knesset committee and demanded that the government take action to secure Zangauker's return. The same month, Hamas published a video showing Zangauker in captivity, in which he referred to his mother's efforts to secure the release of the hostages.

In February 2025, the families of Zangauker and fellow hostage Nimrod Cohen petitioned the Supreme Court of Israel to require the government to publish the full text of the ceasefire and hostage-release agreement and implement all of its phases. The families said they were concerned that the second phase of the agreement, which was expected to include the release of Zangauker and Cohen, could be delayed or not implemented. In the same period, The Washington Post reported that Zangauker's mother was campaigning for her son's release and that his return was expected to depend on the second phase of the ceasefire agreement.

In February 2025, Einav and Gritzewsky traveled to Washington, D.C., where they participated in a rally outside the White House calling on U.S. President Donald Trump to support implementation of the hostage-release agreement. Gritzewsky, who had been released from captivity in November 2023, said she knew what Zangauker was experiencing in captivity.

Hostage poster of Zangauker in Holon, April 2024

In May 2025, Einav said that information provided by released hostage Edan Alexander indicated that Zangauker was still alive. She continued to call for a ceasefire and hostage-release agreement, saying that she feared continued military pressure could endanger his life.

In August 2025, Zangauker's family released previously unseen footage of him from his captivity. The footage was reportedly recorded during the early months of the war and showed Zangauker calling on his family and friends to make their voices heard. The Guardian reported that the release came as hundreds of thousands of Israelis demonstrated in support of a hostage-release agreement and an end to the war.

== Release ==
After not being included in the first two hostage-release deals, Zangauker was released on 13 October 2025 along with the other 19 living Israeli hostages who remained in the Gaza Strip. He had been held for 738 days.

Zangauker meeting his mother, Einav, for the first time upon his release from captivity, October 2025

Zangauker described the moments before his release as marked by complete disbelief. Because he was disappointed on several occasions, for example, in January 2025, he lost hope and believed he would die in Gaza. At first, he thought that the announcement of his release is a lie and yet another psychological tactic used by Hamas.

Following his release, Zangauker was reunited with his mother Einav and other members of his family at a military facility near the Gaza border before being taken to a medical centre in Tel Aviv for treatment. In a statement, his family said that after two years in captivity they were beginning a new chapter focused on healing and rehabilitation. CNN also broadcast footage of the reunion, reporting that Zangauker was embraced by his mother after more than two years apart.

== Post-release activities ==
In November 2025, Zangauker gave his first extended interview after his release. He described his experiences in captivity and said that learning about his mother's campaign for the release of the hostages had given him encouragement while he was being held in Gaza.

Zangauker and Gritzewsky became engaged in December 2025.

In February 2026, Zangauker, Gritzewsky and fellow released hostages Segev Kalfon appeared at the CTeen International Summit in New York City. They led about 4,500 Jewish teenagers in reciting the Shema prayer in Times Square.

== See also ==
- List of Gaza war hostages
- Nir Oz
