= Bar Kupershtein =

Israeli taken hostage by Hamas

- בר קופרשטיין
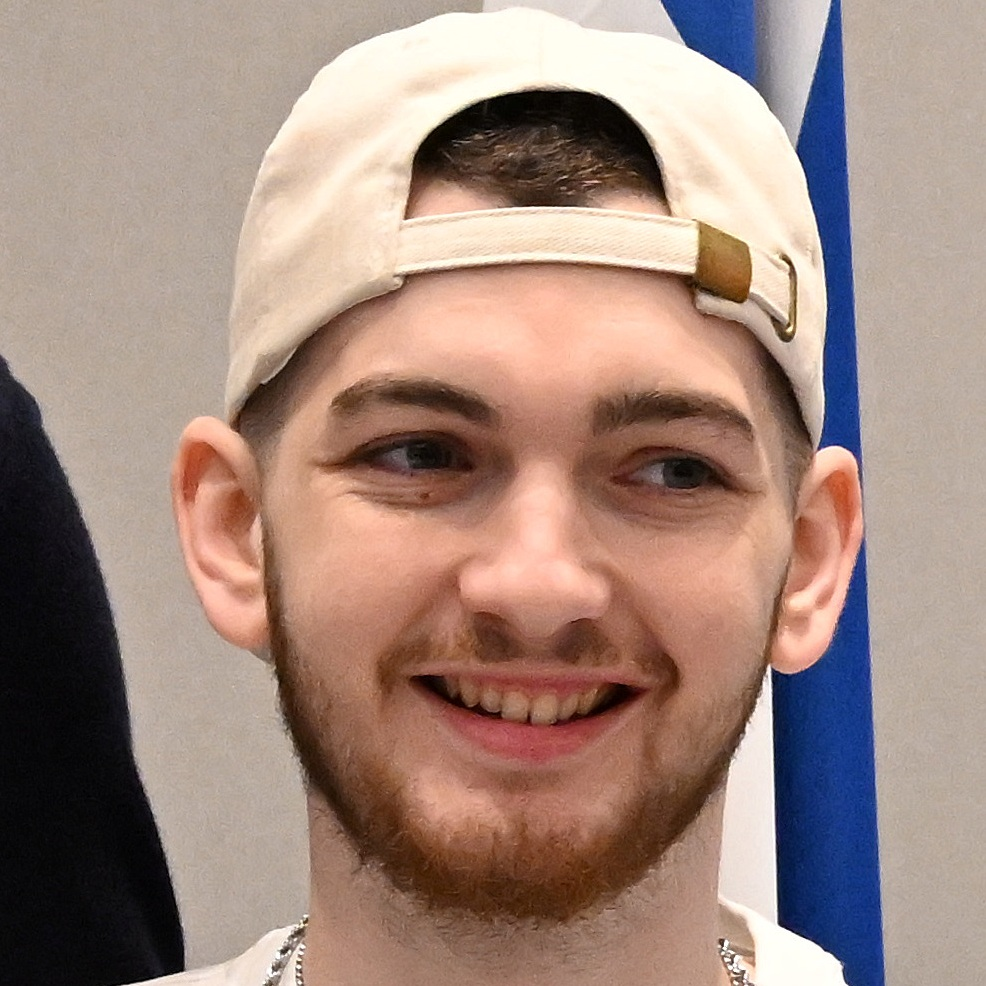
- Kupershtein, following his release (2025)
- Born: April 1, 2002 (age 24); Holon, Israel
- Known for: Hostage in Gaza (2023–2025)

Bar Kupershtein (Hebrew: בר אברהם קופרשטיין; born 1 April 2002) is an Israeli who was abducted by Hamas during the 2023 October 7 attacks while working as a paramedic and security guard at the Supernova music festival. 21-years-old at the time, Kupershtein remained at the site to provide medical assistance to the wounded before he was taken hostage.

On October 13, 2025, after 738 days as a hostage, Kupershtein was released from Hamas captivity and returned to Israel.

== Early life ==
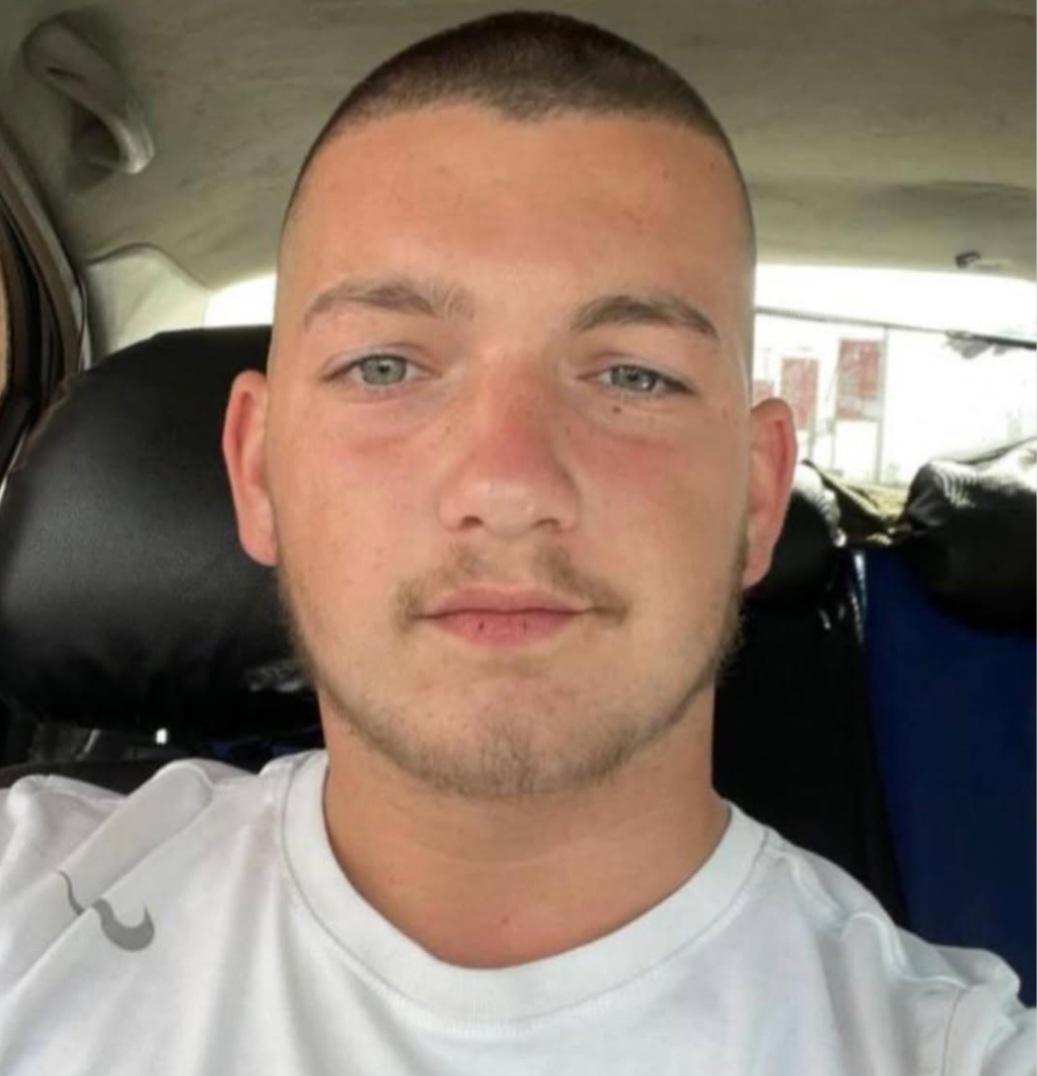
Kupershtein in March 2023, prior to the October 7 attacks

Kupershtein is the eldest of five siblings (3 brothers and 1 sister) and was raised in Holon, Israel. Prior to his abduction, he financially supported his mother, Julie, his father, Tal, and his four younger siblings, by working various jobs and volunteering with the Yedidim emergency assistance organization. It was announced following his release that Kupershtein had been serving in the Israeli Defense Forces (IDF) at the time of his abduction as a combat soldier in the Nahal Brigade's 932nd Battalion.

His father, Tal, also a paramedic, was severely injured three years prior to the 7 October attacks after stopping to assist at a roadside car accident. During subsequent medical treatment, Tal suffered a stroke, which left him permanently disabled and reliant on a wheelchair. Following the stroke, Tal made significant efforts to relearn how to speak in order to advocate publicly for his son's release from captivity.

Bar's grandfather, Michael, is a Holocaust survivor. Born in 1941 in Chișinău in the Soviet Union (now Moldova), he narrowly escaped death at only a few months old when the Nazis invaded the city. After seeing Hamas footage of his severely emaciated grandson in April 2025, Michael called it "a second Holocaust."

== Kidnapping ==
Kupershtein was working at the festival as a security guard and paramedic when Hamas militants launched a massive surprise assault. Kuperstein stayed behind to care for the wounded until he was abducted and taken into Gaza. When the Hamas rockets first landed, Kupershtein told his mother that he was packing up his things and coming back home, but instead, he stayed to help the injured. "He was the one who evacuated the wounded under fire to save lives at the Nova party. He was the one who went back again and again, just to save one more person," Kupershtein's brother told a Knesset Committee.

Kupershtein's family was able to geolocate his cell phone at 8 a.m. on October 7. Several hours later, they found a video and photographs on Telegram of Kupershtein being tied up on the ground. The video depicted Kupershtein bound at his wrists and ankles, with a cord wrapped around his neck, he was recorded shouting his name at the militants and attempting to plead with them to help the wounded Israeli hostage Elkana Bohbot.

== Captivity ==
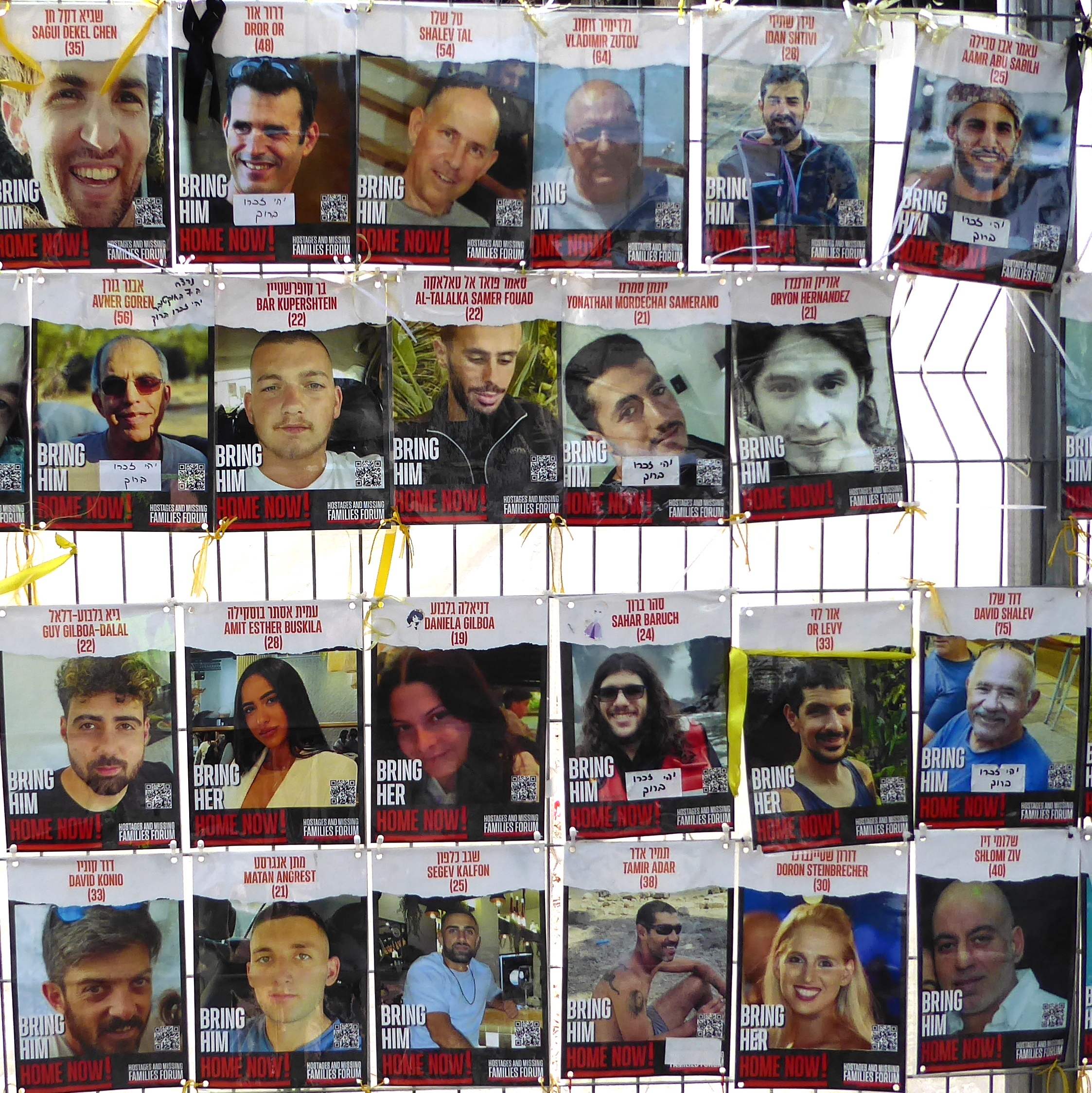
Kidnapped from Israel poster of Bar Kupershtein and other hostages in Ramat Gan in May 2024

In July 2025 the Kupershtein family and the family of hostage Maxim Herkin released a video showing the two that had been released by Hamas three months prior. In the clip the two are recorded stating, "We are dying here with a pulse, we don't feel human... We are again 30 meters underground."

In an interview following his release from Gaza on October 13, 2025, Kupershtein described the psychological warfare and physical abuse he endured in captivity, which included torture and starvation. "I remember there were days when there was food for them, and we had none. They just didn't bring any for us," Kupershtein said following his release. He noted that relative to his captors, "We were getting smaller, and they were getting bigger."

A week after his capture, his kidnappers took him into a room and tortured him. "After a week, I remember they took me to their room, tied me up, of course. When I entered, I got two hard slaps to the face, real ones. I fell to the floor immediately. They dragged me by my legs across the whole room, stomping on me and humiliating me as much as they could," he said in an interview.

== Efforts to release ==
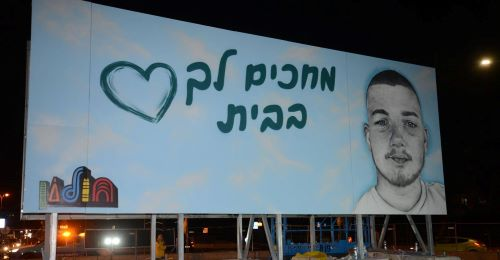
Billboard in support of Bar in Holon (2025)

During his captivity, older family members of Kupershtein told his younger siblings, Dvir, Or, Hila, and Yonatan, and other children in the family, that "we expect Bar to come back at any moment and we have to try to live normally." The family also leaned heavily on traditional Jewish religious practice during this time, and started a lot of religious activities, including reciting Psalms, studying Torah and praying. This included a prayer service held at the Western Wall on January 10, 2025, led by the chief rabbis of Israel.

Kupershtein's mother later recounted an alleged phone call with an unidentified man she believed to be a Hamas militant who reportedly scolded her for not being more public in protesting and criticizing the Israeli government, while threatening Kupershtein's life. She said she told the man that her belief in God made her unafraid of his threats, to which he replied, "Well done, madam!". After the call she posted to social media requesting Kupershtein's tefillin remain in use during his captivity, and passed along the tefillin to an Israeli man who set up tefillin stands for Israelis to borrow tefillin to pray. The project became known as Tefillin for Every Hostage, where volunteers would put on tefillin daily as a sign of solidarity for "their" hostage with stations set up across Israel. Israeli President Isaac Herzog held a gathering for mass tefillin prayers in June 2025.

His family held a public birthday party for Bar at Hostages Square to mark his second birthday in captivity, while close friends posted tributes on social media. In August 2025, his brother Dvir attended nationwide protests to end the Gaza war, stating that he felt, "Today, at least people are doing something."

== Release ==
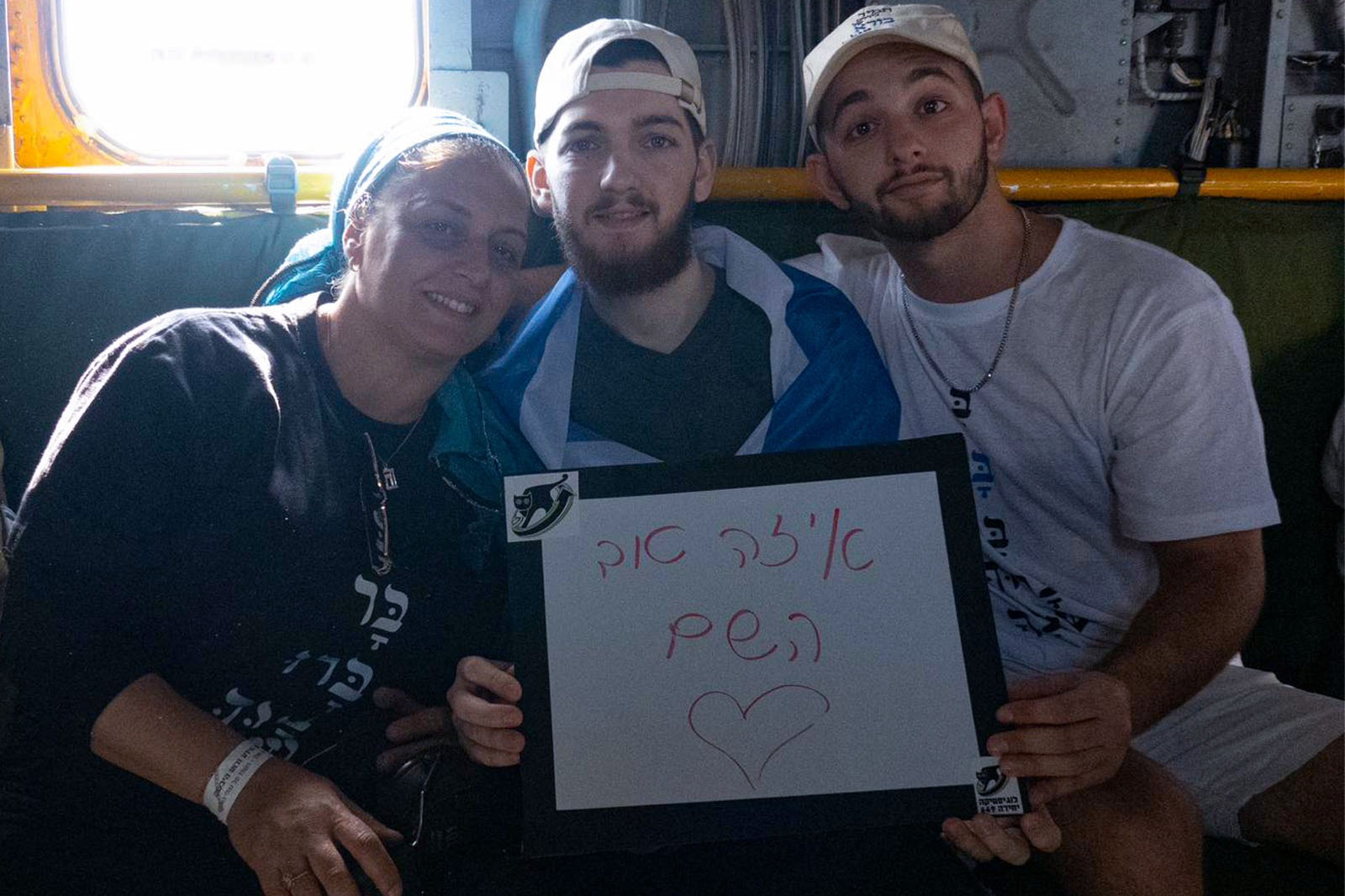
Kupershtein with his family after being released on October 13, 2025

Kupershtein was released from Hamas captivity along with 19 other surviving hostages on October 13, 2025 after 738 days in captivity. Kupershtein and two other released hostages, Nimrod Cohen and Yosef-Haim Ohana were flown by Israeli Air Force helicopters from the Re'im military base to an Israeli hospital after the handover.

=== Post-release activities ===
On October 15, 2025, Israeli Defense Minister Israel Katz met with Kupershtein to hear about his captivity and thank him for his actions assisting victims at the Nova festival massacre.

On October 30, 2025, Kupershtein led a mass tefillin event as a thank you for those who advocated for his release. "I want all of you to put on tefillin together with me—my dream while in captivity was to put on tefillin, and we'll do it for the release of all our brothers who are still there," he told an audience that gathered at Hostages Square in front of the Tel Aviv Museum of Art.

In 2026, Kupershtein published the Hebrew-language book, Unbroken, recounting his harrowing ordeal as a hostage.

== See also ==
- List of Gaza war hostages
