= Benjamin Smith =

Ben or Benjamin Smith may refer to:

== Arts and entertainment ==
- Ben Smith (artist), Australian artist, finalist in the 2024 Archibald Prize
- Ben Smith (musician) (1905–?), American alto saxophonist and clarinetist
- Ben Fox Smith (born 1978), singer of band Serafin
- Benjamin Smith (actor) (born 1989), television actor
- Benjamin Smith (engraver) (1754–1833), British engraver
- Bennie Smith (1933–2006), guitarist
- Ben Bailey Smith (born 1977), known as Doc Brown, English entertainer
- Benjamin Smith (1994–2020), known online as Apollo Legend, American YouTuber

== Media ==
- Ben Smith (journalist) (Benjamin Eli Smith, born 1976), journalist, co-founder and editor-in-chief of news website Semafor in 2022
- Benjamin Eli Smith (1857–1913), editor of the Century Dictionary
- Benjamin T. Smith, English author and historian of Mexico

== Politics ==
- Benjamin Smith (Whig politician) (1783–1860), British politician, MP for Sudbury, 1835–1837, and then Norwich, 1838–1847
- Ben Smith (Labour politician) (1879–1964), British politician and government minister
- Benjamin Smith (North Carolina politician) (1756–1826)
- Benjamin A. Smith II (1916–1991), U.S. Senator from Massachusetts, 1960–1962
- Benjamin H. Smith (1797–1887), American politician in Virginia and West Virginia
- Benjamin Smith (Nova Scotia politician) (1786–1873)
- Benjamin Franklin Smith (1865–1944), Canadian produce dealer and political figure in New Brunswick

== Sports ==
- Ben Smith (cornerback) (born 1967), former NFL player
- Ben Smith (curler) (born 1999), New Zealand curler
- Ben Smith (English cricketer) (born 1972), English cricketer
- Ben Smith (New Zealand cricketer) (born 1991), New Zealand cricketer
- Ben Smith (end) (1911–1941), American football player
- Ben Smith (footballer, born 1978), English footballer
- Ben Smith (footballer, born 1986), English football goalkeeper
- Ben Smith (ice hockey, born 1988), American NHL ice hockey player
- Ben Smith (ice hockey coach) (born 1946), Harvard University alumni, US Olympic team coach
- Ben Smith (rugby league) (born 1984), Australian rugby league player
- Ben Smith (rugby union) (born 1986), New Zealand rugby union player
- Ben Smith (squash player) (born 2002), English squash player
- Benjamin Leigh Smith (1828–1913), British yachtsman and explorer
- Ben Smith (golfer) (1921–2009), American golfer
- Ben Smith (CrossFit) (born 1990), American CrossFit competitor

== Others ==
- Benjamin F. Smith (1831–1868), Union general in the Siege of Corinth
- Benjamin B. Smith (1784–1884), Episcopal presiding bishop
- Benjamin Nathaniel Smith (1978–1999), perpetrator of the 1999 Independence Day weekend shootings
- Benjamin Smith (priest) (1819–1900), Archdeacon of Maidstone
- Benjamin Smith (political scientist) (born 1970), American academic
- Benjamin Smith (Canadian businessman) (born 1971), airline executive
- Benjamin Smith (slave trader) (1717–1770), American planter and politician

== See also ==
- Ben Roberts-Smith (born 1978), Australian soldier and recipient of the Victoria Cross for Australia
- Benjamin Roxburgh-Smith (1884–1951), British fighter ace
