= Axt =

Axt or AXT may refer to:

- Axt (surname)
- Axtya, or Axt, an evil character in Zoroastrian mythology
- AXT, IATA code for Akita Airport, Japan
- AXT, alien crosstalk, intercable interference

== See also ==
- Akhts
- Harry Akst (1894–1963), American songwriter
- Albert Akst (1899–1958), and American musician turned film editor
- AHT (disambiguation)
