= Nimrod Cohen =

Israeli hostage taken by Hamas in 2023

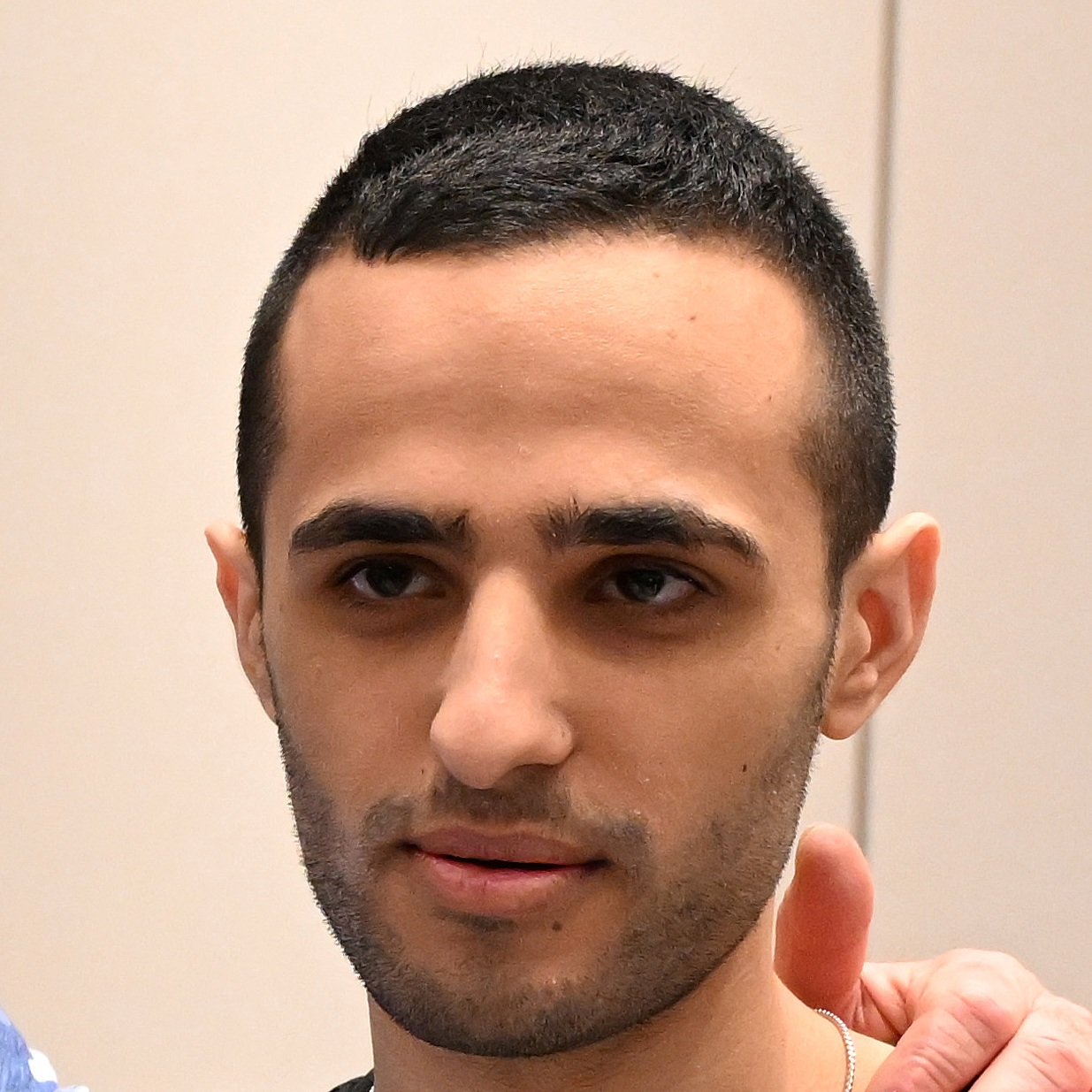
- Cohen after his release in October 2025
- Organization: Israeli Defence Forces
- Known for: Gaza war hostage crisis

Nimrod Cohen (Hebrew: נמרוד כהן; born 15 July 2004) is an Israeli former hostage who was abducted by Hamas on 7 October 2023 while serving in the Israeli Defence Forces (IDF). He was held captive in the Gaza Strip for more than two years under harsh conditions and was released on 13 October 2025 as part of a negotiated agreement.

== Early life ==
Cohen is the son of Vicky and Yehuda. He has a twin sister, Romi, and an older brother, Yotam. The family lives in Rehovot. He attended Ramon Elementary School and later pursued a science track at ORT Rehovot. Alongside his studies, he volunteered as a youth instructor in wilderness and navigation programs, before enlisting in the IDF Armored Corps.

== Abduction ==
Cohen served as part of a 77th Battalion tank crew, under the command of Captain Omer Neutra; Cohen was the gunner of Neutra's tank, and besides him, the crew included driver Shaked Dahan and loader/radio operator Oz Daniel. On 7 October 2023, during Hamas's coordinated assault on Israeli communities near the Gaza Strip, Cohen's tank was positioned near an outpost known as "the White House," between Kibbutz Nir Oz and Kibbutz Nirim, and headed towards the border fence, but was ambushed by Hamas militants and disabled. An IDF investigation later determined that the tank's active defense system malfunctioned before the vehicle was struck by either anti-tank missiles or an explosive device, setting it on fire forcing the crew to abandon it.

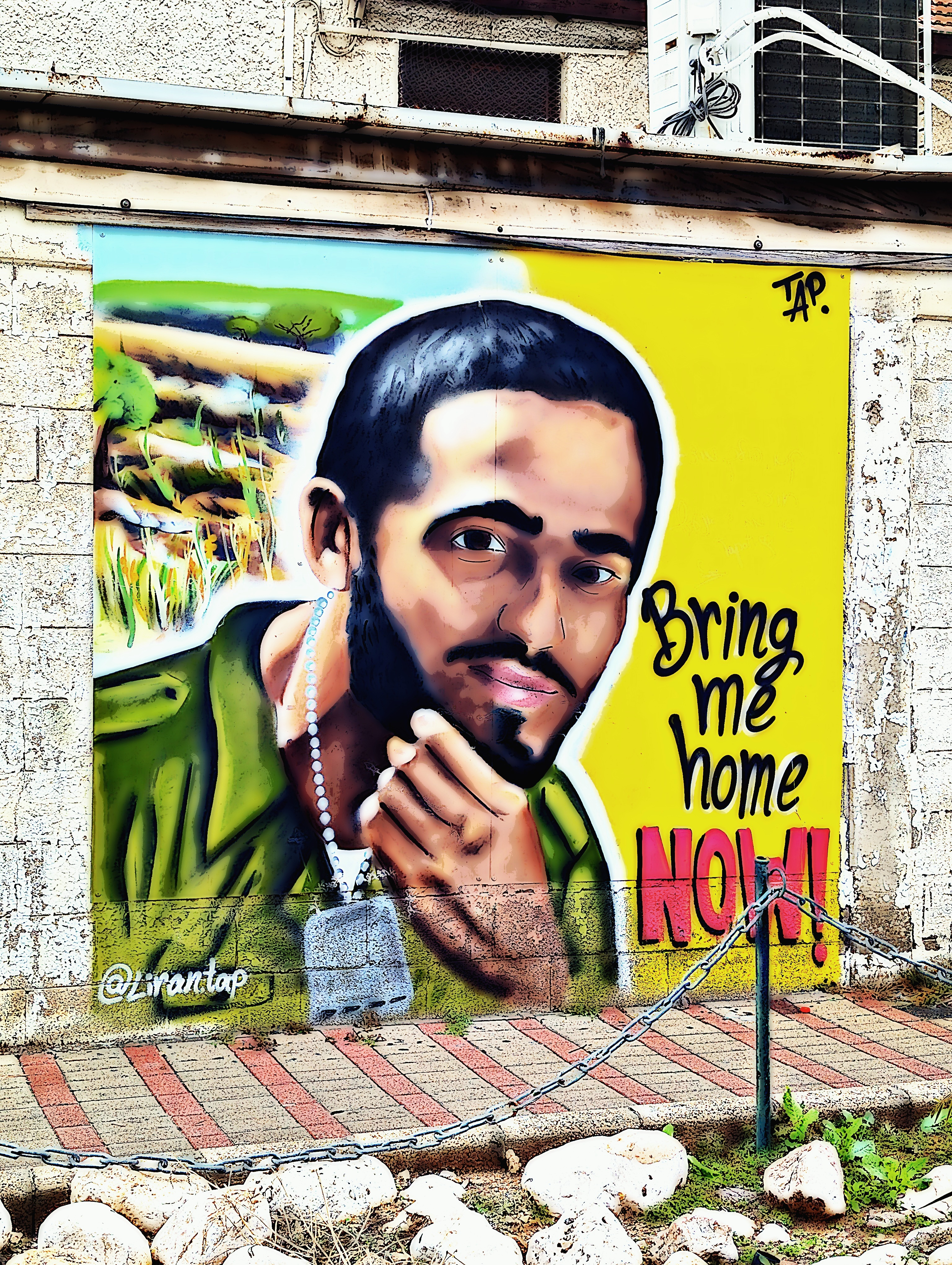
Mural in Rehovot depicting Nimrod Cohen, painted while he was still held in Gaza, commemorating his captivity.

Footage released that morning showed Hamas militants dragging the soldiers from the burning tank and abducting them. The IDF later confirmed that Cohen's three crewmates were killed on the same day, leaving Cohen as the sole survivor of his crew.

== Captivity ==
Cohen was held in Gaza for over two years and was not included in the first two hostage-exchange agreements. During captivity, a small number of signs of life were received, including a brief message relayed by a released hostage: "I'm okay, love you." In March 2025, he was identified in a Hamas video by a tattoo visible on his arm.

Released hostages later reported that Cohen endured harsh physical and psychological conditions. Because of his status as an IDF soldier, he was subjected to interrogations and torture, at times held in a small cage, and shown footage of his friends being killed. Testimony also indicated that he developed an untreated ear infection due to tunnel conditions and a severe skin rash that received no medical care.

=== Advocacy for his release ===
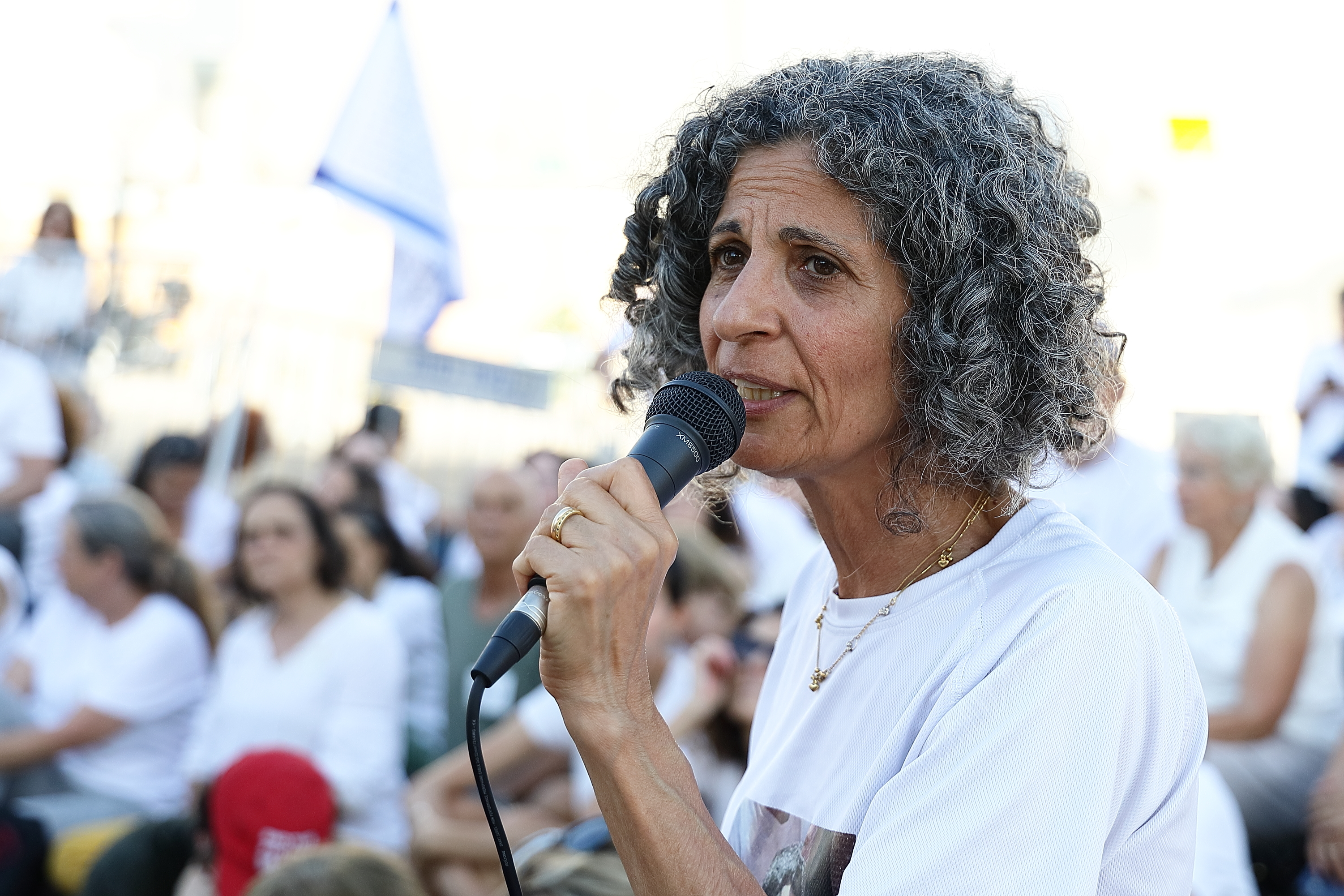
Vicky Cohen, mother of Nimrod Cohen, in the "Mothers and Women Protest" on day 635 of the war, calling for an end to the fighting and the return of all hostages, outside the Shaul Gate at the Tel Aviv Citadel.

Cohen's captivity drew sustained public attention and activism. Cohen's parents and brother joined other families of captives to form the group We Are All Hostages. They participated in the hostage deal protests. They urged international leaders to pressure both Hamas and the Israeli government to reach a ceasefire and hostage release agreement. The Cohen family held meetings with United Nations Secretary-General António Guterres and other senior UN officials in New York and Geneva. They also lobbied various Member States, including France and the United States, as part of an organized campaign to secure the release of their relatives. Cohen's father Yehuda became among the most outspoken critics of Benjamin Netanyahu's handling of the hostage crisis, and repeatedly called for an end to the Gaza war. Yehuda wrote an op-ed in The Atlanta Jewish Times in December 2024 criticizing American Jewish organizations for their lack of advocacy for a hostage deal.

Nimrod Cohen's 20th and 21st birthdays were marked with public events in Rehovot and at Hostages Square in Tel Aviv, featuring performances by Israeli artists and calls for his release. Advocacy efforts continued until the announcement of his freedom in 2025.

== Release ==
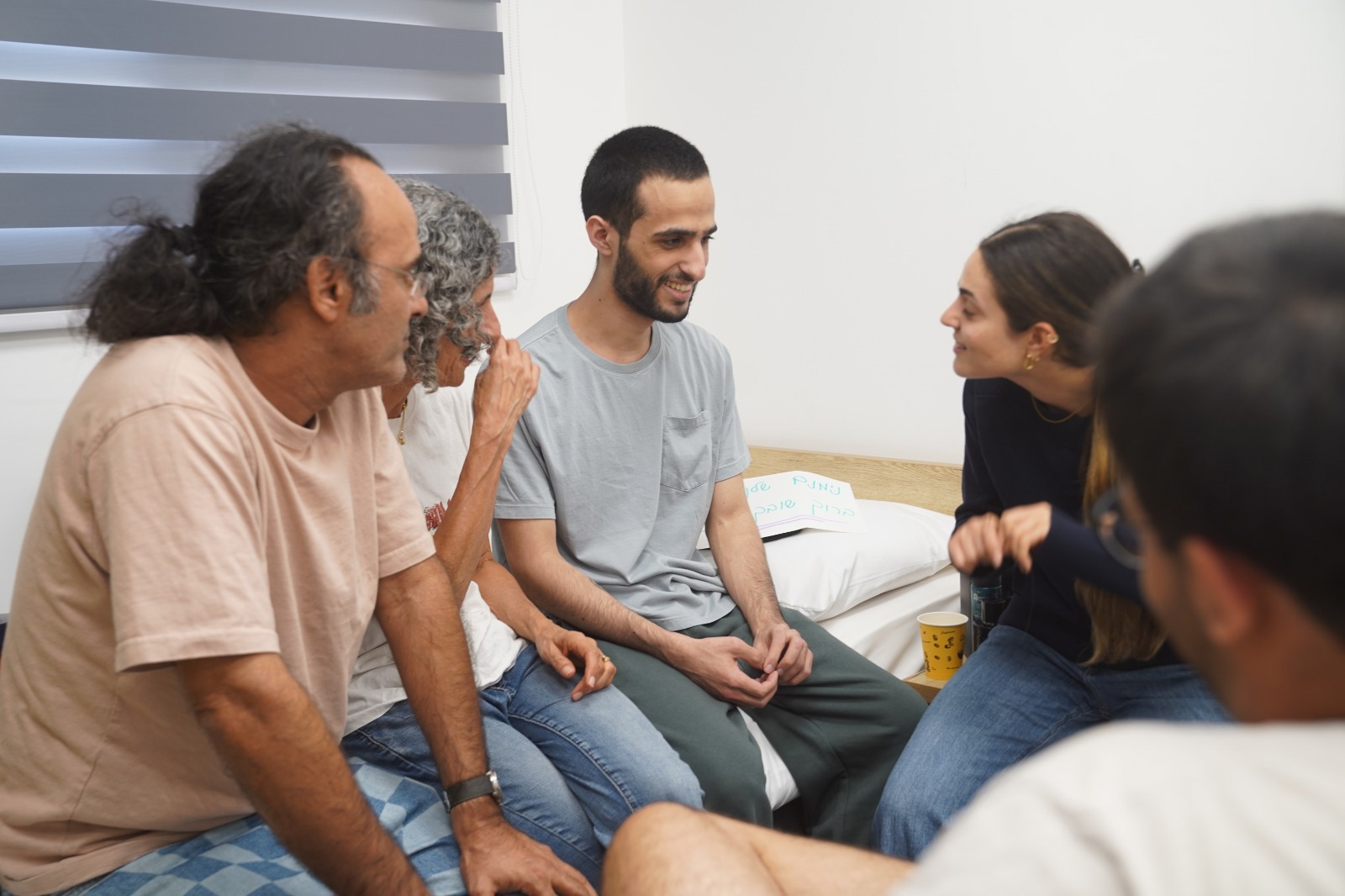
Cohen reunited with his family on October 13, 2025

After 738 days in captivity, on 13 October 2025, Cohen was released alongside 19 other hostages as part of the third Israel–Hamas hostage-release agreement.

== See also ==
- List of Gaza war hostages
- Edan Alexander
- Omer Neutra
