= Ben Underwood =

Ben Underwood may refer to:

- Ben Underwood (footballer) (1901–1958), English footballer
- Ben Underwood (1992–2009), American echolocator
