= Benjamin Cohen =

Benjamin Cohen may refer to:

- Sir Benjamin Cohen, 1st Baronet (1844–1909), British politician and Jewish communal leader, MP for Islington East, 1892–1906
- Benjamin V. Cohen (1894–1983), American political figure, member of President Franklin D. Roosevelt's brain trust
- Benjamin Cohen (political economist) (born 1937), American professor of international political economy
- Benjamin Cohen (born 1972), French musician known as Benjamin Diamond
- Benjamin Cohen (journalist) (born 1982), British journalist and Channel 4 news correspondent

== See also ==
- Ben Cohen (disambiguation)
