= Einav Zangauker =

Israeli activist (born 1978)

- עינב צנגאוקר
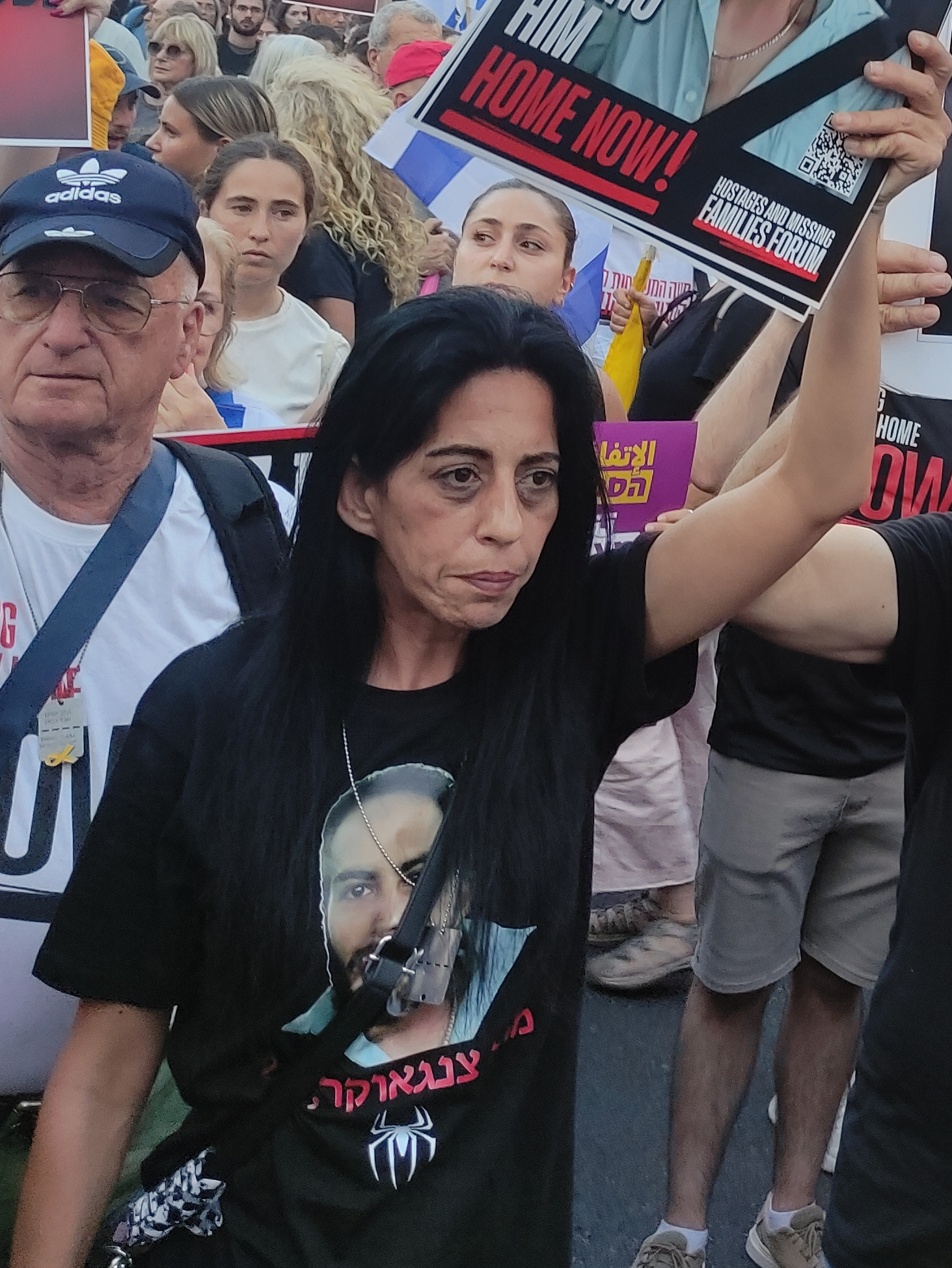
- Einav Zangauker at a protest, September 2024
- Born: 3 December 1978 (age 47)
- Known for: Activism on behalf of the hostages held by Hamas

Einav Zangauker (Hebrew: עינב צנגאוקר; born 3 December 1978) is an Israeli activist, working as part of the Hostages and Missing Families Forum and the We Are All Hostages movement. Her son, Matan, was kidnapped during the October 7 attacks in 2023 and was held in the Gaza Strip until October 2025, when he was released as part of the Gaza peace plan.

== Personal life ==
Zangauker is a resident of Ofakim and worked as a higher education coordinator in the Ofakim Municipality's Education Directorate. She is a single mother to Matan and his two sisters, after divorcing his father Yaron in the 2000s.

== Abduction of son ==
Her son Matan Zangauker and his partner Ilana Gritzewsky were abducted from their home in kibbutz Nir Oz during the October 7 attacks, after which she began working at the Hostages and Missing Families Forum for their return. Ilana was released from captivity in the hostage release deal in November 2023. Matan was featured in a released Hamas video in December 2024, where he and other hostages stated that they were suffering from skin ailments and shortages of food, water and medicine.

=== Release of son ===
During the Gaza Peace Plan in October 2025, Matan Zangauker was released and reunited with his mother on 13 October. Einav and Matan's reunion was filmed by the Israeli military where she stated he was her "You're my life...My life. My hero. Come, come." while hugging him.

== Efforts for release of hostages ==
In November 2023, Zangauker met with Foreign Minister Israel Katz. Until December 2023, she participated several times in the call for the return of the kidnapped at Hostages Square in Tel Aviv, without taking a political position. In January 2024, she met, along with other families of the kidnapped, with Israeli Prime Minister Benjamin Netanyahu. At the end of the meeting, she said: "I left less pessimistic than I went in, but there were no high hopes. I want to believe that the Prime Minister really means that Israel placed a blueprint in the hands of Qatar and not its own."

In February 2024, she began collaborating with activists, who had protested against the judicial reform in 2023 and came to support the families of the kidnapped hostages, to call for the overthrow of the government and new elections to be held. In this regard, she said: "I have been a right-wing woman all my life. I have always voted for Prime Minister Benjamin Netanyahu, including in the last elections. But the almost only people who identify with me, who offer me real help, are the people of these organizations. [...] Those who came out to demonstrate against the judicial reform are the ones who are now giving me a shoulder, who are containing me."

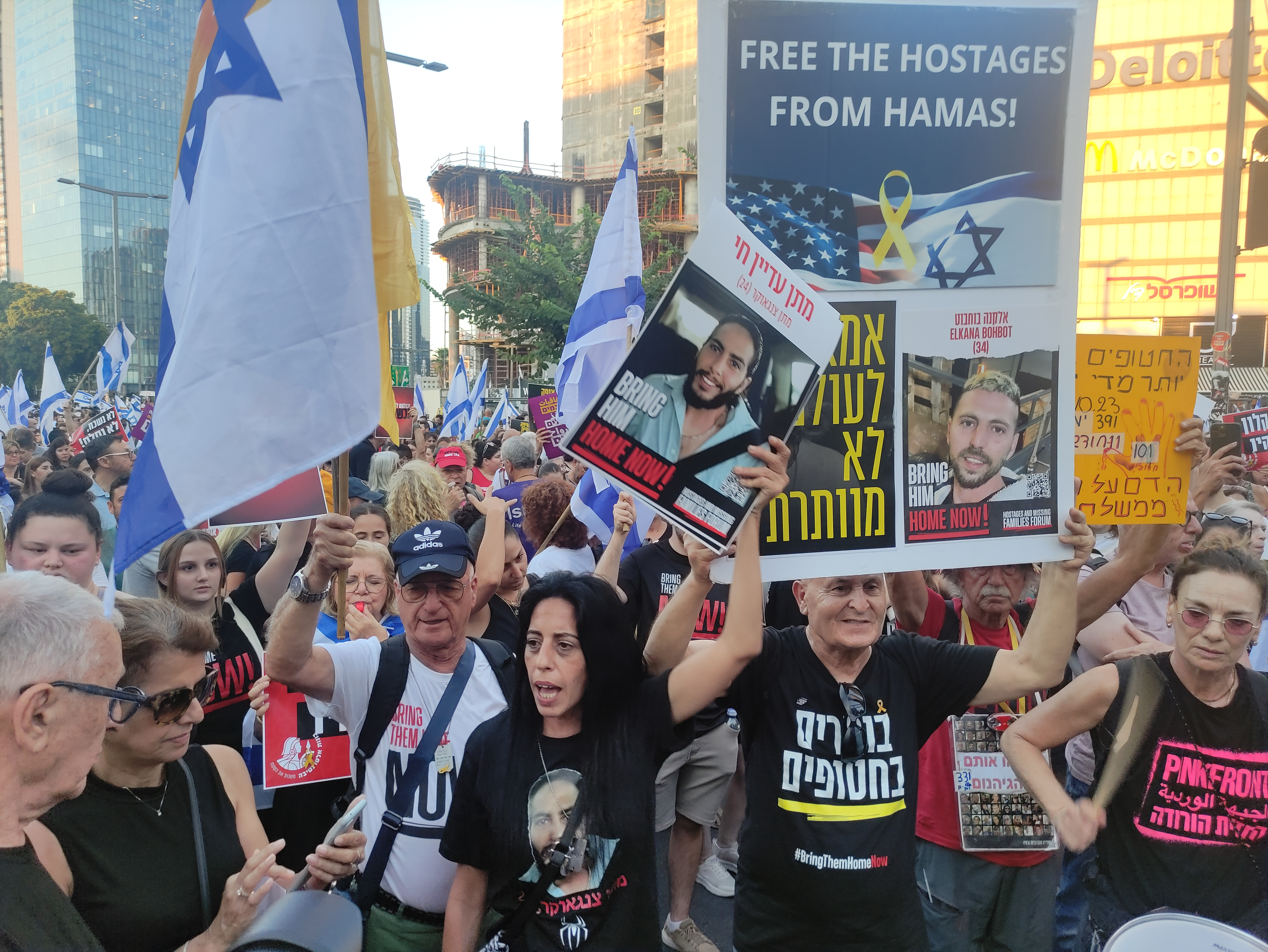
Zangauker calling for a cease fire and release of all hostages in September 2024, after six deceased hostages were recovered by the Israel Defense Forces after they were reported recently shot by their captors

Since then, she has been demonstrating regularly in front of the Begin Gate at HaKirya in Tel Aviv, along with her daughter Natalie and Matan's partner, Ilana Gritzewsky. During a demonstration in front of HaKirya in early February 2024, she was physically attacked by a passersby. A few days later, she and other relatives of Matan Zangauker were injured by a water cannon that the Israel Police used against them. At a demonstration in front of HaKirya in March 2024, she asked to speak with Minister Avi Dichter, who refused. Police officers tried to remove her from Dichter's vehicle, and one of them kicked her. In April 2024, she again called for an end to the war and the return of the abductees, and noted that Netanyahu's "poison machine" was being used against the families of the hostages: "All his mouthpieces speak about us, the families of the hostages, with words that are derogatory, disrespectful, and disrespectful to public figures." In May 2024, her daughter, Natalie Zangauker, was attacked by police during a demonstration in front of HaKirya, and was treated in a hospital. She was summoned for police questioning and banned from "illegal demonstrations" for 15 days.

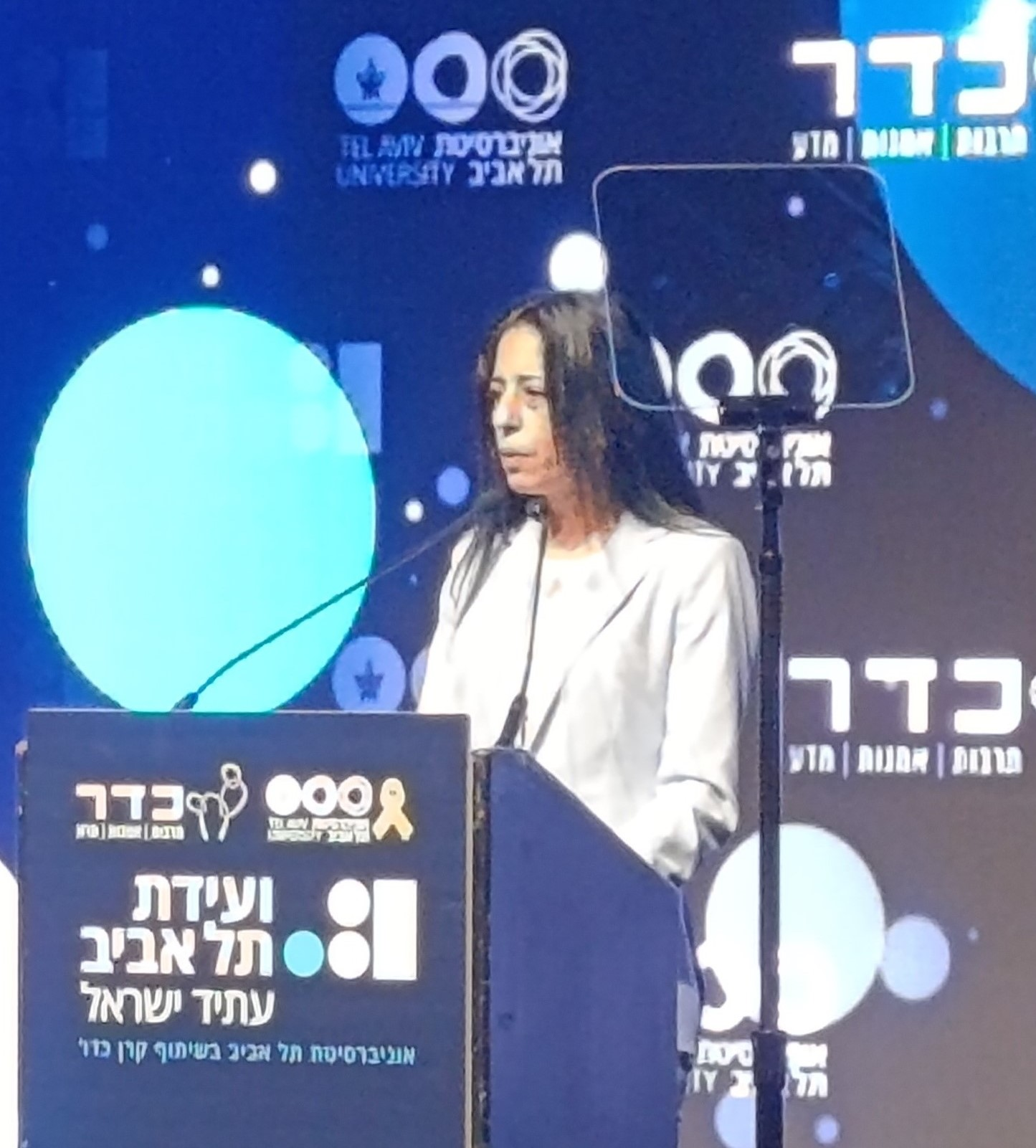
Speaking at Tel Aviv University for the Israel Future Conference in May 2025

On Memorial Day 2024, she spoke with Finance Minister Bezalel Smotrich, who came as a government representative to the Ofakim cemetery, and again called for the government to be dissolved due to the failure to return the hostages.

In February 2025, Zangauker flew to Washington to warn President Donald Trump against, what she claimed were Benjamin Netanyahu's plans to sabotage the hostage deal. In a statement, Zangauker said "I am here to shout and ring every warning bell, and tell Trump – don't let Netanyahu sacrifice my son's life. We must implement the agreement in full."

In August 2025, speaking at a rally for the hostages in front of IDF headquarters in Tel-Aviv, Zangauker personally addressed Prime Minister Benjamin Netanyahu stating that if her son Matan comes back in a body bag, she would make sure that he is charged with murder.

== Recognition ==
- In May 2024, Zangauker lit the "Torch of Hope" at a torch-lighting ceremony and lighting of hope at the Shoni Amphitheater.
- The Jewish National Fund launched the "Path of Heroes" in Ofakim Park, which features the stories of the "heroic women of war," including that of Zangauker.
- She received the 2024 "Truth to Power" award in recognition of her work on behalf of the hostages.
- In November 2024, the writer Aryeh Krishek published the poem "Mother of the Kidnapped," dedicated to Zangauker and the cry of the mothers of the kidnapped.
- In December 2024, she was ranked, along with two other Israeli women, Anat Hoffman and Danielle Cantor, on the BBC's list of 100 Most Influential Women for 2024.
- In October 2025, Tel Aviv University decided to award her an honorary doctorate. In its statement, the university noted that the degree was being awarded to Zangauker for the uncompromising, courageous, and inspiring struggle she waged for about two years, together with the families of the abductees and the general public, for the return to Israel of all the abductees. The university also noted that Zangauker is a symbol of social solidarity, the sanctity of life, unity, and parenthood.
