= Killing of Omer Neutra =

American-Israeli killed during October 7 attacks (2001–2023)

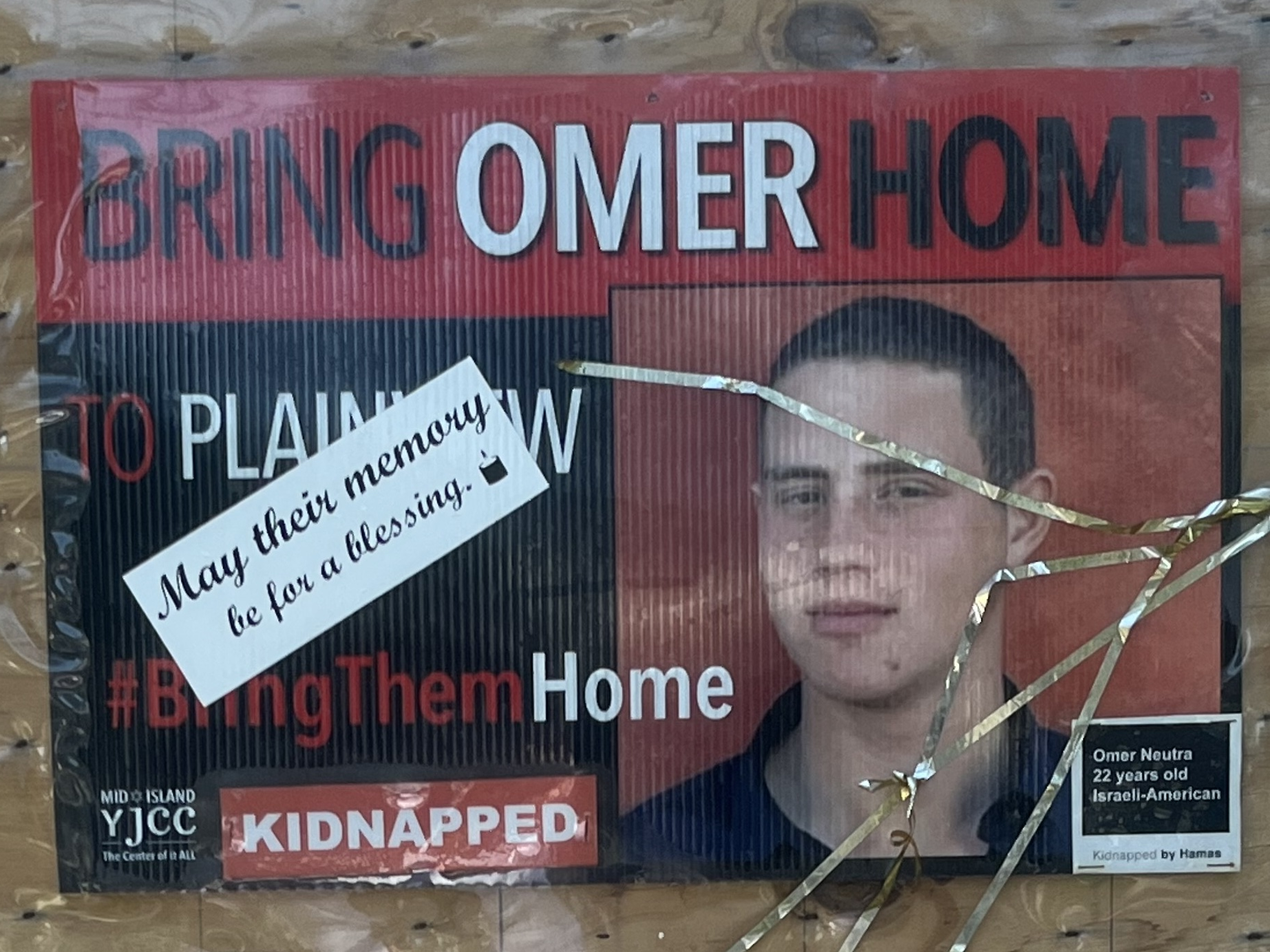
- Hostage poster of Omer Neutra
- Born: October 14, 2001; United States
- Died: October 7, 2023 (aged 21)
- Citizenship: United States; Israel
- Occupation: soldier
- Known for: Gaza war hostage
- Military career
- Allegiance: Israel
- Branch: Armored Corps
- Rank: Captain
- Conflicts: Gaza war; October 7 attacks

Omer Neutra (Hebrew: עומר נאוטרה; 14 October 2001 – 7 October 2023) was an American-Israeli Israel Defense Forces (IDF) officer who was killed by Palestinian militants in the October 7, 2023 attack.

Born and raised in New York to Israeli parents, Neutra enlisted in the IDF in 2020 as a lone soldier, serving as a tank platoon commander. During the October 7, 2023 attack in southern Israel by Hamas, Neutra's was one of few tanks stationed along the Israel-Gaza border. Neutra was killed in the attack and his body was held hostage by Hamas in Gaza.

On 2 December 2024, the IDF confirmed that Neutra had been killed on October 7 and that his body was being held in Gaza by Hamas. His remains were returned to Israel on 2 November 2025.

== Early life and background ==
Omer Maxim Neutra was born on 14 October 2001 in Queens, New York, United States, and grew up in the Nassau County community of Plainview, on Long Island. His family was of Israeli background, and his grandparents were Holocaust survivors.

He deferred his acceptance at SUNY Binghamton to spend a gap year in Israel and enlisted in the Israel Defense Forces (IDF) as a lone soldier. In November 2020, Neutra enlisted in the IDF. He joined the Armored Corps, later completing a tank commander's course and then an officer's course. He was assigned to the 77th Battalion of the 7th Armored Brigade as a tank platoon commander.

== October 7 attack ==
The morning of the 7 October 2023 attack, Captain Neutra was commanding one of only 12 tanks stationed on the border with Gaza. The tank was positioned at the "White House" outpost between Nirim and Nir Oz. After learning of the attack, the tank, reportedly suffering from steering problems, headed towards the border fence but was ambushed by Hamas militants with RPGs and explosive devices and set on fire, forcing the crew to evacuate. Neutra and two of his crew, driver Shaked Dahan and loader/radio operator Oz Daniel, were killed immediately, and the fourth crew member, gunner Nimrod Cohen, was captured alive. All four were then taken to Gaza. Footage of the burning tank with its crew being killed or captured became among the most known images of the 7 October attacks; Neutra was seen in the footage lying on the ground next to the tank, either dead or injured and unconscious.

Initially, the entire crew was presumed to have been captured alive, but Dahan was declared dead in November 2023 and Daniel was in February 2024. After more than fourteen months of uncertainty, on 2 December 2024 the IDF declared that Captain Neutra had also been killed on the day of the assault. Cohen, the sole survivor, was released in October 2025 as part of the Gaza peace plan.

== Campaign for release ==
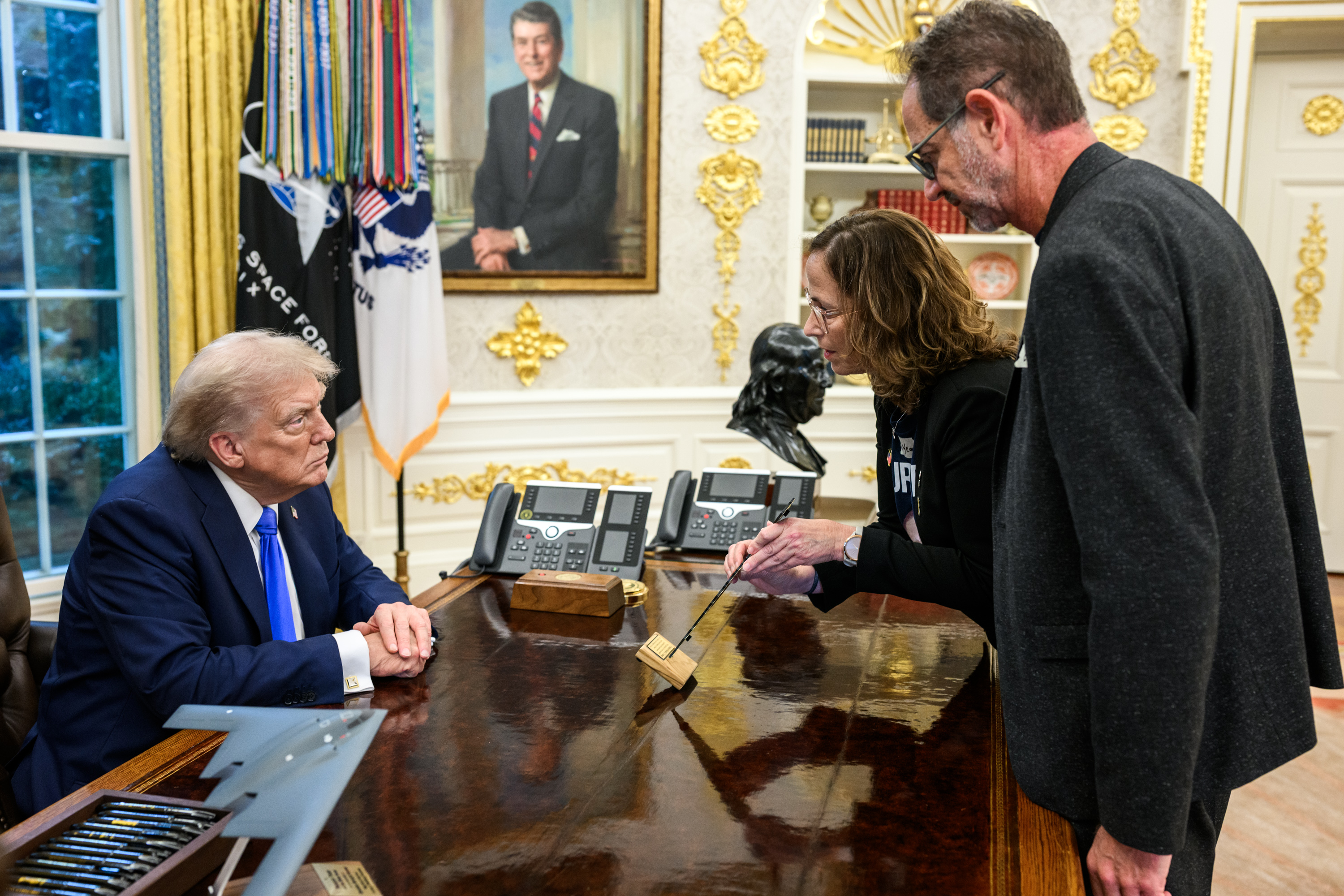
Omer Neutra's parents, Ronen and Orna, meeting with President Donald Trump in October 2025

Soon after his abduction, Neutra's parents Ronen and Orna began a campaign to free him from captivity. They routinely traveled to Washington, D.C. and Israel, connecting with and lobbying political leaders and activists, and working in conjunction with the Hostages and Missing Families Forum.

On the second anniversary of the attack, Donald Trump hosted the families of Omer Neutra and Edan Alexander, another Israeli-American lone soldier taken by Hamas, in the Oval Office.

On 2 November 2025, as part of the framework of the Gaza war peace plan, Hamas returned the bodies of Neutra and Daniel to Israel (Dahan's body had been recovered by the IDF in the Gaza strip in August 2024), along with those of Colonel Asaf Hamami. Their remains had been purportedly recovered from a tunnel in Khan Younis.

On 7 November 2025, Neutra was buried in the Kiryat Shaul military cemetery in Tel Aviv.

== Legacy ==
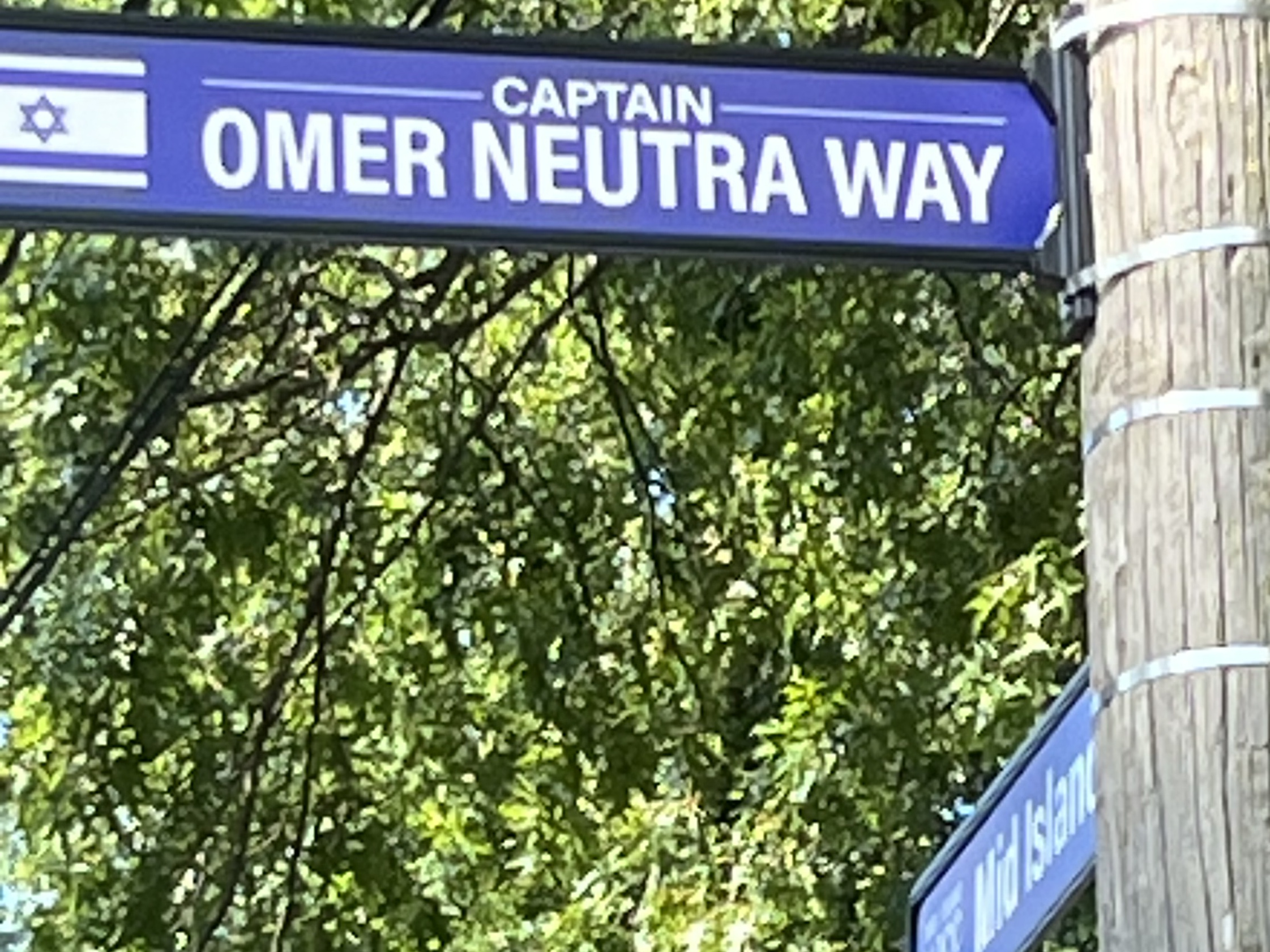
"Captain Omer Neutra Way" in Plainview, New York

After the December 2024 announcement of Neutra's death, New York Governor Kathy Hochul ordered flags on state buildings be flown at half-staff.

In February 2025, Nassau County legislators voted to dedicate part of Manetto Hill Road in Plainview as Captain Omer Neutra Way. The dedicated road includes the Mid-Island Y Jewish Community Center, where activists regularly rallied to demand the release of Israeli hostages.

In September 2025, the Phipps–Marilyn Park was renamed to Captain Omer Neutra Memorial Park in Plainview in the Town of Oyster Bay, in Nassau County, New York, United States. It is located between Phipps Land and Marilyn Boulevard, within a residential neighborhood in Plainview, and has an area of 2.1 acres (0.85 ha). The dedication ceremony occurred on September 21, joined by Neutra's family and friends, Oyster Bay Town Supervisor Joseph Saladino, Nassau County Executive Bruce A. Blakeman, local clergy, and other leaders and dignitaries. The ceremony additionally included speeches, calls for peace and for Hamas to release his body, and prayers – along with musical performances by violinist Nicolas Attila and the choir from the Schechter School of Long Island – Neutra's alma mater.

After the return of his remains in early November 2025, United States Secretary of State Marco Rubio stated that Neutra's life had been "a testament to the resolve of the Jewish people" and that "We will never forget his story, nor the ultimate sacrifice he paid for peace".

Thousands attended Neutra's funeral at the Kiryat Shaul military cemetery, including President of the State of Israel Isaac Herzog, former Minister of Defense Yoav Gallant, former IDF Chief of Staff Herzi Halevi, and U.S. CENTCOM Commander Brad Cooper.

== See also ==
- Gaza war hostage crisis
