= Ben Cohen =

Ben Cohen may refer to:

- Ben Cohen (bridge) (1907–1971), English bridge player and author
- Ben Cohen (businessman) (born 1951), American businessman, co-founder of Ben & Jerry's ice cream company
- Ben Cohen (rugby union) (born 1978), English LGBT activist and ex-rugby union player
- Ben Cohen, guitarist formerly known for his involvement with Powerglove
- Ben Cohen (photographer) (born 1968), Israeli photographer

== See also ==
- Benjamin Cohen (disambiguation)
- Bennett Cohen (1890–1964), American screenwriter
