= Ben Jackson =

Ben or Benjamin Jackson may refer to:

- Benjamin Jackson (sailor) (1835–1915), Canadian sailor, farmer, and veteran of the American Civil War
- Benjamin Daydon Jackson (1846–1927), botanist and taxonomer
- Ben Jackson (musician) (born 1963), American guitarist from Crimson Glory
- Ben Jackson (footballer, born 1985), English footballer
- Ben Jackson (footballer, born 2001), English footballer
- Ben Jackson (golfer) (born 1967), English golfer based in Australia
- Ben Jackson (Doctor Who), a fictional character in Doctor Who
