= Ben Cohen (photographer) =

Israeli photographer

- בן כהן
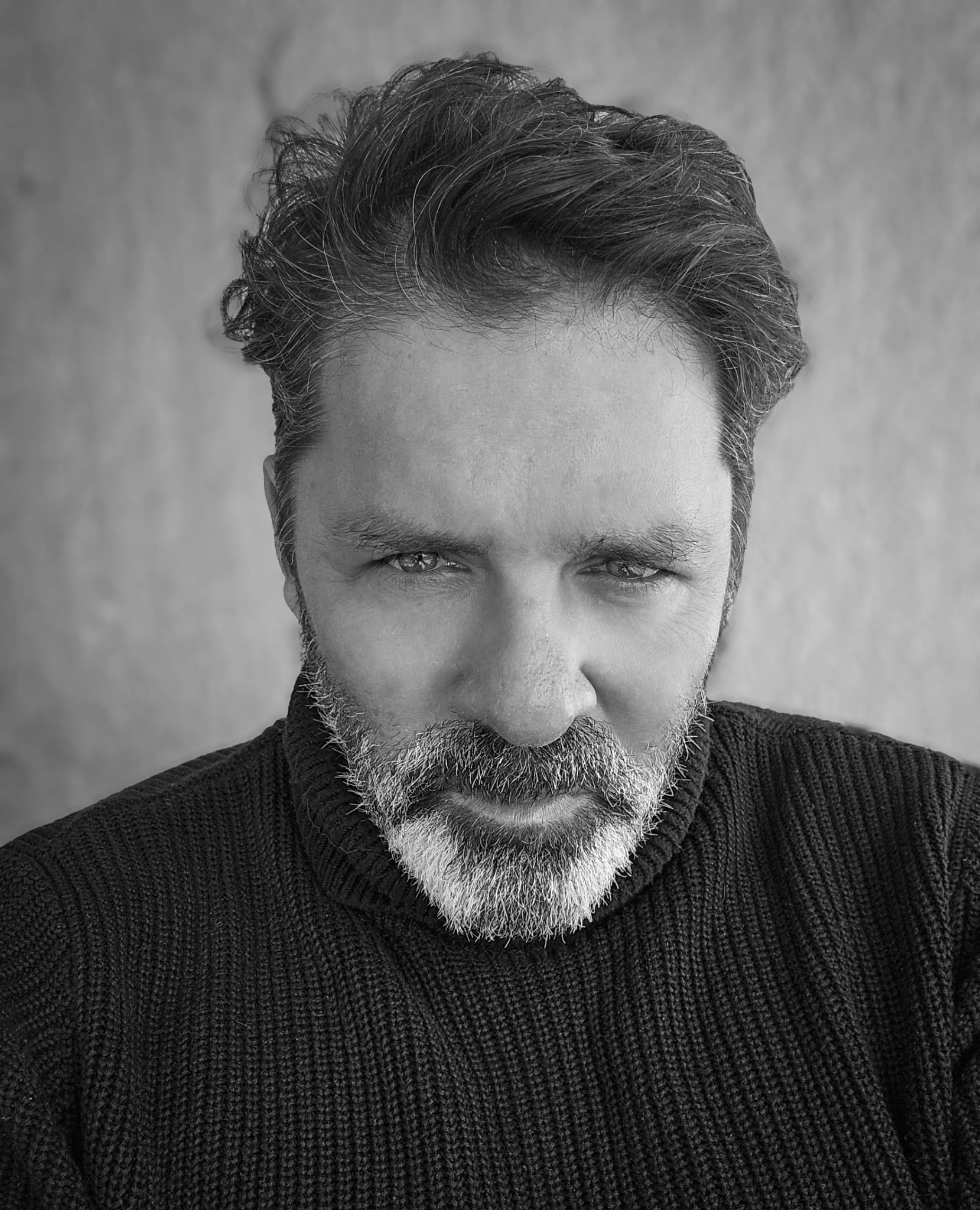
- Born: January 9, 1968 (age 58); Pardes Hanna-Karkur, Israel
- Known for: Photography

Ben Cohen (Hebrew: בן כהן; born January 9, 1968) is an Israeli photographer.

== Career ==
In 1996, Cohen began working as a photographer for the local network of Yedioth Ahronoth. During that time, he established a photography studio and specialized in classic studio photography. In parallel with his photography career, he worked in the high-tech and low-tech industries. He then turned to a career as a freelance photojournalist, and his work was widely published in newspapers and magazines in Israel and internationally, including cover photos and magazine articles. Cohen has documented the protests against the judicial reform from their inception.

In July 2021, he participated in the photography exhibition "A Free People in Our Homeland," (Am Hofshi Be'Artzenu - Taken from Israel's national Anthem, "HaTikva") which brought to the general public comprehensive documentation of the Balfour Protests through the lens of a camera. The exhibition, which curated photographs by professionals alongside amateur photographers, provided diverse perspectives on the protest events and gave visual expression to the spirit of the times and the public struggle.

In 2022, he participated in the exhibition "Molecular Art" presented at the Space Gallery in Jaffa. A year later, he participated in the exhibition "Democracy Says", presented at the Museum on the Seam.

In 2024, he participated in the exhibition "Not Another Day, Not Another Minute", which was presented in the central library at the Kibbutz College, dedicated to the families of the hostages and the struggle for their return, and in the "Local Testimony" exhibition, the largest press photo exhibition in the country and displayed at the Eretz Israel Museum. The exhibition featured photographs of Einav Zangauker, the mother of the Matan Zangauker, who was taken hostage during the October 7 attacks, and one of the leaders of the struggle to free the hostages, and Reuma Kedem, the mother of Tamar Kedem Siman Tov, who was murdered on October 7th with her family. That same year, he participated in the exhibition "Through Their Eyes - The Story of the Kfar Aza Community", an exhibition presented in the cultural hall at Kibbutz Shefayim, which documented the story of the Kfar Aza community. The exhibition opened after the events of October 7, 2023, with the aim of presenting the story of the community that was affected. The exhibition allowed visitors to learn about the daily life, heritage, and reality of the residents of Kfar Aza before and after the events. The presentation of the exhibition at Kibbutz Shefayim was part of the documentation and remembrance of the communities surrounding Gaza.

== "First Testimony" Project ==
"First Testimony" is a historical documentary project that Cohen began following the events of October 7, 2023. The project focuses on collecting photographic testimonies from survivors from the Gaza Strip parameter, survivors of the Nova Festival in Re'im, and families of IDF soldiers who fell on the first day of the war. The initiative began a few days after the attack, when Cohen visited his family members who were evacuated from Kibbutz Be'eri to a hospitality complex in the Dead Sea area. As part of the project, over two hundred and fifty personal testimonies of survivors were recorded, constituting an important historical document that documents the events from the perspective of the residents.

The project has several main goals: Historical documentation: preserving historical memory for future generations through comprehensive documentation of the testimonies. Legal proceedings: collecting testimonies for presentation at the International Criminal Court in The Hague, in order to support legal proceedings against the perpetrators of the massacre and the leaders of the Hamas organization. Public awareness: Some of the testimonies are being edited and presented around the world for public awareness purposes. Cohen signed an agreement with the National Library, according to which the testimonies will be preserved in the library's archives and will be presented to the public. The Channel 12 Morning Show panel chose him as "Hero of the Year" following the testimonies and photography project.
