= Edan Alexander =

American-Israeli former Gaza war hostage (born 2003)

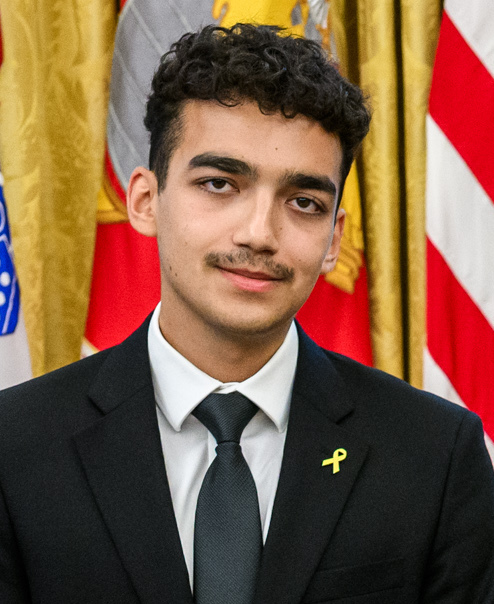
- Alexander in 2025
- Born: December 29, 2003 (age 22); Tel Aviv, Israel
- Citizenship: United States; Israel
- Occupation: Soldier
- Known for: Gaza war hostage
- Military career
- Allegiance: Israel
- Branch: Israeli Ground Forces
- Service years: 2022–present
- Unit: Golani Brigade
- Conflicts: Gaza war (POW); October 7 attacks; Kissufim massacre

Edan Alexander (born December 29, 2003) is an American-Israeli soldier and former Hamas prisoner of war who had been held in brutal conditions in underground tunnels and became the last known living American citizen held hostage by Hamas in the Gaza war hostage crisis. His captivity and eventual release after 584 days received extensive international media coverage and political attention. His abduction during the October 7 attacks, his dual U.S.-Israeli citizenship, and his role as an Israeli soldier made his case particularly significant. Alexander's release was the result of high-profile negotiations involving the U.S. government and was marked by meetings with President Donald Trump at the White House. The negotiations and advocacy to secure his freedom became emblematic of international efforts to resolve the hostage crisis. Upon his return, Alexander received an official welcome in his hometown of Tenafly, New Jersey, with hundreds gathering to celebrate his return.

== Background ==
Alexander was born in Tel Aviv, Israel, on December 29, 2003, to Israeli parents. The family moved to the U.S. when he was a baby. Alexander spent summers visiting Israeli relatives including his grandparents. After graduating from Tenafly High School in 2022, Alexander returned to Israel. He joined Garin Tzabar, a program of the Israel Scouts, and enlisted in the Israel Defense Forces. Alexander serves in the Golani Brigade of the Infantry Corps.

== Capture and captivity ==
During the October 7 attacks on Israel, Hamas militants seized Alexander from his military base. He had volunteered to stay there over the Jewish Sabbath. By his account, he faced off with almost 30 militants by himself before he was kidnapped. Alexander was one of six Americans taken into captivity by Hamas.

Alexander was held in underground tunnels, Hamas safe houses, mosques, schools, and tents of displaced Palestinians. He was once transferred by a militant that was disguised as a woman, going through a busy Gaza market. He reported suffering hunger in captivity, losing a quarter of his body weight after being served only pitta, hummus, rice and canned food, which his father said was reflective of the food scarcity in Gaza. He described captivity as a "year of hell." He was kept with Matan Zangauker for some time, as well as with Itzik Elgarat, whose body was returned in February 2025 after his death due to a heart attack as he was subjected to torture during interrogations. According to Thai hostages' accounts, Alexander advocated for them with their Hamas captors in English, explaining that the Thais were migrant workers, not Israelis.

In November 2024, Hamas released a video of Alexander in which he pleaded for help and said he did not want to "end up dead like my fellow USA citizen, Hersh".

Alexander said he had been held in a cage in a Hamas underground tunnel with his hands and feet bound. Alexander was handcuffed, beaten and interrogated during his time in captivity, according to his father, who added, “His whole body has bedbug bites. His skin is in terrible condition.”

In April 2025, Abu Obeida, spokesman for Hamas’ military wing, the Qassam Brigades, said Hamas had lost contact with the group holding Alexander.

== Efforts to release ==
His parents worked actively to advocate for his release, meeting with Congressman Josh Gottheimer in the weeks after he was taken as a captive in Gaza.

== Release ==
In May 2025, Alexander returned to Israel from Gaza in a deal made directly between Hamas and the United States. He was seen with masked Hamas fighters as they handed him over to International Red Cross workers in Khan Younis. Unlike prior hostage release ceremonies, he was not paraded in front of a crowd.

Alexander was given a Star of David necklace by Steve Witkoff, U.S. special envoy to the Middle East, who had played an active role in the negotiations. The necklace had belonged to Witkoff's late son, Andrew. Other negotiators credited by President Trump included Secretary of State Marco Rubio and US Special Envoy for Hostage Response Adam Boehler. Alexander's family had met with the President multiple times while they were advocating for his release.

== Post-release activities ==
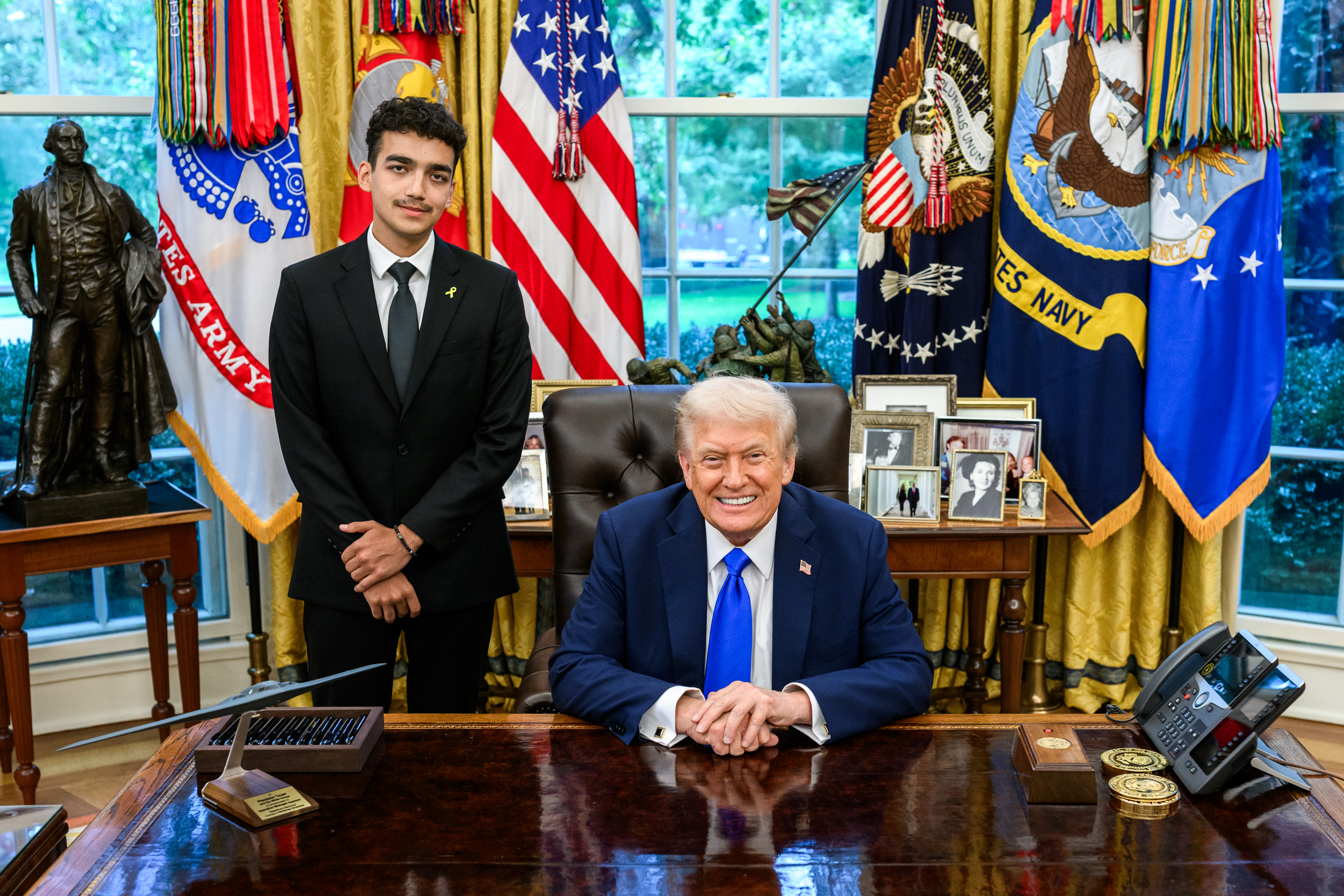
Alexander with President Donald Trump in the Oval Office, 2025

Josh Gottheimer, the congressman who represents him in the U.S. House of Representatives, marked Alexander's release after "enduring 584 days of relentless torture and suffering".

Alexander returned in June 2025 to large crowds in his hometown of Tenafly, New Jersey. Gottheimer described his return as "a huge day worthy of great celebration across our state." Alexander was greeted by President Trump at the White House on July 3, 2025. His family urged the Israeli government to continue efforts to free the 58 remaining hostages in Gaza. Alexander also visited the grave of Menachem Mendel Schneerson, also known as the Lubavitcher Rebbe, in New York. While in captivity, Alexander had seen television footage of his parents praying there for his return together with President Trump.

At a September 2025 gala hosted by Friends of the Israel Defense Forces (FIDF) in New York, Alexander announced he would return to Israel to serve in the Israel Defense Forces (IDF).

== See also ==
- Omer Neutra, another Israeli-American soldier taken captive on 7 October
- List of Gaza war hostages
