= Benson (given name) =

Notable people with the given name Benson:

- Benson Abounu (born 1949), Deputy Governor of Benue State, Nigeria
- Benson Barus (born 1980), Kenyan long-distance runner in marathon and half marathon competitions
- Benson Boone (born 2002), American singer-songwriter
- Benson Dillon Billinghurst (B.D. Billinghurst), American educator in Nevada during the early 20th century
- Benson K. Buffham (1919–2019), American intelligence official, deputy director of the National Security Agency
- Benson Deng, South Sudanese writer and one of the Lost Boys of Sudan
- Benson Farb (born 1967), American mathematician
- Benson Fong (1916–1987), American character actor
- Benson Gicharu (born 1985), Kenyan amateur boxer
- Benson Henderson (born 1983), American mixed martial artist
- Benson E. Hill (1795–1845), English writer, soldier and epicure
- Benson W. Hough (1875–1935), United States federal judge
- Benson Hunt, Samoan footballer
- Benson Idahosa (1938–1998), Charismatic Pentecostal preacher, founder of the Church of God Mission International
- Benson Idonije (born 1936), Nigerian broadcaster and music critic
- Benson Mbai Itwiku, Kenyan politician
- Benson Koech (born 1974), Kenyan middle distance runner
- Benson Leavitt (1797–1869), American businessman, alderman and acting mayor of Boston, Massachusetts
- Benson Lee (born 1969), Korean-American filmmaker
- Benson Everett Legg (born 1947), former United States District Judge, Maryland
- Benson John Lossing (1813–1891), American historian and writer
- Benson Masya (1970–2003), Kenyan long-distance runner
- Benson Mates (1919–2009), American philosopher
- Benson Mayowa (born 1991), American football defensive end
- Benson Mhlongo (born 1980), South African football defender and midfielder
- Benson Mulomba (born 1949), Zambian middle-distance runner
- Benson Mwita (born 1987), Tanzanian cricketer
- Benson Seurei (born 1984), Kenyan-born Bahraini middle-distance runner
- Benson Shilongo (born 1992), Namibian international footballer
- Benson Stanley (born 1984), Australian rugby union player
- Benson Taylor, FRSA (born 1983), English composer, record producer, electronic musician and humanitarian
- Benson Wairegi (born 1953), accountant, banker, businessman and entrepreneur in Kenya
- Benson Whitney (born 1956), United States Ambassador to Norway from 2006 to 2009
- Benson Wood (1839–1915), U.S. Representative from Illinois

== Fictional Characters ==
- Benson Dunwoody, a main character on the American animated television series Regular Show
