= Ben Jackson (footballer, born 1985) =

English footballer

Personal information
- Full name: Benjamin Robert Jackson
- Date of birth: 22 October 1985 (age 41)
- Place of birth: Durham, England
- Position: Striker

Senior career*
Years	Team	Apps	(Gls)
2004–2005	Doncaster Rovers	1	(0)
2005	→ York City (loan)	10	(0)
2005–2006	Bishop Auckland		
2006	Inverness Caledonian Thistle		
2006	Horden Colliery Welfare		
2006–2007	AFC Hornchurch		
2007–2008	Morecambe		
- * Club domestic league appearances and goals

Benjamin Robert Jackson (born 22 October 1985) is an English footballer.

== Football career ==
Jackson started his career with Doncaster Rovers in 2004. He joined York City on a month's loan in March 2005. This loan was extended until the end of the season in April 2005. Doncaster released him at the end of the 2004–05 season. Following a brief period with Bishop Auckland, Jackson was signed by Inverness Caledonian Thistle in February 2006, playing till the end of the season. He then returned to the Northern League, to sign for Horden Colliery Welfare.
