= Ben Wiegers =

Dutch curler

Ben Wiegers was the coach of the Dutch national women's curling team from 2002 to 2006. When he started coaching the team, they were ranked 17th in Europe. When he quit, the team was ranked 7th in Europe and had qualified for the Women World Curling Championships.
