= Ben Richards =

Ben Richards or Benjamin Richards may refer to:

- Ben Richards (actor) (born 1972), British stage and television actor
- Ben Richards (writer) (born 1964), British author and screenwriter
- Benjamin Wood Richards (1797–1851), 59th mayor of Philadelphia
- Ben Richards, the main character in The Running Man, a Stephen King novel
- Ben Richards, the main character in The Immortal

== See also ==
- Franklin Benjamin Richards, fictional character in the Fantastic Four
- François-Marie-Benjamin Richard (1819–1908), archbishop of Paris
- Richard Benjamin (born 1938), American actor and director
