= Axt (surname) =

Axt is a German occupational surname metonymically derived from the word Axt, 'axe' (axe maker, woodcutter, carpenter). Notable people with the surname include:

- Daniel Axt (born 1991), German actor
- Helga Axt (born 1937), German chess master
- William Axt (1888–1959), American composer of film music
