= Ben T H So =

Hong Kong jockey

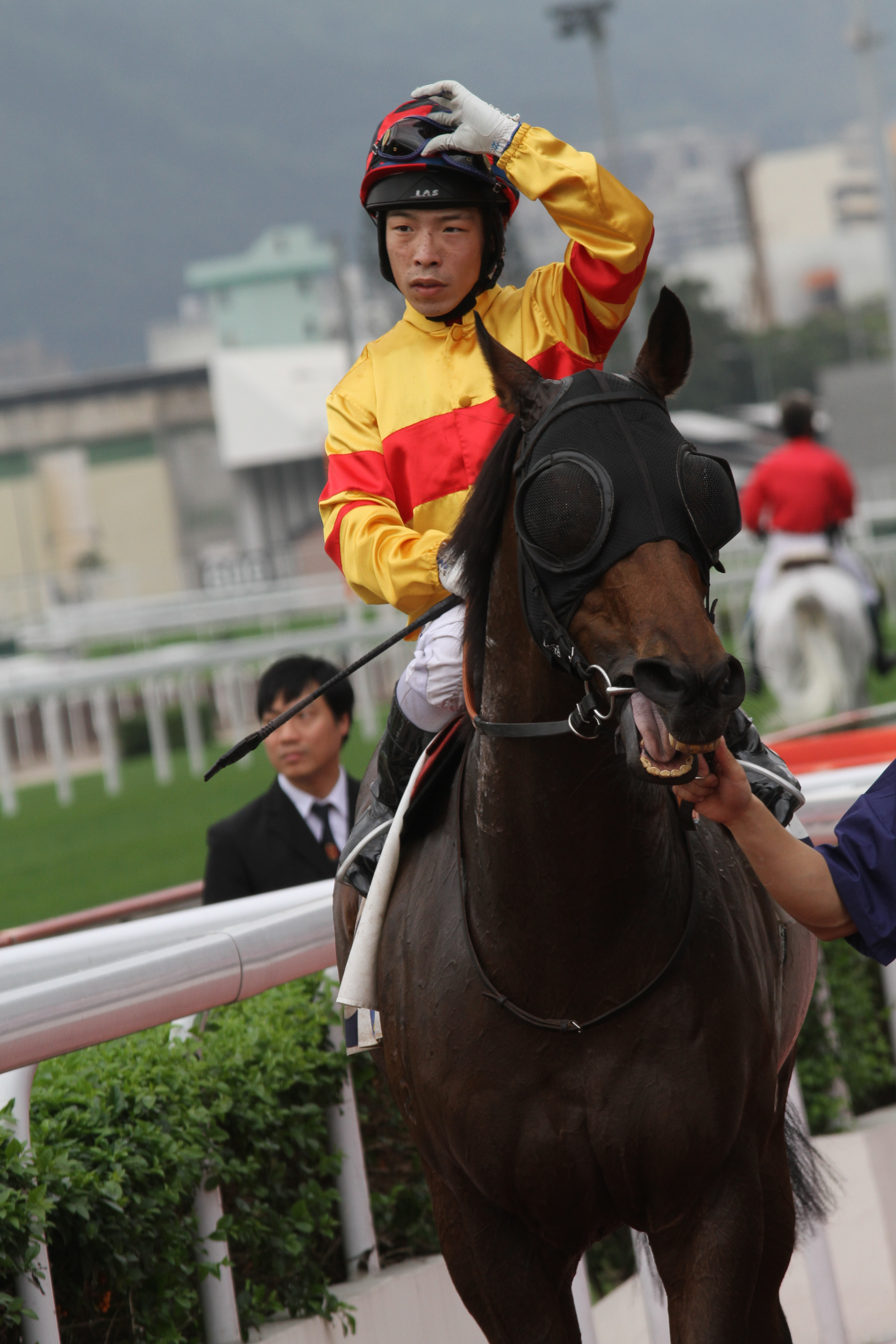
Hong Kong Jockey Ben So Tik Hung in Sha Tin Racecourse in 2010

Ben T H So (born 25 May 1990) is an apprentice horse racing jockey. He has had 19 victories in 2010/11, which brings his career total to 48. A tally of 12 wins in 2013/14 took his overall Hong Kong win total to 107.

== Major wins ==
- HKG3 Premier Plate - Mr Medici (2009/10)

== Performance ==
Seasons	Total Rides	No. of Wins	No. of 2nds	No. of 3rds	No. of 4ths	Stakes won
2010/2011	333	19	21	19	29	HK$14,621,650

== See also ==
- The Hong Kong Jockey Club
