= Ben Underwood (footballer) =

English footballer (1901–1958)

Personal information
- Full name: Benjamin Riley Underwood
- Date of birth: 30 September 1901
- Place of birth: Alfreton, England
- Date of death: 9 March 1958 (aged 56)
- Place of death: Bridgnorth, England
- Height: 5 ft 10 in (1.78 m)
- Position: Left half

Senior career*
Years	Team	Apps	(Gls)
- Newton Rangers
1920−1924	New Hucknall Colliery		
1924	Sutton Town		
1924−1926	Derby County	0	(0)
1926−1929	Doncaster Rovers	101	(1)
1929−1931	Leeds United	6	(0)
1931−1933	Coventry City	20	(0)
- * Club domestic league appearances and goals

Benjamin Riley Underwood (30 September 1901 − 9 March 1958) was an English footballer who played as a left half.

He was born in Alfreton, Derbyshire and began playing with Newton Rangers before joining New Hucknall Colliery. After a brief spell with Sutton Town, Underwood signed for Derby County, but made no first-team appearances, and went on to play League football for Doncaster Rovers, where he made 105 appearances in competitions. He moved to Leeds United, only managing to break into the first team for a few matches, before going on to Coventry City for two seasons.

He married near Derby in 1928 and died in the Bridgnorth area in 1958.
