= Ben Harvey =

Ben or Benjamin Harvey may refer to:

- Benjamin Harvey, English shopkeeper and founder of the predecessor of Harvey Nichols
- Ben Harvey (rugby union) (born 1974), English rugby union player and coach
- Ben Harvey (American radio personality), Sirius XM presenter and podcaster
- Ben Harvey (Australian radio personality), Triple J presenter
