= Benjamin T. Smith =

English historian

- Occupations: Historian, author, expert witness

Academic background
- Education: Cambridge University
- Doctoral advisor: David Brading

Academic work
- Institutions: Michigan State University; University of Warwick

Benjamin T. Smith is a British historian of Mexico, and professor of Latin American history at the University of Warwick.

He has written for both academic and popular audiences on indigenous politics, social movements, conservatism, Catholicism, the press, journalists, organized crime and drug trafficking in Mexico. His writing has appeared in the Nexos, Letras Libres, BBC, The Guardian and Time. His 2021 book The Dope: The Real History of the Mexican Drug Trade was reviewed in The Hispanic American Historical Review, the Journal of Contemporary History, The New York Times, the Financial Times, and its Spanish translation in Estudios Sociológicos and Letras Libres.

He is working on a biography of legendary Ciudad Juárez drug queen pin, Ignacia Jasso aka La Nacha and has a substack called, The Impuniverse.

Smith is frequently quoted in news articles on the issues of Mexican drug traffickers and national security. He has also served as an expert witness in many asylum proceedings..
