= Acht =

Acht may refer to:

== Legal history ==
- German-language term for outlawry
  - Imperial ban in the Holy Roman Empire

== People ==
- René Acht (1920 – 1998), Swiss painter and graphic artist

== Places ==
- Acht, Rhineland-Palatinate, Germany
- Acht, village within the municipality of Eindhoven, Netherlands
- Hohe Acht, a mountain peak in the Eifel range, Germany
- African-Canadian Heritage Tour, a designated trail in Ontario, Canada

== Other uses ==
- Acht, German and Dutch for "eight"; see 8 (number)
- Acht (TV channel), a Flemish television channel
- "Acht-acht", informal name for the German 8.8 cm Flak 18/36/37/41 gun
