= Ben Hunt (disambiguation) =

Ben Hunt (born 1990) is an Australian rugby league footballer.

Ben Hunt may also refer to:

- Ben Hunt (baseball) (1888–1927), American baseball pitcher
- W. Ben Hunt (1888–1970), American artist, outdoor educator and author
- Ben Hunt (American football) (1900–1981), American football player
- Ben Hunt (basketball) (born 1978), Australian basketball player
- Ben Hunt (footballer) (born 1990), English footballer

== See also ==
- Ben Hunt-Davis (born 1972), British rower
