= Aryeh Krishek =

Israeli novelist and biographer

- אריה קרישק
- Born: 29 September 1952 (age 73); Holon, Israel
- Occupations: Novelist, biographer

Aryeh Krishek (Hebrew: אריה קרישק; born 29 September 1952) is an Israeli novelist and biographer also active in film and journalism. He is the author of Burial in Jerusalem, In a Straight Line and No Casualties to our Forces.

== Biography ==
Aryeh Krishek was born in Holon. He lives in Katzrin in the Golan Heights. He was sentenced to five months of public service due to his role in the Nimrodi affair in 1994–2004 involving the rivalry between two Israeli newspapers Yedioth Ahronoth and Maariv.

== Literary career ==
Krishek was the co-founder and director, with composer Alexander Kagan, of the Israeli Chamber Opera. In 1975, he wrote the script for the political film The Honey Connection.

Krishek translated Nathanael West's classic novel The Day of the Locust and Irwin Shaw's Nightwork into Hebrew.

In 2009, he published The Neverending Horse. His biography The Wonderful World of Gabby Eshkarwas published in 2010. In early 2012, he published Take a Burning Match, a novel on the possibility of a civil revolt in Israel. In 2014, his play "Falling live" was performed by Alex Ansky. In 2017 he published "Follow the Wind." In spring 2018 Krishek bought a house in Katzrin and moved to live in the Golan Heights. At 2020 he married his companion (woman) Zipi Lavi, a member of kibbutz Bet-Zera.

== Published works ==
- No Casualties to Our Forces (2002)
- HaOr Shel Ogirah: Sipurim (1993) ISBN 965-418-039-1 (in Hebrew)
- Peacemaker (1980)
- The Loyal (1976)
- Take a burning match (2012)
- Falling live (2016)
- Temporary enemy (2018)
- falling friend (2022)

== See also ==
- Israeli literature
