= Ben Simm =

Ben Simm or Sim, or variants, may refer to:

== Politicians ==
- Benjamin Sims Jr. Imperial British politician who participated in the 1833 Bahamian general election
- Benjamin Sims, British politician who participated in the 2022 Reading Borough Council election
- Ben Sims, British politician who participated in the 2018 Tower Hamlets London Borough Council election
- Benjamin Simms, British politician who participated in the 2022 Hammersmith and Fulham London Borough Council election

== Sports ==
- Ben Sims (born 2000), American player of American football
- Ben Sim (born 1985), Australian cross-country skier
- Benjamin Simm (born 1986), German rugby union player

== Entertainment ==
- Benny Sims (1924–1994), American country-bluegrass musician
- Bennie Sims, member of Pieces of a Dream
- Ben Simms, an award winning director recognized at the 75th Directors Guild of America Awards

== Others ==
- Benjamin Simms (1830–1854), American farmer and second husband of Zerelda James, the mother of the outlaws, the James brothers
- Bennett Sims (1920–2006), American Episcopalian bishop
- Bennett Sims (author), American writer
