= Elizabeth Axtman =

American artist

- Born: June 4, 1980 (age 45); Andrews Air Force Base, Maryland
- Education: San Francisco State University, School of the Art Institute of Chicago
- Website: http://elizabethaxtman.com/

Elizabeth Axtman is an American artist who uses video, photography, performance, and painting to explore "the complexities of race and humor."

== Early life ==
Axtman was born on Andrews Air Force Base in Maryland in 1980. Her mother is Afro-Panamanian and her father is German. She received her BA in photography from San Francisco State University in 2004 and her MFA in photography from the School of the Art Institute of Chicago in 2006. She also participated in Skowhegan School of Painting and Drawing in 2006 Summer Residency Program. She lives and works in Oakland, California.

== Work ==
Axtman is interested in exploring and molding historical and contemporary representations of American racialization, including the sub-themes of racial passing and the trope of the tragic mulatto. Several of her pieces involve reworking found video and audio, and she often inserts herself—her voice, her face—into her work. In noting that her work draws comedic inspiration from the likes of Richard Pryor and Paul Mooney, she has stated that: "Humor has always been a part of what I do. It helps me to talk about things, but it keeps me safe too."

In her 2005 video American Classics, Axtman stares into the camera at close range and mouths the words to various racially charged film dialogues and monologues, including snippets from the 1934 movie Imitation of Life. Axtman's constant artistic forays into the rhetoric of race suited her work for Black Is, Black Ain't, a group show currently on view at the Museum of Contemporary Art Detroit. Black Is, Black Ain't, which culls its title from Ralph Ellison's Invisible Man, and which features Axtman's American Classics, seeks to examine the contemporary moment, where the cultural production of so-called “blackness” is concurrent with efforts to make race socially and politically irrelevant.

The 2006 video Where’s The Party At? depicts Axtman, in a white track suit, dancing around a burning cross as the video's eponymous dance track (a song by R&B group Jagged Edge) plays in its entirety. The video was shot on the grounds of the Skowhegan School of Painting and Sculpture in Maine, where Axtman was an artist in residence in 2006. In an interview about Where's The Party At?, Axtman admitted: "I really got into the historical meaning of burning a cross... When [the Ku Klux Klan] burn it within their little crew of white people in little dresses, there’s such [a] meaning of spirituality and brotherhood and their white pride. Then they put it in black people’s yards to [say] 'I hate you nigger, get away.' So it has this really weird double meaning. It was really important for me to feel like I was mocking their sacredness. That was the best part for me...making a joke out of their hatred."

Elizabeth Axtman is a recipient of the Skowhegan Endowment for Scholarship Foundation for her 2006 residency there, a Franklin Furnace Fund grant, and was an artist-in-residence with Harvestworks in NYC 2012.

Axtman also produces paintings, drawings and mixed media works. She has cited Otabenga Jones, Kehinde Wiley, Guillermo Gomez-Pena, and Adrian Piper as artistic inspirations.

== Exhibitions ==
Video work by Axtman was on view at The Studio Museum in Harlem from February 13 through March 15, 2009. Axtman's work has been exhibited at the Contemporary Arts Museum Houston, the Museum of Contemporary Art Cleveland, the Hyde Park Art Center, the Renaissance Society, the Spelman College Museum of Fine Art, and many other museums and galleries.
