= Ben Laughlin (ten-pin bowler) =

American ten pin bowler

Ben Laughlin is a professional ten-pin bowler. He is the current Professional Bowlers Association Western Regional champ. When Laughlin was stationed with the US Air Force in Germany, he won the 1994 European Masters Championship. Since then, he has bowled thirty-six 300 games and won seven western region titles. He was the 2000 Rookie of the Year and 2001 Bowler of the Year. Ben and his family reside in Maricopa, Arizona.
