= Benjamin Curtis =

Benjamin or Ben Curtis may refer to:

- Benjamin Curtis (musician) (1978–2013), American musician
- Benjamin Robbins Curtis (1809–1874), American jurist
- Ben Curtis (golfer) (born 1977), American golfer
- Ben Curtis (actor) (born 1980), American actor

== See also ==
- Benjamin Curtis Porter (1843–1908), American artist
