= Ben Coleman =

Ben Coleman may refer to:

- Ben Coleman (basketball) (1961–2019)
- Ben Coleman (American football) (born 1971)
- Ben Coleman (squash player) (born 1991)
- Ben Coleman (politician), British MP for Chelsea and Fulham

== See also ==
- Benjamin Wilson Coleman (1869–1939), Justice of the Supreme Court of Nevada
