= Daniel Axt =

German actor

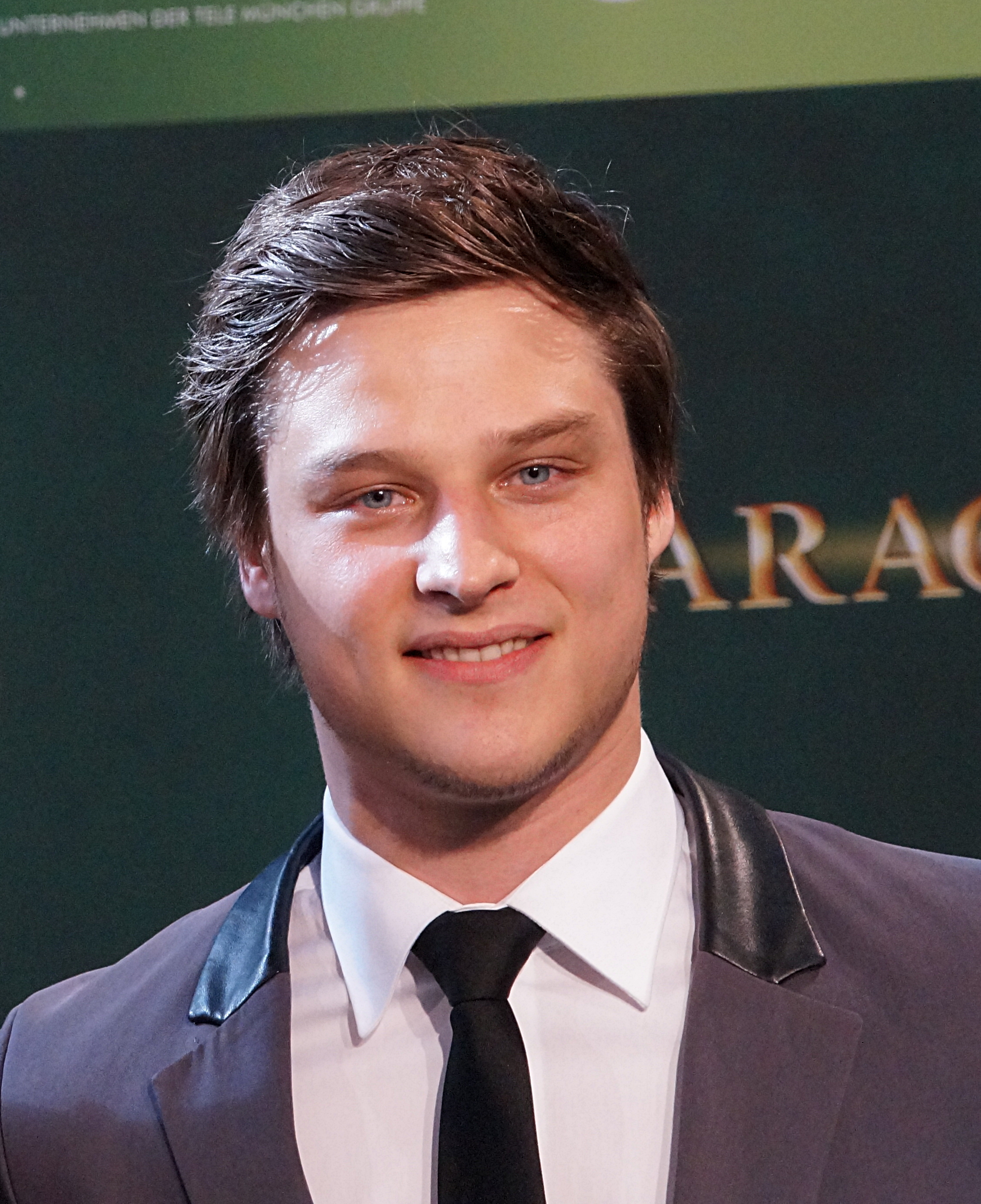
- Daniel Axt at the German premiere of Emerald Green, June 2016
- Born: Daniel Axt; November 19, 1991 (age 34); Langenhagen, Germany
- Occupation: Actor
- Years active: 2006–present

Daniel Axt (born November 19, 1991) is a German actor. He is known for portraying Nick in Disney's film Rock It!.

== Filmography ==
=== Film ===
Year	Title	Role	Notes
2008	The Bridge	Juergen Neuhaus	TV film
2010	Rock It!	Nick	
2010	How to Train Your Dragon	Hiccup Horrendous Haddock III	German voice-dub
2011	Gift of the Night Fury	Hiccup Horrendous Haddock III	German voice-dub
2012	Schneeweißchen und Rosenrot	Prinz Jakob	
2014	How to Train Your Dragon 2	Hiccup Horrendous Haddock III	German voice-dub
2014	The Maze Runner	Winston	German voice-dub
2015	Maze Runner: The Scorch Trials	Winston	German voice-dub
2017	Vacation from Life	Darek	

=== Television series ===
Year	Title	Role	Notes
2007–2009	KRIMI.DE	Luke Wagner	3 episodes
2010	Polizeiruf 110	Patrick Funke	1 episode
2011	Countdown – Die Jagd beginnt	Bastian Fritz	1 episode
2014	Cologne P.D.	Bruno Dohmen	1 episode
2014–2017	Leipzig Homicide	Leonard Benkelmann / Piet	2 episodes
2015	Verbotene Liebe	Jannik Anders	9 episodes
2017	Notruf Hafenkante	René Sievers	
2018	Heiter bis tödlich: Morden im Norden	Alexander Blohm	1 episode

=== Games ===
Year	Title	Role	Notes
2024-	Moonvale	Eric	3 episodes and counting
