= Benjamin Smith (political scientist) =

Academic work
- Discipline: Political Science
- Sub-discipline: Comparative politics with a focus on oil politics and civil conflict
- Institutions: University of Florida
- Notable works: Hard Times in the Lands of Plenty: Oil Politics in Iran and Indonesia

Benjamin Smith (born July 24, 1970) is a political scientist and Professor in the Department of Political Science at the University of Florida. His research focuses on the developing world, with a particular focus on resource wealth and politics, ethnic conflict, and regimes and regime change.

== Education ==
Smith received a B.A. in Government and History from Claremont McKenna College in 1992 and an M.A. in Middle East Studies and PhD in Political Science from the University of Washington in 1996 and 2002, respectively.

== Scholarship ==
Smith's first book, Hard Times in the Lands of Plenty: Oil Politics in Iran and Indonesia was published in 2007 by Cornell University Press. His second book, "Rethinking the Resource Curse," was published in 2021 by Cambridge University Press. He has published articles on the politics of resource wealth in the American Journal of Political Science, Studies in Comparative International Development, Conflict Management and Peace Science, in The Oxford Handbook of State Transformations, and in the Routledge Handbook of Oil Politics.

His research on ethnic conflict has been published in World Politics and World Development.

His research on regimes and regime change has appeared in World Politics and in Perspectives on Politics.
