= Ben Carter =

Ben Carter may refer to:

- Benjamin F. Carter (1824–1916), Wisconsin politician
- Ben Carter (actor) (1907/10–1946), American actor and casting agent
- Ben Ammi Ben-Israel (1939–2014), or Ben Carter, American founder and spiritual leader of the African Hebrew Israelites of Jerusalem
- Ben Carter (born 1981), English drummer for metal band Evile
- Ben Carter (Arkansas judge) (c. 1895–1943), associate justice of the Arkansas Supreme Court
- Ben Carter (basketball) (born 1994), American-Israeli basketball player
- Ben Carter (rugby union) (born 2001), Welsh rugby union player
