= Ben Hardy =

Ben Hardy may refer to:

- Ben Hardy (actor) (born 1991), English actor
- Ben Hardy (motorcycle builder) (died 1994), American custom motorcycle designer
- Benjamin Gower Hardy (1898 – 1944), Australian recipient of the George Cross
- Benjamin Hardy, Australian professional volleyballer
