= We Are All Hostages =

Israeli organization advocating for October 7 hostages

- כולנו חטופים
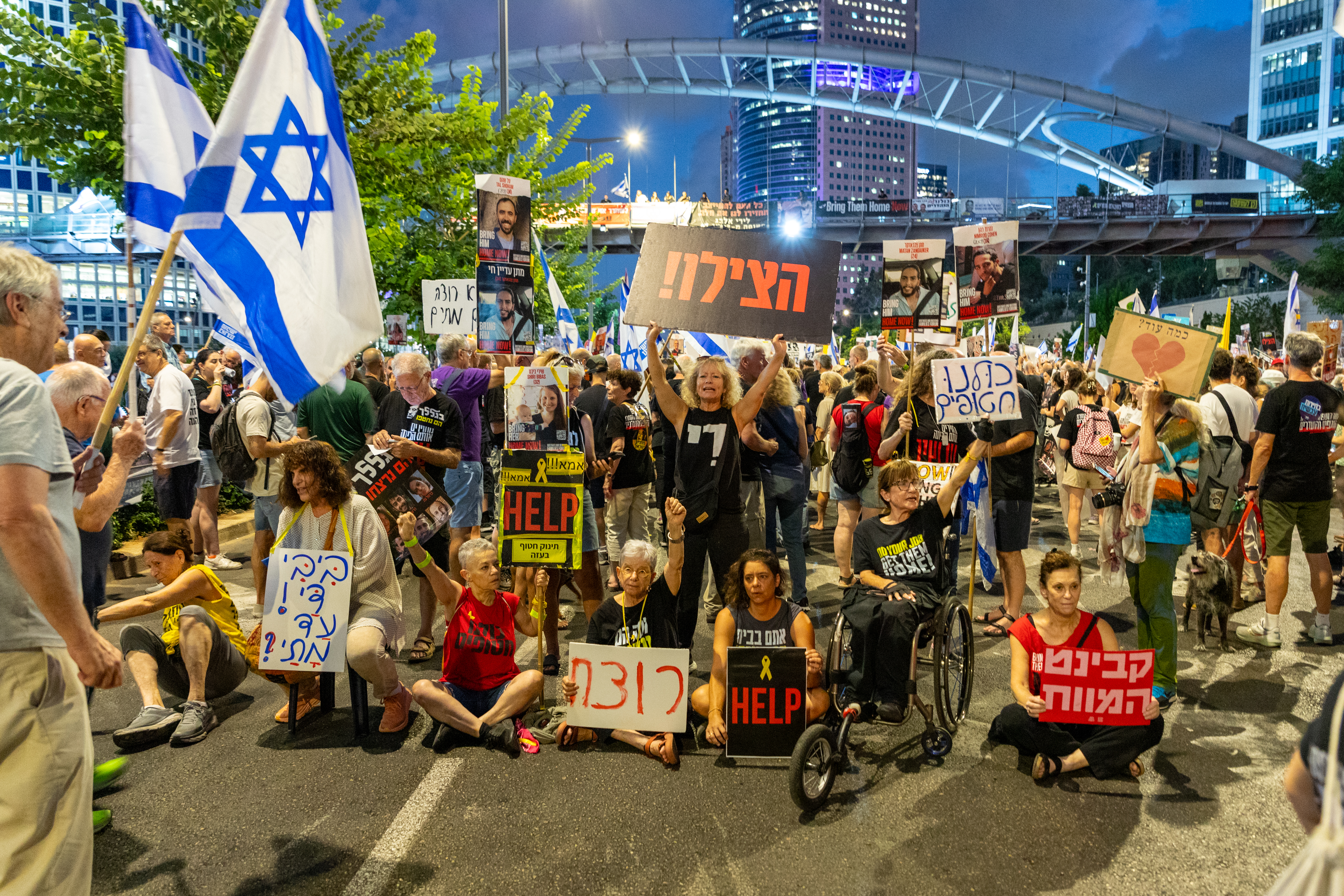
- Daily road block organized by "We Are All Hostages" near HaKirya, 4th September 2024.
- Type: Grassroots
- Location: Israel
- Key people: Einav Zangauker, Yehuda Cohen, and others
- Website: Instagram

We Are All Hostages (Hebrew: כולנו חטופים, romanized: Kulanu Hatufim) is an Israeli grassroots group made up of families of Israeli hostages who were kidnapped during the October 7 attacks, as well as activists who support them. The group is known for its involvement in the Israeli hostage deal protests. Key figures include Einav Zangauker and Yehuda Cohen, parents of hostages held in the Gaza Strip.

The group protests daily outside IDF headquarters (HaKirya) in Tel Aviv, and they are known for blocking Highway 20 (Ayalon) on multiple occasions. They have called for an end to the Gaza war and a deal to return the hostages, arguing that Benjamin Netanyahu, the Israeli prime minister, is sabotaging negotiations for a permanent ceasefire deal.

A member of We Are All Hostages was arrested by United States Capitol Police for disrupting Netanyahu's speech to the United States Congress in July 2024. Cohen wrote an op-ed in The Atlanta Jewish Times in December 2024 criticizing American Jewish organizations for their lack of advocacy for a hostage deal. The group signed an open letter a few months later criticizing Israeli Minister of National Security Itamar Ben-Gvir.

== See also ==
- Hostages and Missing Families Forum
