= Ben Axtman =

American politician

Member of the North Dakota Senate
- In office 1987–1990

Personal details
- Born: February 21, 1933 (age 93) Balta, North Dakota, U.S.
- Party: Democratic

Ben Axtman (born February 21, 1933), also known as Benjamin J. Axtman, is an American politician. He served as a Democratic member of the North Dakota Senate.

== Life and career ==
Axtman was born in Balta, North Dakota. He was a farmer.

Axtman served in the North Dakota Senate from 1987 to 1990.
