= Eitan Mor =

Israeli hostage taken by Hamas in 2023

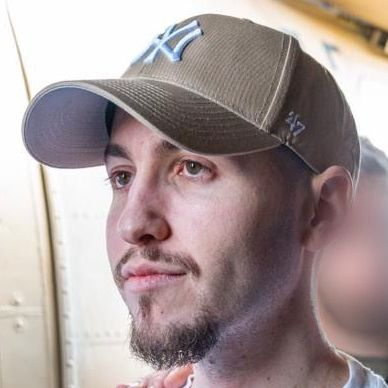
- Eitan Mor
- Born: May 30, 2000 (age 26)
- Known for: the Gaza war hostage crisis

Eitan Mor (Hebrew: איתן מור; born 30 May 2000) is an Israeli civilian who was abducted to the Gaza Strip during the October 7 attacks after being taken from the Nova music festival near Kibbutz Re’im. He was held in captivity for 738 days and was released on 13 October 2025 (Hoshana Rabbah) as part of the third hostage-release agreement.

== Early life ==
Eitan Mor is the son of Efrat and Tzvika Mor, the latter of whom serves as chairman of the Tikva Forum, an organization representing families of hostages. The family lives in Kiryat Arba, in which Mor grew up. Prior to his abduction, he worked as an unarmed security guard at large public events, including the Nova music festival near Kibbutz Re’im. In addition to his work in security, Mor had professional experience in the culinary field and aspired to open his own restaurant.

== Abduction ==
Between 6 October 2023 and 7 October 7 2023, the Nova music festival was held near Kibbutz Re’im in the Gaza border region. Mor was employed at the event as an unarmed security guard. On the morning of October 7, Hamas launched a surprise attack on communities in the area, involving the murder, rape, and abduction of civilians and soldiers.

During the attack, Mor assisted festivalgoers by helping to evacuate victims and retrieve the bodies of women who had been killed, actions later described in eyewitness accounts and family statements. He carried out these efforts together with his friend Elyakim Libman, who was killed that day. At approximately 14:00, contact with Mor was lost, and for several days he was considered missing. It was later determined that he had been abducted to the Gaza Strip, and for many months his fate remained unknown.

Following his release, Mor testified that he was abducted by eight civilians, some of them children, possibly of third-grade age, who handed him over to Hamas operatives. Shortly before being abducted, he had moved Shira Eylon's body with the help of Rom Braslavski. When Mor and Braslavski returned to move another body, Braslavski was abducted while Mor briefly escaped being abducted as well.

== Captivity ==
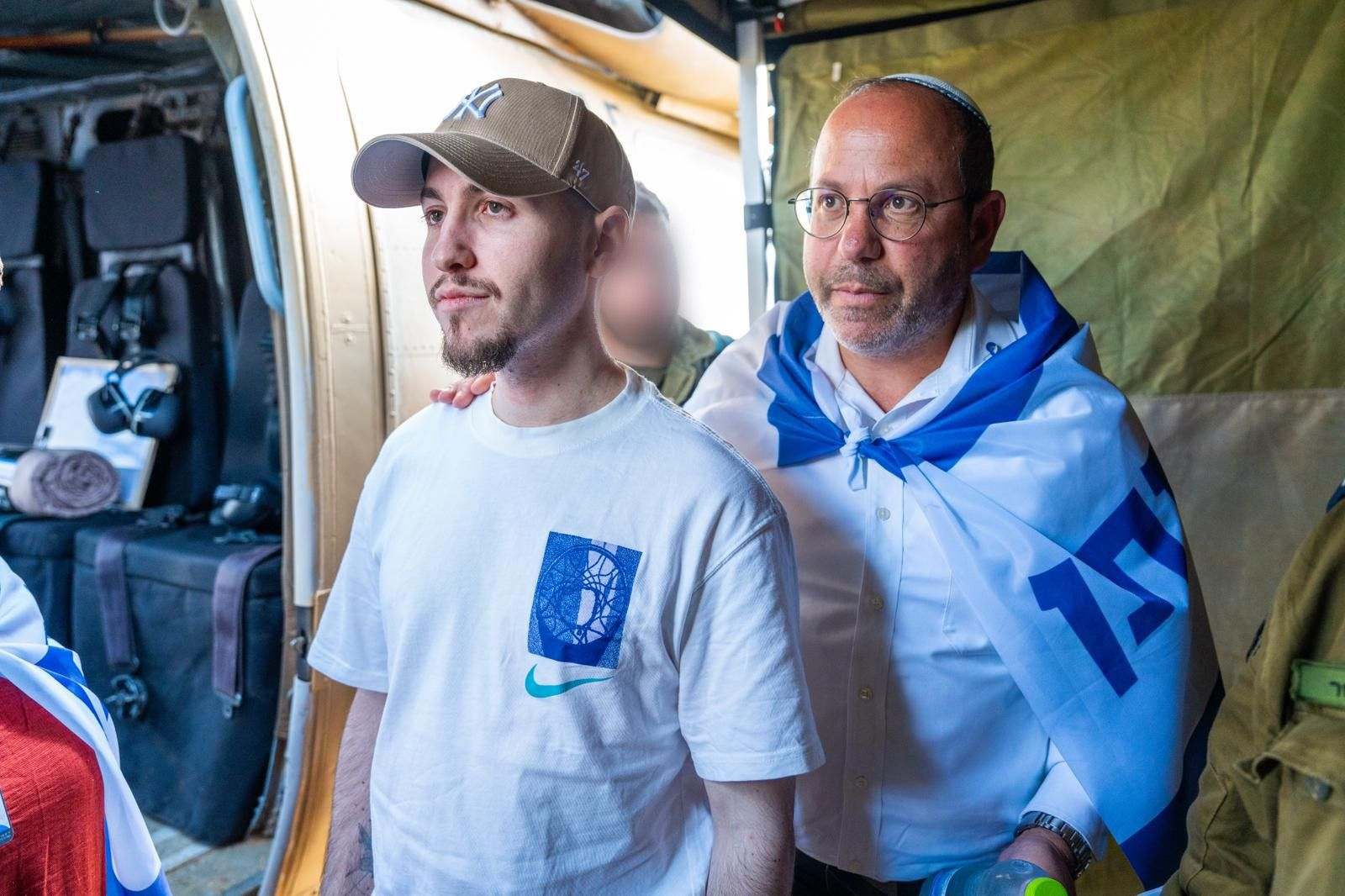
Eitan Mor and his father upon his release from captivity

According to his father, during the first three days after being taken into Gaza, Mor was bound with his hands tied behind his back, and during the first year of captivity he was held completely alone. Over the course of approximately two years, he was moved between around 40 hiding places, all located in Gaza City, both above and below ground.

Mor endured periods of severe hunger, at times receiving only a few spoonfuls of rice per day. He lost 15 kilos of muscle. In an interview after his release, he recounted being tortured during his captivity. During his captivity, he cooked meals for his captors and taught them how to prepare food. He also learned Arabic and formed a close friendship with fellow hostage Ziv Berman.

During his time in captivity, Mor met several times with Izz al-Din al-Haddad, commander of Hamas’s Gaza City Brigade and a senior figure in the organization. Mor described him as a level-headed individual who insisted on respectful treatment and, on occasion, threatened other militants, stating that if anything happened to Mor, “he would kill them.” Mor further recounted that when one of his captors claimed that his father did not care about him and was not participating in demonstrations, al-Haddad responded that the father loved him but was working for his release “in a different way,” adding that Mor should be released first because “his father does not help us and does not serve our objectives.”

In February 2025, a sign of life was received from Mor. After his release Mor, stated that for one year he had been held in a family home that contained a bathroom, shower, and kitchen.

== Release ==
Mor was released from Hamas captivity on 13 October 2025, Hoshana Rabbah, after 738 days in captivity, as part of the Gaza peace plan. His medical condition upon release was reported to be good.

He met with Israeli prime minister Benjamin Netanyahu on 14 October 2025. Mor was among the 26 released hostages who visited U.S. president Donald Trump at the White House. Mor gave Trump a special dreidel.

== See also ==
- Kidnapping of Rom Braslavski
- List of Gaza war hostages
- Kidnapping of Elkana Bohbot
- Kidnapping of Evyatar David
- Kidnapping of Noa Argamani
- Bar Kupershtein
- Omer Shem Tov
- Ziv Berman
