= Tikva Forum =

Israeli organization advocating for October 7 hostages

The Tikva Forum (Hebrew: פורום תקווה) is a registered nonprofit organization created by the families of Israeli hostages who were kidnapped by Hamas and other Palestinian militant groups during the October 7 attacks. The Tikva Forum supports increasing military and civilian pressure on Hamas, and opposes hostage negotiations and withdrawal from the Gaza Strip.

== History ==
The group was created in November 2023, a month after the October 7 attacks on southern Israel. An investigation by Israeli newspaper Walla reported that the group was started by Galei Israel CEO David Shikri and Honenu CEO Shmuel Meidad. Israeli newspaper Calcalist reported links between the organization and right-wing politicians, including Minister of Heritage Amihai Eliyahu of the Otzma Yehudit party. According to Calcalist, Tikva Forum received funds from an organization named Union of Rabbis of Congregations in Israel, a nonprofit organization founded by Eliyahu and headed by his brother. The Eliyahu founded nonprofit has received funds from the Israeli government.

== Activities ==
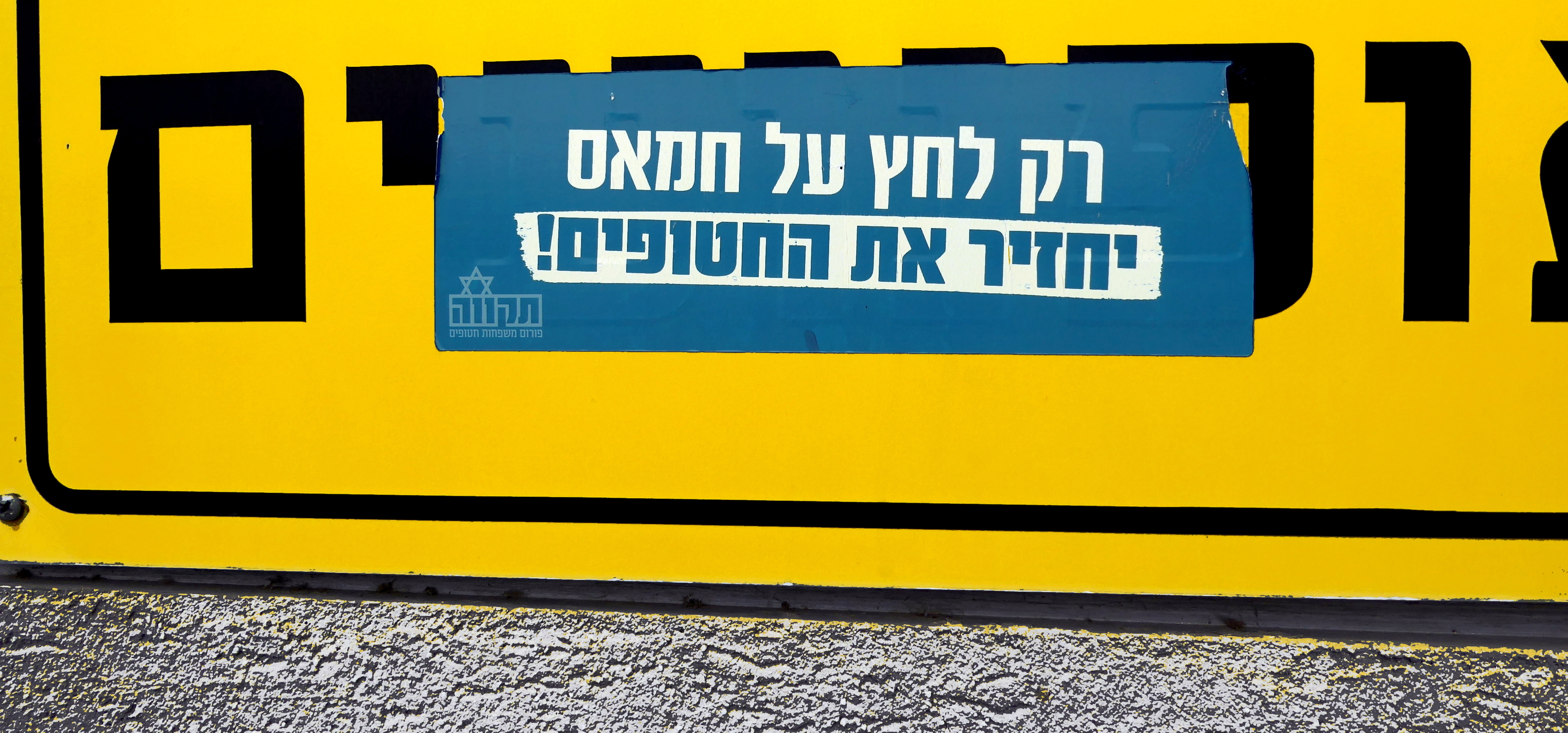
A Tikva Forum sticker reading "Pressure on Hamas is the only thing that will bring about a release of the hostages!"

The group criticized the January 2025 Gaza war ceasefire as a "dangerous compromise" with a "terrorist organization", and favors some hostages over others, rather than a comprehensive deal. They contrasted with the Hostages and Missing Families Forum, who supported the agreement. The Tikva Forum urged cabinet members who voted for the deal to resign for betraying the remaining hostages in captivity. They feel the deal will enable future massacres and kidnappings. The Forum organized protests against the proposed deal in January 2025, preferring the defeat of Hamas to a ceasefire, calling it a surrender.

The group uses "lectures, prayer rallies, demonstrations and media appearances" to support the use of force to defeat Hamas and return the hostages. They co-organized an event with the Hostages and Missing Families Forum, which featured music, prayer, and speeches. They criticized demands to release the hostages as enabling Hamas. have criticized the Hostages and Missing Families Forum's use of the phrase "bring them home now" for emboldening Hamas. Tikva Forum spokesman Eitan Zeliger told the Times of Israel that “[w]e feel that the demand to release hostages ‘now,’ that emphasis on ‘now,’ is liable — not intentionally, of course — to hurt the hostages,” adding that “it plays into the hands of Hamas, who might be encouraged to raise the price”, though several group members also told the newspaper that they were grateful to the Hostages and Missing Persons Families leadership for providing both material and emotional support to the hostages’ families.

In early 2024, the group organized a protest at the Hostages Square in Tel Aviv, calling on the Israel Defense Forces to launch a military operation into Rafah to further pressure Hamas and other militant groups. Forum co-founder Tzvika Mor, who is also the father of hostage Eitan Mor, told the Jewish News Syndicate that “[w]e have to finish this war. We cannot let Hamas rise again in Gaza and because of that we must win.” Speakers at the protest also criticized members of the Hostages and Missing Families Forum for joining protests calling for the ousting of Israeli prime minister Benjamin Netanyahu. The father of Avinatan Or, who was kidnapped with his girlfriend Noa Argamani, told rally attendees that "[I am] calling on Prime Minister Netanyahu to enter Rafah."

Group members, speaking at a Jerusalem rally in April 2024, called for the reestablishment of Jewish civilian communities in the Gaza Strip.

In January 2025, hundreds of Forum members blocked main roads in Jerusalem to oppose the January 2025 hostage deal, labelling Netanyahu a traitor and telling the government “[y]ou have no mandate to surrender.” At the rally, Tikva Forum leaders urged U.S. president Donald Trump to intervene and force the Israeli government to occupy the Gaza Strip.

The Forum opposed the ceasefire during Donald Trump's Gaza peace plan in October 2025 at first, instead urging further military pressure to force the release of the remaining 48 hostages without releasing Palestinian prisoners. After the deal was finalized, Mor praised the release of all hostages at once, while Boaz Miran, brother of hostage Omri Miran said the results remain to be seen "in practice".

== See also ==
- Tsav 9
- Kidnapped from Israel
