= Tzvika Mor =

Psychologist

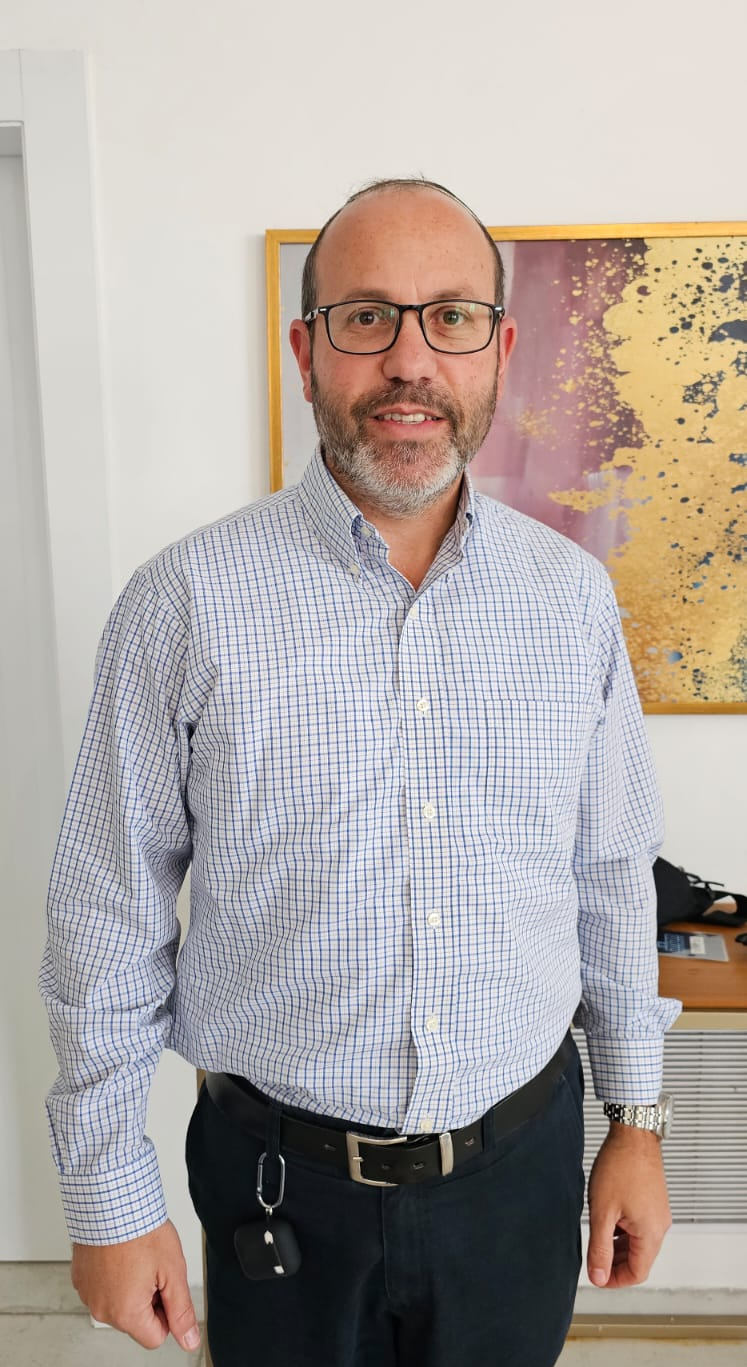

Faction represented in the Knesset
- 2026–: Religious Zionist Party

Personal details
- Born: 15 September 1976 (age 50) Bnei Brak, Israel
- Party: Religious Zionist Party
- Children: 8, including Eitan Mor
- Education: Lifshitz College of Education (2001); Herzog College (2017); University of Córdoba (PhD, 2025)
- Occupation: Chairman of the Tikva Forum

Tzvika Mor (born 15 September 1976) is an Israeli educator, psychologist, and public activist serving as chairman of the Tikva Forum, an association of families of Israeli hostages abducted to Gaza during the October 7 massacre. He is the father of Eitan Mor, who was kidnapped from the Nova music festival massacre and released two years later. Mor holds a PhD in psychology.

== Biography ==
Mor was born in Bnei Brak. He studied at the Nehalim Yeshiva High School, the Kiryat Shmona Hesder Yeshiva, and later (2000–2005) at Yeshivat Shavei Hebron. He served in the Paratroopers Brigade as part of the hesder program, and continues to serve in the 55th Paratroopers Reserve Brigade.

=== Professional career ===
Mor worked for several years as an educator at the Kiryat Arba Yeshiva High School and as a teacher at the Kiryat Arba Ulpana for girls. In 2012–2013 he taught at the Horev Yeshiva High School in Jerusalem.

He earned a bachelor's degree in education from Lifshitz College of Education in 2001. In 2013–2014 he wrote a column titled "Education Series" for Arutz Sheva. In 2016 he was certified as a senior coach and trainer by the Israeli Coaching Association, and in 2017 completed a master's degree in management and organization of educational systems at Herzog College. In 2020, he completed an NLP course at Totsaot College in Tel Aviv.

In 2025 Mor earned a doctorate in psychology from the University of Córdoba, specializing in ADHD. His dissertation, supervised by Prof. Eliana M. Moreno, was titled "The Effect of a Cognitive-Behavioral Coaching (CBC) Model on Self-Regulation in Adolescents with ADHD". Mor is not registered in Israel's official psychologists’ registry and is not a licensed clinical practitioner.

== Public activity ==
Following the abduction of his son during the October 7 attacks, Mor and several other families founded the Tikva Forum, after separating from the official Hostages and Missing Families Forum. The forum advocates military pressure on Hamas, opposes partial hostage deals, and calls for continued Israeli military presence along the Philadelphi Corridor, the Morag Axis, and the Netzarim Corridor until all war objectives are achieved.

In 2025, Mor served on the judging panel of the World Bible Quiz for Jewish Youth. He received the Zionism Award at the 2024 Israeli Right Conference, and was honored by the Bnei Akiva movement for "steadfast national spirit during wartime". He was later named “Person of the Year” for 2025 by the weekly magazine B'Sheva.

As chairman of the Tikva Forum during the Iron Swords War, Mor appeared hundreds of times in Israeli and international media, including The Jerusalem Post and The Times of Israel. He also held press conferences in the Knesset, the Kirya in Tel Aviv, and elsewhere, and appeared before several Knesset committees including Foreign Affairs and Defense and Constitution, Law and Justice. He frequently delivers lectures in synagogues, community centers, and educational institutions.

In May 2026, Mor announced he was joining the Religious Zionist Party, with party leader Bezalel Smotrich stating he would assign Mor to one of the first slots on the party's electoral list.

== Personal life ==
Mor is married to Efrat; they have eight children and live in Kiryat Arba. During the Gaza war, while his son was held hostage, Mor served in the IDF reserves in northern Israel.
