= Omer Shem Tov =

Israeli hostage of Hamas

- עומר שם טוב
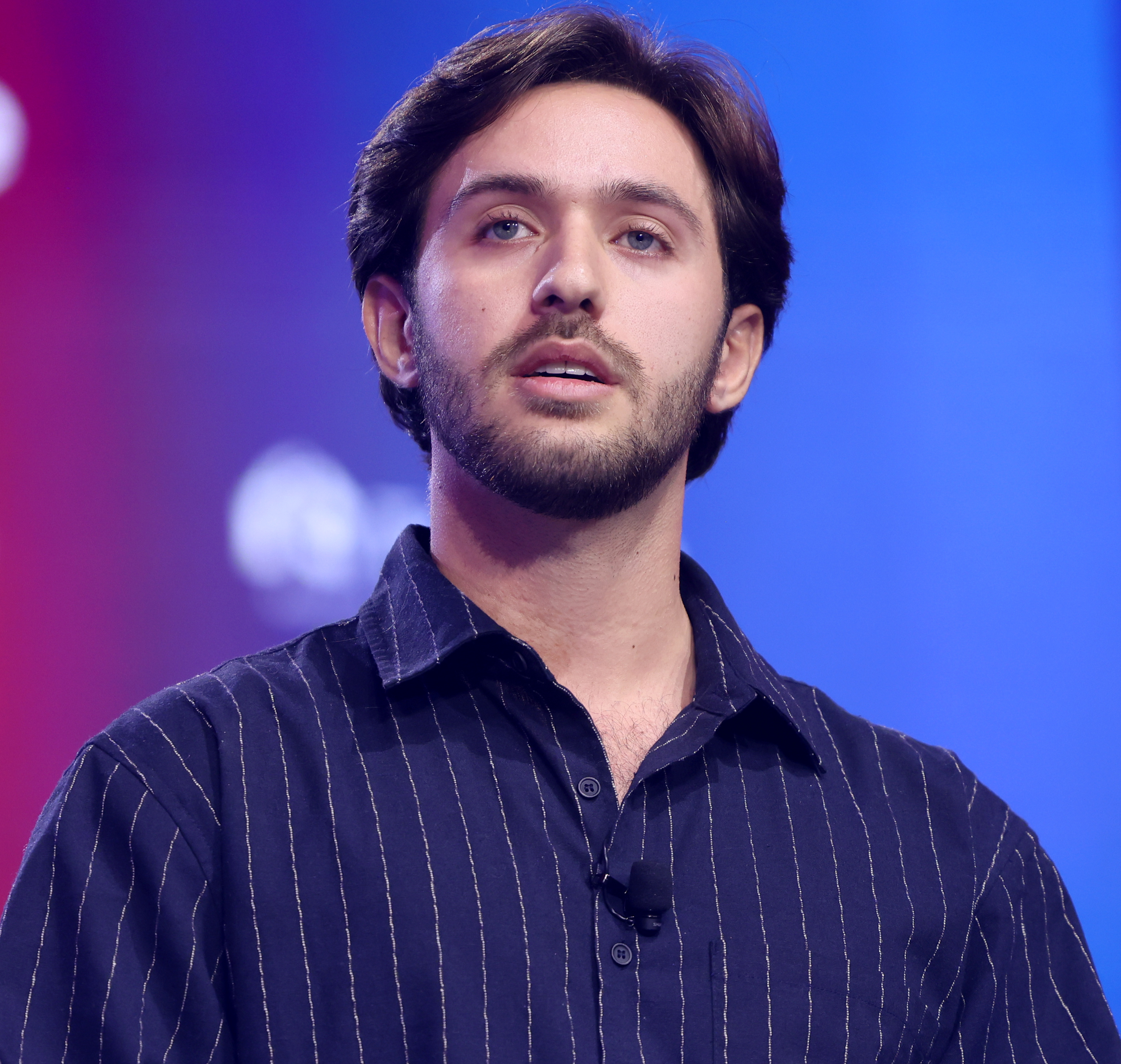
- Born: October 31, 2002 (age 23)
- Known for: Hostage in Gaza (2023–2025)

Omer Shem Tov (Hebrew: עומר שם טוב) is a former Israeli hostage who was abducted by Hamas from the Nova music festival on October 7, 2023, and held captive in Gaza for 505 days. His ordeal, including reports of abuse and his refusal to cooperate with captors’ demands to harm others, were widely covered in major news outlets and made him a symbol of the ongoing hostage crisis and its impact on Israeli society. Just after his abduction, Shem Tov's parents became among the founding members of the Hostages and Missing Families Forum. His uncle traveled to the Red Cross headquarters in Geneva to petition for medical assistance on his behalf. Following his release in February 2025, Shem Tov traveled internationally to advocate for the release of remaining hostages, appeared at public events, and met with political leaders.

== Background ==
Shem Tov was born on October 31, 2002. Shem Tov grew up in a largely secular household in Herzliya, but described himself as always retaining a sense of faith. At the age of seven, he attended a rally for the release of Gilad Shalit, who was held by Hamas for five years before being freed in a prisoner exchange in 2011. His family described him as loving and outgoing. Shem Tov completed his compulsory military service in 2023. At the time of his abduction, he worked as a waiter in a steakhouse in Tel Aviv to earn money for a planned trip to South America. He also worked as a DJ and organized musical events. His bedroom decor reflected his musical tastes, featuring a rap album poster and his guitar.

== Kidnapping on October 7, 2023 ==
Shem Tov was kidnapped from the Nova music festival along with his friends, siblings Maya and Itay Regev. Hearing gunshots, they tried to flee on foot, but Shem Tov was shoved to the ground and bound with his hands behind his back. Ori Danino, whom they had met the night before, fled and then returned with a car. While attempting to escape to safety, they were blocked by Hamas pickup trucks and fired upon. Itay and Maya sustained bullet wounds to their legs. Shem Tov and the Regev siblings were loaded onto a pickup truck amid shouts of “Allahu Akbar”. They were driven to a small storage unit in Gaza, and Shem Tov was taken underground. Danino, who was also abducted, was later killed in captivity.

== Captivity ==
Maya and Itay Regev were released in the November 2023 weeklong truce-hostage deal, and Shem Tov was held alone. One of his captors was a doctor who provided Shem Tov with an inhaler for his asthma. He was not allowed to cough out loud or make noise, and was held largely in darkness. Shem Tov said his captors cursed and spat on him. He stated that they threatened to shoot him in the head if he would not help collapse a booby-trapped building on IDF troops, but he responded "Then shoot me in the head. I have no intention of doing it.” Shem Tov said he found favor with his captors by cooking and cleaning for them.

Shem Tov said he picked up one of his captors' weapons while they slept and considered shooting them, but lost his nerve, fearing that the gun would jam. He was initially given two pitas a day, despite having celiac disease. Later, he was fed only a biscuit and a small amount of salty water for much of his captivity. Just before his release, his captors gave him chocolate, chicken and rice. According to his father, he had lost 17 kilograms (37 pounds).

== Release ==
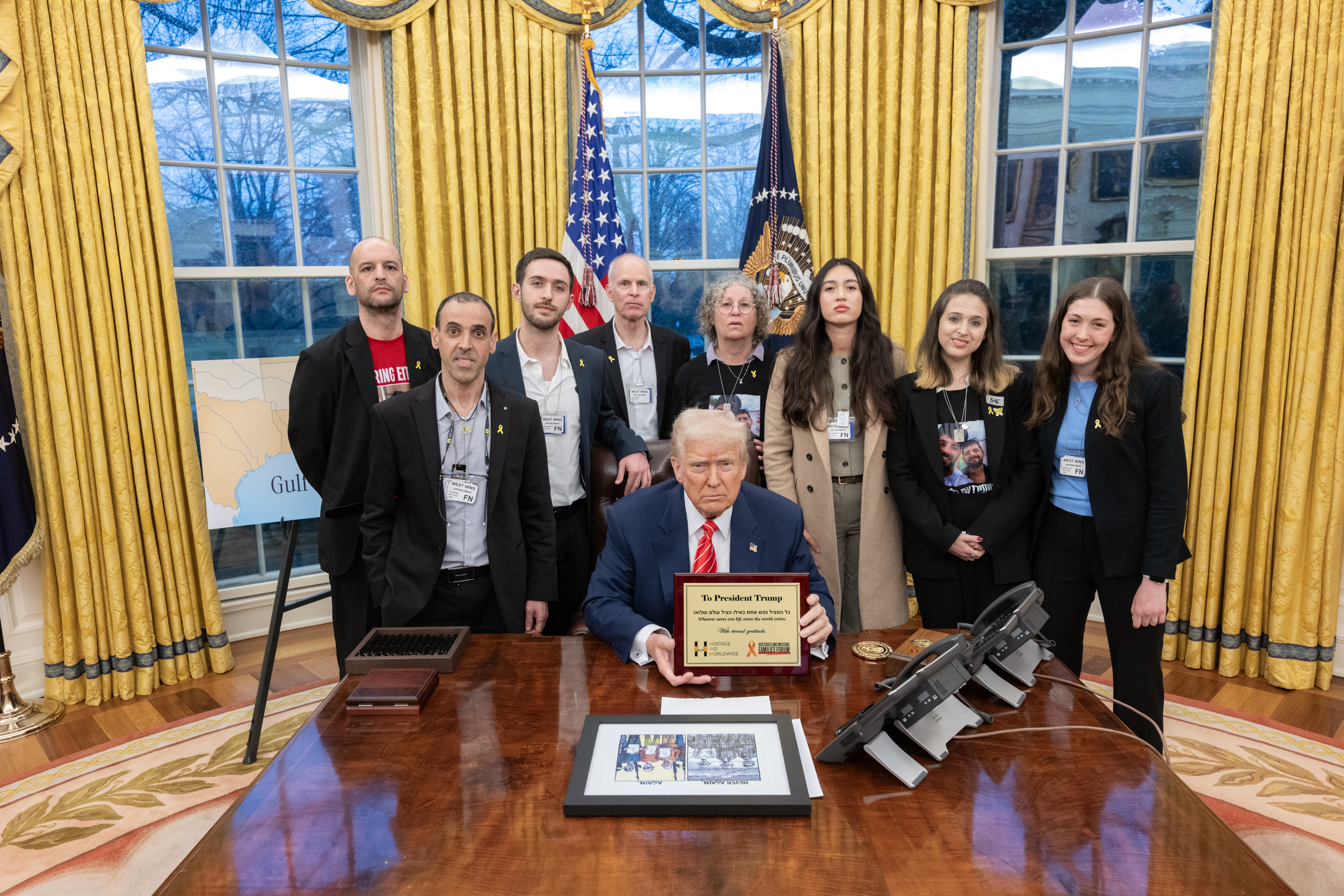
Shem Tov and other former hostages meeting with President Trump in the Oval Office (2025)

Shem Tov was released on February 22, 2025 along with Tal Shoham, Eliya Cohen and Omer Wenkert as part of a ceasefire agreement with Hamas. He learned of his impending release from an announcement on television. Avera Mengistu and Hisham al-Sayed were released separately on the same day. At the release ceremony, Shem Tov was instructed to kiss a Hamas cameraman on the head. Though hesitant, he carried out the instruction, and was transferred to the Red Cross, which transported him back to Israel. While being airlifted by helicopter, he wrote on a white board, “Now everything is OK! Thank you to the dear people of Israel, and to all the soldiers! I want a hamburger". He appeared "elated" when he reunited with his parents at a reception center inside Israel.

== Post-release activities ==
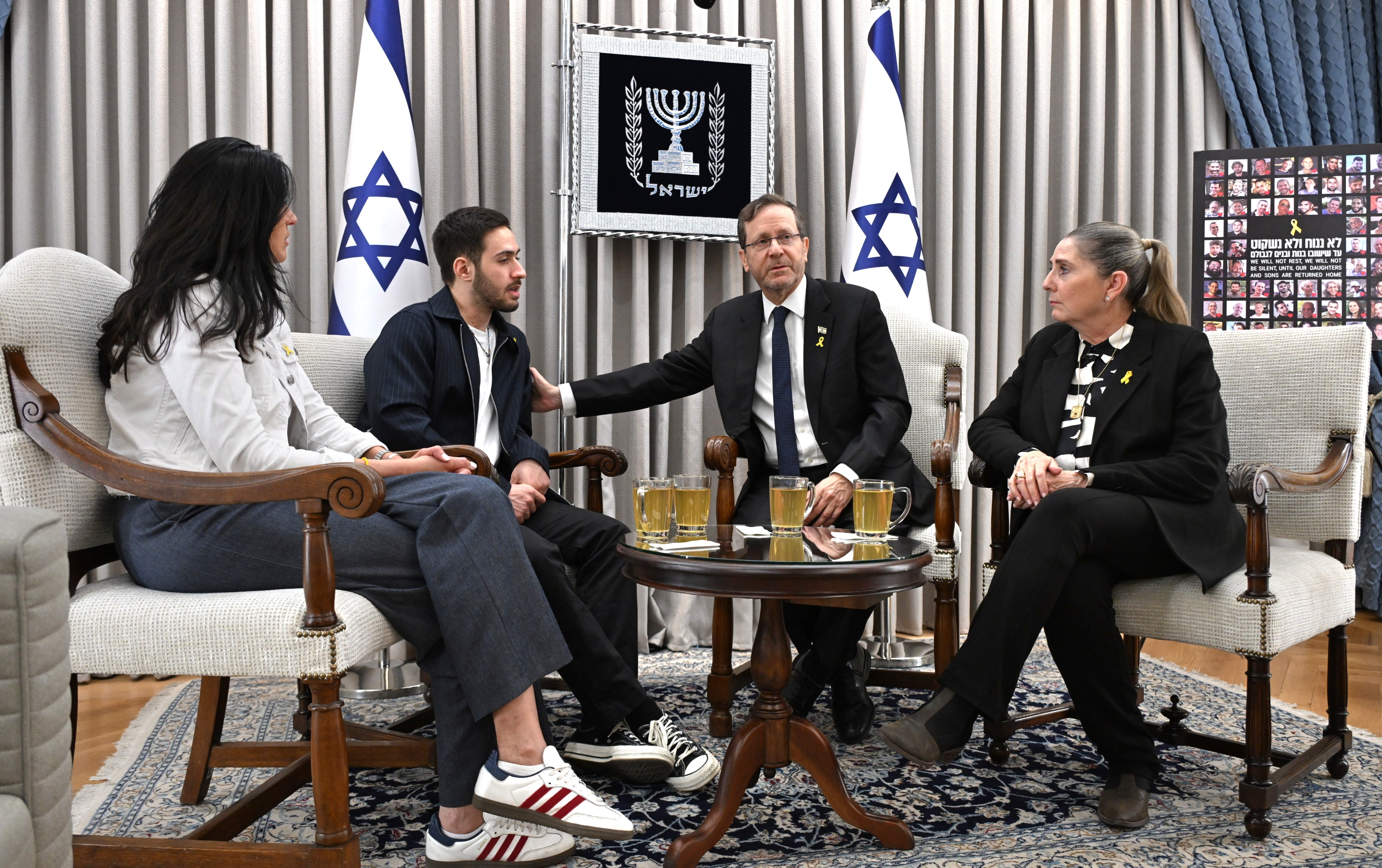
Shem Tov and his mother speaking with Israeli President Isaac Herzog and Michal Herzog after Shem Tov's release.

Shem Tov and his mother Shelly were greeted by Israeli President Herzog at the President's Residence in Jerusalem. Nine days after his release, Shem Tov flew to Washington D.C. to meet President Trump in the Oval Office, along with freed hostages Eli Sharabi, Doron Steinbrecher, Keith Siegel, Aviva Siegel, Naama Levy, Iair Horn and Noa Argamani.

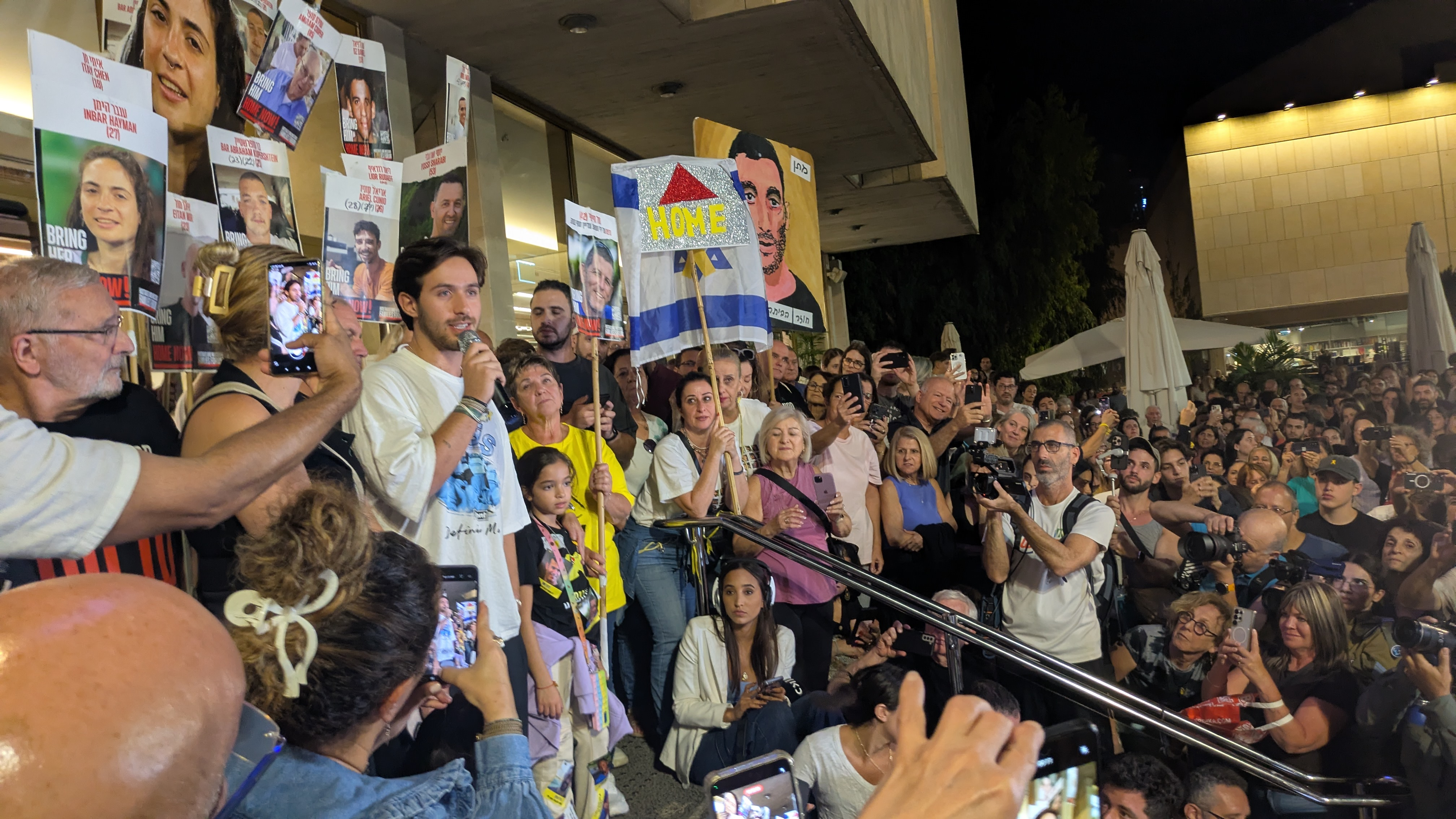
Omer Shem Tov speaking at Hostages Square in Tel Aviv, 9 October 2025, following the announcement of the impending release of Israeli hostages.

Shem Tov's favorite footballer, Norwegian star Erling Haaland, called him as a goodwill gesture. Musician Orian Shukron composed a song for him. In May 2025, Shem Tov threw the ceremonial first pitch at Fenway Park on Jewish Heritage Night, at the series opener against the New York Mets. His sneakers had “BRING THEM HOME NOW” emblazoned on the side, and he wore a Red Sox jersey with a yellow ribbon to commemorate his 58 fellow hostages who were still held in Gaza. Shem Tov removed his own hostage poster at Dancers' Square in his hometown of Herzliya, at the weekly rally for the hostages' return, together with Maya and Itay Regev. He took on additional forms of Jewish observance while in captivity and after returning home, as did his mother. Coincidentally, both Shem Tov and his mother were given copies of Psalm 20 during his captivity, Omer by his captors and Shelly by a group supporting hostages' families.

The Associated Press described Shem Tov's "newfound celebrity" as "unsought and at times unsettling".

== See also ==
- List of Gaza war hostages
