= Hostages and Missing Families Forum =

Israeli organization advocating for October 7 hostages

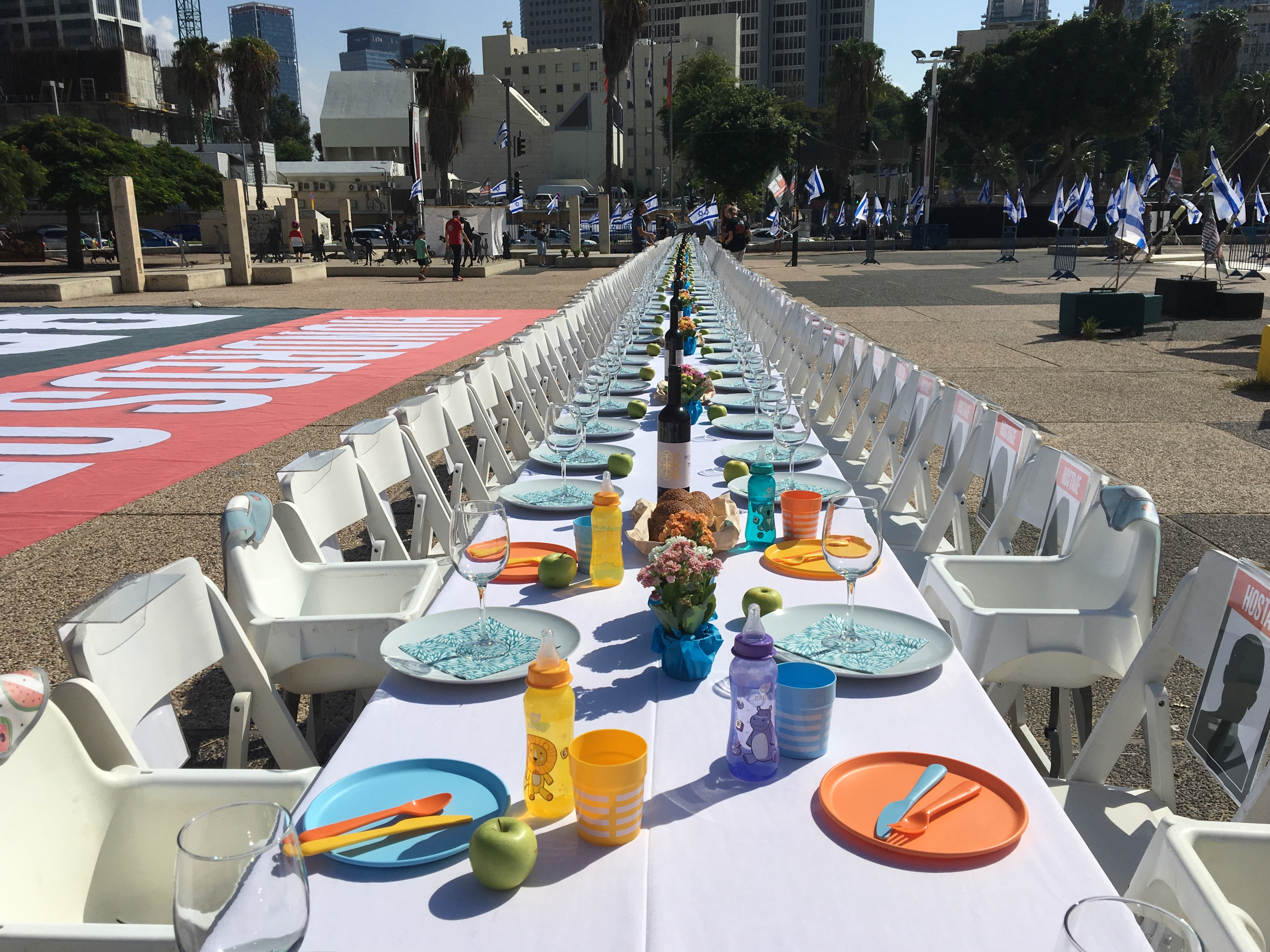
The "Sabbath Dinner" table, with more than 200 empty chairs representing the number of abductees and missing persons held in the Gaza Strip, at Hostages Square in Tel Aviv.

The Hostages and Missing Persons Families Forum (Hebrew: מטה המשפחות להחזרת החטופים והנעדרים) is a body established to support and advocate for the families of the abductees who were kidnapped to Gaza as part of the 7 October attacks in 2023, and for the families of the missing persons as a result of this attack. The forum aims to return the abductees from Gaza, to locate those missing from the attack, and to handle medical, legal and other matters related to the abduction and its consequences. It is a group that represents the hostages and kibbutz community and makes announcements of relevant news such as the deaths confirmed of the hostages.

== History ==
Within days of the Hamas-led attack on Israel on 7 October 2023, the families of at least 341 missing Israelis, who had either been kidnapped to Gaza or whose disposition was unknown, started a WhatsApp group to share information and organize. Three initiatives, led by former Israeli politician and communications professional Ronen Tzur, Haim Rubinstein, and Dudi Zalamanovitch united as the Hostages and Missing Families Forum by 13 October. Tzur was the group's director, Rubinstein was the spokesman, and Zalmanovitch donated office space. Tzur headed the Forum until he stepped down in February 2024. The Forum, along with most individual relatives of hostages, have attempted to avoid partisan politics or confrontation with Israel's right-wing coalition government.

Shortly after the 7 October attacks, the Forum headquarters issued three demands, namely the immediate release of all hostages, the immediate opening of a humanitarian corridor to supply medicine to hostages, and intervention and aid from neighboring countries to assist in the release of the hostages.

== Activities ==
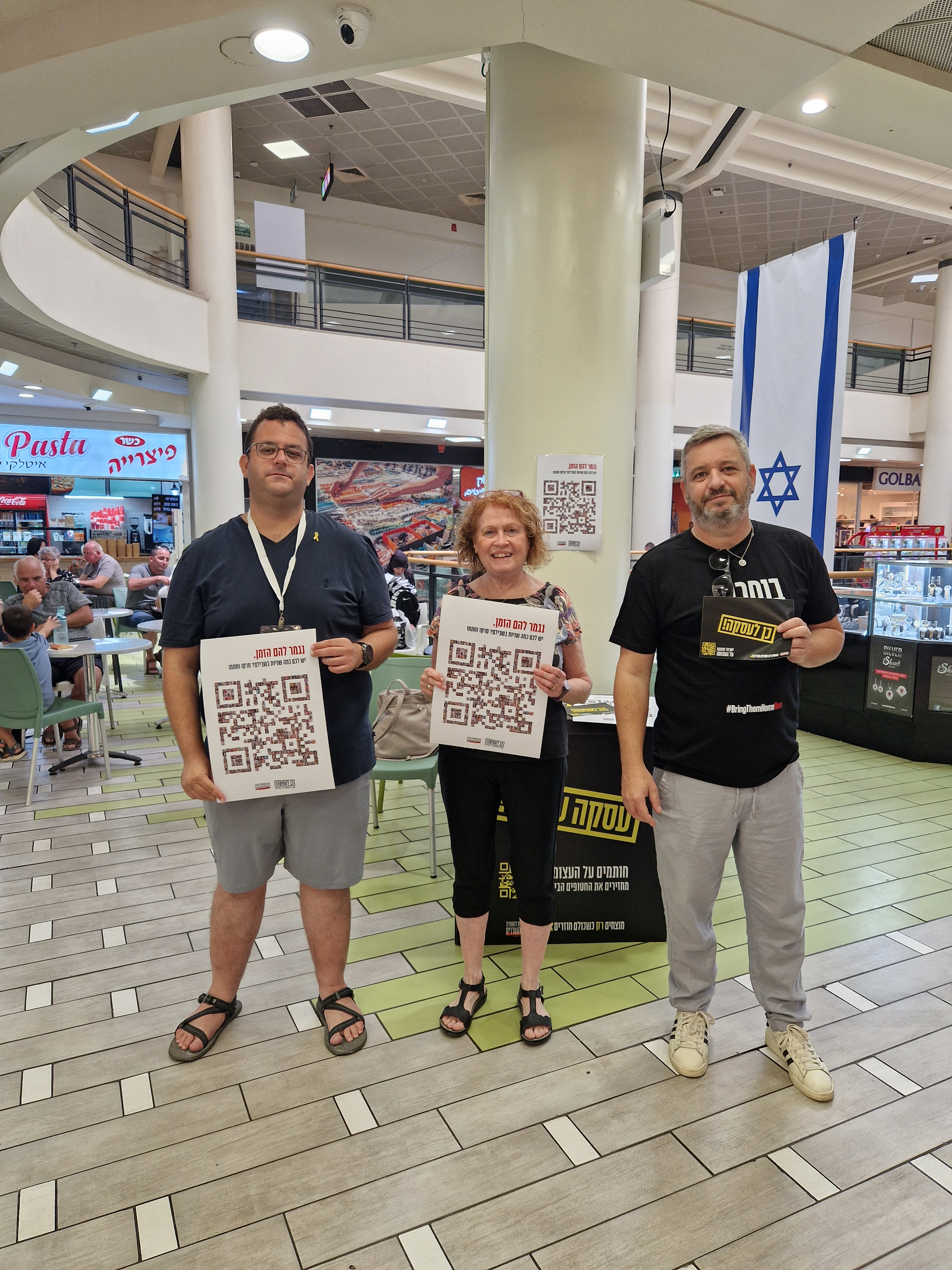
Members asking for signatures calling for the return of hostages at Lev HaMifratz Mall in Haifa.

During the first week, the group organized a fundraising drive that raised $500,000 and organized a meeting attended by 500 family members with Gal Hirsch, the Israeli government official coordinating hostage affairs. The group launched the hashtag #BringThemHomeNow. The Forum recruited hundreds of volunteers in Israel and the United States, including psychologists, social media and communications professionals, former hostages, and former government officials such as David Meidan, who was involved in negotiating the Gilad Shalit prisoner exchange.

In November 2023 hostages families set off on a five day march from the Hostages Square to the Prime Ministers office to present a demand for the release of all hostages.

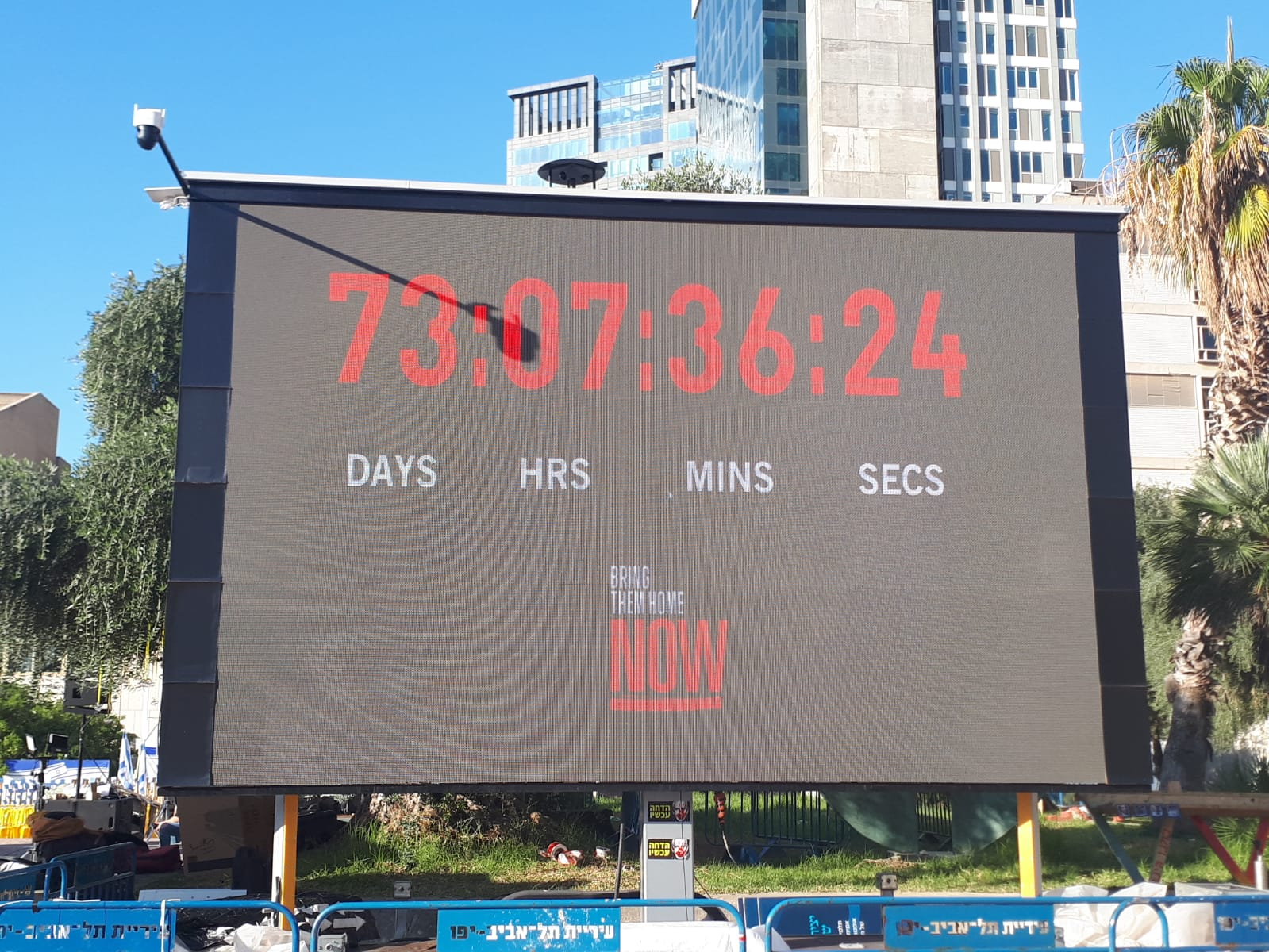
Clock displayed in the Hostages Square counting the time that the hostages have spent being held by Hamas.

In February 2024, the Hostages and Missing Families Forum filed a war crimes complaint against Hamas at the International Court of Justice. The complaint included charges against Hamas leaders of "kidnapping, crimes of sexual violence, torture and other serious allegations". The Forum was awarded the Genesis Prize, also referred to as the Jewish Nobel Prize, alongside the JAFI Fund for Victims of Terror; Lev Echad; NATAL-The Israel Trauma and Resiliency Center; and OneFamily-Overcoming Terror Together.

In April 2025, the Forum published a health report of the currently 24 remaining hostages in Gaza based on prior medical histories, documented images and videos published of them by Hamas, and testimonies about the conditions, statuses and treatment from released hostages. The report alleges from testimony from hostages released in January-March 2025 that there was a severe shortage of food, water and medical care leading to malnutrition, weakness and deterioration of their health. Additionally, the report alleges that the hostages were subject to physical and mental torture, such as being chained for weeks or months at a time, starvation, being hung by their legs, burns and being held in underground tunnels deprived of natural light and air.

After a May 2025 report that suggested that Israeli officials were preparing for operations to "resettle the Gaza Strip", the Forum spoke out against the plan. Members raised concerns that the government was not focused on the hostages still held, and cited statistics showing that 70% of Israelis oppose resettlement.

The group raised allegations in June 2025 that the Israeli government was abandoning the effort to bring the remaining hostages back to Israel from Gaza. Israeli officials had begun a campaign against Iran while the group argued that negotiators could instead be dispatched to Doha to reach a deal releasing the hostages. During a closed Knesset Foreign Affairs and Defense Committee meeting, Foreign Minister Gideon Sa'ar rejected claims that the government had 'abandoned and neglected' the hostages.

In early September 2025, the Forum issued a statement demanding that Benjamin Netanyahu immediately act and send negotiators to discuss a ceasefire and hostage deal after Hamas expressed willingness to negotiate a deal. The statement also called out the delay in response by the Israeli government in reacting to Hamas's response to the Gaza peace plan announced by Netanyahu and US President Trump. The group also issued a statement condemning the recognition of the Palestinian state in September 2025, prior to the release of the remaining hostages in Gaza. In late September 2025 after Hamas released an collage of all remaining hostages from the 7 October attacks and named them Ron Arad after a missing Israeli air force member, the Forum held large scale rallies. The first rally was held in Hostages Square in Tel Aviv with the second at the Paris Square in Jerusalem near Netanyahu's home.

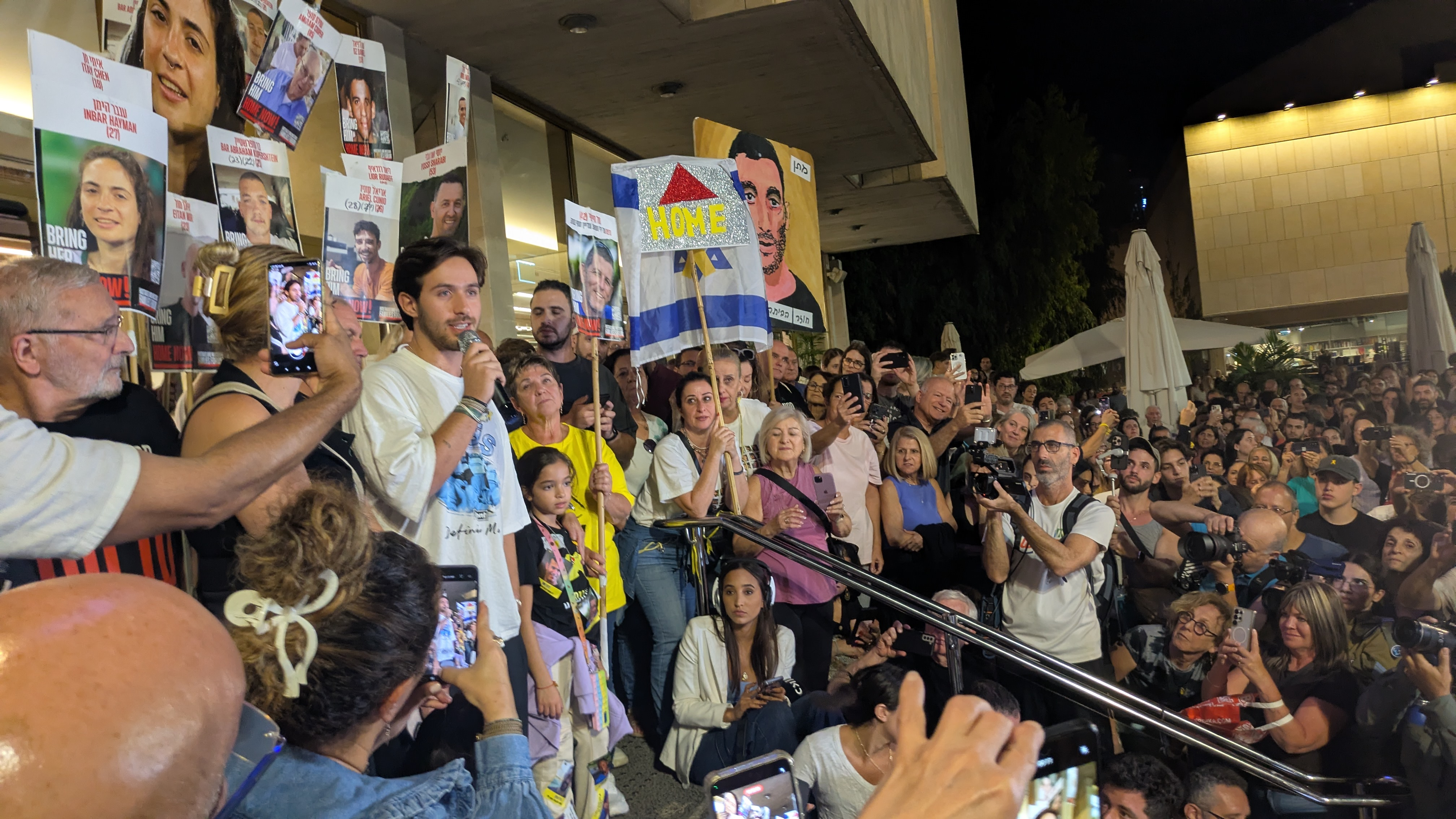
Omer Shem Tov speaking at Hostages Square in Tel Aviv, 9 October 2025, following the announcement of the impending release of Israeli hostages.

On 13 October 2025, the first day on hostage release and body return under the peace plan, the Forum condemned the release of only four out of the twenty-eight reportedly deceased hostages, calling it a "blatant" breach of the ceasefire agreement. However, several families of deceased hostages had been told by Israeli authorities that their deceased relatives would not be immediately released. On that day, the Forum organised a livestream from Hostages Square of the hundreds who gathered at the square to watch the release of the hostages on a jumbotron.

== See also ==
- Tikva Forum
- Kidnapped from Israel
- Israeli hostage deal protests
- International reactions to the Gaza war
