= Kidnapped from Israel =

Public art campaign during Gaza war

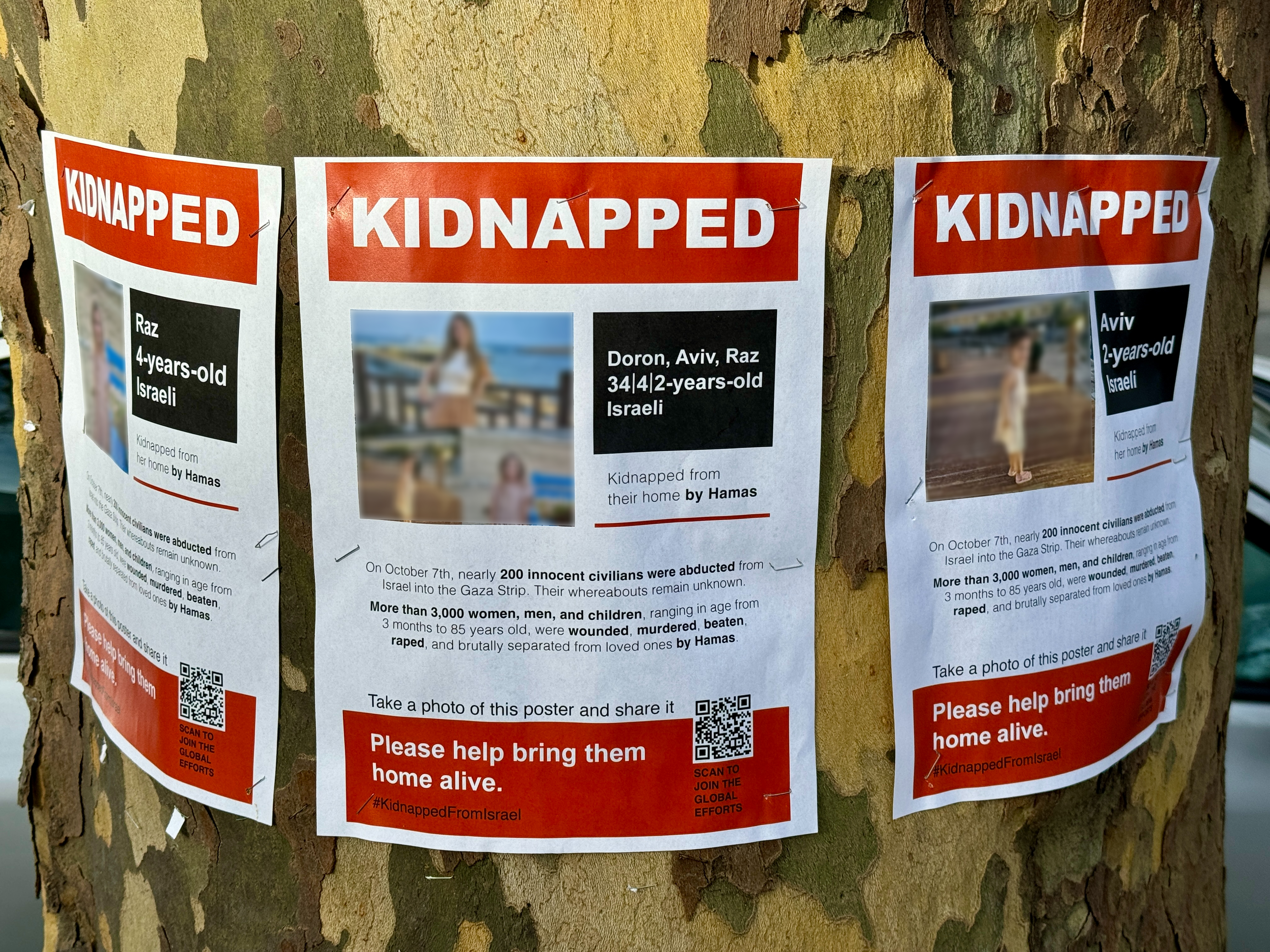
Kidnapped from Israel posters

Kidnapped from Israel is a flyer campaign started by Israeli artists Nitzan Mintz, Dede Bandaid and Tal Huber shortly after the 7 October 2023 attack on Israel, in the early stages of the Gaza war and hostage crisis. The flyers contain images of individuals taken in the attacks and are modeled on the missing persons on milk cartons practice from the 1980s in the US. Mintz and Bandaid made the flyers freely and publicly available online, in 22 languages. The flyers have proliferated in cities and on campuses around the world.

Some have seen the project as public street art, while others have seen it as wartime propaganda intended to influence the battle of narratives in the Israeli–Palestinian conflict.

People have been punished for removing them.

== Background ==
Kidnapped from Israel was created by Israeli artists Nitzan Mintz, Dede Bandaid and Tal Huber, Creative designer and owner of the branding company Giraff. Dede and Nitzan were on a three-month residency program in New York City from Israel when the Gaza war broke out in 2023 and Palestinian militant group Hamas kidnapped and took hostage more than 200 Israelis during its attack on Israel, ranging from 9 months to 85 years old. Several days after the initial attack, Mintz, Bandaid, and Israel-based graphic designers Tal Huber created the posters as downloadable digital files. The campaign spread as a grassroots effort and was amplified by actors Gal Gadot, Amy Schumer, and Jack Black.

== Stylization and spread ==
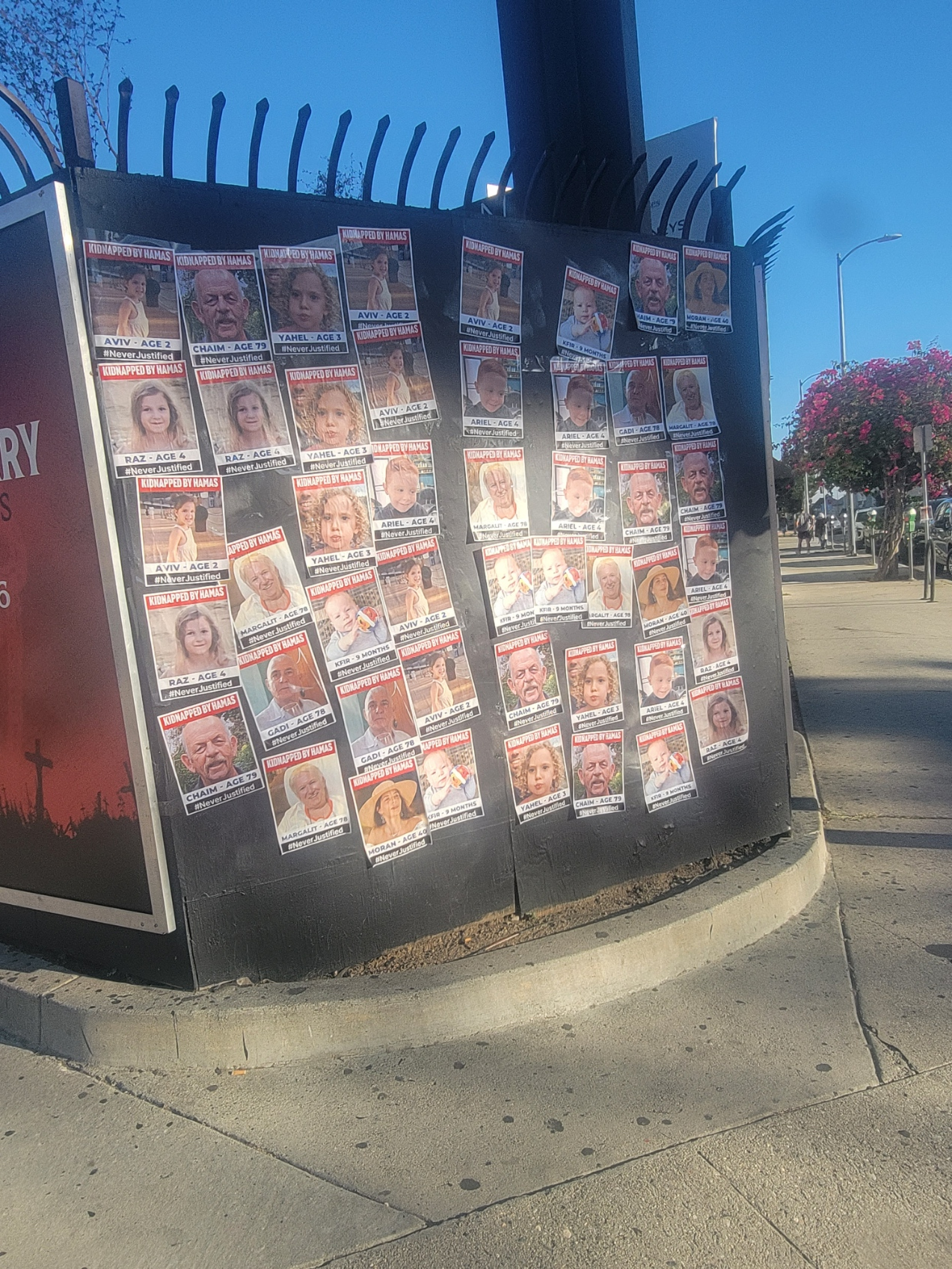
Kidnapped posters in Los Angeles

According to Bandaid, the artists were inspired by the images of missing persons on milk cartons from the 1980s and chose the colors and fonts for the fliers to resemble them. The campaign consists of paper fliers bearing a banner with the word "KIDNAPPED" and including photographs of a kidnapped Israeli. The fliers were posted on street lamps, trees, street signs, and in subway stations locations in cities around the world. In New York City, the artists put up thousands of fliers, and activists posted them in Berlin, Lisbon, and Buenos Aires. The artists relied on family members and friends of kidnapped individuals for names and photos to use on the fliers. The first run consisted of 2,000 copies posted around Manhattan.

Within weeks, the fliers had been posted in 30 languages and in locations from Sydney to Santiago, and including the UN building. According to Tim Zick of William & Mary Law School, regulations about the posting of the fliers were generally made by local governments and individual college campuses. The campaign inspired a similar movement in Los Angeles to use billboards to highlight young Israelis among the kidnapped. Senator John Fetterman covered his office in the posters, saying that "they will stay up until every single person is safely returned home."

The New York Times described the posters as "emerging symbols of Israelis' national pain" after the Hamas attack on Israel and compared them to the fliers posted by family members after the September 11 terrorist attacks. However, according to Mintz, the fliers are not meant to be memorials out of a hope that the subjects were still alive. Instead, she intended the campaign to be a way for Jews to deal with their fear during a tough time. After the success of the campaign, Mintz and Bandaid withdrew from the residency in New York City to focus on the project and the media attention.

== Controversy over poster removals ==
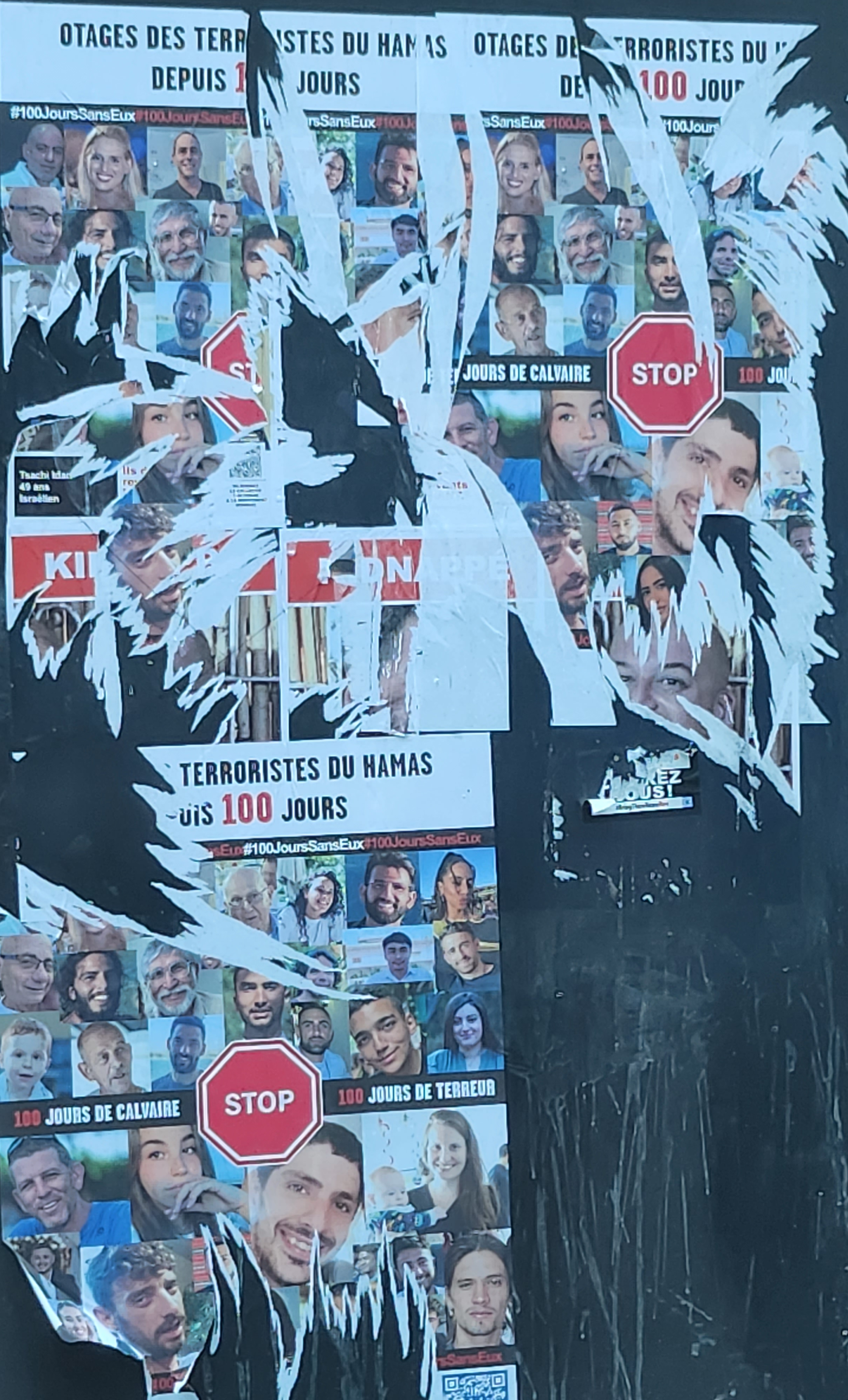
Damaged Kidnapped posters located in Paris, France - March 2024

In some cities and on college campuses, the fliers were taken down, some as soon as they were put up. According to The New York Times, individuals who object to the posters deride them as wartime propaganda lacking context of the Israeli–Palestinian conflict. Critics characterize the tear downs as antisemitic and "lacking basic humanity." To Mintz, the artist, the act is clear antisemitism, but brought awareness to the level of hatred the Jewish community faces.

Police in the United Kingdom, including in London and in Prestwich, an area of Manchester with a large Jewish population, received criticism in late October 2023 for taking down the posters after receiving complaints. The Metropolitan Police removed the posters to "avoid any further increase in community tension."

=== Accusations of antisemitism ===
According to The Forward, the Anti-Defamation League (ADL), which has been criticized for its conflation of anti-Zionism or criticism of Israel with antisemitism, categorized "people tearing down posters of kidnapped Israelis alongside instances of swastika graffiti and bomb threats toward synagogues" in its records of incidents of antisemitism during the Gaza war. The advocacy group American Jewish Committee has also called removing the posters "antisemitism."

=== Response to poster removals ===
Incidents of removals, and subsequent confrontations, frequently spread on social media. In some cases, removal led to criminal charges. For example, in February 2026, Fiona Monro, a 58‑year‑old woman from Brighton, England, was convicted of theft in connection with a February 2024 incident in which she removed and discarded a laminated poster of Israeli hostage Tsachi Idan from a public memorial in Palmeira Square; a jury acquitted her of related criminal damage charges. Monro received an 18‑month conditional discharge with prosecution costs.

While most incidents of removal in New York City took place on public property, the New York Police Department arrested two people in November 2023 for allegedly tearing down posters on private property. After videos of individuals removing the posters spread widely on social media, some were fired from their jobs.

White House Press Secretary Karine Jean-Pierre stated that, "Tearing down pictures of their loved ones — who are being held hostage by Hamas — is wrong and hurtful." Nora Berman of Jewish publication The Forward called the removals a sign that "many people cannot hold space for the suffering of two peoples."

== See also ==
- Hostages and Missing Families Forum
- Tikva Forum
- International reactions to the Gaza war
