= Hostages Square =

Public square in Tel Aviv, Israel

- כיכר החטופים
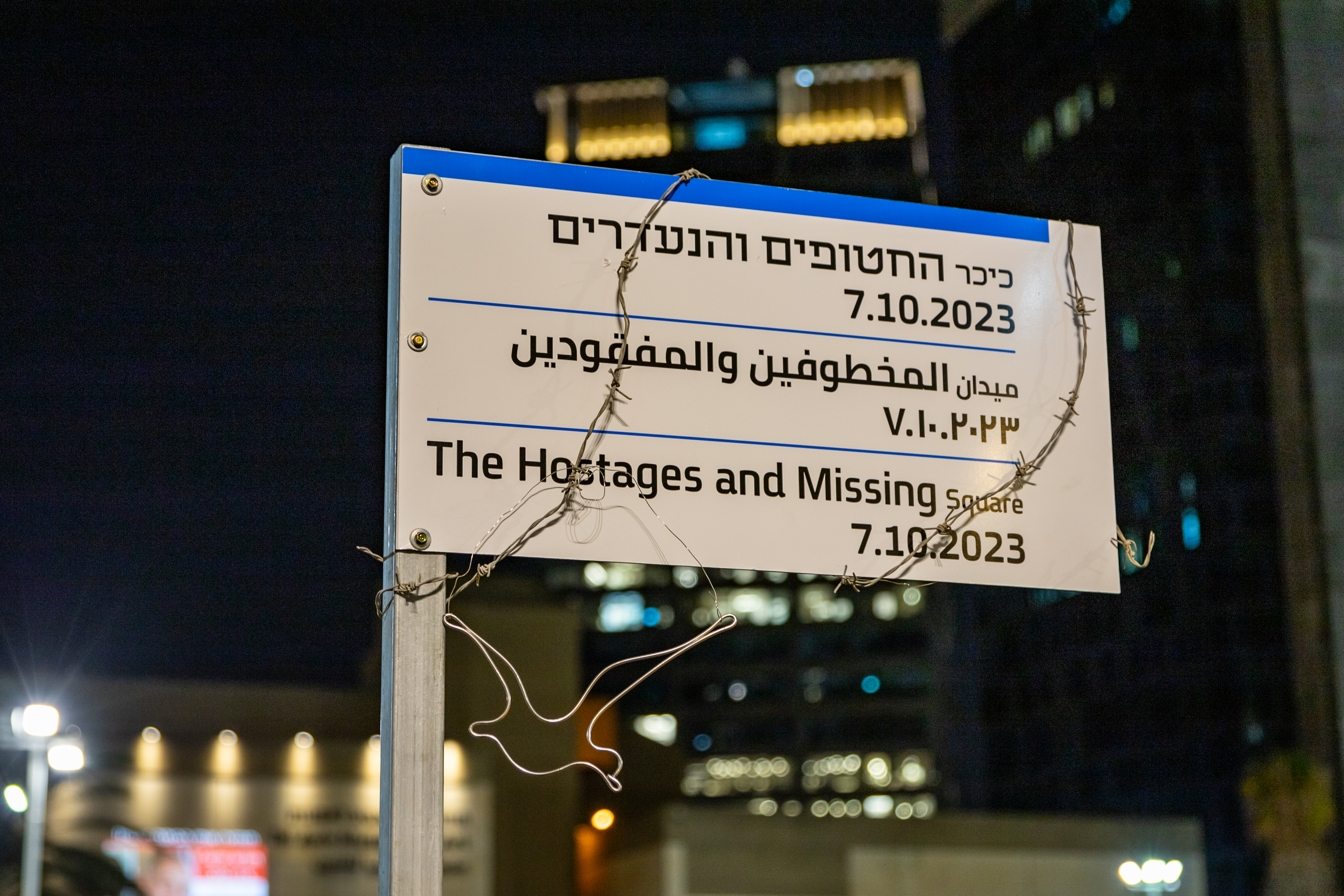
- Interactive fullscreen map
- Location: Tel Aviv, Israel
- Coordinates: 32.0770°N 34.7871°E
- Status: Open

Hostages Square (Hebrew: כיכר החטופים, romanized: Kikar HaChatufim) is a public plaza located in front of the Tel Aviv Museum of Art. In the wake of the October 7 attacks, families of the hostages established a permanent encampment in the square due to its proximity to the Israel Defense Forces headquarters. It has since become a central site for rallies and protests during the Gaza war, calling for the hostages' release.

== History ==
This plaza was originally named Museum Square (Hebrew: כיכר המוזיאון) because of its location in front of the Tel Aviv Museum of Art. This plaza became known as Hostages Square following the October 7 attacks in commemoration of the Gaza war hostage crisis. It became a gathering point for families of the hostages and their supporters, most notably the Hostages and Missing Families Forum, in raising awareness towards releasing the hostages. It also became a major gathering place for Israeli hostage deal protests as protesters hold rallies calling for hostage release.

On 3 November 2023, a "tent city" was established in the square by the families. These tents were set up by kibbutzim from the western Negev, families of victims of the Nova music festival massacre, the Bnei Akiva movement, and the Wolfson Foundation's "Ayelet Hashachar" organization.

The square hosts kiosks selling merchandise with the "Bring Them Home Now" logo, tents for gatherings and discussions, and small stages for speeches. Some tents are staffed by representatives and survivors from the attacked kibbutzim, who speak with visitors and display posters of their kidnapped members. An electronic screen was installed that counts the time elapsed since the October 7 attacks. After the remains of Ran Gvili, the last hostage held in Gaza, were recovered on 26 January 2026, a ceremony was held and the counter was stopped at 843 days.

The CEO of the Tel Aviv Museum has described the square as a "direct and open line between the general public and the museum," citing the connection between the art installations in the plaza and the exhibits inside.

=== Art installations ===
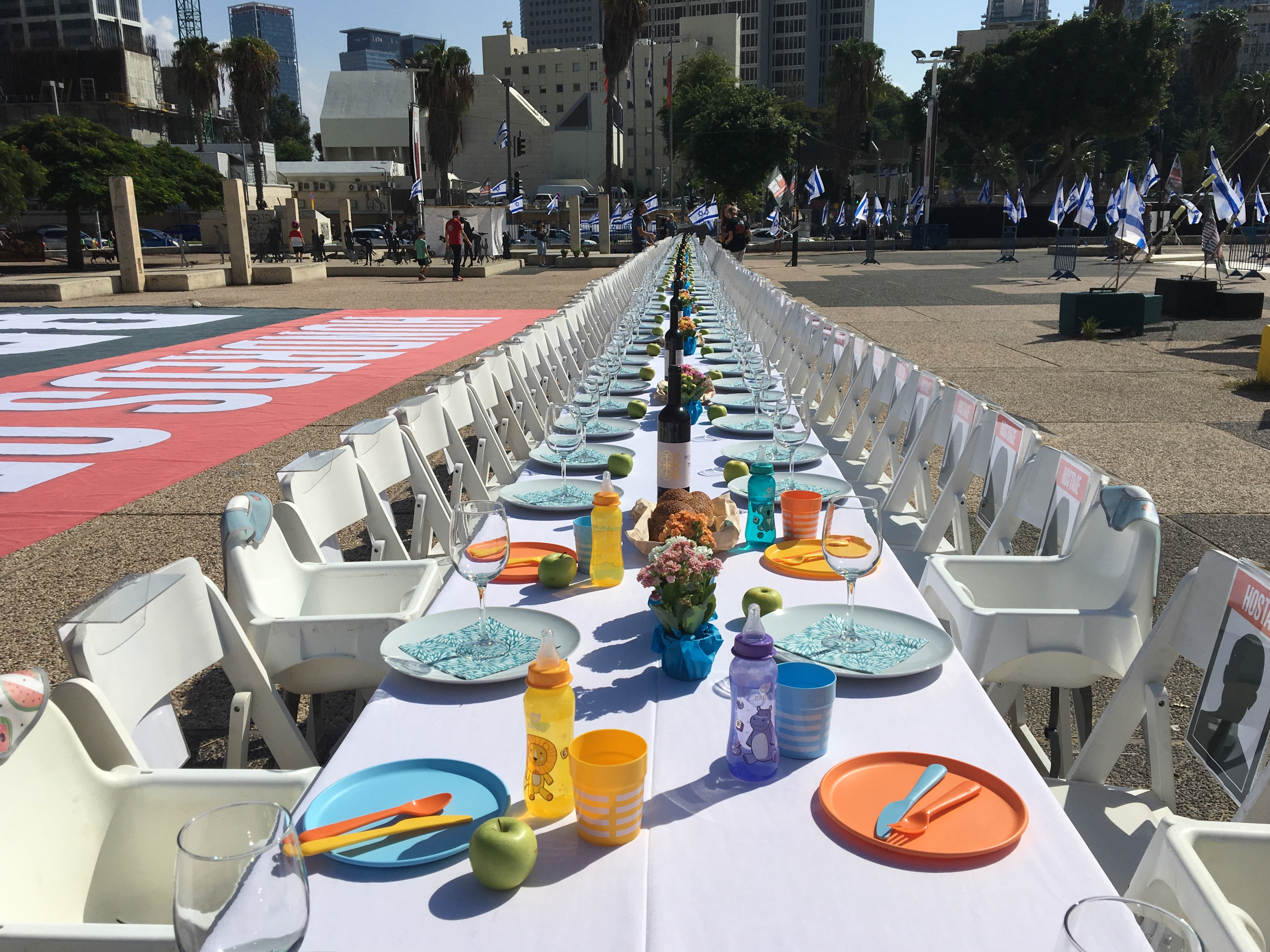
A long table set up for a Shabbat dinner to visualize the number of hostages held in the Gaza Strip

The square features art installations and banners highlighting the hostages' plight and calling for their release.

One of the first pieces installed was an empty Shabbat dinner table, with an empty seat for each hostage. Other works include the Empty Yellow Chairs installation, where the color yellow signifies solidarity. Mirrors were also installed around a pre-war sculpture, The Binding of Isaac by Menashe Kadishman.

Some pieces were repurposed for the square, such as a large metal and wood female face sculpture by Nitzan Peled and Gidi Galor. The incomplete work survived the Be'eri massacre and was moved to Arugot for completion before its installation.

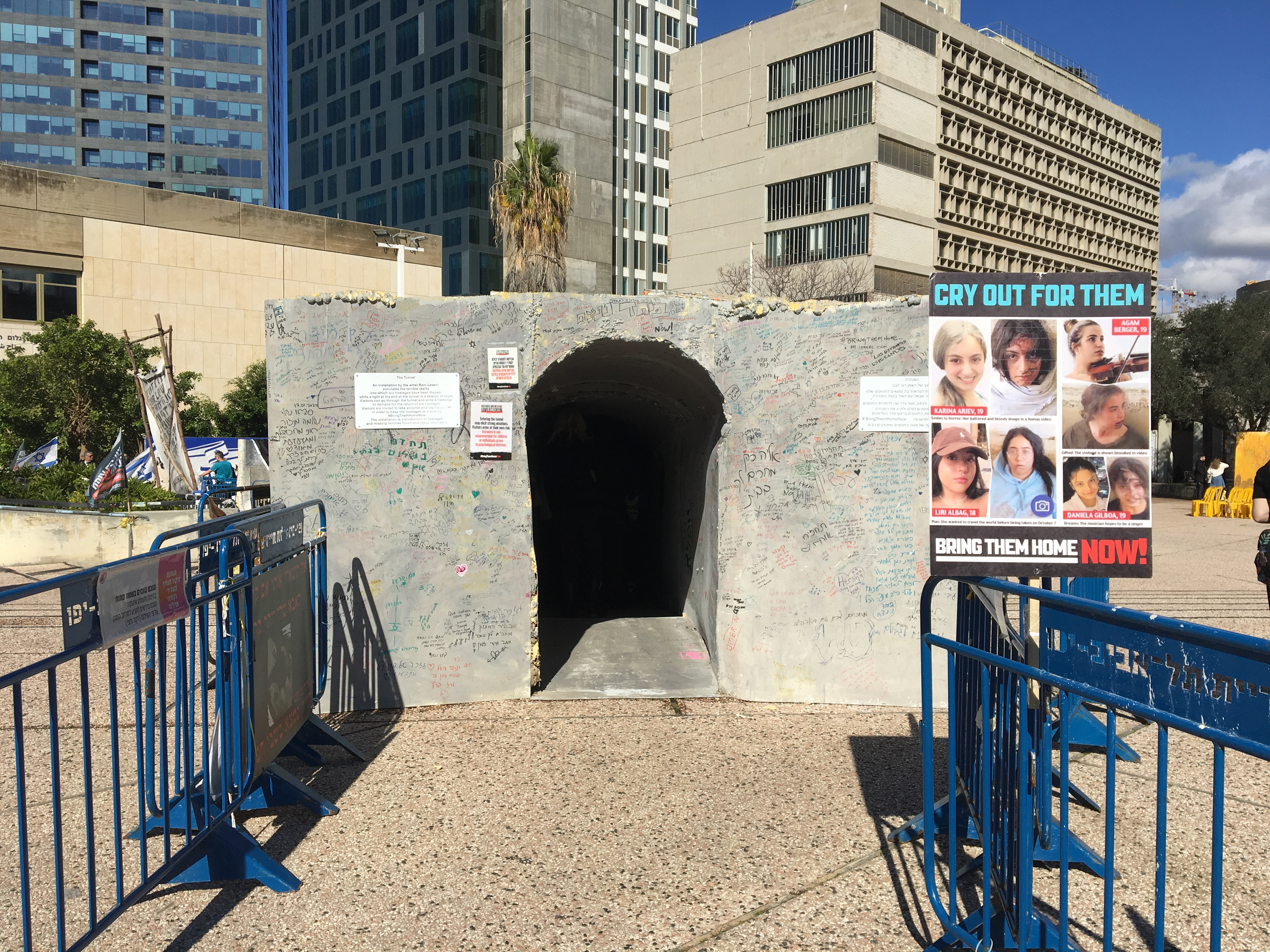
Entrance of the Kidnapped Tunnel performance art piece by Roni Levavi, created in collaboration with the Hostages and Missing Families Forum

In January 2024, a 25-meter mock Hamas tunnel was erected. This narrow, dimly lit passage allows attendees to walk through while loudspeakers play the names of the hostages, messages from their families, and sounds of distant gunfire to simulate the conditions of captivity.

A "Tree of Wishes" was installed with tags decorated by Jewish schoolchildren from 650 schools worldwide, a project connected to the UnitEd program of the Israeli Ministry of Diaspora Affairs and Combating Antisemitism.

In September 2025, to mark the 700th day of captivity, protesters displayed a large yellow SOS sign with an hourglass, symbolizing that time was running out. Attendees wore yellow and were led in a Friday evening prayer service by representatives from Gaza-border communities, hostage families, and released hostages.

=== Rallies ===
==== 2023 ====
On 12 November 2023, Arab-Israeli newscaster Lucy Aharish led a rally of over 1,000 women in Hostages Square, calling for the release of the more than 100 women held hostage and condemning the sexual violence committed on October 7. Speakers, including Cochav Elkayam-Levy, model Linor Abargil, newscaster Linoy Bar-Geffen, athlete Yarden Gerbi, and singer Rita, also criticized the silence of international women's organizations on the issue.

On 24 November, a large Shabbat service was held at the square following that day's hostage release. Attendees included cabinet minister Benny Gantz. The next day, approximately 100,000 people rallied to mark "50 Days of Hell" since the hostage-taking.

In early December 2023, thousands gathered to demand the return of the remaining hostages. Speakers included recently freed hostages who had been released during the late-November temporary ceasefire and prisoner exchange.

==== 2024 ====
The square has been the site of weekly rallies held by the Hostages and Missing Families Forum since the hostages were taken, with anti-governmental protests also being held nearby since early 2024.

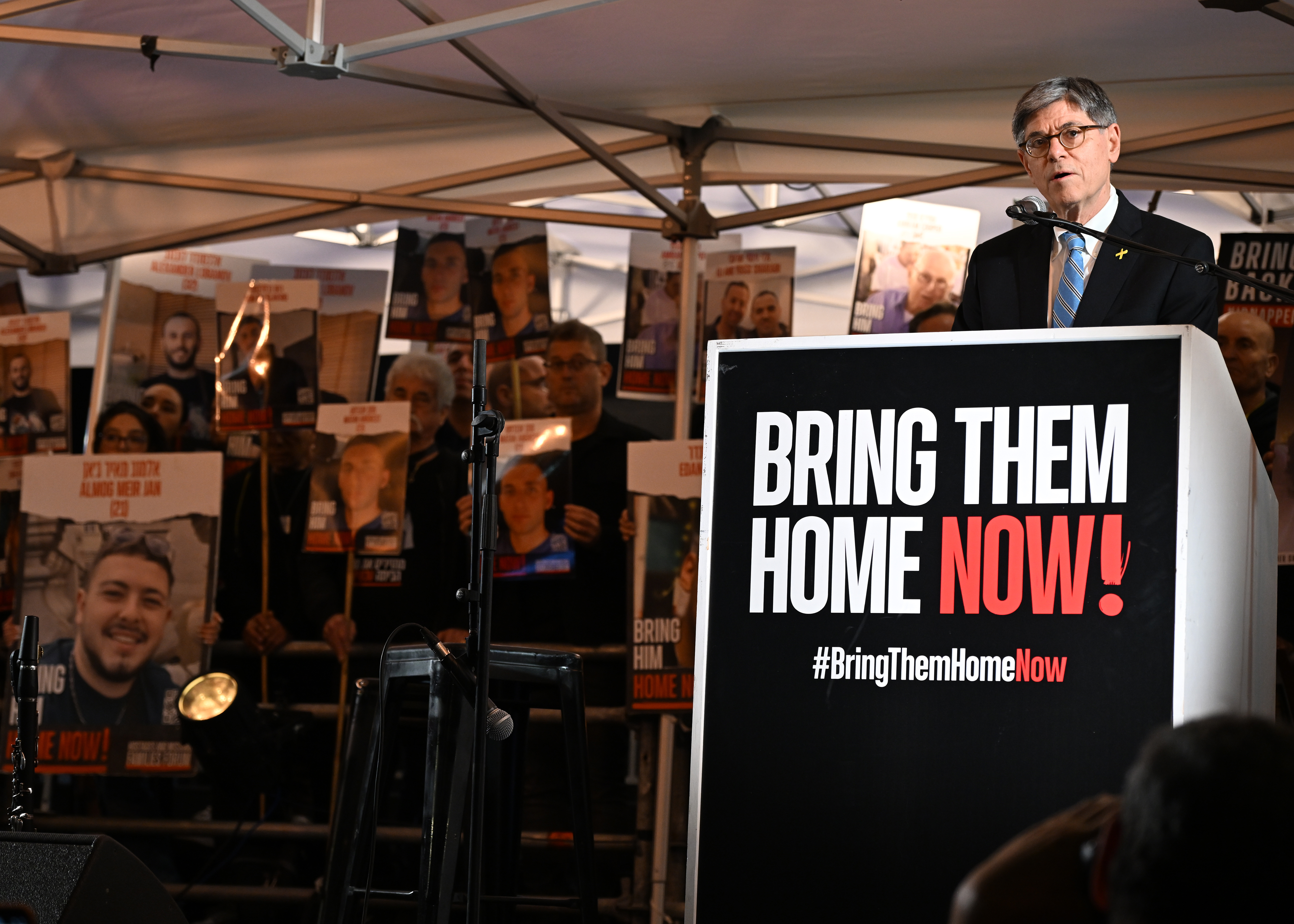
Ambassador Jack Lew Speaks at the 100 Days Memorial for hostages at Hostage Square in Tel Aviv in January 2024

On the evening of 13 January 2024, an estimated 120,000 people attended the start of a 24-hour rally to mark 100 days since the attacks. Speakers included relatives of the hostages, French President Emmanuel Macron, US Ambassador to Israel Jack Lew, former Supreme Court President Dorit Beinisch, Nobel laureate Aaron Ciechanover, and Rabbi Yisrael Meir Lau. Family members warned that time was running out and expressed frustration with the government's efforts. Despite heavy rain, fifty artists performed and spoke in support of the hostages, including Sarit Hadad, Itay Levi, Ran Danker, Ehud Banai, Jasmin Moallem, Elai Botner, Zehava Ben, and Amir Dadon.

On 23 March, a reading of the Book of Esther for Purim was held, led by the Tzohar Rabbinical Organization and Rabbi Kenneth Brander of Ohr Torah Stone. Shay Gabso also performed.

On 30 March, after a rally in the square, family members of hostages marched towards the Kirya, joined by anti-government protesters from the Kaplan protest. Israeli police declared the march illegal, and the event reportedly turned violent, with family members' microphones being cut off at the Begin Bridge.

==== 2025 ====
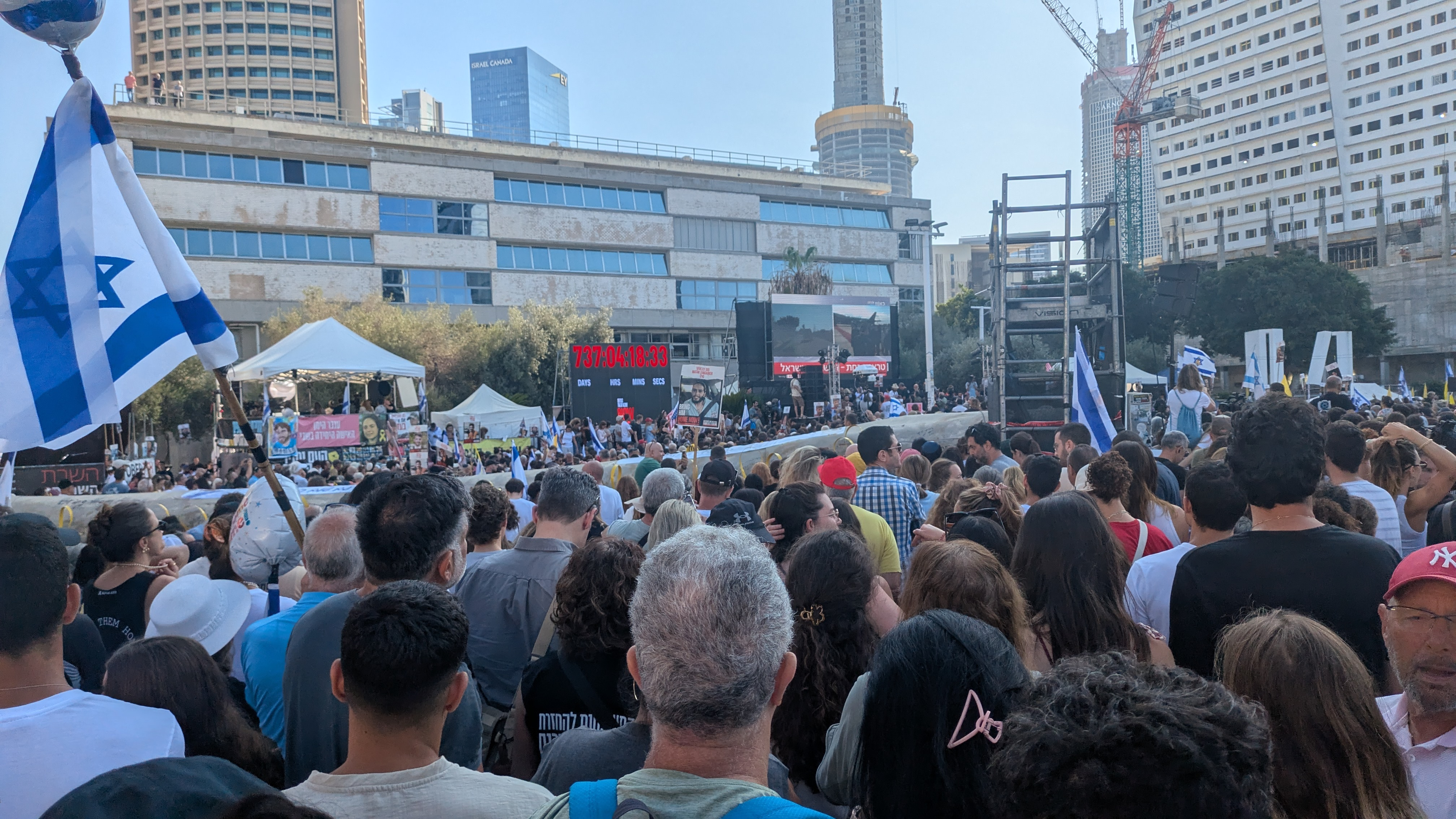
Thousands of Israelis gathered at the square on 13 October 2025 to watch a split screen on a jumbotron of Trump visiting Israel and the release of hostages

In January 2025, the square was used to stream live transmissions of hostages being released to the IDF during the 2025 ceasefire and prisoner exchange. Pictures of the released individuals were displayed throughout the square. During the first release, roughly 2,000 people watched the events on large screens, releasing yellow balloons into the air once the hostages were confirmed to be back in Israel.

On 30 January, US Special Envoy to the Middle East Steve Witkoff visited the square, meeting with released hostages and family members of those still in captivity.

On 10 February, an event was held to commemorate the 24th birthday of Alon Ohel, his second in captivity. His family called for his release, and singer Ivri Lider performed for them.

On 28 May, thousands gathered to mark 600 days of war and hostage crisis. The rally featured speeches from actor Lior Ashkenazi, testimony from released hostages, and appeals from families of those still held.

On 31 May, during the holiday of Shavuot, rallies were held nationwide to demand a ceasefire and hostage deal, coinciding with US diplomatic efforts. A rally at the square, hosted by the Hostages and Missing Families Forum, featured speeches from former hostages and families of the remaining captives.

On 13 October 2025, thousands of Israelis gathered at Hostages Square in celebration as the last 20 living hostages were released back into Israel following the implementation of the Gaza peace plan.

==== 2026 ====
On 27 January 2026, following the return of the last hostage body and the end of the Gaza war hostage crisis, the hostages clock at the square stopped counting, with the final count being 843 days.

In August 2026, the Tel Aviv municipality officially renamed the plaza Hostages Square. Until then, the name had been commonly used but was unofficial. The municipality stated that the name change "is meant to ensure that this chapter in Israel’s history — from October 7, 2023, until the return of the last hostage, Ran Gvili, on January 26, 2026 — will be remembered for generations."

== Gallery ==
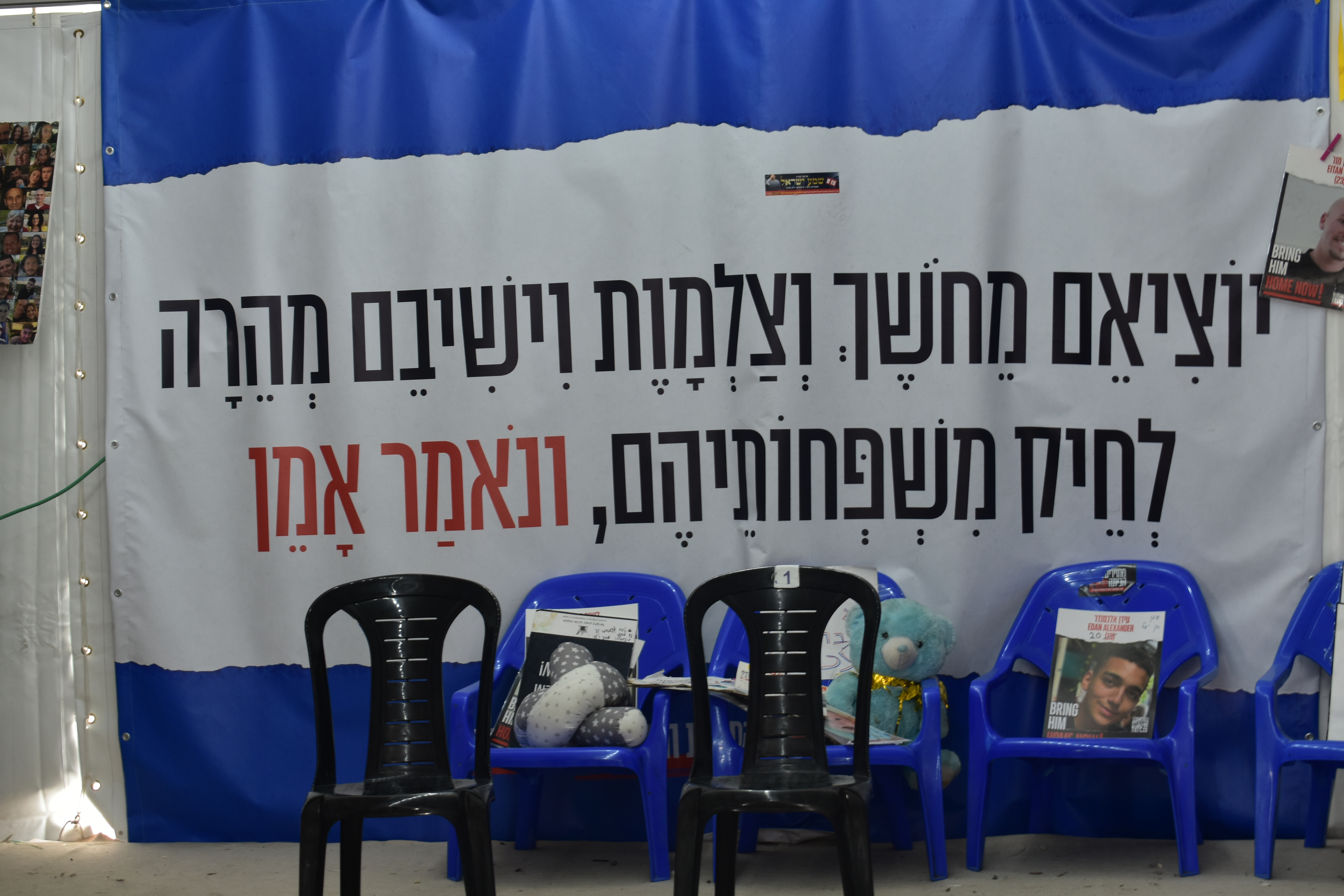
A banner displaying a prayer for the return of captives (Note: The first 3 words on the banner (top row, from the right) are the first 3 words of Psalm 107:14. The four other words in black roughtly translate as "and return them to their families as quickly as possible". The text in red says "and we shall say, 'Amen'")

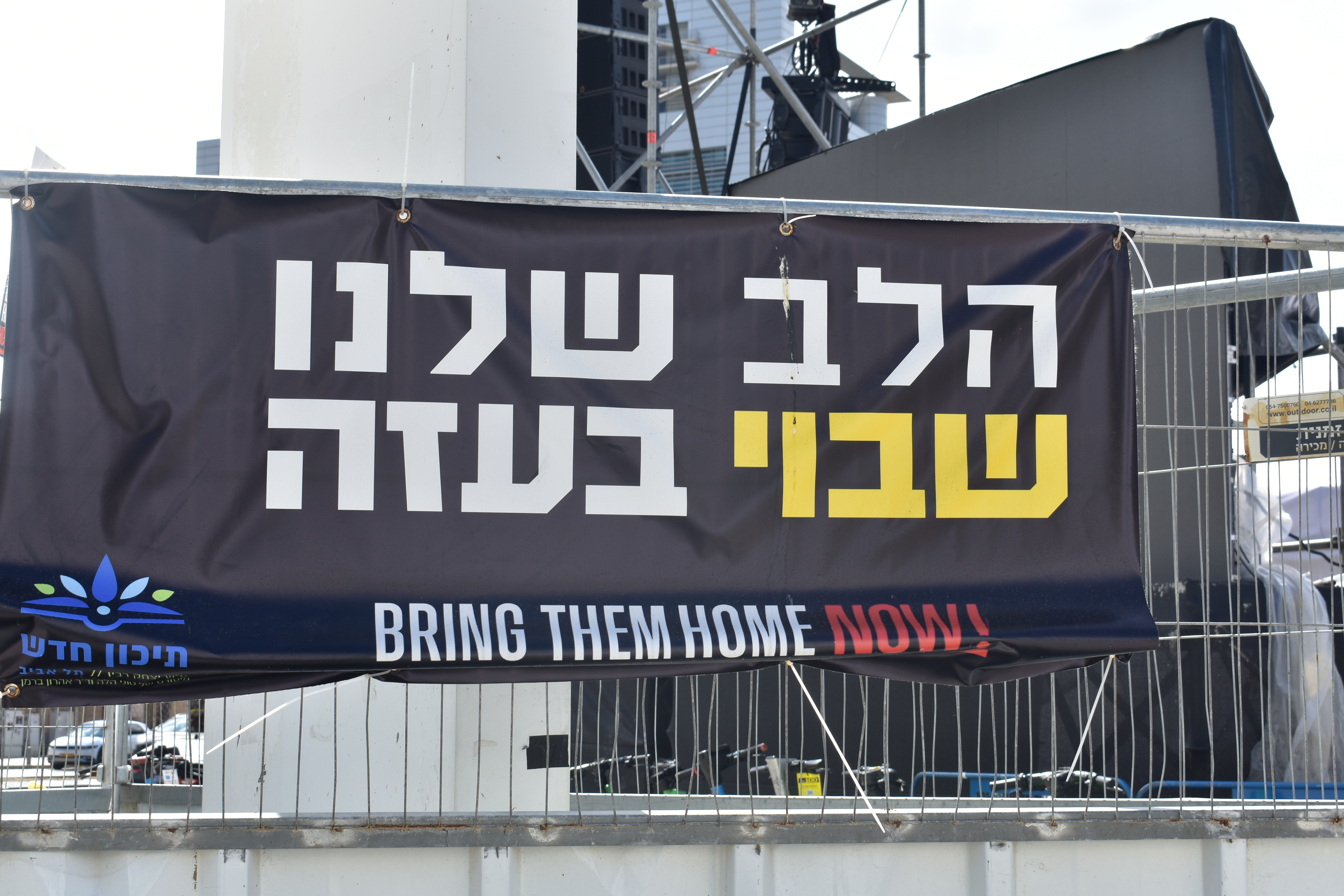
"Our [collective] heart is being held captive in Gaza"

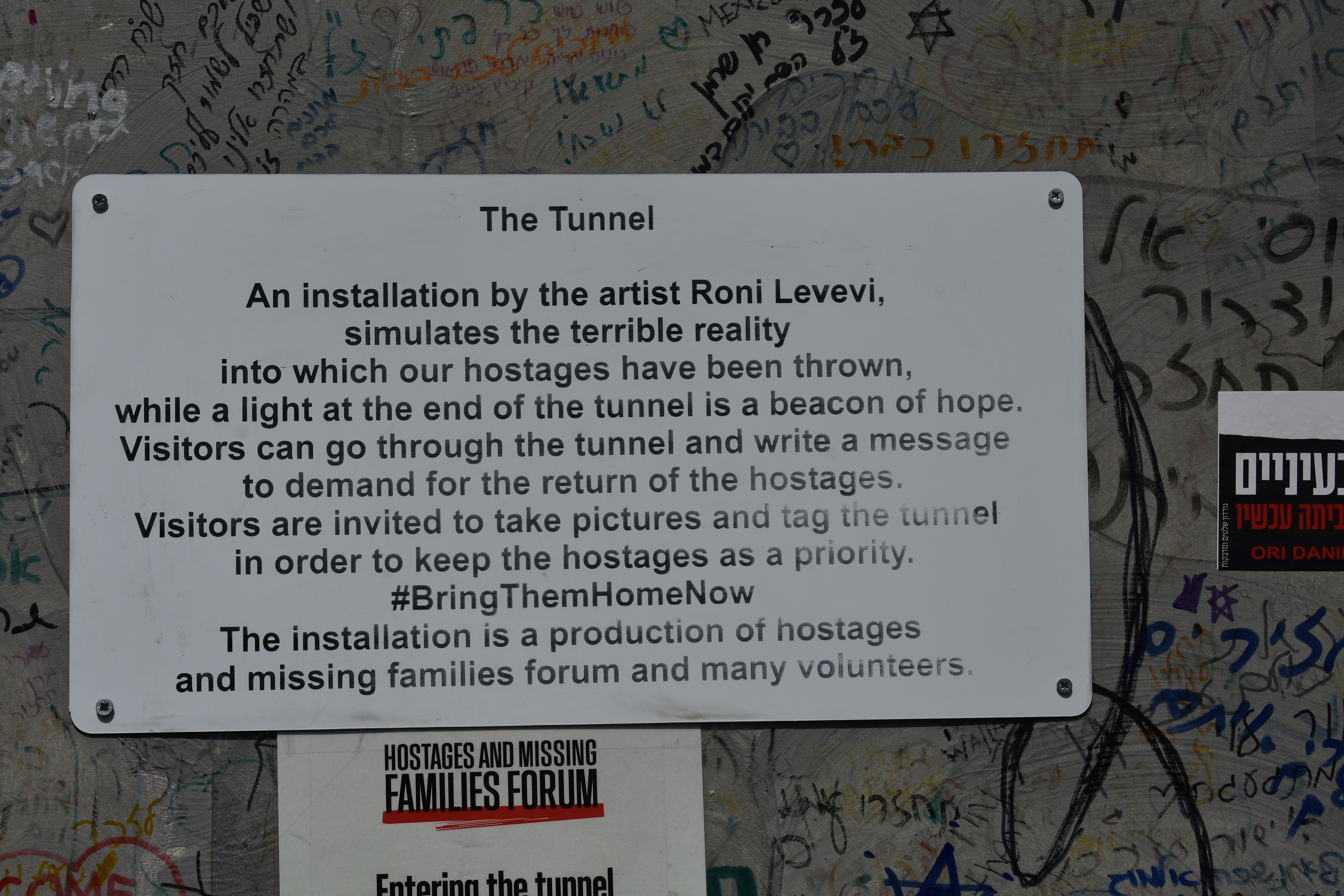
Explanation of "The Tunnel" in Hostages Square

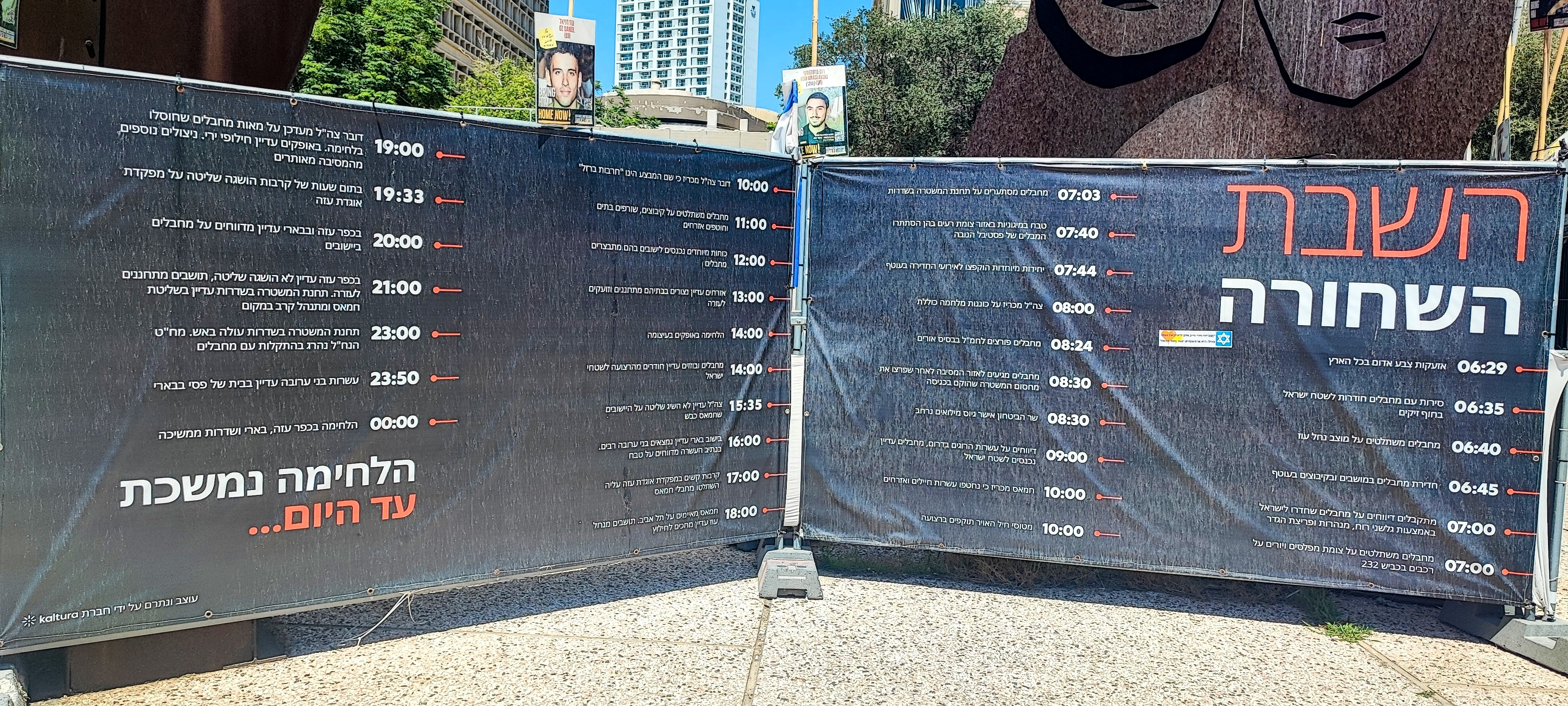
A banner commemorating the victims of the October 7 attacks and hostages taken during the attacks with a timeline of events of the day

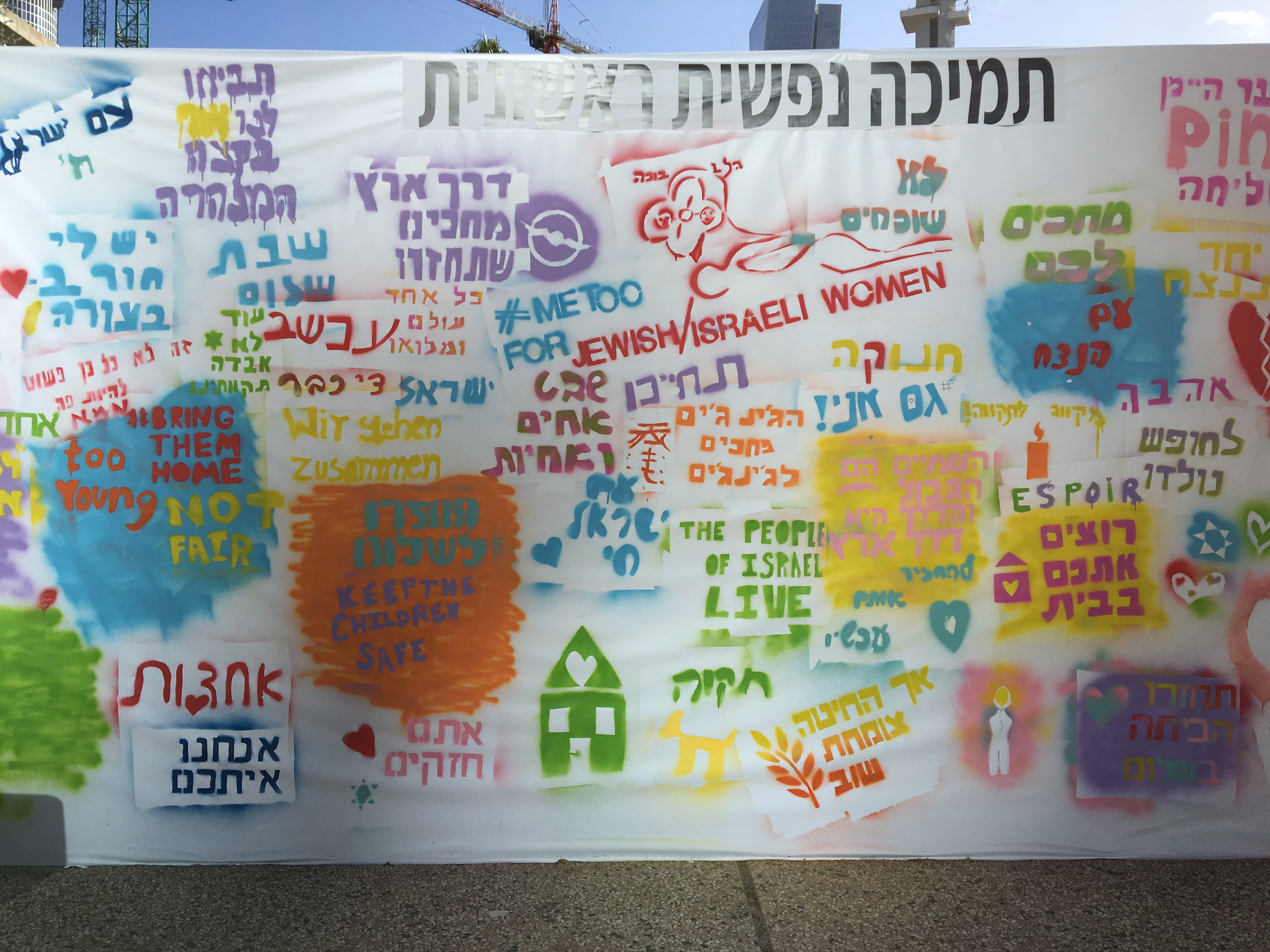
Emotional support board

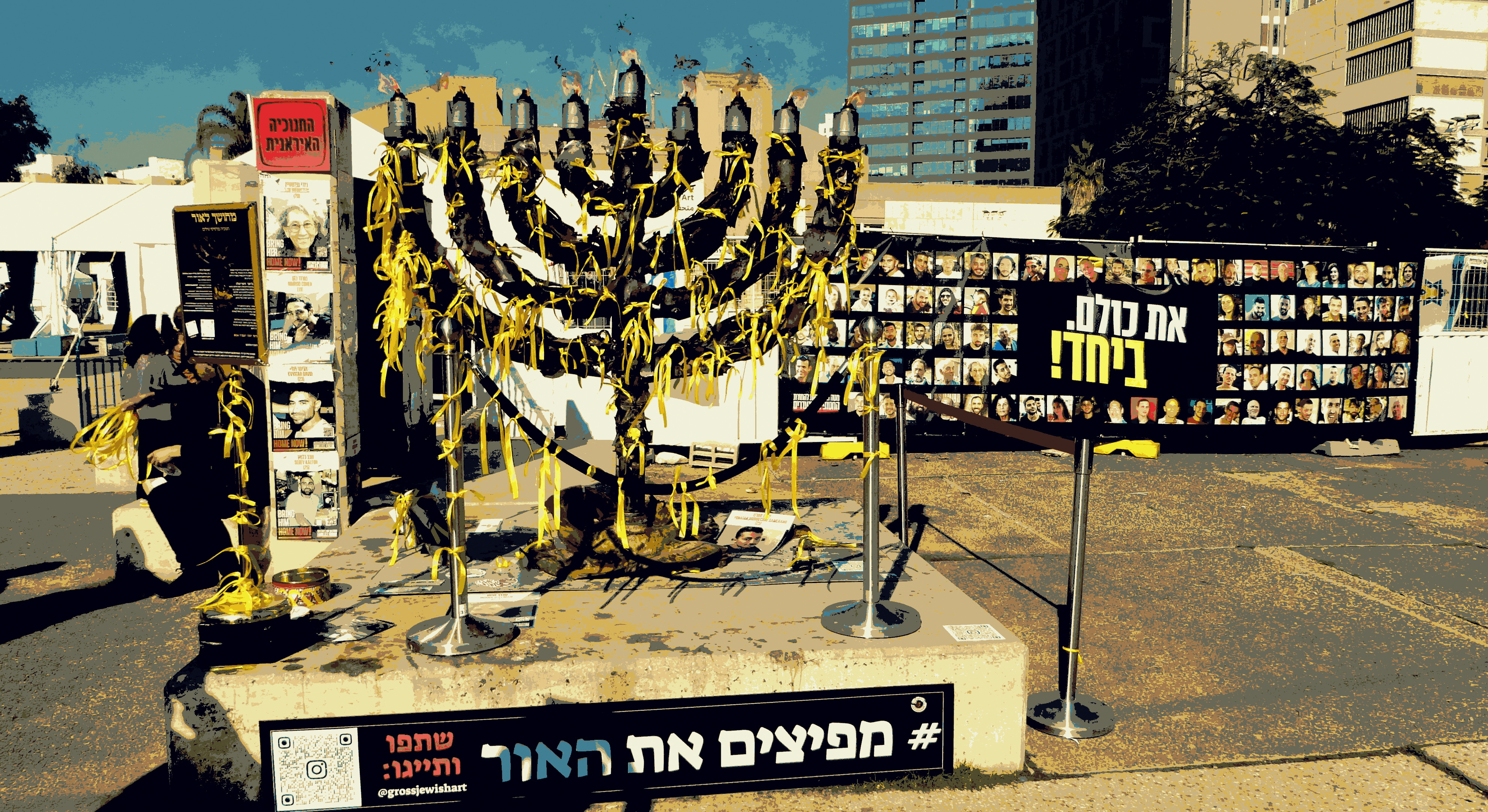
A menorah memorial

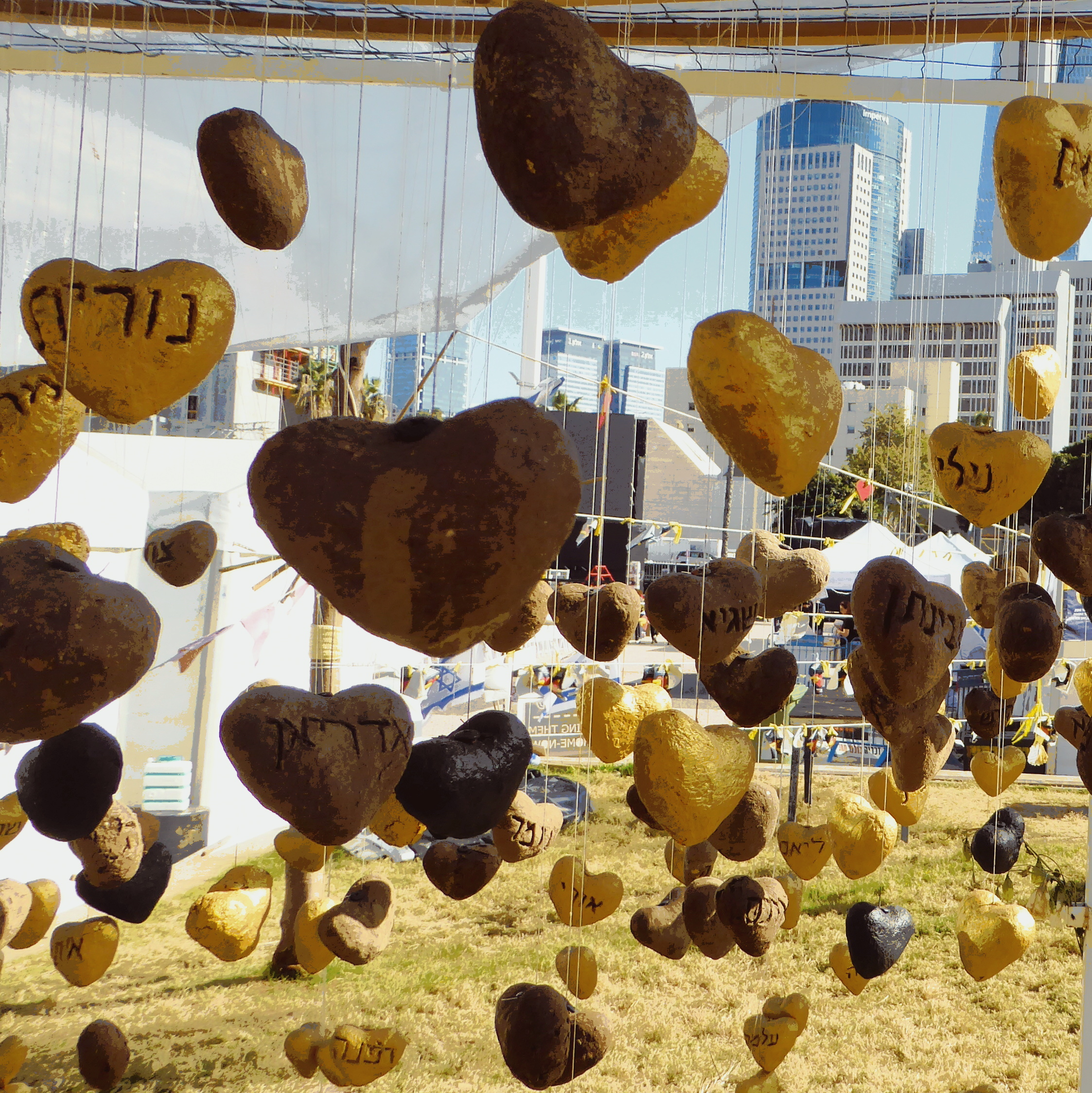
Heart-shaped rocks to commemorate the hostages

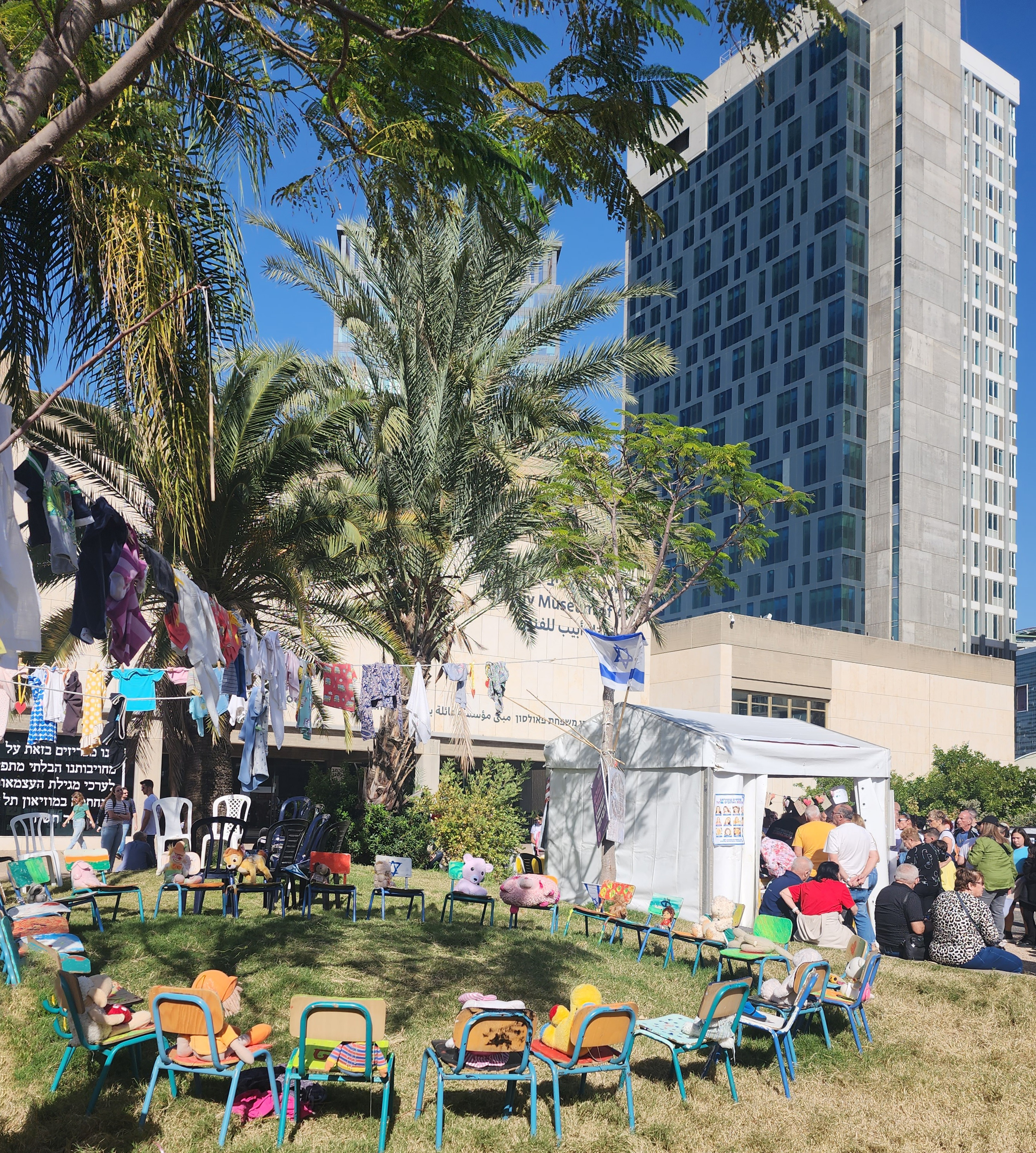
Commemoration of hostage children

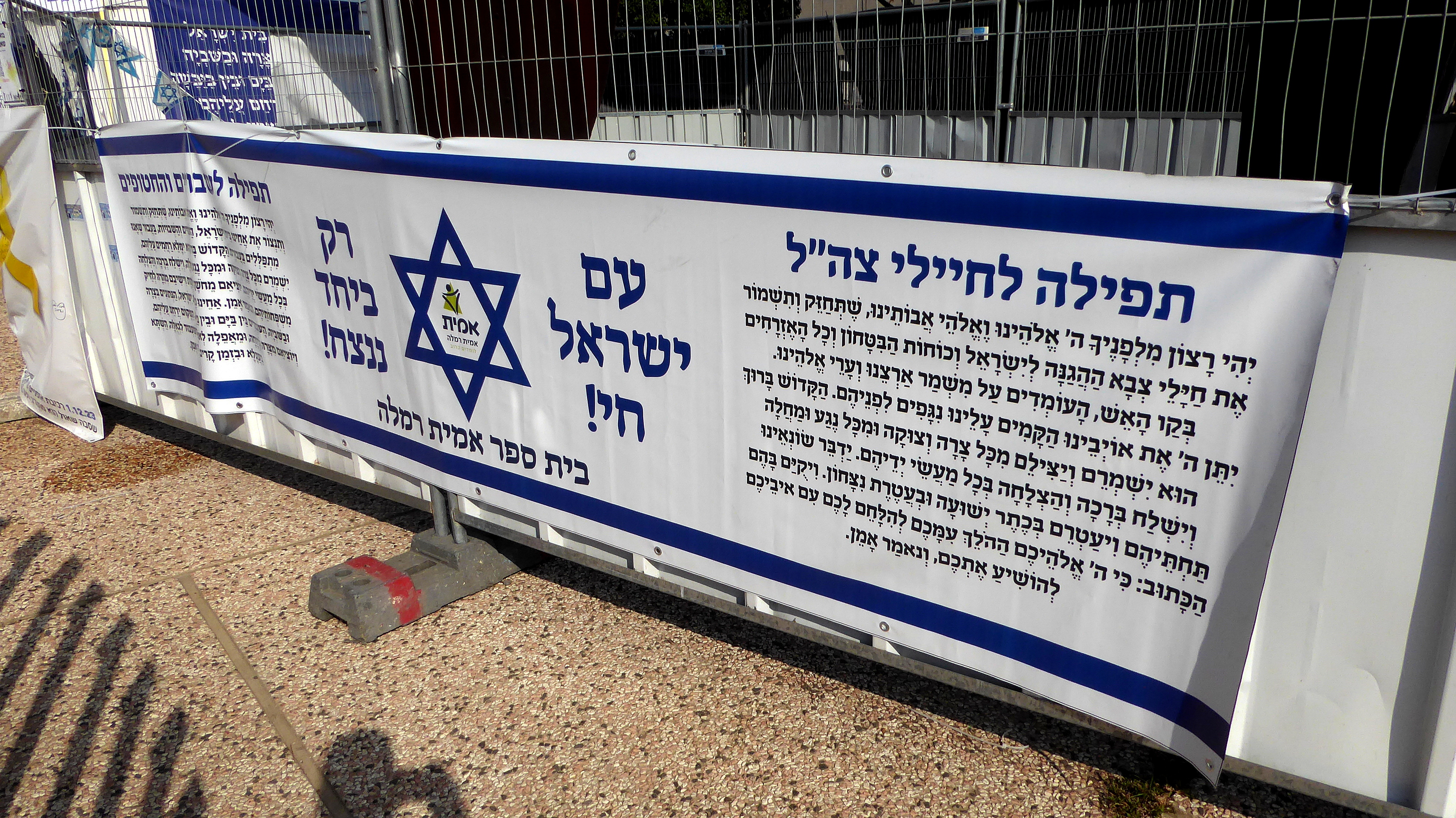
"Am Yisrael Chai!"

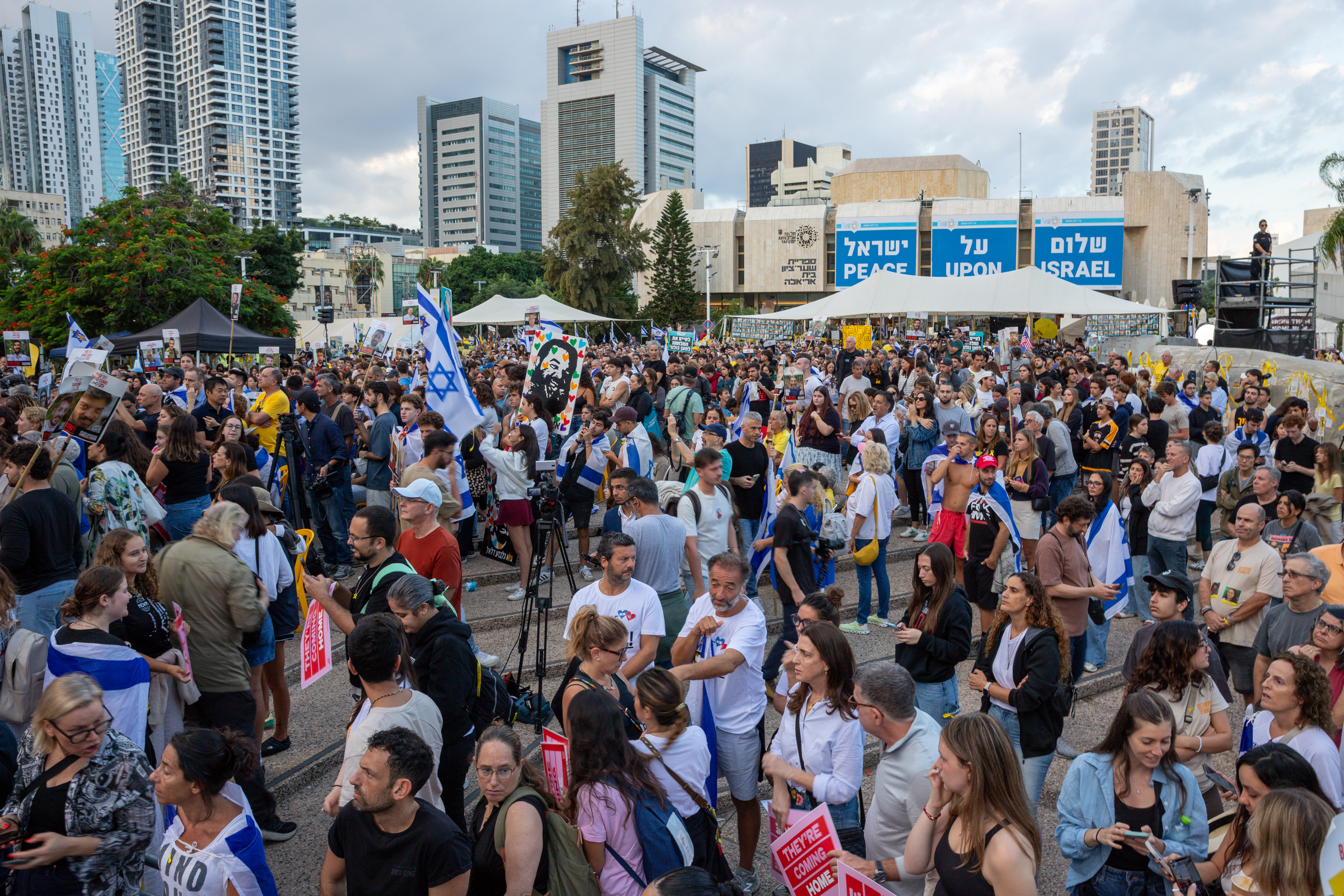
Crowds gather in celebration as the last living hostages are released
