= Gaza war hostage crisis =

Hostages taken into Gaza (2023–2026)

- Part of the Gaza war
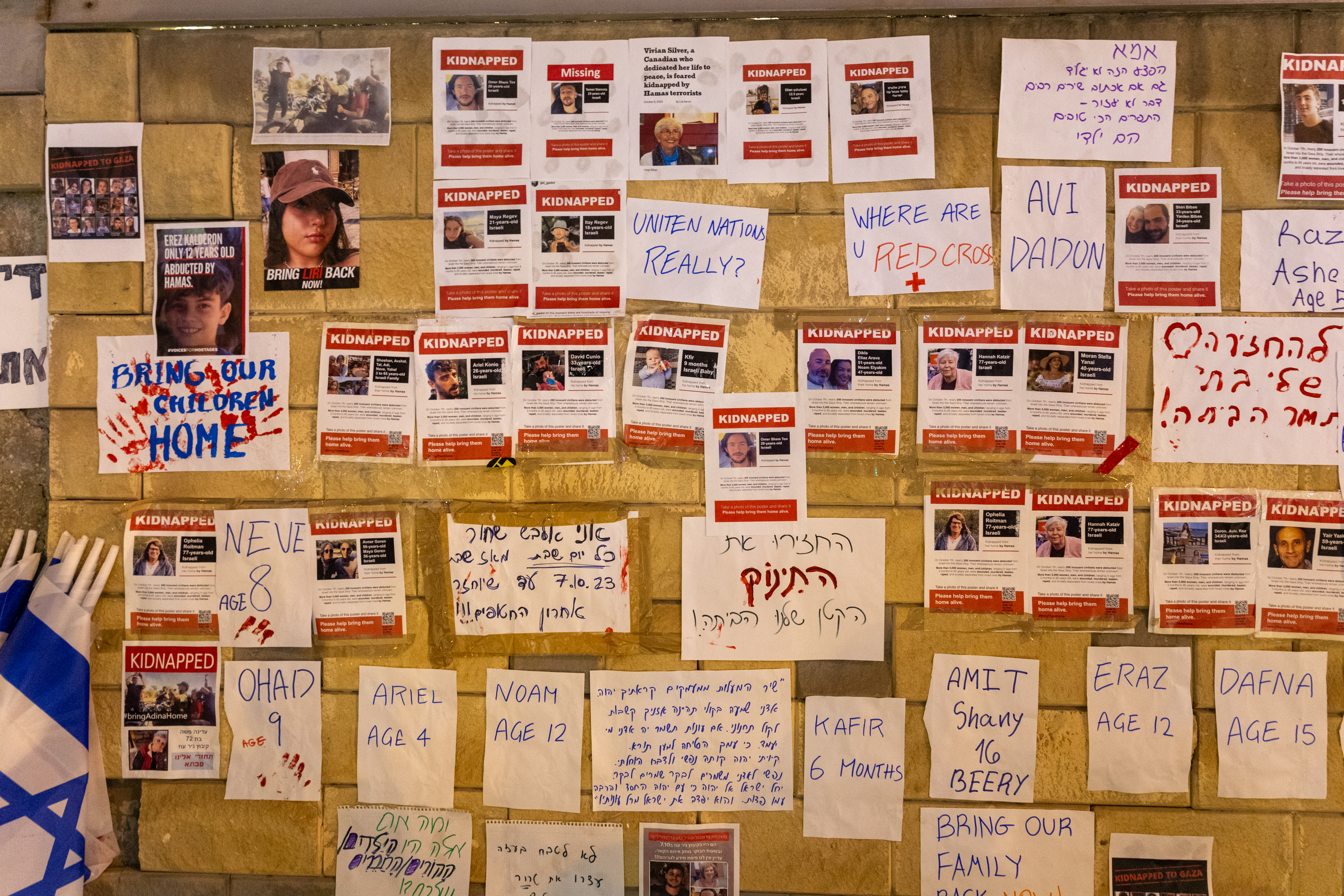
- Kidnapped posters in Tel Aviv calling for the return of Israeli hostages in Gaza
Date	7 October 2023 – 26 January 2026 (Note: All living captives were released by 13 October 2025. The remains of the last remaining captive were recovered on 26 January 2026.) (2 years, 3 months, 2 weeks and 5 days)
Location	Gaza Strip and Israel; some Palestinian prisoners were released to the West Bank and East Jerusalem in the first ceasefire deal
Result	251 hostages kidnapped to Gaza, (Note: Excludes four hostages held in Gaza prior to the 7 October attacks, and 17 additional hostages held inside Israel on the day of the attack.) 85 of whom were killed

Belligerents
Involved in negotiations: Hamas; Palestinian Islamic Jihad	Citizens held hostage Israel; Thailand; Nepal; Philippines; Tanzania Additional nationalities: (Note: Many Israeli citizens taken hostage had citizenship from additional countries.): Argentina; Germany; United States; Russia; France; Poland; Hungary; United Kingdom; Austria; Bulgaria; Romania; Canada; Denmark; Netherlands; South Africa; Mexico; Italy; Serbia; Colombia; Ethiopia; Portugal; Ukraine; Brazil; Uruguay; Ireland; Spain

Commanders and leaders
(Hamas) Yahya Sinwar †; In negotiations (Hamas) Ismail Haniyeh X (Hamas) Khalil al-Hayya (Hamas) Basem Naim (Hamas) Osama Hamdan	(Israel) Benjamin Netanyahu; In negotiations (Israel) Ron Dermer (Israel) David Barnea (Israel) Ronen Bar (Israel) Nitzan Alon

Units involved
Holding hostages: (Hamas) Al-Qassam Brigades; Al-Quds Brigades; Abu Ali Mustafa Brigades; Al-Nasser Salah al-Deen Brigades; Mujahideen Brigades	Israel Defense Forces; YAMAM; Shin Bet

In the wake of the October 7 attacks that sparked the Gaza war, Hamas and other Palestinian militant groups abducted 251 people from Israel to the Gaza Strip, including children, women, and elderly people. Almost half of the hostages were foreign nationals or had multiple citizenships, and some hostages were Negev Bedouins. The hostages were held in different locations in the Gaza Strip.

168 hostages were returned alive to Israel, with 105 released in the 2023 Gaza war ceasefire, five released by Hamas outside the framework of any ceasefire agreement, eight rescued by the Israel Defense Forces (IDF), 30 released during the January 2025 Gaza war ceasefire. The 20 remaining living hostages were released as part of the Gaza peace plan on 13 October 2025.

The bodies of 85 hostages were repatriated to Israel, who were killed on 7 October 2023 or in Hamas captivity. (Note: Excludes Oron Shaul and Hadar Goldin, whose bodies were captured prior to the war; Shaul's body was recovered during the war and Goldin's under the Gaza peace plan.) Three had escaped captivity, and were killed in a friendly fire incident by IDF troops. An additional 48 hostages were recovered in military operations, 8 were returned in the January 2025 ceasefire deal, and 27 during the Gaza peace plan. The body of the last hostage, Ran Gvili, was recovered by Israeli forces from a cemetery in northern Gaza on 26 January 2026.

The return of the hostages was a goal of the Israeli operation in Gaza. Its status as the main goal has been debated by Israeli politicians.

Hamas offered to release all hostages in exchange for Israel releasing all 5,200 Palestinian prisoners at the start of the war. Several countries have been involved in negotiations between Israel and Hamas, with Qatar taking the lead.

Israel and Hamas agreed on 22 November 2023 to a four-day ceasefire and the release of 50 women and children held hostage in exchange for 150 Palestinian prisoners held by Israel. By the last day of the ceasefire on 30 November 2023, 105 civilian hostages had been released, including 81 people from Israel, 23 Thais and one Filipino. Two Argentinian-Israeli civilians were rescued in Operation Golden Hand on 12 February 2024, during which 94–100+ Palestinians were killed. Hamas insinuated on 2 September 2024 that it would kill any hostage that the IDF attempted to rescue with military force, so that Israel could only receive the hostages back by negotiating an exchange of Palestinian prisoners. It was announced on 15 January 2025 that Hamas would release 33 out of 98 hostages in a first phase that included infants, children, women, elderly men, and younger men with injuries or health issues. Israel released more than 1,000 Palestinians being held in Israeli prisons in exchange.

== Background ==
The issue of hostages and prisoners is considered emotional for both Israelis and Palestinians. Since 1967, between 750,000 and 1 million Palestinians have been arrested by Israel. As of October 2023, Israel held 5,200 Palestinian prisoners, including 170 children. (By November 2023, the number of Palestinian prisoners, including suspected militants and Gazans had increased to 10,000.) Some have been convicted on terrorism-related charges. UN Special Rapporteur Francesca Albanese described many convictions as resulting from "a litany of violations of international law, including due process violations, that taint the legitimacy of the administration of justice by the occupying power." About 1,310 Palestinians are held in administrative detention, a practice that allows Israel to detain Palestinians indefinitely without charges or trial. Israel justifies this practice citing security reasons.

Hamas has used hostages as bargaining chips for prisoner exchanges, which is a violation of international law. Hostage-taking and the abduction of civilians are prohibited by international law and are war crimes. Israel had mostly refrained from negotiating with organizations it deemed as terrorists, opting for military or alternative measures to secure the release of hostages. However, Israel has engaged in prisoner exchanges with armed groups on several occasions.

Notable incidents include the 1994 abduction of Israeli soldier Nachshon Wachsman by Hamas, resulting in his death during a failed rescue attempt by Israel Defense Forces. Hamas actions were at times aimed at disrupting the peace process in the 1990s. In 2006, Israeli soldier Gilad Shalit was captured and held for over five years until a prisoner exchange in 2011. Israel secured his release in exchange for 1,000 Palestinians, some of whom were tried as terrorists.

The 2014 kidnapping and murder of three Israeli teenagers, Eyal Yifrach, Naftali Fraenkel, and Gilad Shaar, heightened tensions and contributed to opening of the 2014 Gaza War (Operation Protective Edge). Hamas had also held the bodies of two slain Israeli soldiers, Hadar Goldin and Oron Shaul, since Operation Protective Edge in 2014. Additionally, at the time of its attack, Hamas was already holding two Israelis hostage: Ethiopian Israeli Avera Mengistu (since 2014) and Bedouin Israeli Hisham al-Sayed (since 2015), both released in February 2025. On 31 August 2023, Israel warned its citizens that Hamas was trying to kidnap them.

On 7 October 2023, Palestinian militant groups led by Hamas launched an attack on Israel, initiating the current Gaza war. The attack resulted in thousands of Israeli and legal resident casualties, leading to widespread condemnation and accusations of war crimes. The use of hostages, primarily women, children, and the elderly, is highlighted as a violation by Hamas of international humanitarian law.

== 7 October attacks ==
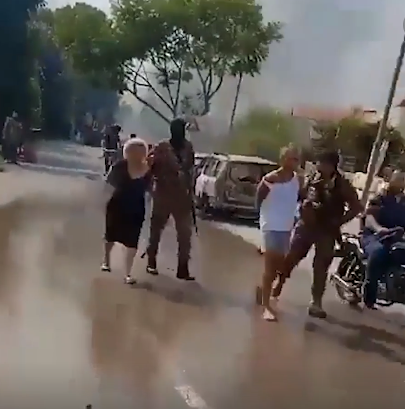
Hamas gunmen with civilian hostages from Kibbutz Be'eri

On the morning of 7 October 2023, around 6:30 a.m. IST, around 6,000 Palestinians including 3,800 from the Hamas "elite Nukhba forces" launched an attack into Israel from 119 sites on its border with the Gaza Strip. The operation included attacks on Israel Defense Forces (IDF) bases as well as massacres of Israeli civilians. The ground incursion was combined with a sustained barrage of at least 4,300 rockets.

At around 7:00 am, militants raided many communities and kibbutzim (intentional communities) in the Gaza periphery area of Israel. They killed 1,200 civilians and soldiers. The Economist described the combined attacks as "the biggest terror attack in [Israel's] history".

In the initial wave of attacks, civilians were kidnapped and forcibly dragged back to Gaza as captives. According to Hamas and Palestinian Islamic Jihad, around 200 soldiers and civilians were captured or abducted during the raid on the Gaza periphery communities. Rear Admiral Daniel Hagari, an IDF spokesperson, reported on 7 October that military officers were among those captured. Israel confirmed the identity of 203 captives, among them 30 children, while Gaza spokespeople reported holding roughly 200, estimating that another 50 were held by other factions. The IDF reported that it captured Hamas manuals instructing fighters to kill difficult captives and use the rest as human shields. The UN's Pramila Patten and Commission of Inquiry was unable to substantiate these claims.

Civilians held captive in Gaza included families, children, guest workers, and elderly adults. One was 75-year-old historian Alex Dancyg who wrote books on Poland's Jewish community and the Holocaust, and the Bibas family were taken from their home, including a 6-month old and 4-year-old from Nir Oz.

While many hostages had only Israeli citizenship, about half of the hostages are foreign nationals or have multiple citizenships. Some hold citizenship from France, Germany, Russia, United Kingdom, and the United States. At least seventeen Thai citizens working in greenhouses in the Gaza periphery were also kidnapped. Bipin Joshi of Nepal was abducted from kibbutz Alumim, and his body was identified among those returned in October 2025. One Filipino was abducted and subsequently released during the 2023 Gaza war ceasefire. Hamas also took members of the Negev Bedouin Arab community as hostages.

=== Hostages held inside Israel ===
There were two hostage standoff situations inside Israel on the day of the October 7 attacks: one in Ofakim at the home of Rachel Edry, and one in Be'eri at the home of Pessi Cohen. At a third scene, the Sderot police station, police officers and civilians escaped to the building's roof, where they were rescued without incident. The Hamas militants remained holed up in the station until they were neutralized.

The hostage takers at Pessi Cohen's home in Be'eri demanded safe passage to Gaza for themselves and their hostages. The hostages numbers listed in the rest of the article do not include the 17 hostages held inside Israel. Only four of the 17 hostages held inside Israel survived.

=== Media documentation ===
There is a video depicting at least 64 of the abductees. Video analysis from The Washington Post shows that some of the captives were killed shortly after their capture. Images taken by the Associated Press also showed Yaffa Adar being kidnapped.

On 19 November 2023, the Israeli military released reported CCTV footage that they claimed showed hostages being led into Al-Shifa Hospital on 7 October. This was in the wake of Israel being put under pressure to substantiate claims that Hamas was operating an expansive command center under the hospital leading to its siege. BBC News said that they were unable to verify the video.

== Aftermath ==
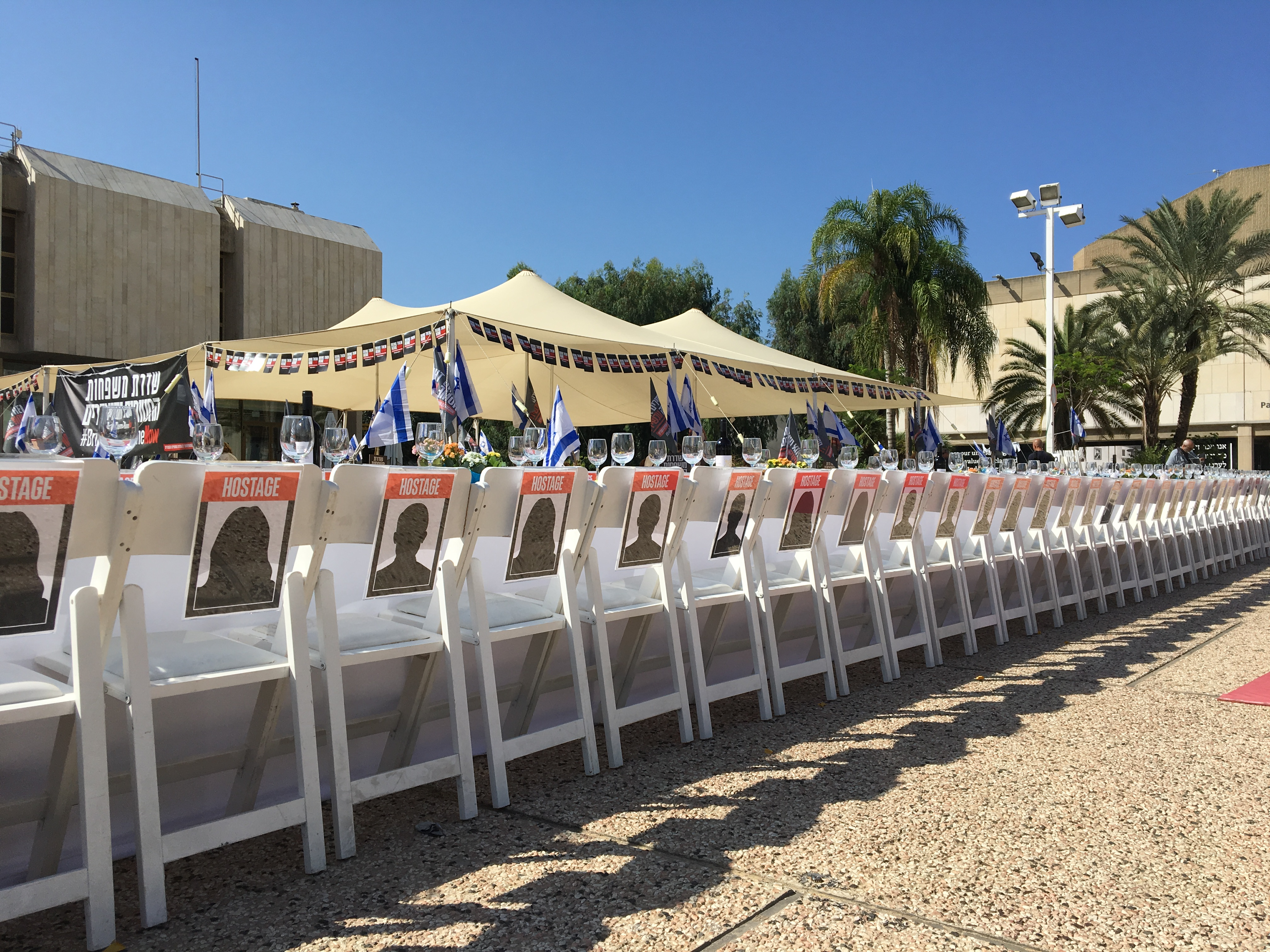
A "Shabbat Dinner" table at the Tel Aviv art museum plaza, with more than 200 empty seats, representing the hostages and missing held in Gaza

As part of Israel's counteroffensive, Israel implemented a "total blockade" of the Gaza Strip until the hostages have been released. Amnesty International describes this measure as having been "taken to punish civilians in Gaza for the actions of Palestinian armed groups," amounting to collective punishment. Israel has also undertaken mass detentions of Palestinians in Israel and the Palestinian territories; several Israeli NGOs described the detention of several thousand Gazan workers as a form of retaliation or "vengeance" for the capture of Israeli citizens.

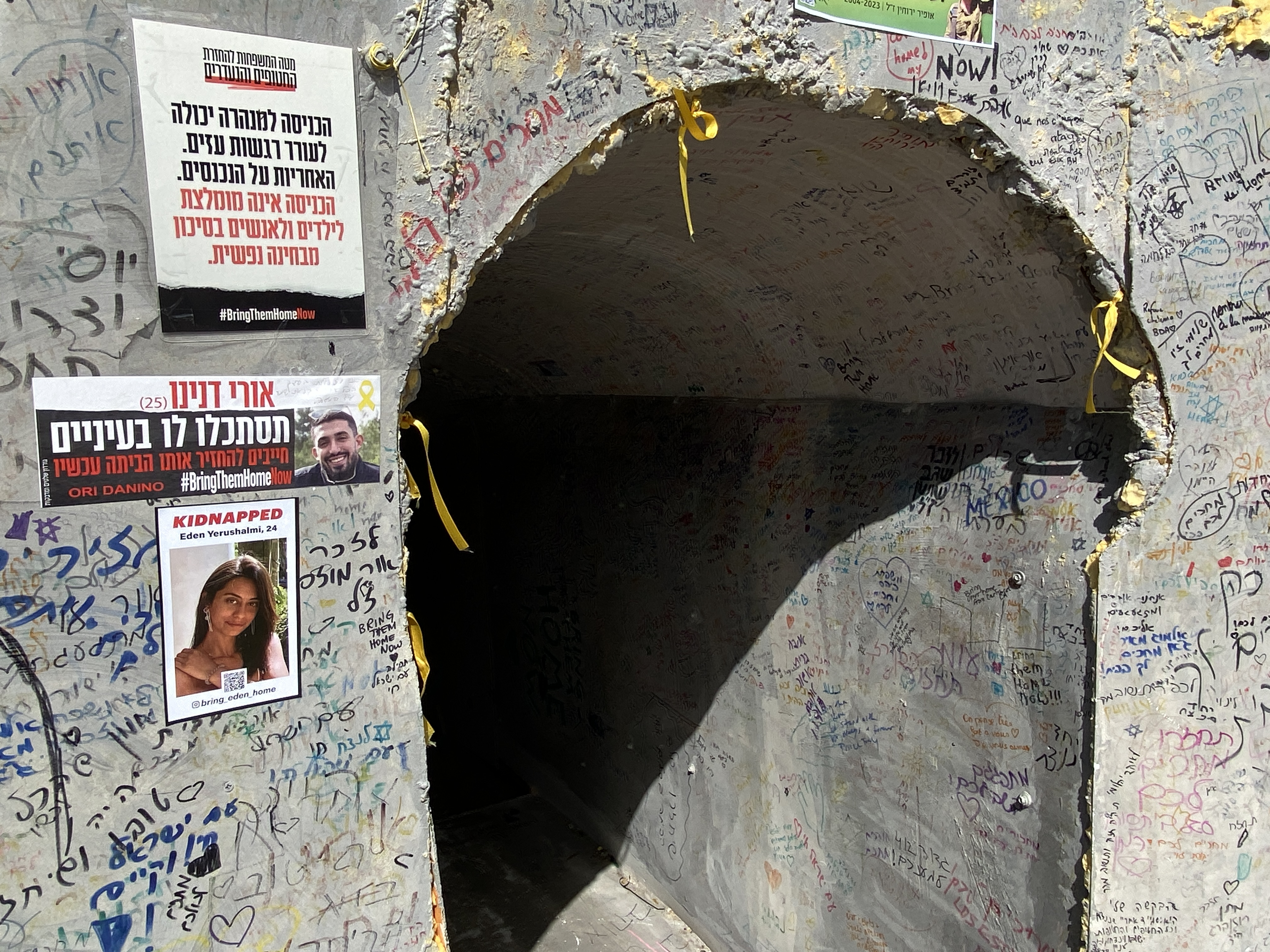
Performance piece The Kidnapped Tunnel in Hostages Square in Israel

American-Israeli author Robby Berman set up a fund offering a reward of a million Israeli shekels for the release of hostages in Gaza, specifically aimed at encouraging Palestinians to aid in the rescue of Jewish hostages.

Experts stated that an Israeli ground invasion of the Gaza Strip would endanger the lives of the hostages. U.S. officials said the Biden administration advised Israel to delay the ground invasion of Gaza to allow more time for hostage negotiations. According to Israeli officials, once Israel begins a ground invasion of Gaza, it will be almost impossible to reach a deal on the release of the hostages. On 24 October, US President Joe Biden rejected calls for a ceasefire, stating "We should have those hostages released and then we can talk".

== Status of hostages ==
On 22 October 2023, a list of the 204 hostages was published.

According to Israel, at least 250 additional individuals were captured on the first day of the war, but rescued that day.

As of 6 June 2024, Hamas refused to allow representatives of the International Committee of the Red Cross to meet with the 7 October hostages in Gaza. The hostages are believed to have been dispersed among different Hamas members and factions, as well as among other militant groups, gangs, and families.

=== Negotiations ===
On 10 October 2023, the spokesperson for Hamas's military wing Abu Obaida broadcast a message on Al Jazeera that Hamas would not consider any hostage negotiations unless Israel ceased any military effort to respond to Hamas attacks.

In a reconstruction of the negotiations, Franklin Foer has written that by 13 October 2023, the Emir of Qatar, Tamim bin Hamad Al Thani in a discussion with Antony Blinken, said that Hamas had succeeded far beyond its expectations in taking far more hostages than it could manage, and was disposed to release some in exchange for a pause in Israeli airstrikes. Qatar had conveyed this readiness to Israel, without succeeding in getting the Israelis to focus on the proposal. Attempts by the Americans to follow up on this possibility only met with an Israeli unwillingness to explore the option.

In November 2023, Hamas offered a deal dubbed as "everyone for everyone" or "all for all" — a release of all hostages being held in Gaza in exchange for Israel releasing thousands of Palestinians in Israeli prisons. Some Israeli families have spoken in support for such a deal.

Shortly after the October attacks Thailand had been in official talks with Hamas with a group convened by the countries parliamentary speaker Wan Muhamad Noor Matha about the release of their citizens. The group conveyed to Hamas that the citizens were not party to the conflict, but instead part of the around 30,000 Thai laborers who work in the Israeli agriculture sectors. While some had been captured about 39 were killed in the attacks and about 8,600 repatriated back to Thailand.

On 8 November, Hamas sources told news agencies that Hamas could release 10–15 hostages in exchange for a three-day humanitarian pause in fighting. On 9 November, Benjamin Netanyahu had reportedly rejected such an exchange. On 13 November it was reported that Hamas had told Qatari mediators that the group was willing to release up to 70 women and children hostages held in Gaza for a five-day truce and the release of 275 women and children held by Israel.

On 9 November, Al-Quds Brigades released a video where spokesperson Abu Hamza states that they are prepared for the unconditional release of 77-year old Hanna Katzir, citing humanitarian reasons and their inability to provide her with her specific medical needs, as well as the release of 13-year old Yagil Yaakov. Israel refused the offer, claiming it would play into the captor's "psychological terror". On 21 November, it was erroneously reported that Katzir had died from medical complications, however she was still alive and was released on 24 November. Yagil Yaakov, alongside his older brother, were released on 27 November.

On 22 November it was announced that Israel and Hamas had reached an agreement about a cease fire and the release of 50 hostages. While hostages held by Hamas would not be released until 23 November at the earliest, those released would be woman and children, in response the Israeli government would release 150 Palestinian prisoners, more aid would be allowed into Gaza and a four-day cease-fire which would be added onto for every 10 additional hostages released. Hamas has acknowledged that of the hostages released children would be the main component of the hostages released, and the IDF has planned that an IDF officer would be on hand to facilitate the crossing and handover with the hostages being transferred into Israel for medical care. As of 26 November, Hamas had released a total of 58 hostages since the ceasefire went into effect, some of whom were foreign nationals and not included in the agreement to release 50 Israelis.

In April 2024 it was reported that a senior Hamas official stated that the group did not have 40 living hostages in Gaza that met the criteria for an exchange under a proposed cease-fire that was being negotiated. Negotiators had proposed an initial six week cease-fire in which Hamas would have released held hostages in waves, with a primary group of 40 to consist of women, older people, ill hostages and five female IDF troops, with Israel releasing Palestinians held in Israeli prisons among other demands.

During the January 2025 Gaza war ceasefire 33 Israeli and 5 Thai hostages were released by Hamas and about 2,000 Palestinian prisoners were released by Israel. Israel sought to extend the first phase of the ceasefire by 42 days. On 19 February 2025 Hamas said that it was ready to release all the remaining hostages in one batch rather than in stages during the second phase of the ceasefire agreement.

On 3 September 2025, Hamas announced that it is prepared to release all hostages held in Gaza in exchange for an agreed number of Palestinian prisoners, with the proposed deal to include a complete ceasefire and the withdrawal of Israeli troops from the enclave.

On 29 September 2025, U.S. President Donald Trump and Israeli Prime Minister Benjamin Netanyahu announced in a press conference at the White House that they had reached an agreement on Gaza war peace plan, which would be implemented moving forward. The plan includes the cessation of hostilities, the return of all Israeli hostages, both living and deceased, within 72 hours, and the establishment of a governance alternative to Hamas. The remaining twenty living hostages were released on the morning of 13 October.

=== Rescue and body recovery operations ===
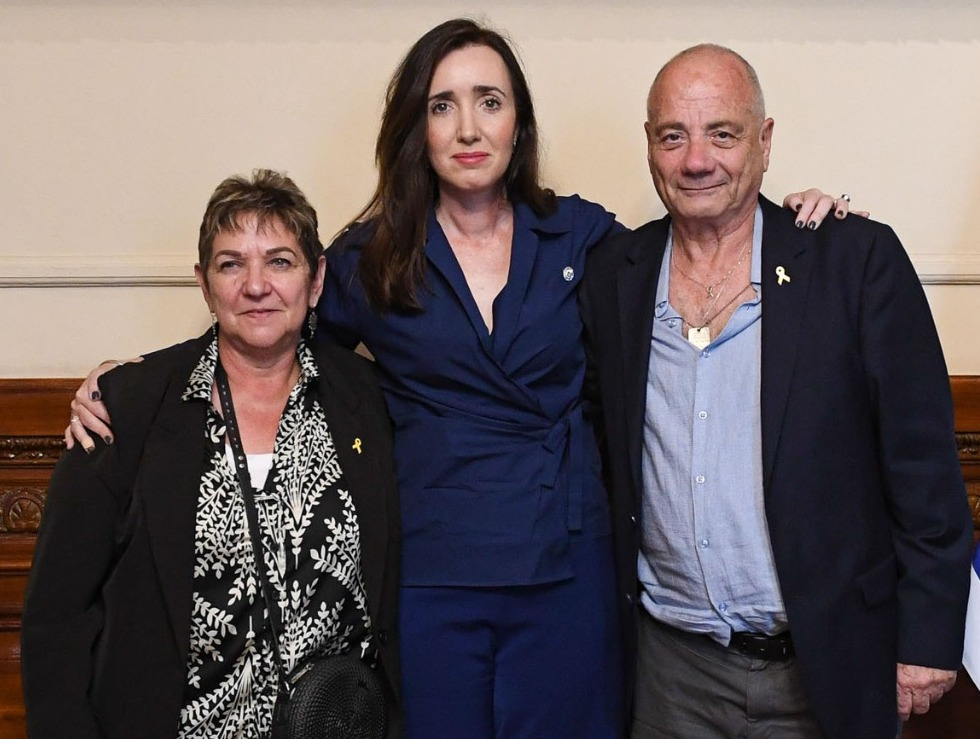
Former hostages Clara Marman (left) and Louis Har (right) alongside Argentine vice president Victoria Villarruel (centre) in September 2024.

A captured IDF private was freed on 30 October 2023 in an operation headed by Israel Defense Forces (IDF), with assistance from Shin Bet and Mossad. On 8 December, Hamas claimed they repelled an attempted hostage rescue by Israeli special forces, inflicting several military casualties. Hamas also said that a hostage named Sahar Baruch died in the incident. On the same day of 8 December, according to an IDF statement, two Israeli soldiers were wounded in a failed hostage rescue attempt. It is unclear whether the statements of Hamas and the IDF refer to the same event.

During the early morning of 12 February 2024, the IDF, Shin Bet and special police forces coupled with related airstrikes, rescued two hostages with dual Israel-Argentinian nationality, 60 year-old Fernando Simon Marman and 70 year-old Louis Har, who were kidnapped from Kibbutz Nir Yitzhak during the October 7 attacks by Hamas, from a building in Rafah in southern Gaza. One Israeli soldier was injured and 37 Hamas militants, including the hostages' guards, were reported killed during the rescue operation.

In May 2024, it was reported that—based on IDF interrogations of detained reported members of Hamas in Gaza—an overnight operation led to the recovery of the bodies of four people killed on 7 October, near the site of the Re'im music festival massacre. On 31 May 2024, the IDF withdrew from Jabalia after a weeks-long operation, during which troops recovered the bodies of seven Israeli hostages.

On 8 June 2024 four hostages who had been abducted during the Re'im music festival massacre were rescued from two separate areas in the Nuseirat refugee camp by members of Yamam (Israel's national counter-terrorism unit), Shin Bet and the IDF. Airstrike cover for the operation and resulting firefights reportedly caused the deaths of over 200 Palestinians per the Gaza Health Ministry, while Israel claims only 100 Palestinians were killed.

On 19 January 2025 it was publicized that Israeli troops recovered Oron Shaul's body which had been held by Hamas since 2014. The recovery operation was carried out jointly by the IDF and the Shin Bet security agency, with several special forces units including the Navy's Shayetet 13 commando unit and another elite force in the Military Intelligence Directorate. The IDF did not reveal exactly when the operation took place, nor where in the Gaza Strip they found the body. Shaul's body was brought back to Israel and taken to the Abu Kabir Forensic Institute where it was identified.

=== Release of hostages ===
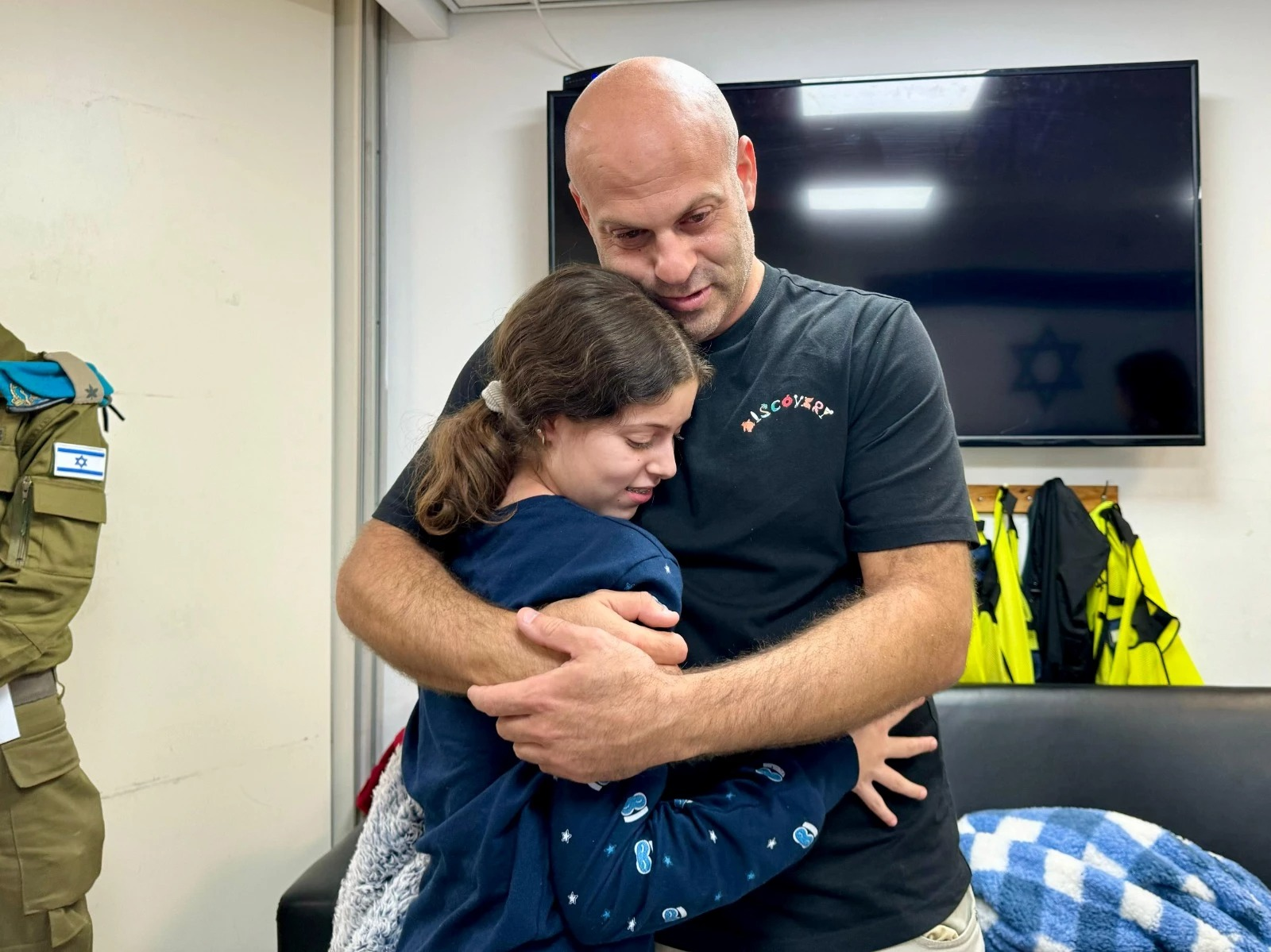
Hila Rotem, aged 13, embraced by her uncle, Yair Rotem, upon their reunion on 26 November 2023, following her release. Her mother, Raaya Rotem, would be released on 29 November 2023.

On 20 October 2023, Hamas released two American hostages for humanitarian reasons and in response to Qatari and US pressure. The International Committee of the Red Cross (ICRC) said it helped facilitate the release of the hostages by transporting them from Gaza to Israel. On 23 October, Hamas released two Israeli women hostages, aged 79 and 85, for humanitarian reasons after mediation by Qatar and Egypt. The ICRC helped transport them out of Gaza. The released hostages were from the Nir Oz kibbutz. One of the released hostages, Yocheved Lifshitz, and her husband Oded, a journalist still in captivity, were known peace activists that helped Palestinians in Gaza get to hospitals in Israel. Lifshitz's daughter Sharone said that Lifshitz and other hostages were held in a "huge network" of tunnels. Lifshitz was critical of both the Shin Bet and the IDF, and the press conference was criticized as a PR disaster for Israel.

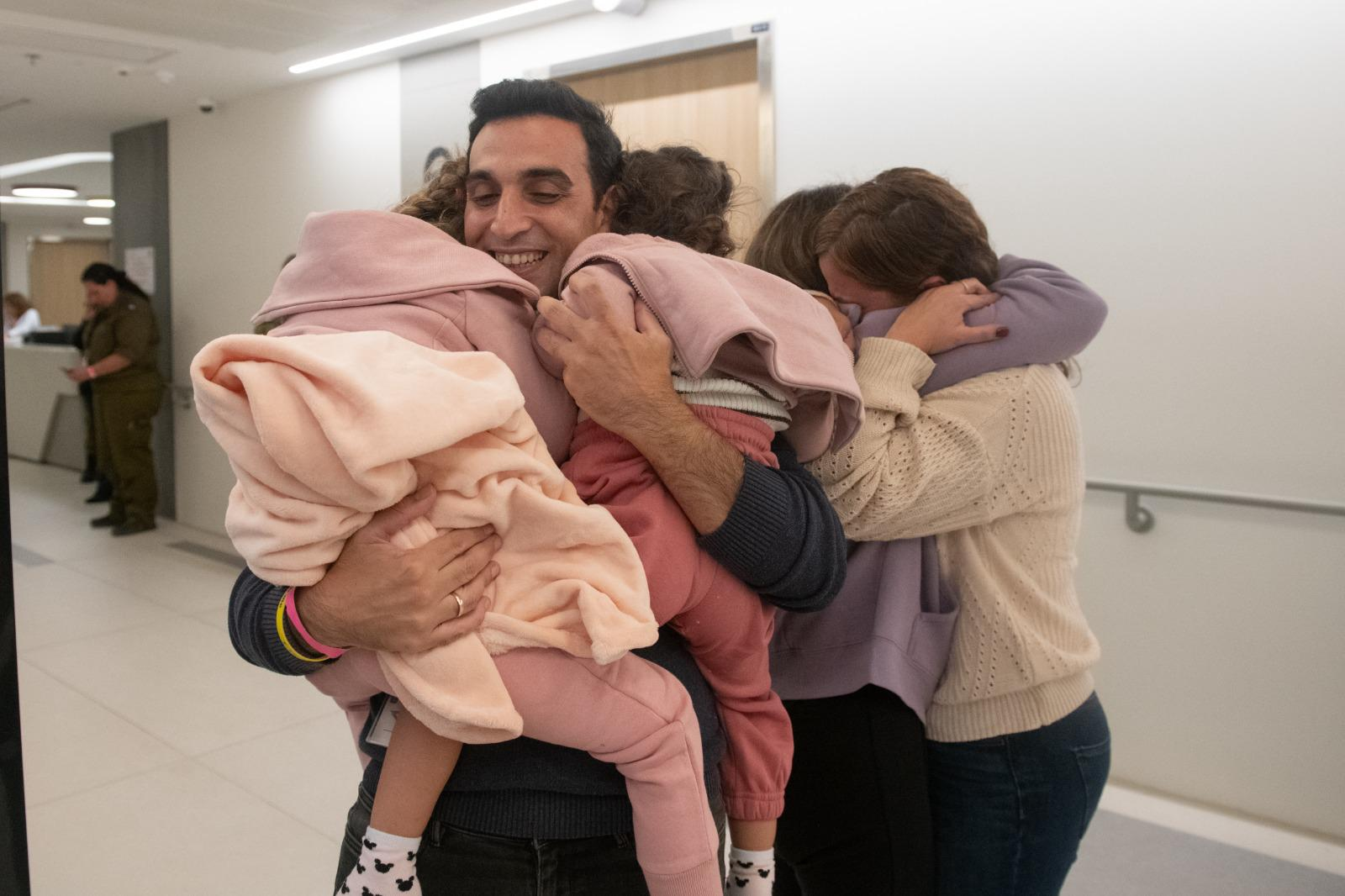
Release of hostages during the Gaza war

On 27 October, a Hamas official said that Hamas could not release the hostages taken during the attack on Israel until a ceasefire was agreed on. On 22 November, Israel and Hamas agreed to the release 150 of Palestinian prisoners and a four-day cease-fire in exchange for Hamas's release of approximately 50 of the hostages. On 24 November, the release of 50 women and children hostages by Hamas over a four-day period began after negotiations with Israel, with hostages being released into the care of the Red Cross through the Rafah Border Crossing and then to the Israeli Hatzerim Military Base. Some of this group were dual and foreign nationals, with individuals from Israel, Thailand, and the Philippines counted in the first group released.

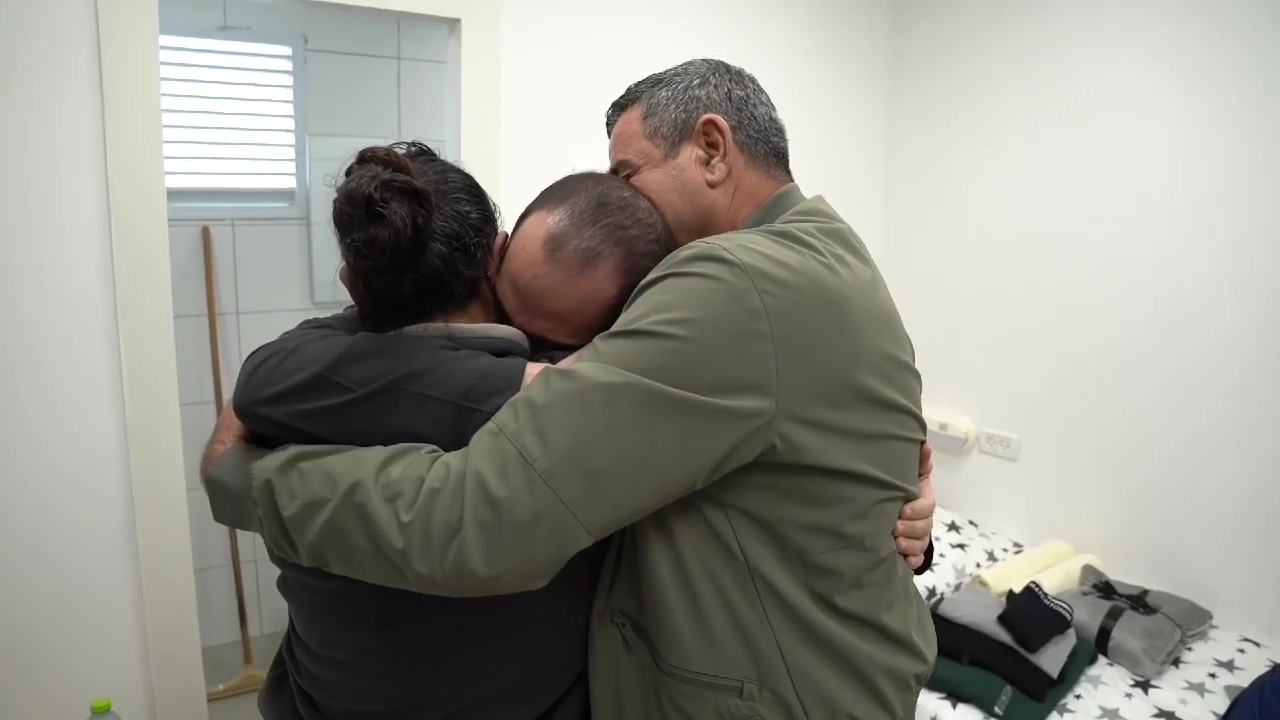
Yarden Bibas, whose wife and children were later returned dead, meets his father and sister for the first time after his release from Hamas captivity on 1 February 2025

A total of 41 hostages were released by Hamas during the four-day ceasefire. Of those released, 26 were Israeli (some being dual citizens) with a breakdown of 13 released on 24 November and 13 on 25 November. In addition, 14 Thai hostages and one Filipino were released as part of a separate deal. An additional 17 hostages (including 14 Israelis and one American) were released on 26 November, in exchange for 39 Palestinian prisoners.

Israel published a list of 300 Palestinian prisoners that it would potentially release in exchange for Israeli hostages in Gaza, 287 of which were children below the age of 18. An analysis by NBC News of the list showed about 20% were convicted of a crime, while the roughly 80% of the list were not convicted of any crimes and had either not been prosecuted or had been detained under administrative detention. However, some of the Palestinians prisoners that were freed as part of the deal had been convicted of offenses ranging from attempted murder, to less severe ones such as inflicting property damage, hindering police work or assembling unlawfully. Other offenses included assault of police officers, rock-throwing, hurling firebombs, arson, and possession of firearms or explosives. Some hostages reportedly belonged to Hamas, Palestinian Islamic Jihad and the Popular Front for the Liberation of Palestine (PFLP).

A Russian-Israeli man was released on 26 November outside of the cease fire agreement. Mousa Abu Marzook, an official within Hamas, indicated that the release was in appreciation for President Vladimir Putin's position. Putin has been openly critical of the Israeli operation in regards to Gaza and the mounting casualties.

=== Reported deaths ===
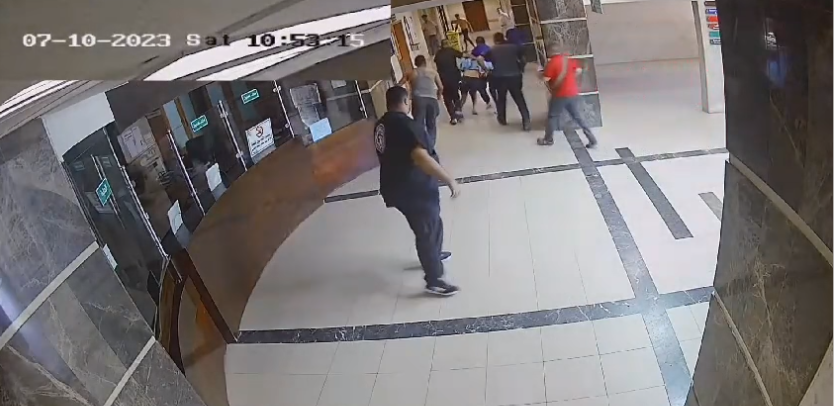
Bipin Joshi being dragged through Al Shifa Hospital by Hamas militants on 7 October 2023

The IDF confirmed on 13 October that remains of missing Israeli people were located and retrieved in the Gaza Strip. On 14 October, Hamas stated that nine hostages had been killed over a 24-hour period due to Israeli airstrikes. On 4 November, Hamas reported that 60 hostages had died as a result of Israel's bombing of Gaza. An Israeli official responded that "Regardless of what Hamas claims, any harm done to hostages is Hamas's responsibility and they will be held accountable." According to the IDF, half of the hostages were killed during the abduction or died in captivity. At least two bodies had been recovered, as of 16 November.

Along with reported CCTV footage released on 19 November, Israel announced that an IDF soldier who had been captured on 7 October had been killed by Hamas while being held at the Al-Shifa hospital. Hamas denied this and indicated the soldier had been previously reported by them as being killed by an Israeli airstrike on 9 November.

On 29 November, Hamas claimed that the youngest hostage; a 10-month old toddler and his 4-year-old brother and mother were killed while in captivity due to Israeli bombings. The claim is being investigated by the IDF and other agencies, and Israeli officials have stated the account shows the "barbarism and cruelty of Hamas".

Hamas released a video of the dead body of Arye Zalmanovich, 86, from kibbutz Nir Oz. He had been wounded during the 7 October attack and assaulted by bystanders in Gaza as he was driven on a motorcycle by his captors. According to Hamas he died of a heart attack. Zalmanovich had medical conditions and required medical treatment. His son attributed the death to the lack of medicines and suitable food in captivity.

On 15 December, the IDF stated that during operations in Shuja'iyya, they "mistakenly identified three Israeli hostages as a threat" and killed them via friendly fire. The three hostages were three men in their 20s, identified as Alon Shamriz, Yotam Haim, and Samer Talalka after having their bodies returned to Israel. According to an Israeli military official on 16 December, the three hostages were shirtless and "they have a stick with a white cloth on it. The [Israeli] soldier feels threatened and opens fire. He declares that they're terrorists"; more Israeli forces shoot, killing two hostages "immediately" and wounding the third hostage, who appealed for help in Hebrew, then "there's another burst of fire [by Israeli forces] towards the third [hostage] and he also dies". Haaretz reported that the third hostage retreated into a building after the other two hostages were shot, with IDF soldiers following the third hostage and shooting him dead because they thought he was a terrorist setting a trap. Yediot Ahronot reported that Israeli soldiers had called for the third hostage to come out of the building he was hiding in, and then shot him when he reappeared. The Israeli military investigated the killings and concluded on 28 December that the Israeli "soldiers carried out the right action to the best of their understanding of the event at that moment".

In February 2024, it was announced that through a confidential assessment conducted by Israeli intelligence officials, there were more dead hostages than previously known. In the report 32 of the hostages held in Gaza were declared as deceased, with an additional 20 hostages status still undetermined.

On 24 April 2024, Hamas had released a two-minute video of Hersh Goldberg-Polin in which he stated the need for the Israeli government to bring him home as well as that 70 of the 130 hostages have been killed in Israeli bombings. He also stated in the video that he was living in an "underground hell without water, food, sun or medical treatment".

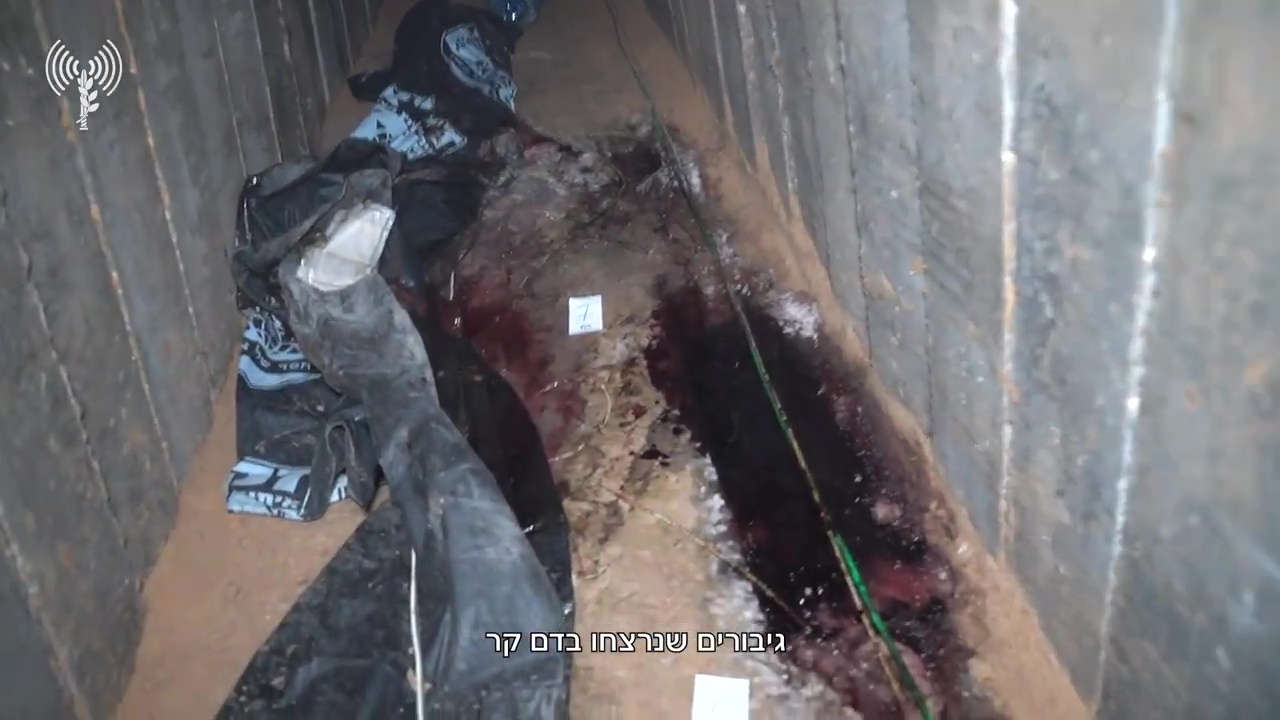
Tunnel in which six hostages were held and recovered deceased by IDF troops in August 2024. Photo taken by the IDF Spokesperson's Unit

On 31 August 2024, Hersh Goldberg-Polin's body was among six recovered from a Hamas tunnel in Rafah, Gaza. According to the Israeli health ministry, all six were executed by their Hamas captors from "close range" 1–2 days earlier. The IDF said that the captors were not present when its soldiers recovered the bodies. Hamas denied executing Goldberg-Polin, as well as the five other hostages, stating they died in an Israeli airstrike. On 2 September, Hamas announced that since June, they had implemented new instructions for managing hostages in the event of approaching Israeli forces in Gaza. Abu Obaida, the spokesperson for Hamas' Al-Qassam Brigades, did not disclose specific details but criticized Israeli Prime Minister Netanyahu's insistence on using military pressure to free hostages instead of negotiating a deal.

On 15 September 2024, the IDF stated that a thorough investigation had determined, with high confidence, that the bodies of three Israeli hostages—Corporal Nik Beizer and Sergeant Ron Sherman, both 19 years old, and Elia Toledano, a 28-year-old French-Israeli civilian—found on 14 December in a tunnel in Jabalia, were killed by an Israeli airstrike.

Former hostage Noa Argamani reported that hostage Yossi Sharabi was killed after the house they were in was blown up.

=== Gaza peace plan releases and returns ===
On 13 October 2025, with the implementation of the Gaza peace plan, Hamas released the last 20 living hostages as well as four out of the 28 deceased hostages held in Gaza, in exchange for around 1,900 Palestinian prisoners. The caskets holding the bodies were handed over to the IDF by the Red Cross during a ceremony in Gaza and were returned to Israel after crossing the Gaza-Israel border. From then, Hamas returned the bodies of 27 hostages over a period of seven weeks, the last being the remains of Thai hostage Sudthisak Rinthalak's, which were returned on 3 December.

After Rinthalak was returned, slain police officer Ran Gvili became the final hostage held in Gaza. Hamas and the Palestinian Islamic Jihad (PIJ) said that they were unable to locate his body despite searching extensively in eastern Gaza, although Israeli sources claimed that the groups knew where his body was. On 28 December, it was reported that a PIJ member who was involved in Gvili's capture was abducted by Israel in an attempt to locate his body. Israel later conditioned the reopening of the Rafah Border Crossing on Gvili's return. On 25 January 2026, Israel announced the start of a large-scale operation aimed at locating Gvili's body. The following day, Israel announced that his body was recovered from a cemetery near Gaza City on the Israeli-controlled side of the Yellow Line. The IDF had exhumed hundreds of bodies at the cemetery while searching for Gvili, and tested around 250 before Gvili was identified. His recovery made it the first time since 2014 that no Israeli hostages were held in Gaza.

== Treatment of hostages ==
Many hostages require medical treatment due to their medical conditions (such as Parkinson's, cardiovascular diseases, heart failure, diabetes mellitus, and cancer), according to a report sent to the ICRC on 15 October by Hagai Levine, a public health physician and epidemiologist who heads the medical and resilience team of the Hostages and Missing Families Forum. As of 5 December 2023, Hamas refused to grant the ICRC access to the hostages.

On 13 October, Hamas released a video purporting to demonstrate its compassion towards abducted children. The video shows armed Hamas militants patting children on the back, rocking children in a stroller, and giving a child water. On 16 October, Hamas released a video of a 21-year-old French Israeli woman pleading to be returned to her family, while someone bandages her injured arm and a scar is visible. A released hostage, who was a nurse, was moved throughout her captivity to treat other hostages and could ask for specific medicines, although she has alleged the medicines were often provided in insufficient amounts.

A still from a 2025 video released by Hamas showing Evyatar David in Hamas tunnels in which he is seen digging his own grave

Israel's Health Ministry found in November 2023 that the released hostages lost an average of 17–33 pounds (≈8–15 kilograms) in seven weeks, and they said their diet in captivity was minimal. In February 2025 it was reported that Israeli officials had intelligence that Yahya Sinwar, then leader of Hamas, instructed the starvation of all male hostages. Gilat Livni, a pediatrician and consultant in infectious diseases who worked with some of the returned children at Schneider's children's hospital, stated that they were in "generally good condition" but raised caution about the trauma that was faced. A physician advising the families of held hostages also echoed this statement, warning of the trauma faced and the long process of restoring a sense of trust and control after being released.

Renana Eitan, the head of psychiatry at the Ichilov Tel Aviv medical center, said that among the freed hostages she examined were children drugged by their captors, including with ketamine, and were suffering from withdrawal. Israel's Health Ministry's confirmed that before they were released, liberated hostages were given psychoactive drugs by their captors. Blood tests showed the drug was clonazepam, commonly used to treat epilepsy, anxiety, OCD and other cases on a short-term basis. Hamas reportedly aimed to make the hostages appear calm and happy after enduring prolonged physical abuse, deprivation, and psychological terror in captivity.

Dror Mendel, director of the Dana-Dwek Children's Hospital, described orthopedic injuries, scarring and burns, and "very low hygiene standards... lice, rashes, skin irritation [and] inflammation". Ronit Lubetzky, director of the pediatrics department, stated that some of the children have lost as much as 10 kilograms (22 lb) of body weight. Itay Pesach, director of the Edmond and Lily Safra Children's Hospital, said that patients describe "the entire range of abuse you could dream of... not different from the testimonies of people who came back from the WW2 Jewish ghettos or concentration camp". Levine spoke on the lack of medical care given to the hostages, physical and psychological abuse, and starvation: "at first there was an implicit assumption that the conditions of captivity by Hamas are reasonable. This assumption no longer exists... The situations is terrible... There's no time. The clock of some [of the hostages] is already ticking." A doctor who treated some of the 110 hostages released from captivity told the Associated Press that at least ten male and female hostages of them were sexually assaulted or abused. He declined to give his name or speak on any further details, claiming to protect the hostages identities.

A former IDF mental health officer said returning hostages who have experienced continual psychological trauma will be very cautious about saying anything that endangers other captives. She also stated returning hostages can have "black holes in their memory" and can also express sympathy for their captors due to "Stockholm syndrome". Many hostages told relatives that they were totally isolated from the outside world and had no information about their family members, who in many cases were also kidnapped or killed in the attack. Yaniv Yaacov, the uncle of hostages, said in an event in North Macedonia with the Israeli foreign minister that his two nephews were branded using the exhaust pipe of a motorcycle by Hamas. He alleged it was done so that if they escaped they could be detected through the burn. He also said his nephews were drugged.

In August 2025, a video was released by Hamas showing a skeletal hostage Evyatar David in a tunnel. In the video, Hamas attributed his emaciated condition to the 2023 Israeli blockade of the Gaza Strip, saying that the hostages were being starved as a consequence of Israel's campaign. A report by Ynetnews disputes this, arguing that David has been intentionally starved by Hamas, citing the healthier condition of his captor's arm as evidence. The brother of Or Levy, a hostage of 491 days, said that hostages were starved while their captors ate copiously, laughing at onlooking captors.

Glenn Cohen, a former Mossad psychologist, was tasked with leading the debriefing of all released hostages. He described a delicate balance between gathering information - including of medical treatment or possible abuse - and looking after the released hostage's mental health.

=== Hostage accounts ===
Hostages released by Hamas later relayed their experiences in captivity, either firsthand, via family members, or through a report from the United Nations:

==== Adults ====
- 65-year-old Israeli-American Keith Siegel described captivity as being "unbearable." The hostages were given little food and water. Siegel described being forced to help his captors extract information from a bound female hostage in a "'medieval-style' trial by torture." He was kept in tunnels and dark rooms, and was at many times threatened with death at gunpoint, physically assaulted, and spat on.
- Mexican-Israeli Ilana Gritzewsky, 31, recalls being groped by gunmen during her kidnapping on a motorcycle. Her leg was pressed against the exhaust pipe. She passed out and awoke with seven gunmen above her, with her breasts exposed and pants down. A captor told her his intentions of marrying her and keeping her in Gaza.
- 85-year-old Yocheved Lifshitz recounted being beaten on the motorcycle ride back to Gaza. She was taken through a network of tunnels, and kept in groups of five people divided by kibbutz, with each group assigned a guard. Their captors told them that they believed in the Qur'an and would not hurt them. Lifshitz received medical care, one meal a day of the same food her captors ate, and was kept in clean surroundings. "They made sure we had all needed, they cleaned the toilets – they did, not us" Lifshitz recounted. "They were very friendly to us". She summarized her two weeks in Hamas captivity saying she "went through hell".
- Roongarun Wichanguen, the sister of 33-year-old Vetoon Phoome, said that Phoome was not tortured nor assaulted, was well-fed and well taken care of.
- According to Merav Mor Raviv, cousin of 54-year-old Keren Munder, she and her 9-year-old son Ohad and 78-year-old mother Ruth ate mostly rice and bread, but neither regularly nor all the time, resulting in both Keren and Ruth losing 6–8 kg in body weight. They were kept isolated from the outside world, slept on improvised benches, and sometimes had to wait up to two hours to go to the bathroom. Ruth recalled having proper meals early in their captivity, and going hungry as the war progressed.
- After being released, 84-year-old Elma Avraham was admitted to the Soroka Medical Center in critical condition. Prior to her kidnapping by Hamas, she was diagnosed with several medical conditions and was taking medication, which her relatives say the ICRC refused to accept. According to one of her doctors, she had signs of being handcuffed, and suffered from untreated "chemical wounds".
- Eyal Nouri, the nephew of 72-year-old Adina Moshe, said that his aunt was in a room five storeys underground, that was only lit for two hours each day. She was fed canned beans and rice, and had not taken a shower for seven weeks.
- A Thai citizen who was released by Hamas testified that there was little to eat for the hostages — a pita a day, sometimes a tin of tuna to share between four people, and sometimes a piece of cheese. Held for more than seven weeks, he says they were allowed to shower once. He also stated that the Jewish/Israeli hostages were treated much more harshly: "We were with Israelis, and they were guarded all the time," and "The Jews who were held with me were treated very harshly, sometimes they were beaten with electric cables."
- Philippine citizen Jimmy Pacheco testified that, for some time, he and the other hostages only got briny water and half a pita a day. To survive, he collected pieces of toilet paper and moistened them with humidity that accumulated on the tunnel's walls.
- Ella Ben Ami, daughter of 54-year-old Raz Ben Ami, says her mother was humiliated by her captors, and now cherishes "every little thing", like having a towel, a piece of chocolate, or a drink.
- The health of 77-year-old Hanna Katzir deteriorated several days after her release. According to her daughter, Carmit Palty Katzir, "she had no heart problems when she was kidnapped, but now she has severe heart problems due to harsh conditions and starvation". Katzir died on 24 December 2024, after being released on 24 November 2023, and is the first released hostage to reportedly die from after effects of being held hostage.
- 77-year-old Margalit Moses had essential medical equipment confiscated by her kidnappers.
- 21-year-old Maya Regev and her 18-year-old brother Itay Regev testified to the hunger, harsh environmental conditions, extreme fear and sense of uncertainty that they experienced.
- 21-year-old Mia Schem was filmed before her release in early December, appearing in a Hamas propaganda video in which she said she had been treated well and kindly. She later recalled having experienced a Holocaust-like hell during captivity in Gaza, stating "Everyone there is a terrorist." Schem said she realized she was being held in a family home during her time in captivity and that the whole family was involved with Hamas, including the women and children. She also said that she was forced to record a video and instructed to say that she was treated well.
- 49-year-old Chen Almog-Goldstein stated, "Hamas guards put mattresses over us on the floor to cover us, and then they covered us with their bodies to protect us from our own forces' shooting."
- 40-year-old Amit Soussana said that she was sexually assaulted by her captor during her captivity in Gaza.
- 28-year-old Emily Damari's mother posted on social media that her daughter was denied medical treatment after being shot twice and then held in a United Nations Relief and Works Agency for Palestine Refugees in the Near East (UNRWA) facility. UNRWA later stated it was a very serious claim and would be seriously investigated, indicating a majority of their buildings had been turned into shelters and the war had caused a supply chain disruption for the Gaza Strip.
- 20-year-old former IDF soldier, Agam Berger, said that Hamas allowed her to continue practising her Jewish faith and Hamas provided her with various items, including a Jewish prayer book (siddur in Hebrew).
- Eli Sharabi, who was exchanged in 2025, said that two more hostages, Alon Ohel and Eliya Cohen, were held in a tunnel, handcuffed and starved while their captors ate full meals in front of them. Sharabi supported them and communicated with their captors in Arabic. Sharabi emerged emaciated after 491 days and learned that his wife and two teenage daughters had been killed in the 7 October attack.
- Omer Shem Tov was held alone in a tunnel for 450 days.
- On 22 February 2025, two Israeli hostages, Eviatar David and Guy Gilboa-Dalal, were taken to watch the release of three other hostages, Omer Shem Tov, Eliya Cohen and Omer Wenkert, after 505 days. David and Gilboa-Dalal were not freed, but remained imprisoned.
- Guy Gilboa-Dalal said that he was repeatedly sexually assaulted by his captor during his captivity in Gaza and threatened with death if he spoke out.
- Edan Alexander was held in underground tunnels, Hamas safe houses, mosques, schools, and tents of displaced Palestinians. He was once transferred by a militant that was disguised as a woman, going through a busy Gaza market. He was kept with Matan Zangauker for some time. He was forced to drink only sea-water, given only dirty bread, and lost about 20 kg in weight. he described captivity as "year of hell."
- Dani Elgarat said that his brother Itzik who was held with Edan Alexander and whose body was returned in March 2025 died due to a heart attack as he was subjected to torture during interrogations.
- Ohad Ben Ami testified before the Knesset that food was scarce and they were constantly worried about being killed by captors or by IDF strikes. He said that he and five other hostages were given an hour to decide amongst themselves which three will be killed and which three would get shot in the knee, while being filmed. A captor then told them they could be forgiven after satisfactorily denouncing the government. After the denunciations, they were returned to their places.
- Rom Braslavski said that he was sexually assaulted by his captors during his captivity in Gaza. He said that he was also blindfolded for three weeks and that stones were pushed into his ears to limit his hearing ability, and his rations of food and water were also reduced. He also said that he was repeatedly tied up, punched and assaulted with a metal cable several times a day.

==== Children ====
- According to Ahal Besorai, the uncle of 17-year-old Noam and 13-year-old Alma Or, the two were driven out of the safe room in Be'eri, when their captors set the house on fire with them in it. They were captured and driven back to Gaza in a stolen car, with Noam in the trunk and his sister among eight captors at the front. They were kept separated from their father, Dror, who is also believed to have been kidnapped. They both lost weight.
- Devora Cohen, the aunt of 12-year-old Eitan Yahalomi, said that he was beaten by Gazan residents and forced to watch videos of the 7 October atrocities. For the first 16 days of his captivity he was kept in isolation; after a month he was joined with a group of hostages from his home kibbutz, whom he knew. Any time he or another child cried, they were threatened with guns to keep quiet.
- Thomas Hand, father of 9-year-old Emily Hand, noted that she and the other hostages that were with her always had at least one meal a day, but she was still hungry and lost weight. She was not beaten, but could not make noise and was only allowed to draw and play cards. As a result of the trauma, she continued to talk in whispers even after being released. She referred to her place of captivity as "the box".
- Gilad Korngold, grandfather of 3-year-old Yahel and 8-year-old Nave, said that Yahel kept whispering for several days after being released, and Nave doesn't talk at all.
- 17-year-old Agam Goldstein-Almog described another female hostage in captivity being sexually abused by a guard while she was washing herself in the sink.

== Notable hostages ==
=== Noa Argamani ===
Israeli student Noa Argamani, who was at the trance party near Re'im, was kidnapped while with her partner Avinatan Or. They were filmed being taken by the militants to Gaza, after WhatsApp messages they sent asking for help from their hiding place from 8:10 a.m. were exposed. The footage showed Argamani being taken on a motorcycle while reaching out for Or, who was led away by his captors on foot. Argamani survived an explosion of the house she was kept in and was eventually rescued along with three other hostages on 8 June 2024.

=== Bibas family ===
Militants abducted the Bibas family from kibbutz Nir Oz during the Nir Oz massacre: 9-month-old Kfir, 4-year-old Ariel, 32-year-old mother Shiri, and her 34-year-old husband Yarden. Shiri's parents, also abducted from their kibbutz, were later found deceased. Efforts to release Shiri and her children during the ceasefire between Israel and Hamas were unsuccessful, leading to claims by Hamas that they were killed in an Israeli airstrike. The IDF expressed doubts about these claims, amidst widespread concern and a campaign for their release. On 1 February 2025 Yarden Bibas was released during the 2025 ceasefire and prisoner exchange.

On 20 February, Hamas handed over coffins alleged to contain the bodies of Shiri, Kfir and Ariel. Israel confirmed that the bodies of Ariel and Kfir had been received and said that the forensic testing showed that they had been murdered in captivity. However, it stated that the adult female remains handed over were not of Shiri Bibas. The following day, her remains were handed over.

=== Hersh Goldberg-Polin ===
23-year-old American-Israeli Hersh Goldberg-Polin was abducted by Hamas during the Re'im music festival massacre. During the festival, Hersh took refuge in a field shelter. His friend Aner Shapira died while repelling grenade attacks, and Hersh lost an arm before being abducted. His mother, Rachel Goldberg, has since been vocal in international and diplomatic arenas, including the United Nations and the March for Israel in Washington, D.C., campaigning for his release and demanding humanitarian intervention. He was held hostage for almost 11 months, until his body was recovered from a tunnel in Rafah in the Gaza Strip on 31 August 2024. It was later reported by the Israeli government that Goldberg-Polin and five other hostages with him were killed by Hamas, shot from "close range" 1–2 days before their bodies were found. Their killings sparked nationwide protests in Israel about the continuation of the hostage crisis.

=== Naama Levy ===
Naama Levy, a 19-year-old female conscript doing her military service, was abducted by Hamas militants during the attack on the Nahal Oz kibbutz military base. Footage released by Hamas showed Levy with multiple visible injuries, including injuries to her ankles and a large bloodstain on the seat of her gray sweatpants, which led to widespread concern that she had been raped or sexually assaulted. On 24 January 2025 it was announced that Levy would be a part of the 2025 cease fire and hostage exchange process; she was released on the following day. In March 2025, Levy met with President Trump at the White House along with freed hostages Noa Argamani, Eli Sharabi, Omer Shem Tov, Doron Steinbrecher, Keith Siegel, Aviva Siegel, and Iair Horn.

=== Liri Albag ===
Liri Albag was abducted with Naama Levy during the attack on the Nahal Oz base. Albag's experience as a hostage held by Hamas for 477 days received significant national and international media attention, not only because of the duration and harshness of her captivity but also due to her actions during that time. Albag emerged as a leader among the hostages, communicating with captors on behalf of others. She was credited with saving the life of fellow hostage Amit Soussana by convincing captors that Soussana was not an IDF officer, likely preventing her execution. After her release, Albag spoke about the psychological and physical trauma endured, as well as her perspectives on the ongoing conflict. In June 2025, Albag decided to resume her military service.

=== Yarden Roman-Gat ===
Yarden Roman-Gat, a 36-year-old woman who is a dual national of Germany and Israel, along with her husband Alon and their 3-year-old daughter Gefen, were abducted by Hamas militants from their home in Kibbutz Be'eri during the Be'eri massacre and taken towards the Gaza Strip border. Yarden's act of self-sacrifice in saving her daughter during an escape attempt, and her subsequent two-month-long captivity in Gaza, garnered significant attention until her release on 29 November.

=== Omer Shem Tov ===
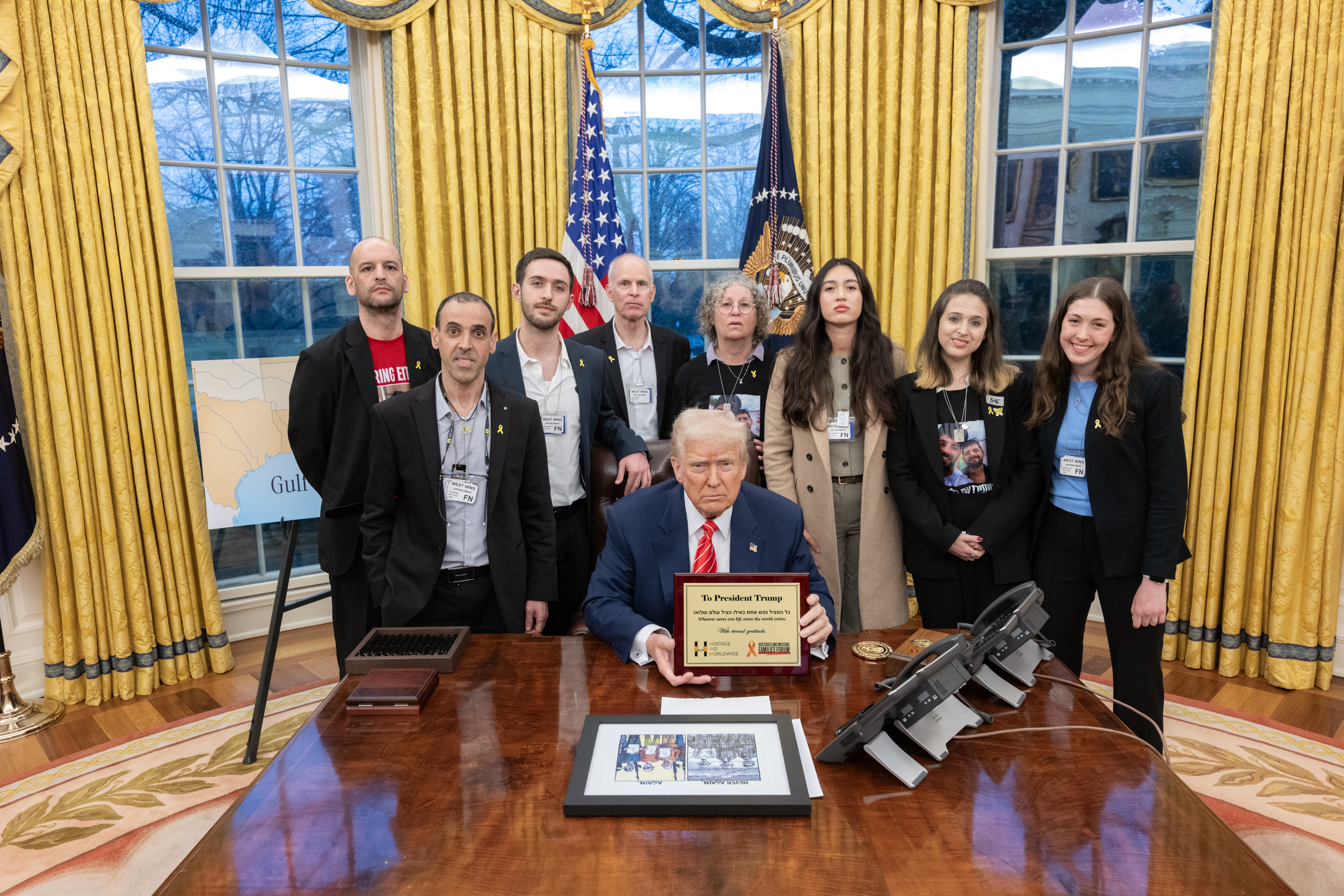
Shem Tov (third from left) meeting with President Trump at the White House. Also pictured: Iair Horn, Naama Levy, Eli Sharabi, Keith Siegel, Aviva Siegel, Doron Steinbrecher, and Noa Argamani.

Omer Shem Tov, a 21-year-old Israeli abducted from the Nova music festival, was held captive in Gaza for 505 days. His ordeal, the abuse he suffered, his refusal to cooperate with captors' demands to harm others, his increasing level of Jewish observance, and his advocacy for the other hostages brought him significant media coverage. In May 2025, Shem Tov threw the ceremonial first pitch at Fenway Park on Jewish Heritage Night.

=== Eli Sharabi ===
Eli Sharabi was abducted from his home in Kibbutz Be'eri and held for 491 days. During captivity, Sharabi lost over 30 kilograms or 40% of his body weight, returning to Israel weighing 44 kg. Following a brief mourning period for his murdered family, he began a public advocacy campaign for the remaining hostages and the return of bodies held by Hamas. He traveled to the United States, met President Donald Trump at the White House, and addressed the United Nations Security Council. In May 2025, he published the book Hostage through Sella Meir. The book, the first of its kind, describes his captivity experiences. It sold over 20,000 copies within a week, received "Gold Book" status in Israel, and was slated to be published in the US on 7 October 2025 by Harper Influence.

=== Edan Alexander ===
Edan Alexander, a 19-year-old American-Israeli at the time of his abduction from his military base inside Israel, became the last known living American citizen held hostage by Hamas during the crisis. He was released after 584 days in captivity following direct negotiations between the United States and Hamas. US Representative Josh Gottheimer described his return as "a huge day worthy of great celebration across our state."

== Responses ==
On 16 October 2023, Hamas leader Ismail Haniyeh and Turkey's Foreign Minister Hakan Fidan discussed the possibility of releasing the hostages taken during the Hamas attack on Israel.

In a video released by Hamas in October 2023, three female hostages appeared. One of the women spoke, and laid the blame for their continued situation on the Israeli government and Israeli Prime Minister Benjamin Netanyahu. She chided the Israeli government's bombing campaign, asking if they wanted all the hostages killed, and asked for the release of all Palestinian prisoners held by Israel.

A poll by the Israeli newspaper Maariv, conducted on 18–19 October 2023, found that 65% of Israelis supported a ground invasion of the Gaza Strip and 21% opposed it. In comparison, according to a poll conducted for the same newspaper on 25–26 October, only 29% of Israelis supported an immediate large-scale ground offensive into the Gaza Strip. Maariv said that "It is almost certain that the developments on the matter of the hostages, which is now topping the agenda, have had a great impact on this shift."

On 21 February 2024, Finance Minister Bezalel Smotrich stated the hostages' return "is not the most important thing". In May 2024, Orit Strook, the Minister of Settlements and National Missions, criticized a potential hostage deal, stating there are "soldiers who left everything behind and went out to fight for goals that the government defined, and we throw it in the trash to save 22 people or 33 or I don't know how many".

During a debate regarding the status and repatriation of bodies of deceased suspected and confirmed Hamas militants in a June 2024 political-security cabinet meeting, Minister Ben Gvir stated the releasing of the bodies of militants limited Israel's ability to use them as leverage to exchange for hostages or bodies of hostages.

=== Families of hostages ===
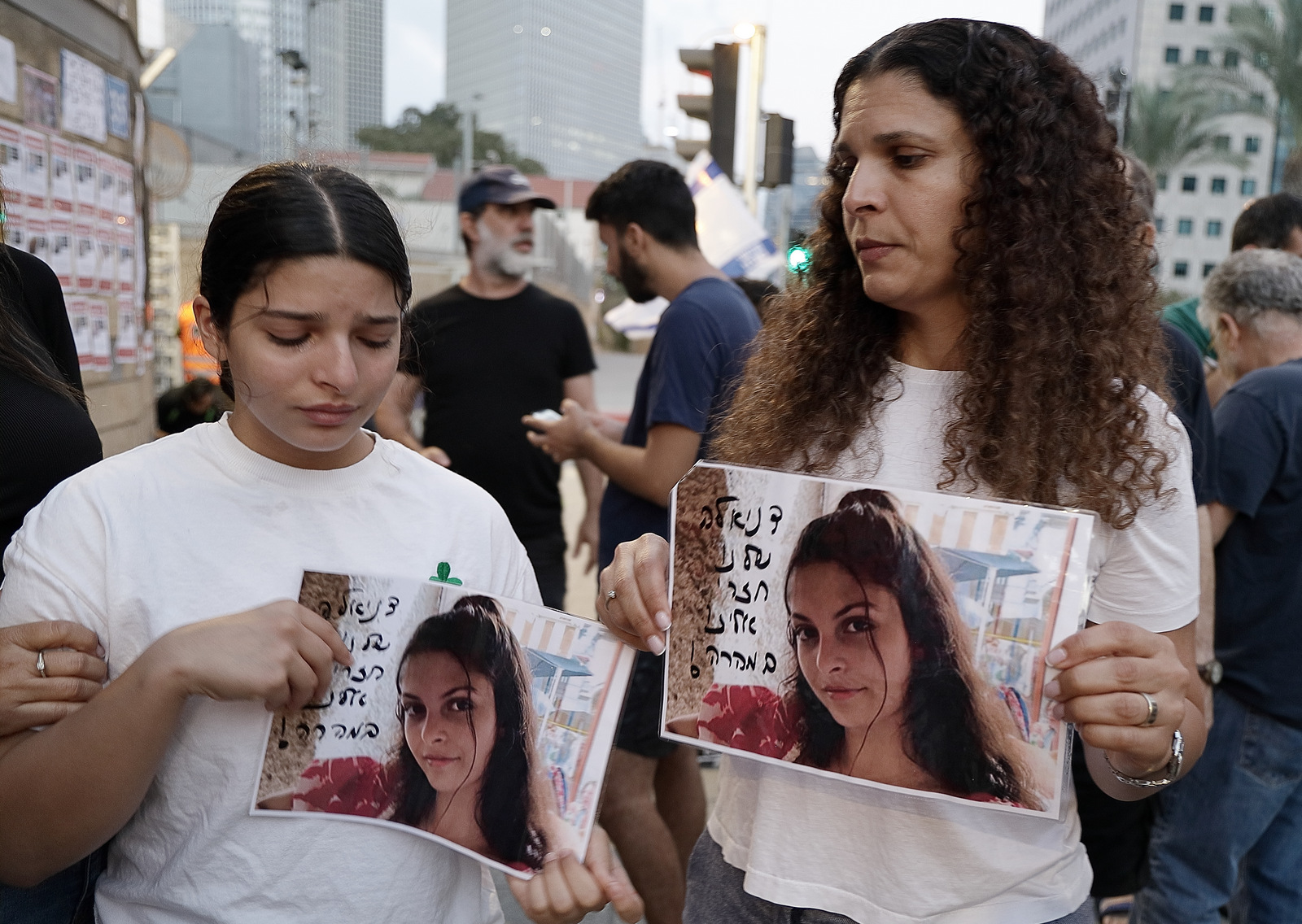
Family of 19-year-old Daniella Gilboa at a demonstration for the hostages' return, 14 October 2023

Human rights groups, international organizations, and families of those held captive have called for an immediate release of the hostages. On Sunday evening, 8 October, the families of the kidnapped and missing held a press conference, demanding the government open ongoing talks with the families and carry out an operation to bring the missing home, appoint someone to maintain ongoing contact with the families, immediately involve Turkish President Erdogan, Saudi Crown Prince Mohammed bin Salman, and Egyptian President Abdel Fattah el-Sisi, to release the captives. The government appointed Gal Hirsch to be in charge of the issue.

On 26 October, the families of the hostages met with Netanyahu. The Hostages and Missing Families Forum, that represents families of the abducted people, complained that no-one had explained "whether the ground operation endangers the well-being of the 229 hostages". The families also raised complaints that the government and Netanyahu had failed to provide updates to the families or meet with them until the meeting on 26 October. Meirav Gonen, a representative for the families, expressed support for a full prisoner swap, stating: "a deal of a return of our family members immediately in the framework of 'all for all' is feasible, and there will be wide national support for this." According to one rabbi, Alberto Somekh, citing Talmud Gittin 45A, the Mishnah affirms that 'captives should not be redeemed for more than their value, to prevent abuses.' The view has been cited as one where religious principles are interpreted in a way to support the Netanyahu government's widely criticized position.

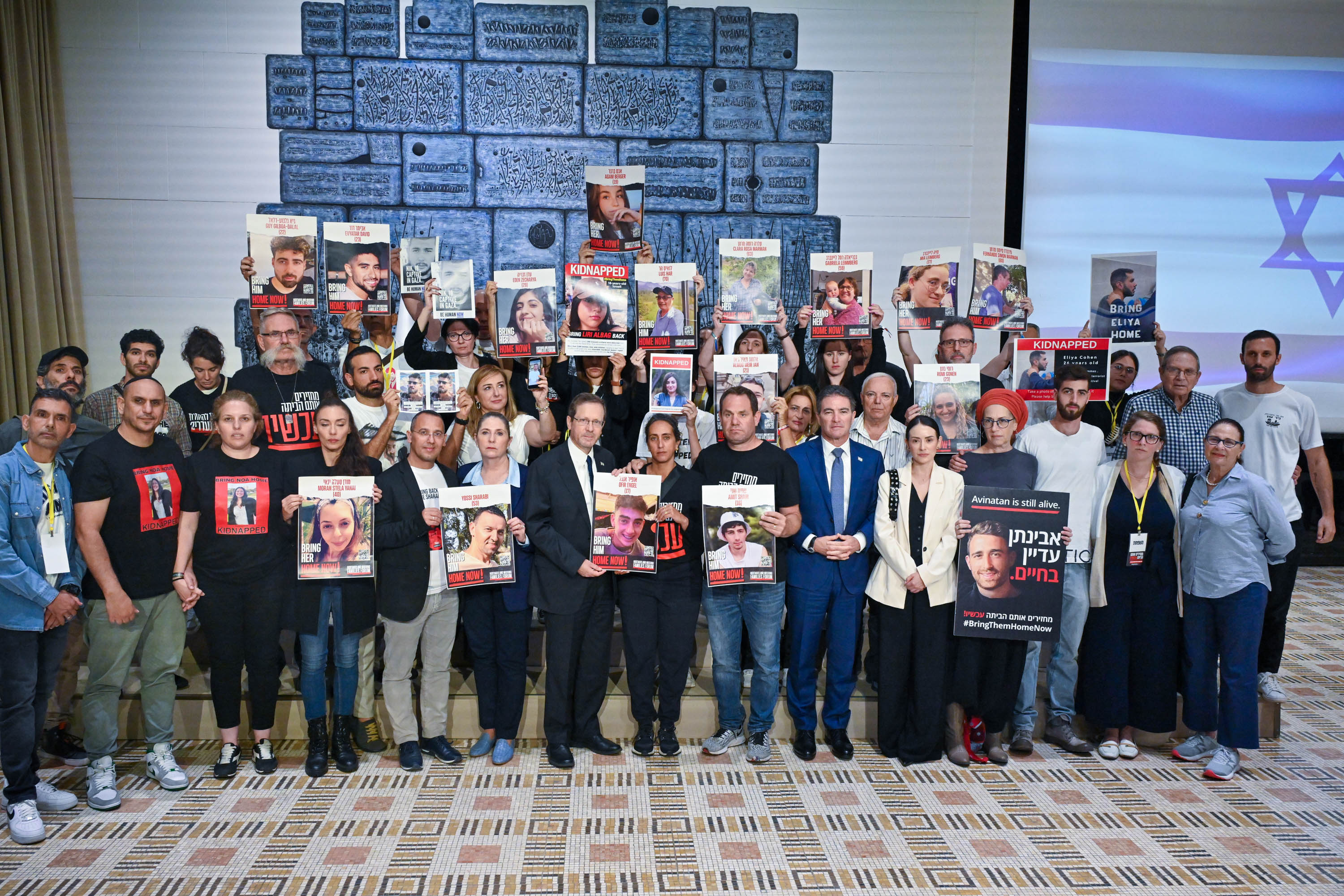
Israeli President Isaac Herzog meeting with families of the kidnapped and missing persons held by Hamas

On 14 November, it was reported that families of those held hostage began a five-day-long march to Netanyahu's home in Israel to demand action and answers. One family member was quoted as saying they did not feel like they were in good hands, and that they do not get enough information, while another called on the perceived in action of the Israeli government. On 2 December, at a rally outside the IDF headquarters in Tel Aviv, Israeli hostages released by Hamas called for the immediate release of fellow hostages left behind. On 4 December, eight released Israeli hostages wrote a letter to the International Committee of the Red Cross, asking the organization to provide medical assistance and to visit their relatives still being held by Hamas in Gaza. The appeal was made due to reports, that the Red Cross was not allowed to visit the hostages since the beginning of the war, as for 29 November.

In an early December 2023 meeting with Netanyahu and other members of the war cabinet, family members of those who are still held hostage by Hamas forces showed their outrage and frustration with the continued situation. In a published recording, Netanyahu can be heard blaming the end of the November 2023 cease-fire on Hamas while family members and supporters can be heard calling him a liar. Some former hostages also attended the meeting and spoke about the conditions they were held in, which were exasperated by Israeli airstrikes. One unnamed freed hostage from the kibbutz Nir Oz told Netanyahu: "Every day in captivity was extremely challenging. We were in tunnels, terrified that it would not be Hamas, but Israel, that would kill us, and then they would say Hamas killed you."

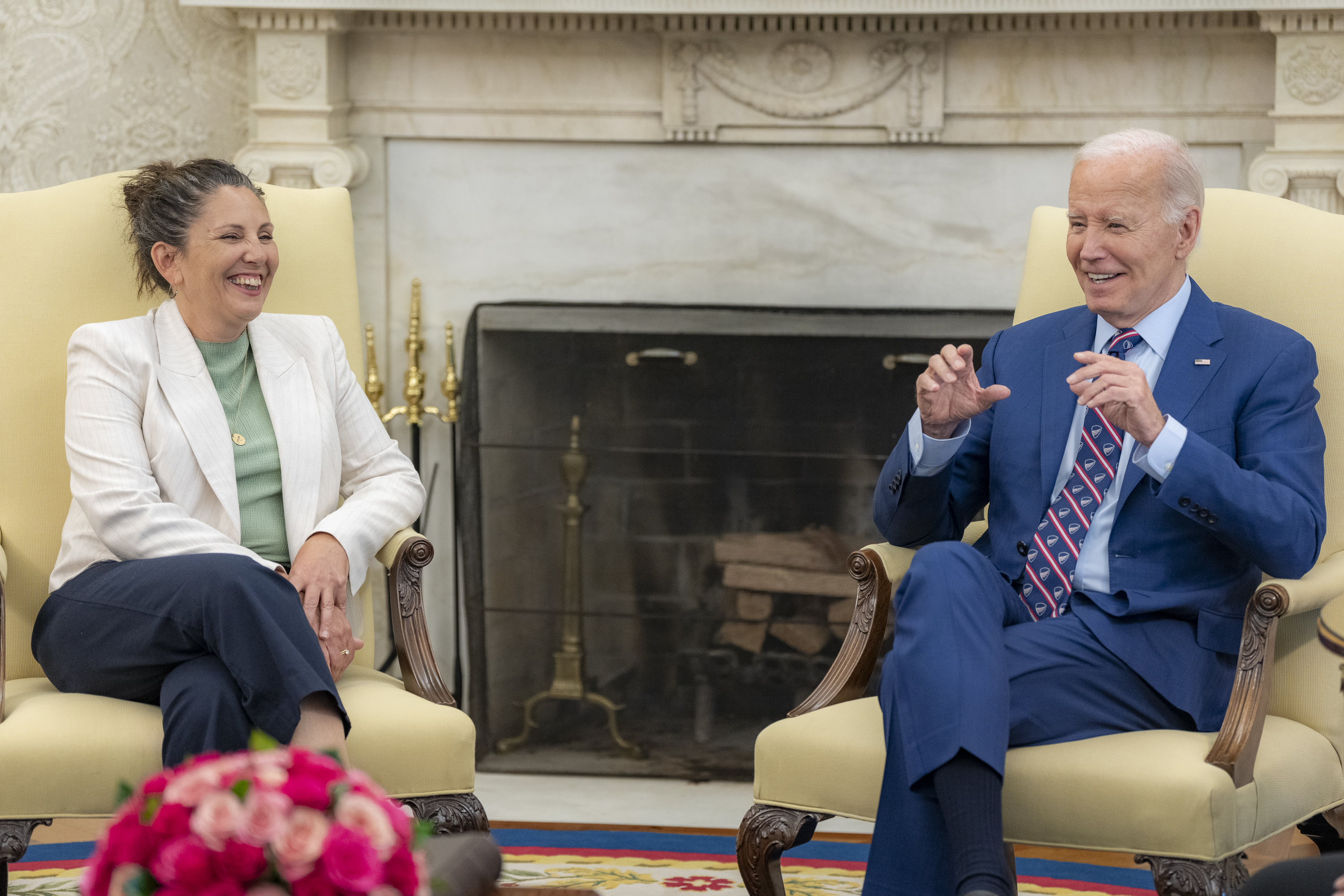
U.S. President Joe Biden meets with Liat Atzili, an Israeli-American who was freed in November after being held hostage by Hamas on 8 July 2024, in the White House

In January 2024, the mother of Ron Sherman, a deceased hostage whose body was recovered by the IDF, accused the Israeli military of killing her son by filling the tunnel he was in with poison gas. (Sherman was killed by an Israeli airstrike on 12 December.) About 20 relatives of hostages still held as captives by Hamas stormed a Knesset finance committee on 22 January, a day after Netanyahu rejected new Hamas conditions for ending the war and releasing the remaining hostages. Many voiced their displeasure at the apparent lack of resolution in having the remaining hostages freed.

That same month, the group Tsav 9 was created on Facebook and grew to over 400 members of family members of those taken hostage. The group became active in disrupting the delivery of humanitarian aid into the Gaza Strip. The group actions have caused it to be characterized as a "violent extremist" group by the United States in June 2024.

After a "Settlement Brings Security" (Hebrew: התיישבות מביאה ביטחון, romanized: Hitiashvút Mevi'ávi Takhón) Conference was held in Jerusalem on 28 January 2024, sponsored by the right-wing Nachala (Israeli settler organization) pushing for resettlement of the Gaza Strip, many family members expressed their concerns about the conference in context of the crisis. It was strongly criticized for the festive atmosphere, for the movement's forming a perceived impediment to the hostages' release, and for its calls for coerced emigration of Palestinians from their country. One family member stated of the conferencegoers "you're dancing on their blood".

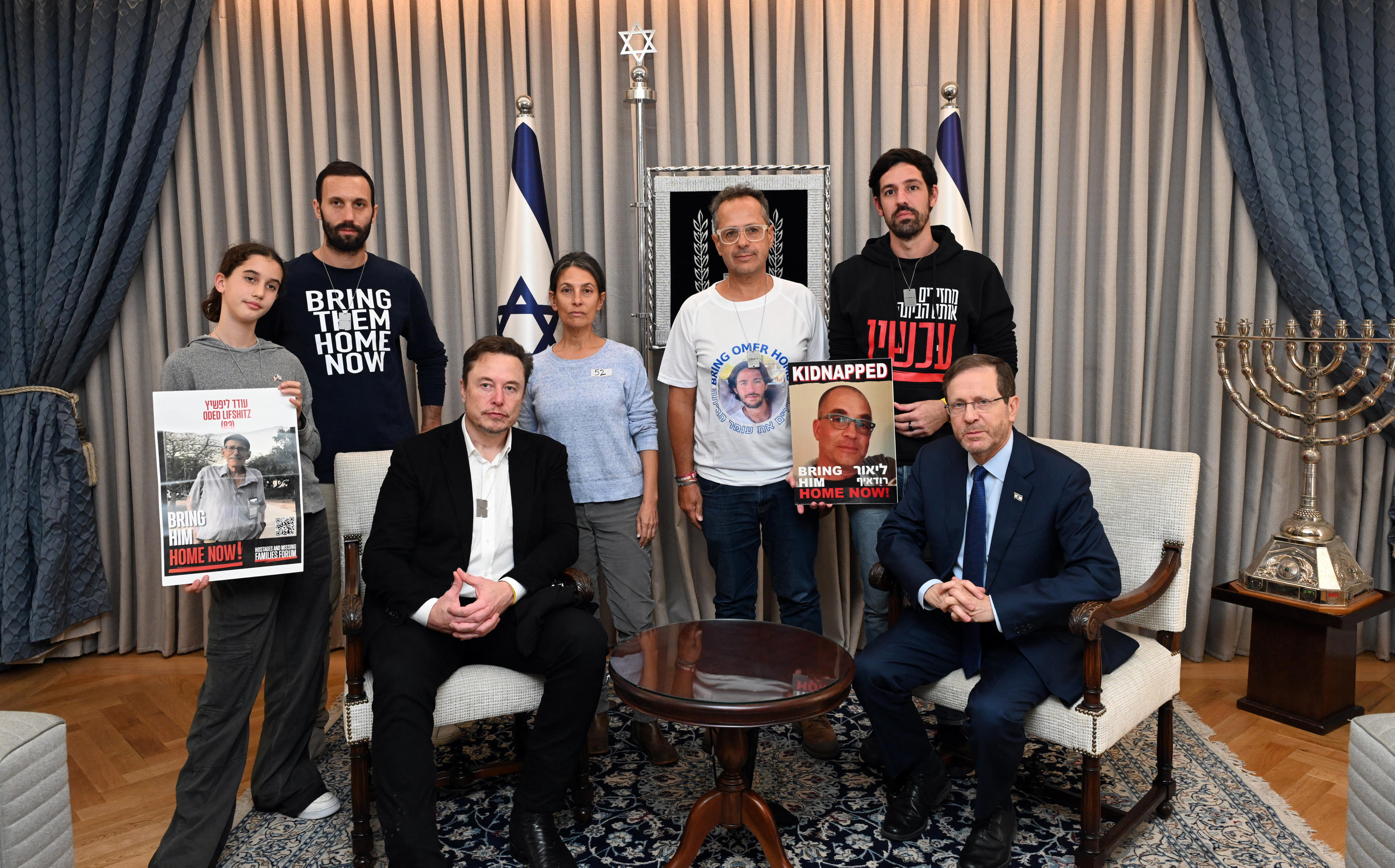
Elon Musk meets with President Isaac Herzog and families of hostages, 27 November 2023

A delegation of family members of Israeli hostages, along with several dozen lawyers, went to The Hague to file complaints against Hamas leaders at the International Criminal Court, which is empowered to prosecute individuals for serious violations of the Geneva Conventions that amount to war crimes.

After Israel's National Security Advisor Tzachi Hanegbi in May 2024 had a discussion with several relatives of the hostages, one relative told the media that Hanegbi had indicated that Israeli Prime Minister Benjamin Netanyahu would only agree to a deal regarding the hostages if, according to the relative, "it's going to be politically good for [Netanyahu], that if he sees polls that say that the Israeli public wants to see the hostages home more than it wants the continuation of the war, then he will make a deal that will bring all the hostages home".

In early-September 2024, hostage families stated that executives at Channel 14 had told them a hostage deal would not happen because it would threaten Netanyahu's coalition government. On 7 September 2024, mass demonstrations were held in support of the liberation of hostages in exchange for a cease-fire deal with Hamas. The organising groups estimated that 500,000 participated in the Tel Aviv protest, with 250,000 more at rallies around the country. This made it the largest-ever rally in Israel after the street protests organised by Peace Now on 25 September 1982, after the Sabra and Shatila massacre, with an estimated 400,000 participants, c. 10% of Israel's population; and the 2023 Israeli judicial reform protests.

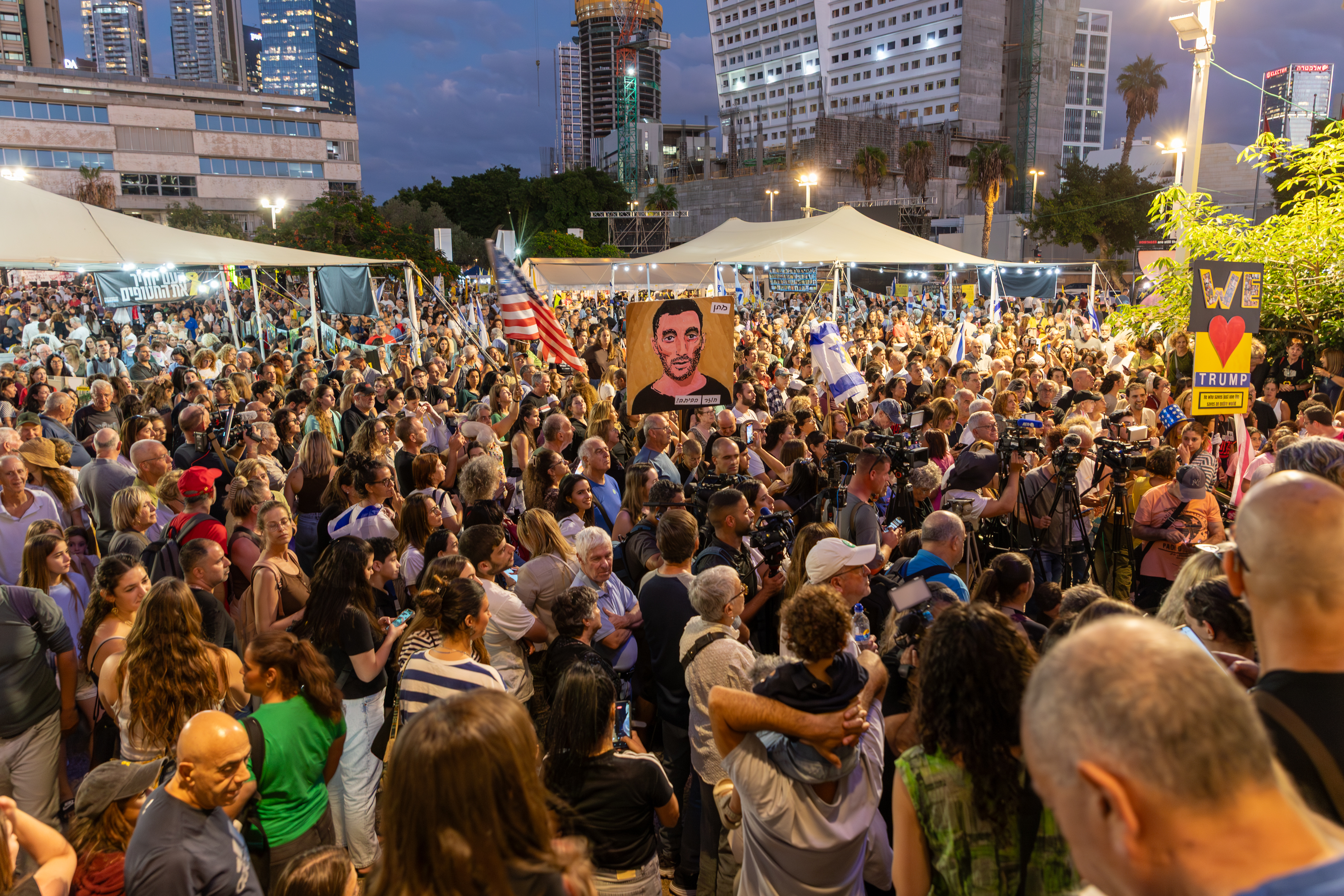
Israelis gather in Hostages Square on 9 October 2025 after announcement of the Gaza peace plan

In August 2025, after the Israeli Prime Minister's Office declared its control over Gaza City, the spouse of one hostage remarked, "This is not merely a military decision. It could represent a death sentence for those we cherish the most." The spouse of another hostage stated, "Following two years of conflict, there has been no advancement."

In the aftermath of the Israeli assault on Hamas leaders in Dodah in September 2025, numerous families of the hostages, along with their supporters, organized marches in Tel Aviv, Jerusalem, Haifa, Karmi Gat, Beersheba, and various other cities and towns throughout the nation. They expressed their belief that the attack was endangering diplomatic initiatives aimed at securing the release of prisoners who had been detained in Gaza for 708 days. "We are currently witnessing yet another intentional effort to undermine the hostage return agreement," stated the association in a press release. "This is not a conflict aimed at toppling Hamas, but rather a conflict that poses a threat to the stability of Israeli society – and we will not allow that to occur!" They called for an immediate cessation of hostilities.

=== International ===
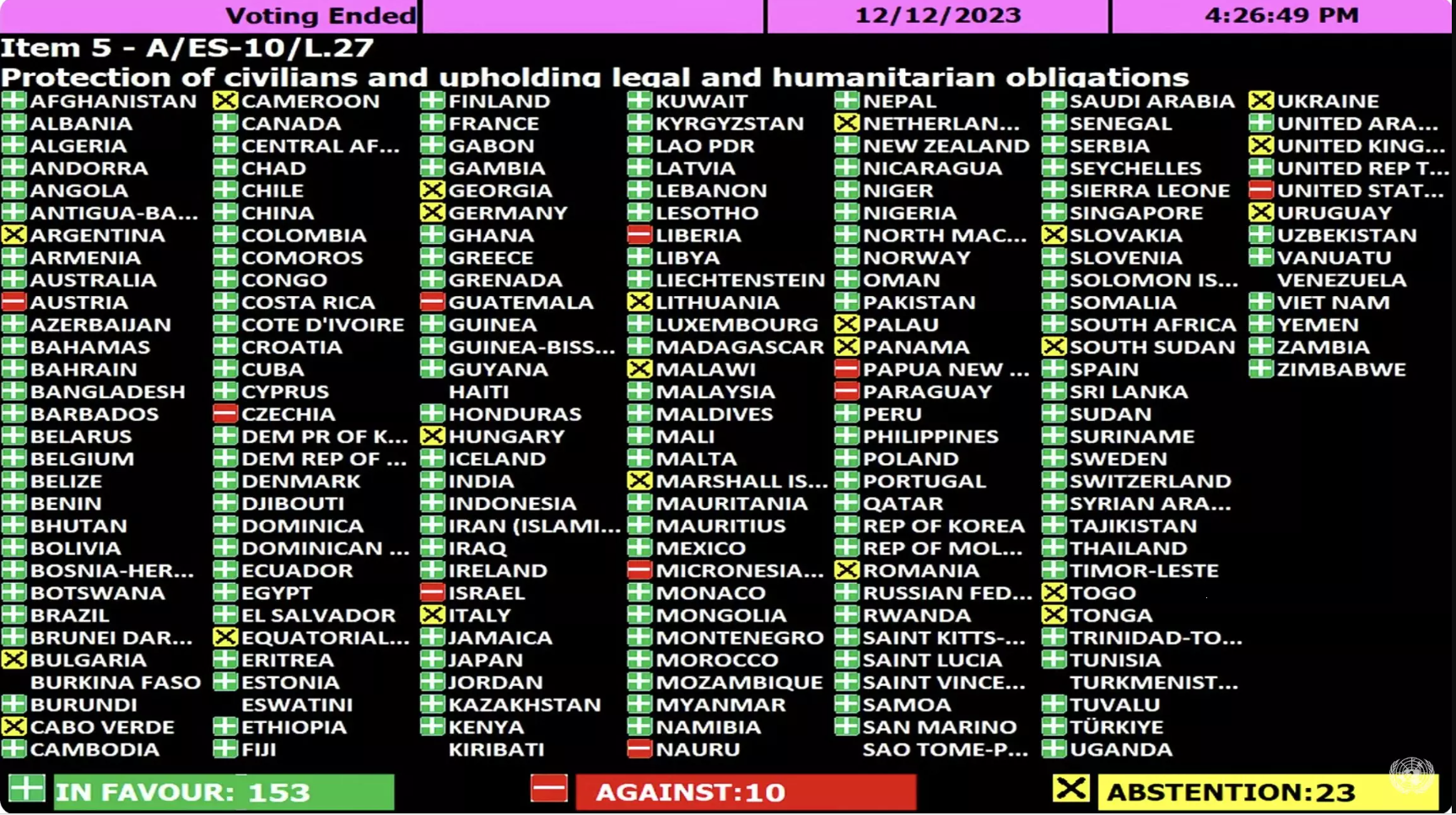
On 12 December 2023, the UN General Assembly passed Resolution ES-10/22 calling for an immediate ceasefire and the "immediate and unconditional" release of the hostages.

On 16 October 2023, a report sent to the International Committee of the Red Cross by the Geneva-based organization Hostage and Missing Families Forum medical team, headed by Hagai Levine, said hostages are "in urgent need of treatment and lifesaving medication" and are "prone to immediate mortality." The report also expressed concern about babies requiring infant formula.

On 25 October 2023, Qatar's Prime Minister and Foreign Minister Mohammed bin Abdulrahman bin Jassim Al Thani stated that there had been some progress in the hostage negotiations. That same day, World Health Organization Director General Tedros Adhanom Ghebreyesus met with the Hostages and Missing Families Forum and said:

There is an urgent need for the captors of the hostages to provide signs of life, proof of provision of health care and the immediate release, on humanitarian and health grounds, of all those abducted.

US State department spokesman, Mathew Miller suggested in response to a question about evidence of Hamas sexual and gender based violence on 7 October, that the reason Hamas was holding on to female Israeli hostages was to prevent them from testifying about their experiences in Hamas captivity.

In October 2024, a government building in Tehran—frequently used for displaying murals in both Hebrew and Persian—was updated to feature a collage of photographs of hostages held by Hamas, accompanied by the phrase "No hostages will be freed," shown in both languages.

== Hostages count ==
Description	Subtotals	Totals	Notes
Hostages taken on 7 October 2023		251	
— taken alive	most		an indeterminate number of hostages were taken dead
— taken dead	some		an indeterminate number of hostages were taken dead
Hostages taken earlier and still held		4	
— taken alive in 2014	1		
— taken dead in 2014	2		
— taken alive in 2015	1		
Hostages taken		255	
Hostages returned alive		168	
— November 2023 ceasefire	105		
— rescued by IDF	8		
— miscellaneous releases	5		
— January 2025 ceasefire	30		including the two living hostages from 2014 and 2015
— October 2025 peace plan	20		
Hostages returned dead		87	
— recovered by IDF	48		including one of the dead hostages from 2014
— killed by IDF friendly fire	3		
— January 2025 ceasefire	8		
— October 2025 peace plan	28		including the other dead hostage from 2014
Hostages returned		255	

== Timeline ==
Timeline
Date	Summary
20 July 2014	Oron Shaul dies in battle; body taken hostage
1 August 2014	Hadar Goldin dies in battle; body taken hostage
7 September 2014	Avera Mengistu, an Israeli civilian who suffers from mental illness crosses into Gaza and is taken hostage by Hamas
20 April 2015	Hisham al-Sayed, a Bedouin-Israeli civilian who suffers from mental illness crosses into Gaza and is taken hostage by Hamas
7 October 2023	251 hostages taken from Supernova music festival, Nir Oz, Be'eri, Kfar Aza, Nahal Oz and other Gaza envelope communities. Hostages include soldiers and civilians: IDF 23+ soldiers; (Israel) ~200 Jewish Israeli civilians; (Israel) 6+ Bedouin Israeli civilians (Note: Including Samer Talalka.); (Thailand) 31 Thai citizens; (Philippines) 1 Filipino citizen; (Tanzania) 1 Tanzanian citizen; (Nepal) 1 Nepalese citizen
8 October 2023	Analysis from the Washington Post determines that four hostages were killed shortly after being taken captive in Kibbutz Be'eri.
9 October 2023	Hamas's Al-Qassam Brigades threatens to execute hostages if civilian homes are bombed "without warning".
14 October 2023	Hamas reports that nine hostages had been killed over a 24-hour period due to sustained IDF airstrikes. Israeli officials responded that as the hostages were in Hamas custody, the hostages well being was their responsibility.
17 October 2023	Hamas releases a video of hostage Mia Schem; after her release she describes the video was forced against her will.
20 October 2023	Hamas releases two American hostages unilaterally.
23 October 2023	Hamas releases two elderly Israeli female hostages unilaterally.
30 October 2023	Israeli forces rescue Ori Megidish, an Israeli female soldier that had been held hostage in northern Gaza. Hamas releases a video showing three female hostages pleading to be released.
4 November 2023	Hamas claims that more than 60 hostages are missing "because of Israeli airstrikes on Gaza."
9 November 2023	Abu Obaida, spokesperson for Hamas's Al-Qassam Brigades, announced the release of two Israeli-American hostages, a mother and daughter, citing "humanitarian reasons." They were later handed over to Israeli forces at the Gaza Strip border.
14 November 2023	Three hostages are killed by an Israeli airstrike which targeted and killed Hamas Gaza City Brigade Chief Ahmed Ghandour on 14 November. Their bodies were recovered by the IDF on 15 December but the Israeli government did not publicly reveal the cause of their death until September 2024. A Hamas statement issued 22 December 2023 along with video of the hostages had stated that the organization "tried to keep them alive – but Netanyahu insisted on killing them.": (Israel) Elia Toledano, Nik Beizer, and Ron Sherman
16 November 2023	Israel announces that it has recovered the bodies of two hostages, Yehudit Weiss and Corporal Noa Marciano, from buildings adjacent to Al-Shifa hospital.
17 November 2023	Hamas releases a video confirming the death of 86-year-old hostage Arye Zalmanovich, claiming he has died due to a heart attack caused by IDF airstrikes.
21 November 2023	Israel releases footage that it says shows hostages being taken into Al-Shifa hospital by armed men. According to Israel, a third hostage, Corporal Noa Marciano, was taken to Al-Shifa hospital and executed there. Hamas had previously claimed that Marciano was killed in an Israeli airstrike on 9 November.
24–30 November 2023	Hamas and Israel agree to a four-day ceasefire in which 50 Israeli hostages would be released for 150 Palestinian prisoners. The ceasefire was extended by three additional days. The hostages to be released during the ceasefire included women and minors. Hamas releases 80 Israeli hostages in exchange for the release of 240 prisoners during the weeklong ceasefire. Separate from the broader hostage release, on 26 November 2023, Hamas releases a dual citizen Russian-Israeli hostage, "as a result of the movement's appreciation for President Putin's positions". Hamas also released 23 Thai hostages and one Filipino hostage during the weeklong ceasefire in a separate agreement between Hamas and the Thai government.: 81 from Israel; 23 from Thailand; 1 from the Philippines
29 November 2023	Hamas reports that members of the Bibas family, a 10-month old, a 4-year-old and their mother were apparently killed by Israeli airstrikes in Gaza. The IDF and Shin Bet announce they have recovered the body of deceased hostage Ophir Sarfati in recent days.
1 December 2023	Four hostages from Nir Oz were announced to have died in captivity.
8 December 2023	Hamas says hostage Sahar Baruch was killed in a failed rescue attempt. On 3 January 2024, the IDF admitted that Baruch was killed during a failed rescue attempt and two Israeli soldiers were wounded while attempting the rescue attempt.
12 December 2023	The IDF recovers the bodies of two hostages in underground tunnels in Jabalia, Gaza: They were: (Israel) Eden Zechariah and Ziv Dado
15 December 2023	Three Israeli hostages are shot dead by the IDF while waving a white-flag in Shuja'iyya, Gaza in a friendly fire incident. The IDF recovers the bodies of three additional hostages in Gaza.: (Israel) Alon Shamriz; (Israel) Yotam Haim; (Israel) Samer Talalka
18 December 2023	Hamas released a video of three elderly Israeli hostages on 18 December.
19 December 2023	Palestinian Islamic Jihad released a video of two Israeli hostages on 19 December.
4 January 2024	Three Israelis that had been previously presumed as missing are announced as held hostage in Gaza. Israel believes 136 hostages are being held in the Gaza Strip. (Note: Includes four hostages taken prior to the 7 October attacks)
15 January 2024	Hamas releases a video showing three Israeli hostages. Hamas claims that two of the hostages were killed in Israeli airstrikes. Israel disputed the claim.
19 January 2024	The Al-Nasser Salah al-Deen Brigades released a video of an Israeli captive who it claimed was killed by an Israeli airstrike in the Gaza Strip.
6 February 2024	According to a confidential assessment conducted by Israeli intelligence officers, it was reported that there were more deceased hostages then previously known, with an additional 20 hostages reportedly deceased.
12 February 2024	The IDF, Shin Bet and special police forces rescue two hostages, who were kidnapped from Kibbutz Nir Yitzhak, from a building in Rafah in southern Gaza, one soldier is reportedly injured and 37 Hamas militants are reportedly killed.
6 April 2024	The IDF announces it has recovered the body of deceased hostage Elad Katzir.
10 April 2024	Hamas tells mediators that it does not have 40 hostages that match the criteria for a ceasefire deal.
17 May 2024	The IDF reports that they have recovered the bodies of three of the hostages, including that of Shani Louk, who were reportedly kidnapped during the attack on the Nova festival. Per the IDF, all three were killed near the site of the attack and their bodies were taken into Gaza and later recovered in a Hamas tunnel.
18 May 2024	It was announced by the IDF that they had also recovered the body of deceased hostage Ron Benjamin, and his body was recovered alongside those announced the day before. Benjamin was 53-years-old and abducted from the Be'eri kibbutz while riding his bike on the day of the attack.
24 May 2024	The IDF reports that they have recovered the bodies of three hostages from a tunnel in Jabalia.
28 May 2024	Saraya Al-Quds released a video of an Israeli hostage.
3 June 2024	The IDF reports the deaths of four hostages, possibly by IDF fire in Khan Yunis.
8 June 2024	Four hostages are successfully rescued by the IDF in an operation in Nuseirat in central Gaza. The four hostages were taken during the Nova music festival massacre. One Israeli officer and dozens of Palestinians are killed in the rescue operation.
22 July 2024	The IDF confirmed the death of Polish-Israeli historian and educator Alex Dancyg, and of Yagev Buchshtav – both abducted from their homes in Kibbutz Nir Oz and Kibbutz Nirim during the 7 October (2023) massacres. Buchshstav's wife – Rimon – was kidnapped along with her husband, but she was released in November 2023 in a hostage deal with Hamas.
24 July 2024	Five bodies of hostages are recovered by the IDF in a tunnel in Khan Younis in southern Gaza.
19–20 August 2024	Six bodies of hostages are recovered by Israeli forces in a Khan Younis tunnel. The bodies had gunshot wounds, likely indicating they were killed by their captors.
27 August 2024	A Negev Bedouin hostage, Farhan Al-Qadi, is rescued by Israeli forces operating in a tunnel in Rafah. Al-Qadi had been left alone and unguarded in a tunnel, and IDF forces did not encounter any resistance from Hamas when they rescued him.
28 August 2024	The remains of an IDF soldier who was killed and abducted on 7 October were recovered from the southern Gaza Strip.
31 August 2024	Six bodies of hostages, including Israeli-American Hersh Goldberg-Polin, are recovered by the IDF in a tunnel in Rafah. According to an autopsy report performed by the Abu Kabir Forensic Institute, the hostages were executed by Hamas from "close range" 2–3 days earlier.
4 December 2024	The remains of Itai Svirsky, taken hostage from kibbutz Be'eri on 7 October 2023, was recovered by the IDF.
8 January 2025	The remains of Yousef and Hamza Zayadni, taken hostage from kibbutz Holit on 7 October 2023, were recovered by the IDF.
19 January 2025	Hours prior to a ceasefire, the IDF announces it had retrieved the remains of Oron Shaul, killed and captured by Hamas in 2014, in a clandestine operation with the Shin Bet over the weekend. Israel and Hamas agree to a three stage ceasefire. Three female hostages are released by Hamas: (Israel) Romi Gonen; (Israel) (United Kingdom) Emily Damari; (Israel) (Romania) Doron Steinbrecher
25 January 2025	Four Israeli women serving in the IDF are released by Hamas into the custody of the Red Cross and returned to Israel: (Israel) Karina Ariev; (Israel) (Bulgaria) Daniella Gilboa; (Israel) Naama Levy; (Israel) Liri Albag
30 January 2025	Three Israeli (one civilian man, one civilian woman and one IDF female soldier) and five Thai hostages are released by Hamas: (Israel) Agam Berger; (Israel) (Germany) Arbel Yehud; (Israel) Gadi Moses; (Thailand) Pongsak Thaenna; (Thailand) Sathian Suwannakham; (Thailand) Watchara Sriaoun; (Thailand) Bannawat Saethao; (Thailand) Surasak Lamnao
1 February 2025	Three Israeli men are released by Hamas: (Israel) (United States) Keith Siegel; (Israel) (France) (Portugal) Ofer Calderon; (Israel) (Argentina) Yarden Bibas
8 February 2025	Three Israeli men are released by Hamas: (Israel) Eli Sharabi; (Israel) Or Levy; (Israel) (Germany) Ohad Ben Ami
15 February 2025	Three Israeli men are released by Hamas: (Israel) (Russia) Alexander (Sasha) Troufanov; (Israel) (United States) Sagui Dekel-Chen; (Israel) (Argentina) Iair Horn
20 February 2025	Hamas returns bodies of three dead Israeli hostages, including two children, along with the body of an unidentified woman incorrectly presented as (Israel) (Argentina) (Germany) Shiri Bibas: (Israel) (Poland) Oded Lifshitz; (Israel) (Argentina) (Germany) Ariel Bibas; (Israel) (Argentina) (Germany) Kfir Bibas
21 February 2025	Hamas returns body of (Israel) (Argentina) (Germany) Shiri Bibas.
22 February 2025	Six Israeli men are released by Hamas, including two who had been kidnapped before the 7 October 2023 attack and held hostage for a decade: (Israel) Eliya Cohen; (Israel) Omer Shem Tov; (Israel) Omer Wenkert; (Israel) (Austria) (Italy) Tal Shoham; (Israel) (Ethiopia) Avera Mengistu; (Israel) Hisham al-Sayed
26 February 2025	The bodies of four dead Israeli hostages are returned by Hamas: (Israel) Shlomo Mansour; (Israel) (France) Ohad Yahalomi; (Israel) Tsachi Idan; (Israel) (Denmark) Itzik Elgarat
12 May 2025	(Israel) (United States) Israeli-American hostage and IDF soldier Edan Alexander is handed over to the Red Cross as a gesture of goodwill prior to US President Donald Trump's visit to the Arabian Peninsula and to facilitate the entrance of humanitarian aid into Gaza. A week later, the Israeli government resumes humanitarian aid into Gaza with reports saying that the aid is in exchange for Alexander's release.
5 June 2025	The IDF recovers the bodies of two dead hostages: (Israel) (United States) Gadi Haggai; (Israel) (United States) (Canada) Judi Weinstein
6 June 2025	The IDF recovers the body of (Thailand) Thai hostage Nattapong Pinta. The announcement came the following day. In the announcement, Israel stated that it believes Nattapong was kidnapped alive and killed in captivity.
11 June 2025	The IDF recovers the bodies of two hostages who were killed on 7 October 2023: (Israel) Aviv Atzili; (Israel) Yair Yaakov
21 June 2025	The IDF recovers the bodies of three hostages who were killed on 7 October 2023, including one IDF soldier: (Israel) Ofra Keidar; (Israel) Staff Sgt. Shay Levinson; (Israel) Jonathan Samerano
29 August 2025	The IDF recovers the bodies of two hostages who were killed on 7 October 2023: (Israel) Idan Shtivi; (Israel) (Hungary) Ilan Weiss
8 October 2025	Israel and Hamas agree on the first stage of the Gaza war peace plan, under which all hostages will be released - first the living, then the dead.
13 October 2025	20 Israeli men, including two IDF soldiers, (Note: Rom Braslavski and Bar Kupershtein were also IDF soldiers, but were on leave when taken captive.) are released by Hamas into the custody of the Red Cross and returned to Israel: (Israel) (Bulgaria) Matan Angrest; (Israel) (Germany) Gali Berman; (Israel) (Germany) Ziv Berman; (Israel) (Colombia) Elkana Bohbot; (Israel) (Germany) Rom Braslavski; (Israel) Nimrod Cohen; (Israel) (Argentina) Ariel Cunio; (Israel) (Argentina) David Cunio; (Israel) Evyatar David; (Israel) Guy Gilboa-Dalal; (Israel) (Russia) (Note: Herkin gained Russian citizenship during his captivity through the effort of his mother, who hoped it would help secure his release.) (Ukraine) Maxim Herkin; (Israel) (Argentina) Eitan Horn; (Israel) Segev Kalfon; (Israel) Bar Kupershtein; (Israel) (Hungary) Omri Miran; (Israel) Eitan Mor; (Israel) Yosef Chaim Ohana; (Israel) (Germany) (Serbia) Alon Ohel; (Israel) Avinatan Or; (Israel) Matan Zangauker; The bodies of four dead Israeli hostages, including one IDF soldier, are also returned by Hamas: (Israel) Guy Illouz; (Israel) Yossi Sharabi; (Nepal) Bipin Joshi; (Israel) (South Africa) Cpt. Daniel Perez
14 October 2025	The bodies of three dead Israeli hostages, including one IDF soldier, are returned by Hamas into the custody of the Red Cross and returned to Israel, along with a fourth body belonging to a Palestinian from the West Bank: (Israel) (Germany) Staff Sgt. Tamir Nimrodi; (Israel) Uriel Baruch; (Israel) Eitan Levy; Hamas claims the fourth body belongs to an Israeli soldier allegedly killed and abducted in May 2024, but the IDF denies the claim. The Israeli broadcaster Kan reports that it belongs to a detained Palestinian prisoner whom the IDF used as a human shield.
15 October 2025	The bodies of two dead Israeli hostages, including one IDF soldier, are returned by Hamas into the custody of the Red Cross and returned to Israel: (Israel) Sgt. Maj. Muhammad Al-Atrash; (Israel) Inbar Haiman
17 October 2025	Hamas returns the body of (Israel) Eliyahu "Churchill" Margalit.
18 October 2025	Hamas returns two bodies to Israel: (Israel) (Argentina) Ronen Engel; (Thailand) Sonthaya Oakkharasri
20 October 2025	Hamas returns the body of (Israel) (Romania) Tal Haimi.
21 October 2025	Hamas returns two bodies to Israel: (Israel) (Germany) Tamir Adar; (Israel) Arie "Zalman" Zalmanowicz
27 October 2025	Hamas returns body parts of (Israel) (France) Ofir Tzarfati, whose partial remains were recovered by the IDF in November 2023, incorrectly presented as the remains of a current hostage.
30 October 2025	Hamas returns two bodies to Israel: (Israel) (Bulgaria) Sahar Baruch; (Israel) (Poland) Amiram Cooper
31 October 2025	Hamas hands over the remains of three unidentified individuals, none of whom are hostages.
2 November 2025	Hamas returns the bodies of three IDF soldiers to Israel: (Israel) Sgt. Oz Daniel; (Israel) Col. Asaf Hamami; (Israel) (United States) Capt. Omer Maxim Neutra
4 November 2025	Hamas returns the body of IDF soldier (United States) (Germany) Staff Sgt. Itay Chen to Israel.
5 November 2025	Hamas returns the body of (Tanzania) Joshua Luito Mollel.
7 November 2025	Palestinian Islamic Jihad and Hamas return the body of (Argentina) Lior Rudaeff to Israel.
9 November 2025	Hamas returns the body of IDF soldier Lt. Hadar Goldin, who was killed and captured in 2014, to Israel.
13 November 2025	Hamas and the PIJ return the body of Meny Godard to Israel.
25 November 2025	Hamas and the PIJ return the body of Dror Or to Israel.
3 December 2025	Hamas and the PIJ return the body of (Thailand) Sudthisak Rinthalak to Israel.
26 January 2026	The IDF recovers the body of (Israel) Master Sgt. Ran Gvili, the last Israeli hostage left in Gaza.

== See also ==
- Outline of the Gaza war
- The Children of 7 October
- Mass detentions in the Gaza war – Includes Palestinian prisoners exchanged for hostages
- Entebbe raid – 1976 IDF operation freeing Israeli hostages in Uganda
- Wadie Haddad – Palestinian militant who organized several hostage-takings in 1960s–70s
- Israeli MIAs – Israel Defense Forces members who are missing in action
