= Montana Tucker =

American dancer, singer, and social media activist (born 1993)

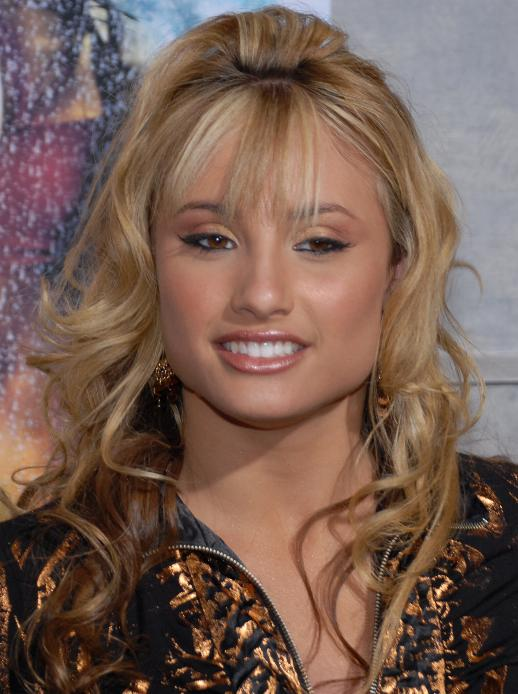
- Tucker in 2008

Background information
- Born: January 18, 1993 (age 33); Boca Raton, Florida, U.S.
- Occupations: Songwriter; Singer; Dancer; Actress
- Years active: 2001–present
- Label: Mr. 305 Inc.
- Website: montanatucker.com

Montana Tucker (born January 18, 1993) is an American dancer, singer, and social media activist. As of 2024, Tucker's online presence reportedly included a following of over 9 million followers on TikTok and 3.1 million followers on Instagram.

== Early life ==
Tucker was born in Boca Raton, Florida. She is Ashkenazi Jewish, and the granddaughter of Lilly and Michael Schmidmayer, both Holocaust survivors from Hungary and Romania. Their stories were documented by the USC Shoah Foundation. Tucker has praised her grandmother, who has been living with Alzheimer's disease for years, stating, "My grandma is a Holocaust survivor. I think that's where I've got my hard work-ethic and the mentality to never give up from." Her grandfather died at the age of 97 in 2019.

As a child, Tucker enjoyed dancing and performing, so she went to one of Darrin Henson's workshops in Orlando, FL. Henson recommended moving to New York City or Los Angeles. Eventually, Tucker's mother and manager Michelle opened up a hip-hop dance company called Pop Stars, where she received training by Dave Scott, Shane Sparks, Wade Robson, among others. Tucker also took singing lessons from Betty Wright.

In 2014, she participated in Birthright Israel, a free ten-day trip to Israel for young Jewish adults between the ages of 18 and 26.

== Career ==
When Tucker was 8, she began modeling and appeared in music videos, television shows including Barney & Friends, E-Venture Kids, with Ariana Grande, and commercials including for Ovaltine, Skechers, BMW and Wendy's. At 11 years old, Tucker won the World Hip Hop Dance Championship. When she was 13, Tucker was a featured backup dancer for Ashanti and Ashlee Simpson. At age 14, Tucker had her first public performance at the 2007 Super Bowl Pre Game.

In 2023, Tucker appeared on the film Holiday Twist where she played the character "Cheryl". She also appeared on the soundtracks for the 2008 film Step Up 2: The Streets and the 2009 film Bring It On: Fight to the Finish.

In June 2026, it was announced that Tucker would be hosting the delegation parade of the 2026 Maccabiah Games.

== Advocacy ==
In June 2022, Tucker visited Auschwitz with her mother to honor her family's legacy and document her experiences in a TikTok series, How To: Never Forget. The series, viewed over seven million times, was later adapted into a documentary, aimed at engaging younger audiences. In April 2023, Tucker was invited to the White House to do an interview with Doug Emhoff. In June 2023, Tucker emceed the 75th Anniversary of Israel reception which was put on by Michael Herzog, the Israeli Ambassador to the United States.

Since the October 7 attacks in 2023, Tucker actively joined efforts advocating for Israel and speaking out against antisemitism and hatred. Tucker has reported losing masses of online followers due to the shift in her content to actively supporting Israel, but argues the need for education to counter antisemitism and ensure the preservation of Holocaust memory.

In November 2023, Tucker addressed nearly 300,000 supporters of Israel at March for Israel.

In 2024, Tucker released a video of her performing with survivors of the Nova music festival massacre, together with the Lilach Friedman's Dance Ensemble. The video was filmed at the site of the massacre.

Tucker produced a documentary titled The Children of October 7 in which she interviewed seven of the young victims of the October 7 attacks. One of the victims interviewed was Eitan Yahalomi, who was abducted by Hamas and released in the 2023 exchange of Israeli hostages for Palestinian prisoners. Another victim interviewed was Rotem Mathias, who was saved from being taken hostage by hiding under his mother's dead body. On 2 December 2024, the documentary which was produced by Asaf Becker, premiered at the Museum of Tolerance in Jerusalem and was attended by President of Israel Isaac Herzog and First Lady Michal Herzog. The documentary was picked up by Paramount+ where it premiered on April 23, 2025, followed by an airing on MTV.

=== 2024 Grammy Awards ===
Tucker made headlines when she wore a dress at the 66th Annual Grammy Awards adorned with a large yellow ribbon with the words “Bring Them Home” embroidered on it, relating to the Israeli hostages being held in Gaza. The dress was designed by Ortal, an Israeli designer based in Los Angeles. Tucker claimed that Grammy's Directors asked her to change because they considered the dress to be political, but she refused to do so.

== Awards ==
Tucker has been recognised with awards from FIDF, IAC, Magen David Adom, and WIZO. Hatzalah honored Tucker for her continued work in helping Israel. Montana received special recognition from New York City Mayor Eric Adams.

== Filmography ==
Year	Title	Role	Notes
2005	Barney: The Land of Make Believe	Serena the Mermaid	
2008	Step Up 2: The Streets	-	Performed on soundtrack
2009	Bring It On: Fight to the Finish	-	Performed on soundtrack
2018–2019	The Bay	Flight Attendant Olivia / Olivia	2 episodes
2023	Holiday Twist	Cheryl	
2025	12 Hours in October		
