= 12 Hours in October =

- Directed by: Danny Abeckaser
- Written by: Kosta Kondilopoulos
- Starring: Hadar Shitrit; Doron Ben-David; Yakov Zada; Montana Tucker; Marina Maxamilia; Hertzel Tobey
- Release date: December 2025
- Running time: 80 minutes
- Countries: United States; Israel
- Language: English

12 Hours in October is a 2025 drama film written by Kosta Kondilopoulos, directed by Danny A. Abeckaser and starring Hadar Shitrit, Doron Ben-David, Yakov Zada, Montana Tucker, Marina Maxamilia and Hertzel Tobey. It is a cinematic dramatization of the October 7 attacks.

== Cast ==
- Hadar Shitrit as Talia
- Doron Ben-David
- Herzl Tobey
- Montana Tucker
- Yaakov Zada Daniel
- Ariel Yagen as Nabil
- Adi Himelbloy
- Marina Maximilian Blumin

== Release ==
After a limited theatrical release in December 2025, the film was released on VOD on January 6, 2026.

== Reception ==
Alan Ng of Film Threat scored the film an 8 out of 10. Erez Dvora of Ynetnews awarded the film one star out of four.
