= Kidnapping of Bipin Joshi =

Gaza war hostage

Bipin Joshi was a Nepali agriculture student who was kidnapped and taken hostage by Hamas and later killed. He was taken during the 7 October 2023 attack in southern Israel.

== Biography ==
Bipin Joshi was a 23-year-old past student of the Far Western University School of Agriculture in Tikapur, Nepal. He enjoyed playing basketball and football and like many agriculture students traveling to Israel, was hoping to make money and start their own enterprise upon returning to Nepal. Joshi has one sister Pushpa and mother Padma.

Joshi was participating in a "Learn and Earn" agricultural study program in Israel, working on farms such as citrus and lemon orchards in Kibbutz Alumim, located near the Gaza border. He had arrived in Israel a month earlier before the Hamas attack on 7 October 2023.

== Abduction ==
Early in the morning on 7 October 2023 red alert sirens and explosions from rockets were heard near the Alumim kibbutz, with the kibbutz's security team activated by notice from the Israeli Defense Forces (IDF) and the area put on lockdown shortly after. About thirty minutes after the alarm was raised Hamas militants arrived at the kibbutz gates and attempted to gain entry, before successfully breaching a gate and opening the main gate for others. The militants accessed the area where the kibbutz housed foreign employees from Nepal and Thailand and killed two and injured five before security made it to the area. In total of the 41 Thai and Nepalese foreign workers at the kibbutz ten Nepali students were killed, six others were injured, Joshi was the only one captured.

Another Nepalese agriculture student stated later that they knew there might be war in Israel but the students had figured that if they stayed in the bunkers that they would be safe. During the attack many students moved to bunkers and after two grenades were thrown into the bunker Joshi reportedly threw back one grenade outside to protect those inside the bunker, although the second exploded. Joshi's friend stated that if both grenades had gone off more people would be injured and credits his life to Joshi, Joshi and others were moved to another bunker during the attack and Joshi was captured in the second bunker. He was later reportedly recorded walking inside al-Shifa hospital in Gaza City on 7 October.

== Efforts to release ==
The Government of Nepal made continuous diplomatic efforts to secure Joshi's release, appealing to nations such as Egypt and Qatar, as well as engaging directly with Israel. In March 2025, Prime Minister KP Sharma Oli personally reached out to Egyptian President Abdel Fattah al-Sisi, seeking Egypt's mediation in the hostage release negotiations. Meanwhile, Joshi's mother and sister have either traveled to Israel or plan to do so, aiming to advocate for his case and meet with Israeli officials, as reported by Ratopati.

In late 2024, the Israeli Ambassador to Nepal, Shmulik Arie Bass, stated that there were indications from Arab sources suggesting Joshi was still alive, though his exact condition and whereabouts remained unknown. Nearly a year later, in October 2025, Joshi's family released a video believed to have been recorded in November 2023, showing him in captivity. In the footage, he identifies himself in English, saying he had come to Israel for the "Learn and Earn" program and was working on a farm

Israeli President Isaac Herzog met with Joshi's family at the Israeli President's residence in Jerusalem in August 2025 along with Nepalese ambassador Dhan Prasad Pandit. His sister Pushpa, argued for his release in March 2025 stating that he was being held as a hostage "in a war that isn't his." in a reference to his nationality.

== Confirmation of death ==
On 13 October 2025, at the beginning of the Gaza peace plan Israel officially informed Nepal that Joshi was "no longer alive." The formal communication was delivered by the IDF to Nepal's Embassy in Israel, according to Nepal Views. The Israeli authorities stated that efforts would be made to recover Joshi's body and, if that proved impossible, to provide a full explanation of how he died. However, Nepal's Foreign Ministry had not yet received or confirmed all details of the report and continued to seek further information through diplomatic channels.

On 14 October 2025, Joshi was one of four deceased hostages whose identities were announced after their bodies were handed over by Hamas militants. The announcement was after the formal identification process by the National Institute of Forensic Medicine in collaboration with the Israeli Police and Military Rabbinate. According to the Israeli government it was determined that Joshi was killed in the early months of the war.

After confirmation of his death, Joshi's family issued a statement through the Hostages and Missing Families Forum expressing their immense pain upon learning the confirmation of his death, praised his strength and courage, and thanking the governments of Israel and Nepal and US President Donald Trump. On 20 October Joshi's body was repatriated back to Nepal and flown from Ben Gurion International Airport in Tel Aviv to the Tribhuvan International Airport in Kathmandu. Nepal's Foreign Ministry stated that his body would be then brought to his hometown of Bhimdattanagar by that evening. Nepal's Prime Minister Sushila Karki paid tribute to Joshi and praised his courage and bravery while calling him a "son of every mother".
