= The Children of October 7 =

2024 American documentary film

- Film poster
- Directed by: Asaf Becker
- Starring: Montana Tucker
- Country of origin: Israel
- Original language: English

Production
- Producers: Eytan Schwartz, Meny Aviram, Mor Tregger, Zameret Alexaneroni, Jonathan Barsade and Rotem Alima
- Cinematography: Sasha Gavrikov
- Editor: Yotam Katzor
- Running time: 35 minutes
- Production company: Kastina Communications

Original release
- Network: Paramount Plus, MTV
- Release: April 23, 2025

The Children of October 7 is a 2024 Israeli documentary film in which dancer and activist Montana Tucker interviews seven of the young victims of the October 7 attacks.

== Synopsis ==
The film opens with Kfir Bibas, the baby Hamas kidnapped on October 7 and subsequently killed, laughing. After a trigger warning, it continues with footage of the attacks juxtaposed with personal photos. Among the victims interviewed is Eitan Yahalomi, who was abducted by Hamas and released in the 2023 exchange of Israeli hostages for Palestinian prisoners. He describes being kidnapped on a motorcycle, beaten by a mob, and forced at gunpoint to watch videos of the terrorists killing people.

Also interviewed are Rotem Mathias, who was saved from being taken hostage by hiding under his mother's dead body; Alona Rousso and Yella Rousso, from Kfar Aza; and Ella Shani of Kibbutz Be'eri.

Amit Cohen of Nir Oz recounts that the same bullet that passed through his father's leg hit his dog.

11-year-old Yael Idan, who saw her sister killed and her father taken hostage from Kibbutz Nahal Oz, describes the events while the film shows footage from a video that Hamas members livestreamed on Facebook.

The children's ages range from 11 to 17.

== Production ==
Tucker, the granddaughter of Holocaust survivors, was approached by an Israeli film company years after Tucker's work on a Holocaust docuseries. Tucker was aware of Holocaust denial and wanted to contribute to the historical record to counter October 7 denial. She compared the two scenarios by noting the children lost "their families, their homes, and their innocence in a single morning". Asaf Becker produced the film. A psychologist was on set at all times.

After Tucker and CBS vice president of communications Andrea Ballas met at an event, Ballas brought the film to Shari Redstone's attention. Redstone noted her interest in informing and educating the public about the horrors of the October 7 attack on Israel and the "aftermath for thousands of children who will forever suffer from the impact of that day". The film was picked up by Paramount+, where it premiered on April 23, 2025, followed by an airing on MTV.

== Critical and community reception ==
On December 2, 2024, the documentary premiered at the Museum of Tolerance in Jerusalem and was attended by Israel's President Isaac Herzog and First Lady Michal Herzog. The US premiere at the Paley Center for Media in April 2025 was attended by Jason Isaacs and Emma Hewitt, Gloria Gaynor, Nancy Spielberg, Elie Honig, and Noa Argamani. Danielle Solzman called the film "essential viewing".
