= Israeli hostage deal protests =

Israeli anti-government protests

- Part of Gaza war protests in Israel
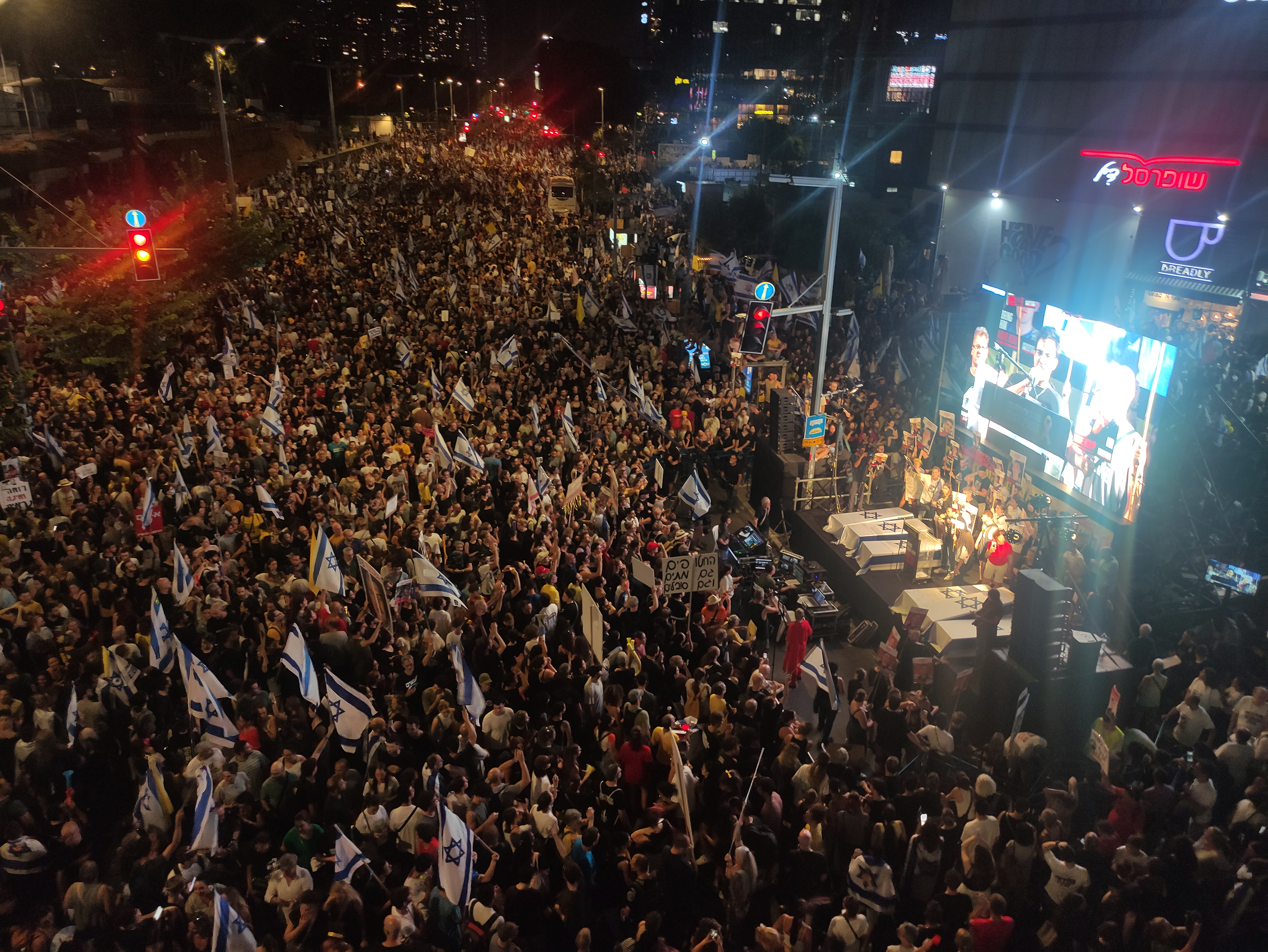
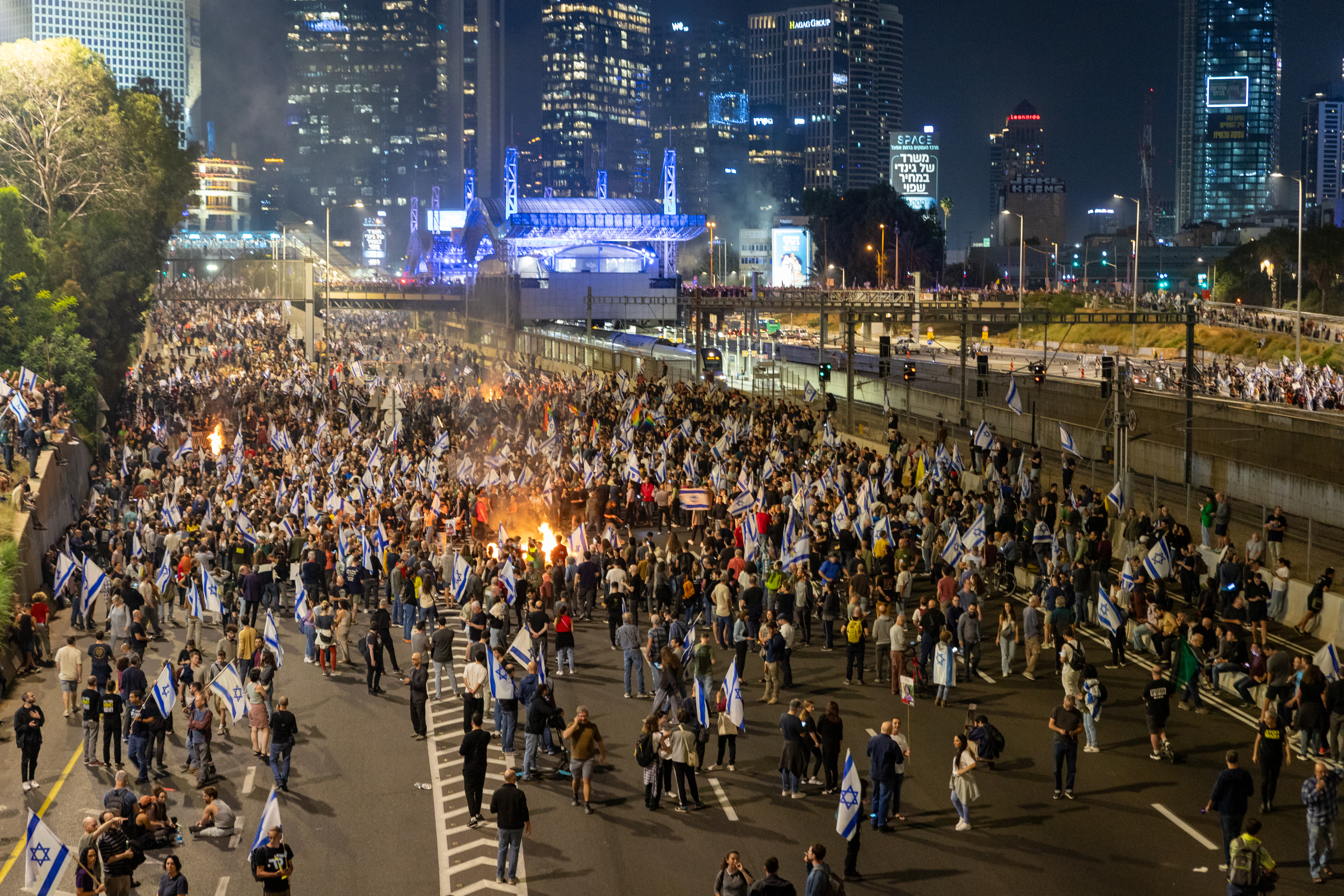
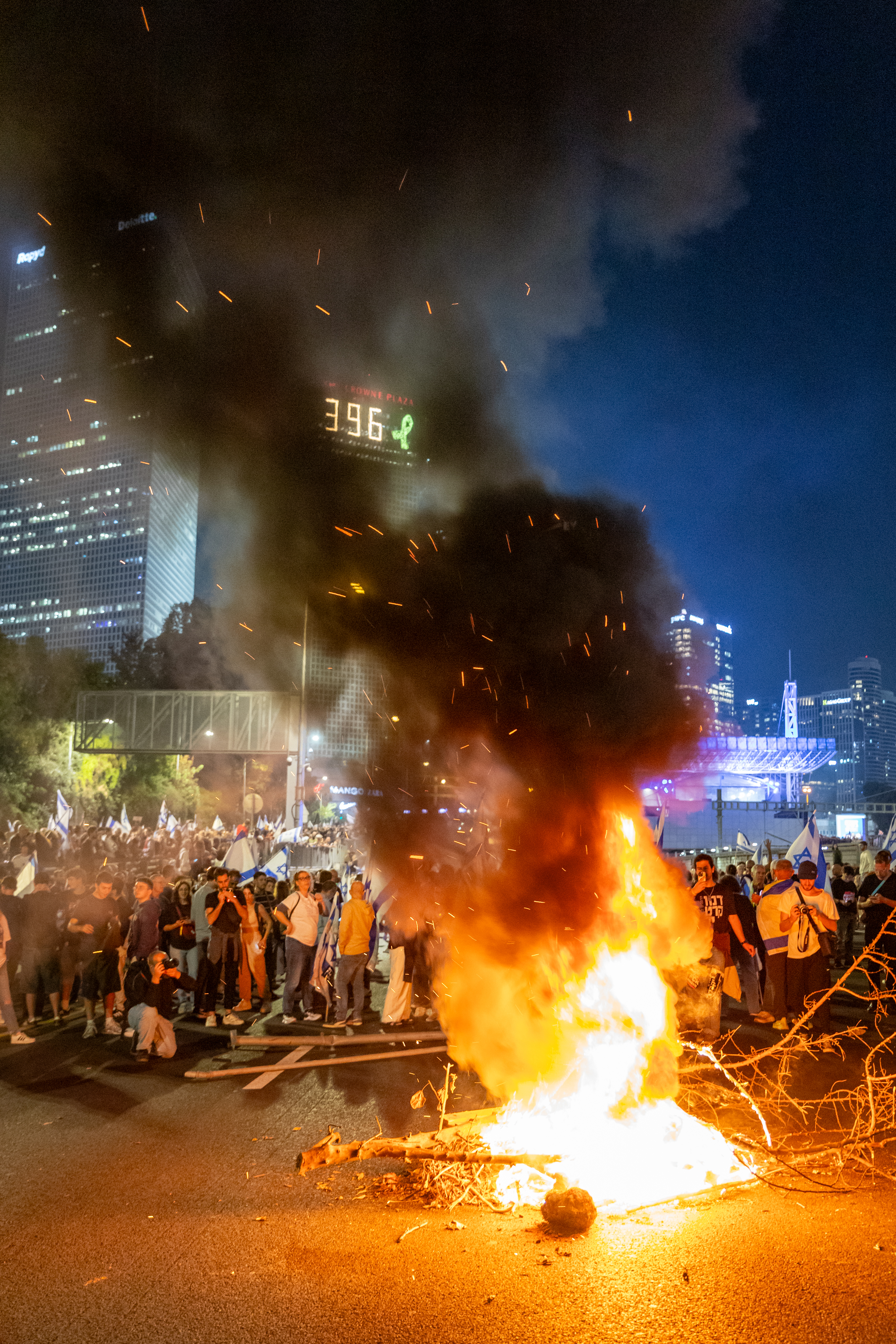
- Top to bottom, left to right: September 2024 Israel hostage deal protests; Demonstration against the dismissal of defense minister Yoav Gallant; Israeli protesters light a bonfire on Ayalon highway
- Date: November 2023 – January 2026
- Location: Israel, mainly: HaKirya; Kaplan Interchange; Hostages Square; Jerusalem; Knesset building; Beit Aghion
- Caused by: Refusal of Benjamin Netanyahu to announce a ceasefire and prisoner exchange; Proposed Israeli resettlement of the Gaza Strip; Gaza Strip famine
- Methods: Demonstrations, civil disobedience, civil resistance, online activism, riots, hunger strikes
- Result: End of Gaza war hostage crisis: Last hostage body recovered in January 2026; Multilateral agreement between Israel and Hamas

Parties
Protesters (anti-government, pro-hostage deal)
- Hostages and Missing Families Forum
- Kaplan Force
- We Are All Hostages
- Black Flag
- Brothers in Arms
- Standing Together
- UnXeptable
- Hofshi Beartzenu (Note: translation: "free in our homeland", a verse from the Israeli national anthem, Hatikvah)
- Women Wage Peace
- Movement for Quality Government in Israel
Opposition of Israel
- The Democrats
- Yesh Atid
- Einav Zangauker
- Yair Golan
- Gilad Kariv
- Naama Lazimi
- Gonen Ben Itzhak
- Yair Lapid
Cabinet of Israel
- Likud
- Otzma Yehudit
- Religious Zionist Party
- United Torah Judaism
- Shas
Supported by:
Counter-protesters (pro-government)
- Benjamin Netanyahu
- Itamar Ben-Gvir

Casualties
- Injuries: 35+ protesters (2 critically); 15 police officers
- Arrested: 1,289+
- Detained: 4

A series of demonstrations, instances of civil disorder, and riots took place in Israel between late 2023 and early 2026 against Prime Minister Benjamin Netanyahu and his government, primarily in response to their handling of the Gaza war and the hostage crisis. The protests aimed to pressure Netanyahu to accept a ceasefire and reach a hostage deal. The protests began sporadically at the onset of the war and later grew significantly in size and intensity, culminating in massive gatherings across various Israeli cities.

On 1 September 2024, following the discovery of six hostages killed in the Gaza Strip, protest organizations declared a nationwide strike and day of demonstrations, with more than 500,000 people participating across Israel and abroad to demand a hostage deal. A subsequent strike was announced on 17 August 2025, drawing hundreds of thousands of demonstrators.

== Background ==
The earliest rounds of protests against Netanyahu started between 2020 and 2021, following attempts to delay his trial. These protests were colloquially called the "Black Flag Protests" and later the "Balfour Protests" (named after the official residence of the Prime Minister, which is on the corner of Balfour Street). The next round of protests came between January and October 2023 in response to the government's push for a wide-ranging judicial reform, aimed to change the makeup of the Judicial Selection Committee. This round of protests aimed to pressure Netanyahu to agree to a hostage deal and resign; the protesters consider Netanyahu a major factor in Israel's political crises in recent years, culminating in the October 7 attacks in 2023 and the ensuing Gaza war.

== Protests ==
According to ACLED, as of 19 December 2024, a total of 1,667 protests have taken place in Israel since October 2023. The majority of these demonstrations have called for the release of hostages and the resignation of the government. At least ten of these protests had more than 100,000 participants.

=== 2023 ===
On 11 November 2023, thousands of Israelis rallied in Tel Aviv to demand the release of the hostages.

On 18 November 2023, Tens of thousands of Israelis, including families of Gaza captives, completed a five-day march from Tel Aviv to Jerusalem, demanding the Israeli government prioritize the hostage deal. Hours after the march, Netanyahu said: "We walk with you, I walk with you. All of Israel walks by your side".

On 25 November 2023, approximately 100,000 people gathered at Hostage Square in Tel Aviv to mark "50 Days of Hell" since the Hamas-led attack on Israel.

=== 2024 ===
On 28 January 2024, police arrested several protesters in Kaplan Interchange in Tel Aviv, while hundreds were dispersed by force.

On 2 April 2024, a protest outside Netanyahu's residence turned into clashes with police. Five people were arrested and one officer was injured in the melee.

On 6 April 2024, during an anti-government rally in Tel Aviv, a driver deliberately accelerated into a crowd of protesters, injuring five.

On 18 June 2024, a protest took place on Gaza Street in Jerusalem near Netanyahu's residence. It soon turned into riots; three people were injured and nine were arrested.

On 27 June 2024, the protest organizers announced "civil strike day", blocking Highway 4 and Ayalon Highway, as well as other routes in Israel, while lighting fires.

On 20 July 2024, thousands of protesters rallied in Tel Aviv, demanding that Netanyahu stay in Israel to continue talks with Hamas in order to reach a hostage deal. Right-wing counter protesters threw stones at them and minor clashes occurred.

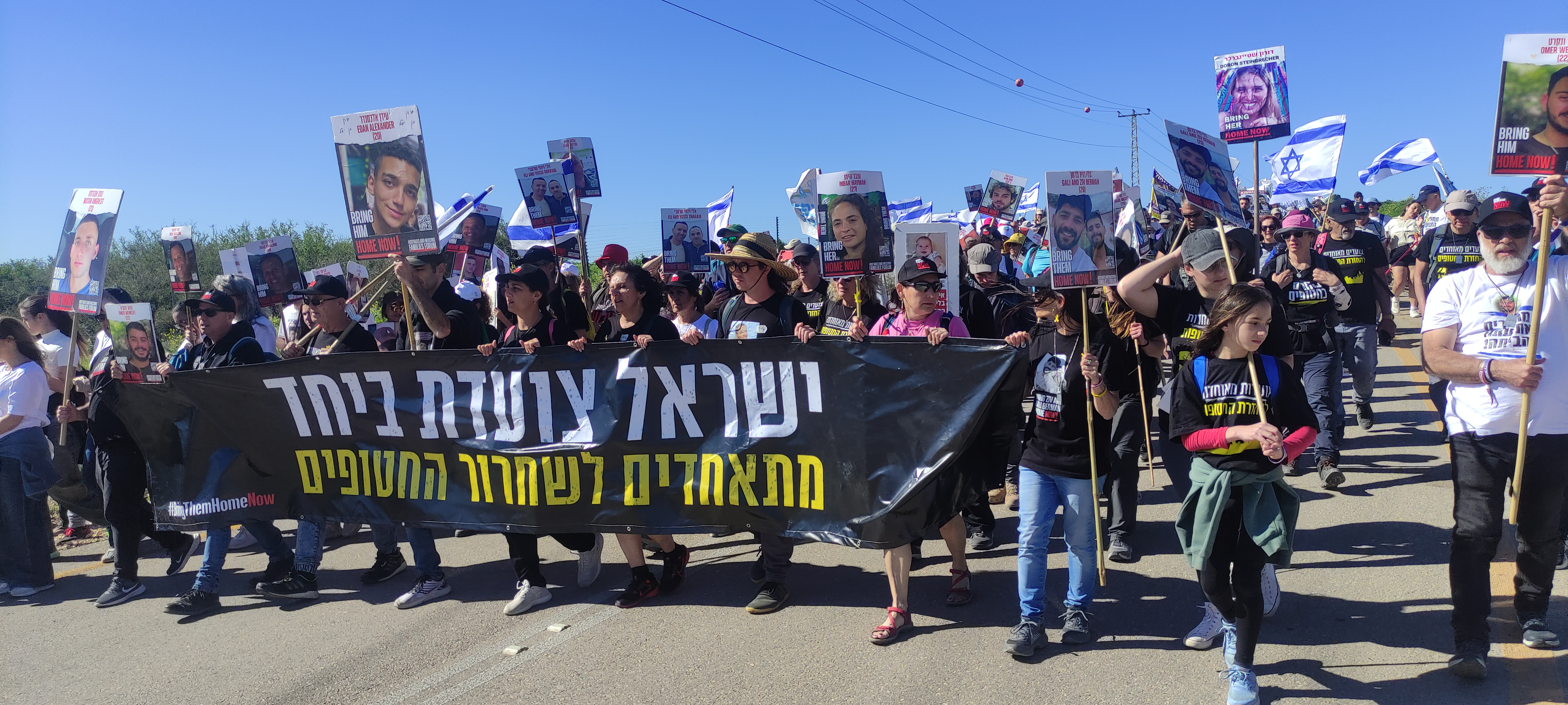
Israel March Together protest march from Re'im to Jerusalem - March 2024

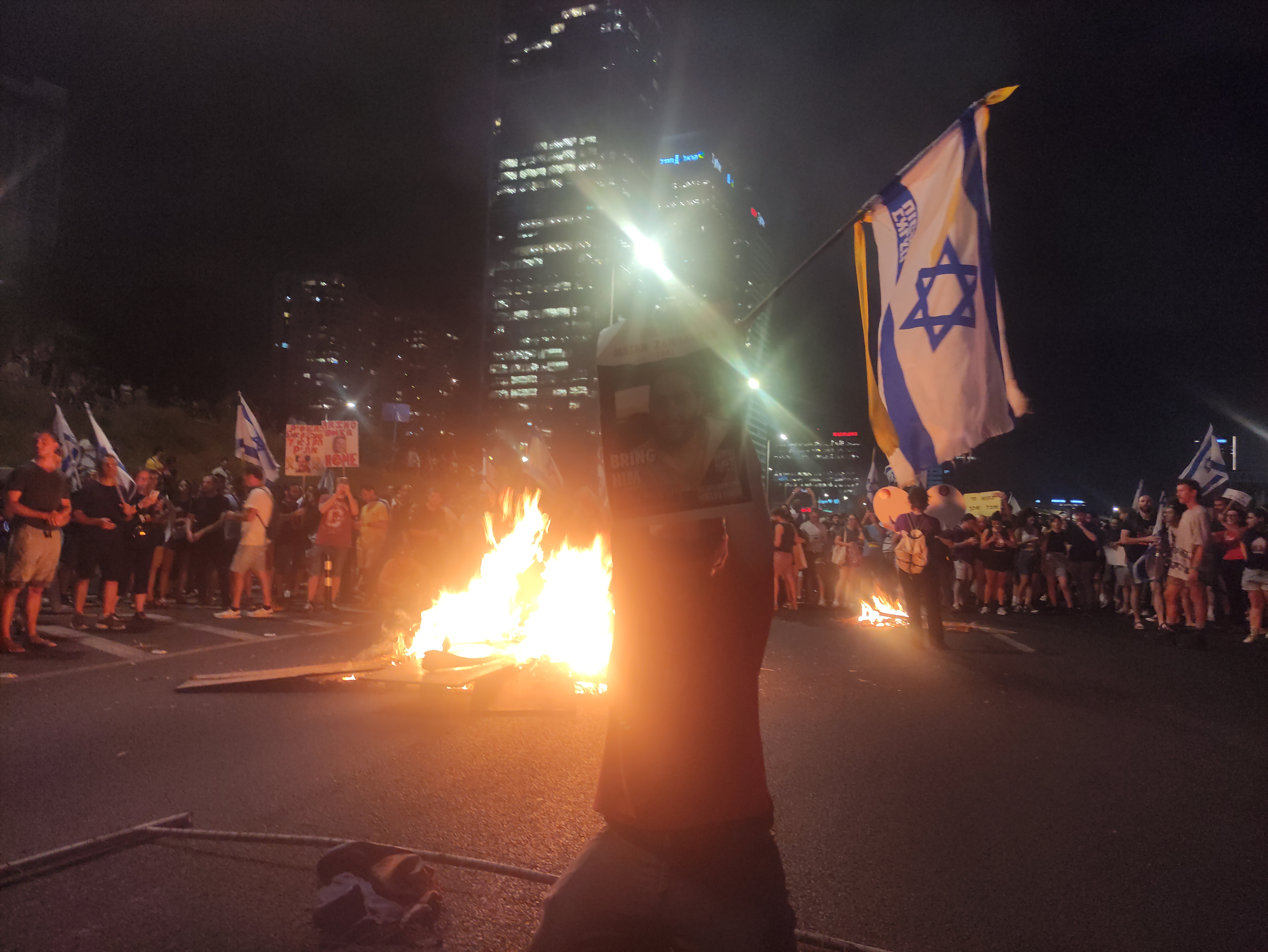
A protester holds a poster of a hostage held in Gaza near a bonfire on the Ayalon Highway.

On 21 July 2024, protesters blocked Ben Gurion Airport, ahead of Netanyahu's departure for a meeting in the United States, and chanted: "No deal, no flight".

On 10 August 2024, thousands of Israelis joined weekly anti-government protests demanding a hostage deal. Protesters were threatened with arrest in Hadera.

On 17 August 2024, tens of thousands around Israel joined weekly anti-government protests, calling for a deal to release the hostages and the resignation of the government. In Ness Ziona, the grandfather of hostage Naama Levy addressed a demonstration.

On 24 August 2024, thousands of Israelis joined weekly anti-government protests, demanding a hostage deal and the resignation of the government. Israeli police arrested three demonstrators in Jerusalem.

On 31 August 2024, families of hostages and many others protested in Tel Aviv and across Israel, leading to clashes with police. Natalie Atedgi, sister of hostage Matan Zangauker, was hospitalized after getting injured by a mounted police officer. Some blocked Ayalon highway for a short time, and were confronted by right-wing activists.

On 7 October 2024, Israelis protested nationwide against Netanyahu, marking one year since the Hamas-led attack on Israel. Some protesters set off a siren outside Beit Aghion, Netanyahu's official residence in Jerusalem. Thousands more formed human chains in over 70 locations. At the same time, a demonstration calling for the release of hostages was held in front of the Begin Gate at the Kirya in Tel Aviv.

On 22 October 2024, protests erupted in Tel Aviv during U.S. Secretary of State Antony Blinken's visit to Israel. Protesters gathered beneath the hotel where Blinken was staying and held signs against Netanyahu and for a hostage deal.

On 5 November 2024, Netanyahu fired defense minister Yoav Gallant. Following his dismissal, the Israeli opposition called for people to protest across Israel. Protesters blocked the main road in Tel Aviv and also set fires around the area. Protesters also gathered in Jerusalem and clashed in front of Netanyahu's residence. The protesters chanted the 2023 Israeli judicial reform protests' motto "Democracy or Revolution".

Throughout December 2024, families held demonstrations against Netanyahu during the trial against him for corruption.

On 27 December 2024, protest movements called for civil disobedience across Israel, urging sit-ins, work strikes, and school boycotts.

On 28 December 2024, tens of thousands of Israelis protested in 52 different locations across the country, urging the government to stop the war and agree to the hostage deal.

==== National strike ====
On 1 September 2024, the trade union Histadrut announced a one-day general strike to be held on the following day in protest of six dead hostages recovered from Gaza. The largest protests since the 2023 Hamas-led attack on Israel took place on the same day, with 300,000 protesting in Tel Aviv and 200,000 in additional parts of Israel, according to Hostages and Missing Families Forum. MK Naama Lazimi was injured when police threw stun grenades into Ayalon highway. A total of 34 protesters were arrested, but courts released 18 of them without further punishment. At least 4 were injured.

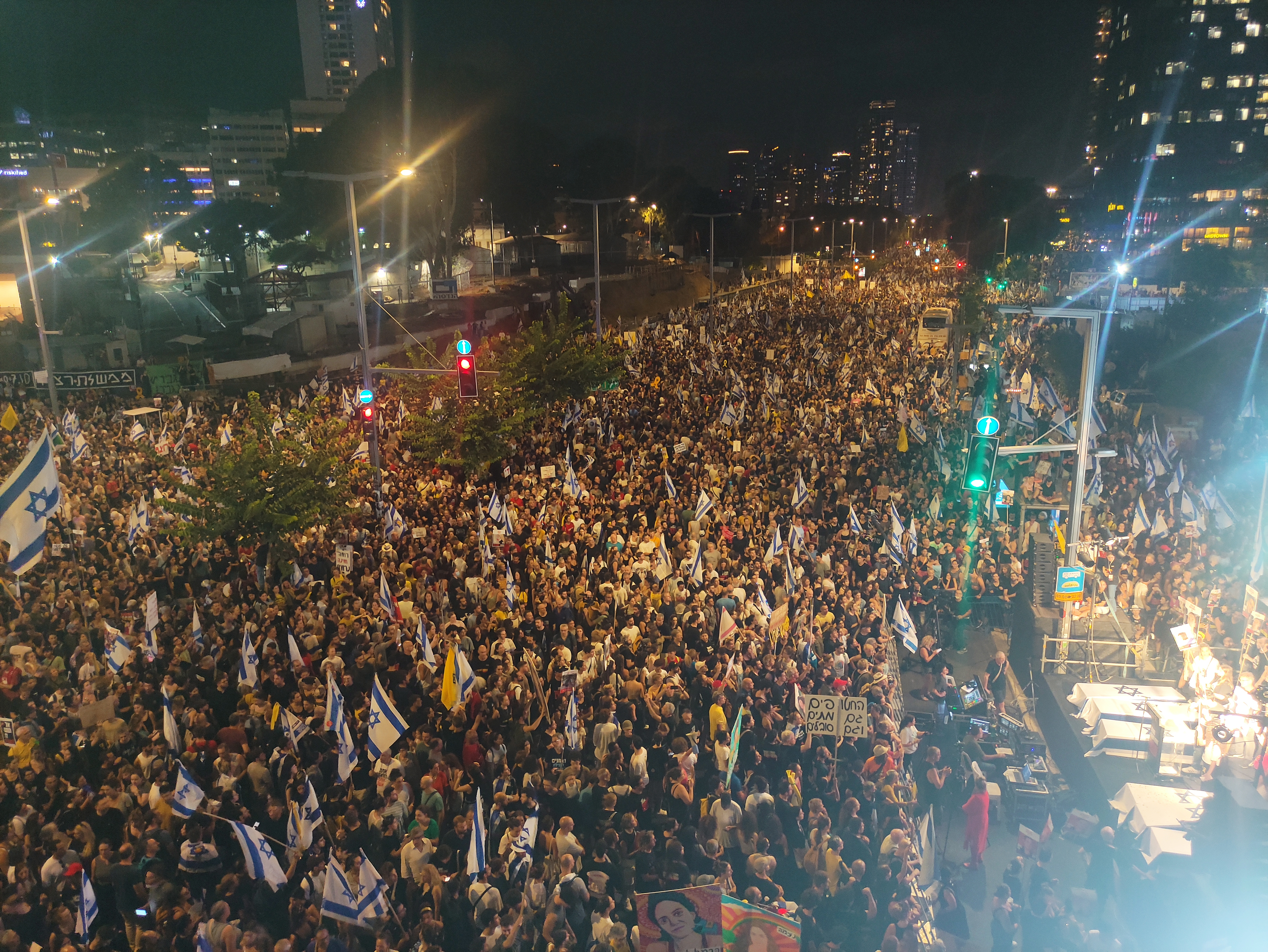
"Stopping The State" protest, Tel Aviv

The Israel Business Forum, which represents around 200 of the country's biggest companies, said workers "would be allowed to join the strike." The Arab citizens of Israel joined the strike. The planned strike started officially on 2 September at 6 AM and was scheduled to last until evening, but a petition against it was filed at a labour court, which demanded to end the strike earlier than originally planned. At least 13 were arrested for blocking Ayalon highway.

On 2 September 2024, tens of thousands of Israelis protested for the second "Day of Rage". In Tel Aviv, protesters marched to the Metzudat Ze'ev (Likud HQ). In Jerusalem, protesters broke through barriers near Netanyahu's residence and clashes occurred with the police, who forcefully arrested several. Netanyahu's speech about the Philadelphi Corridor was met with mixed reactions from Israeli politicians and public opinion.

On 3 September 2024, thousands of Israelis protested for the third "Day of Rage". Protesters accused Netanyahu of "thwarting" a deal to retain control of Philadelphi Corridor. 1,000 people gathered in the city of Rehovot in a show of support for the family of abducted soldier Nimrod Cohen. In Jerusalem, protesters lined the streets around Paris Square. Some also gathered outside the homes of Justice Minister Yariv Levin and Foreign Minister Israel Katz.

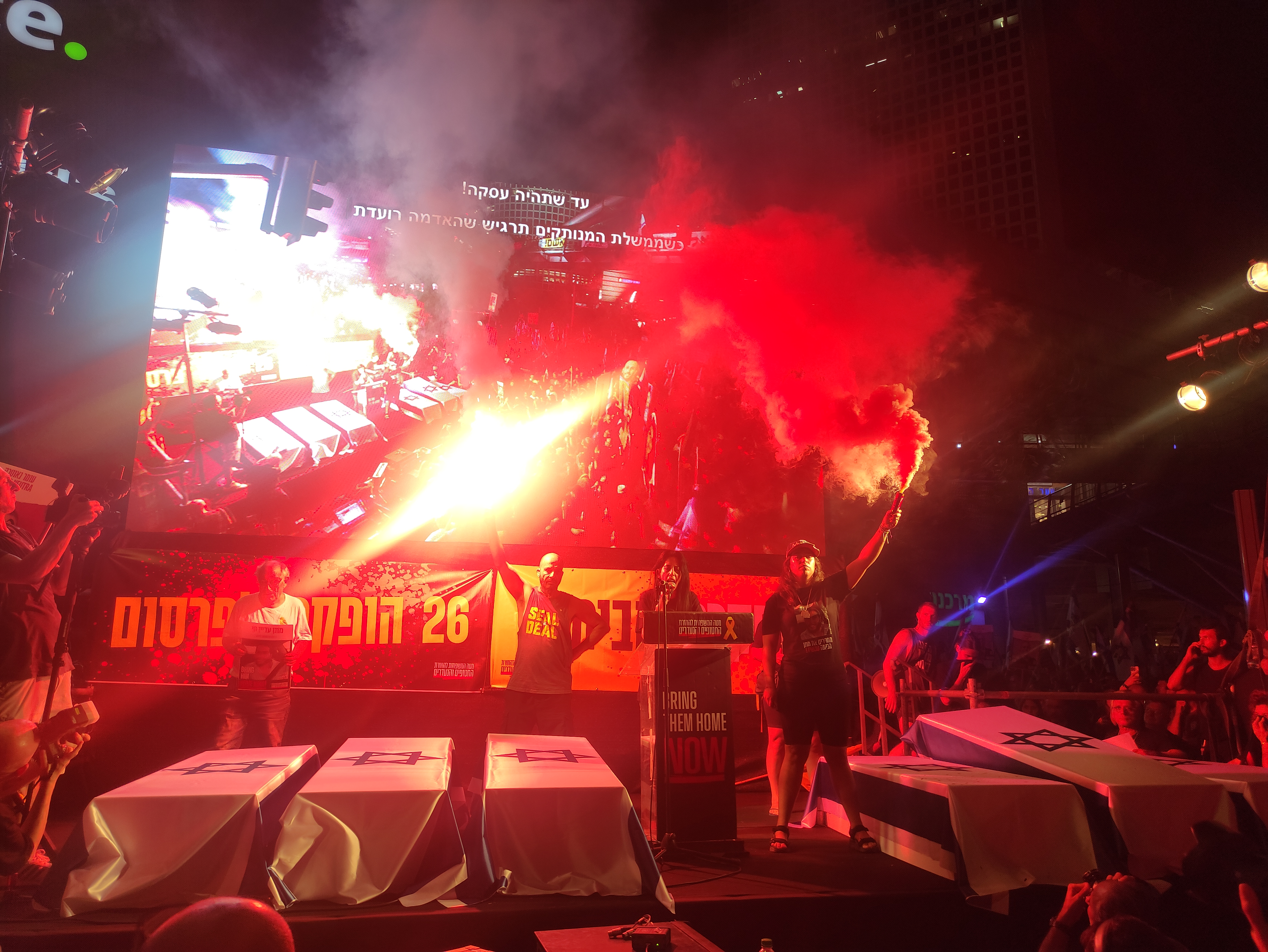
Protesters light a smoke torch, Tel Aviv, 1st September 2024

On 4 September 2024, thousands of Israelis protested for the fourth "Day of Rage". Demonstrators gathered in front of the homes of the Ministers Israel Katz, Shlomo Karhi, Yoav Kish, Ron Dermer, and some others across the country. The main protest took place outside the Begin Gate of the Kirya Base in Tel Aviv. Clashes occurred with the police. Protesters also blocked Highway 4.

On 7 September 2024, hundreds of thousands of Israelis protested in 95 different locations across Israel. Organizers estimate some 400,000 at a Tel Aviv rally. Thousands also demonstrated in Beersheba, Haifa, and Jerusalem. Dozens demonstrated outside the District Court of Tel Aviv after a protester was arrested and imprisoned at Neve Tirtza. Hundreds demonstrated at Kibbutz HaOgen, on Highway 4, and on Pardes Hanna-Karkur. Protesters blocked Ayalon Highway for a short period of time. Five protesters were arrested in Tel Aviv, and three were injured.

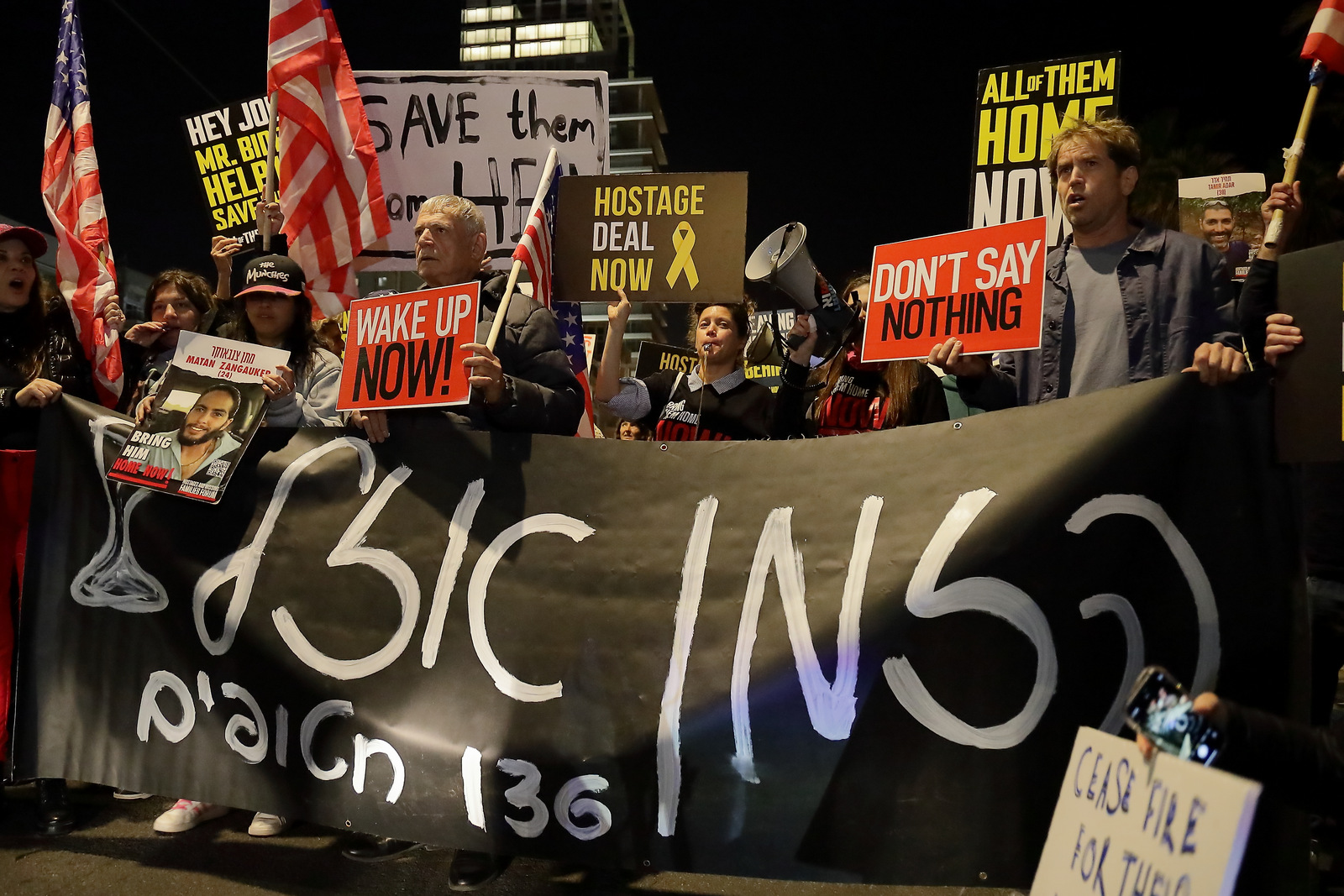
Protesters hold a sign saying "Time is up, 136 hostages" (Hebrew: הזמן אזל, 136 חטופים)

On 14 September 2024, 100,000 Israelis protested in 67 locations across Israel, including Tel Aviv, Haifa, Jerusalem, and Caesarea, next to Prime Minister Netanyahu's private residence. In Tel Aviv, thousands gathered outside the IDF headquarters, demanding a hostage deal. During the protests, the family of hostage Matan Angrest released a recording of him from captivity. Protesters later gathered near the Halacha Bridge and burned tires. Fifteen protesters were arrested in Tel Aviv, and one was arrested in Jerusalem. Small skirmishes broke out between protesters and police in both Tel Aviv and Jerusalem. Israeli politician and a former member of the Knesset for the Labor Party, Ami Ayalon, said: "Non-violent civil disobedience is the order of the day, it's our duty".

On 21 September 2024, tens of thousands of Israelis protested in 91 locations across Israel, including Tel Aviv, Haifa, Jerusalem, Rehovot and HaOgen junction. Protesters also gathered outside the home of Israeli president Isaac Herzog. Yehuda Cohen, father of hostage Nimrod Cohen, asked the international community to pressure Netanyahu ahead of the rally taking place in Tel Aviv. Protesters accompanied chairman of Foreign Affairs and Defense Committee, Yuli Edelstein, on the walk to his synagogue, a week after women were arrested for distributing hostage flyers there. The Hostages and Missing Families Forum announced that "only an unprecedented, widespread and powerful public struggle will bring them back".

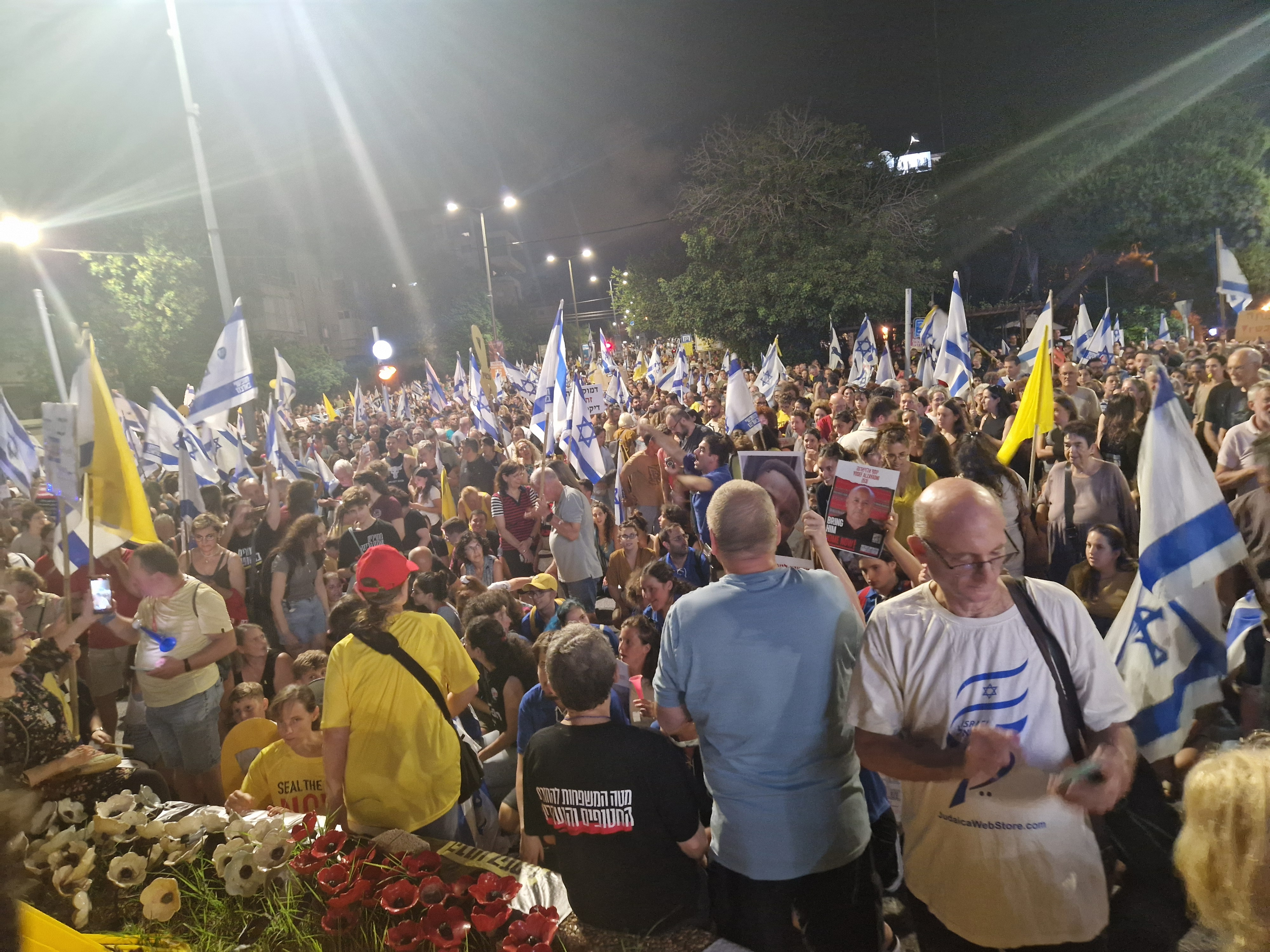
Protests in Haifa, September 1, 2024

According to CNN, prime minister Benjamin Netanyahu was "worried" about the protests. On 2 September, Netanyahu issued a rare apology directed at the families of the six deceased hostages, but continued that he would not stop the use of military force in the Philadelphi Corridor. He also claimed to be working continuously in an effort to bring the remaining hostages back to Israel, but that if Israel caved now it would send a message that Hamas would just need to kill remaining hostages for leverage. On 2 September, while speaking with reporters US President Joe Biden blamed both Netanyahu and Hamas for the absence of a hostage deal before a meeting with members of his negotiating team.

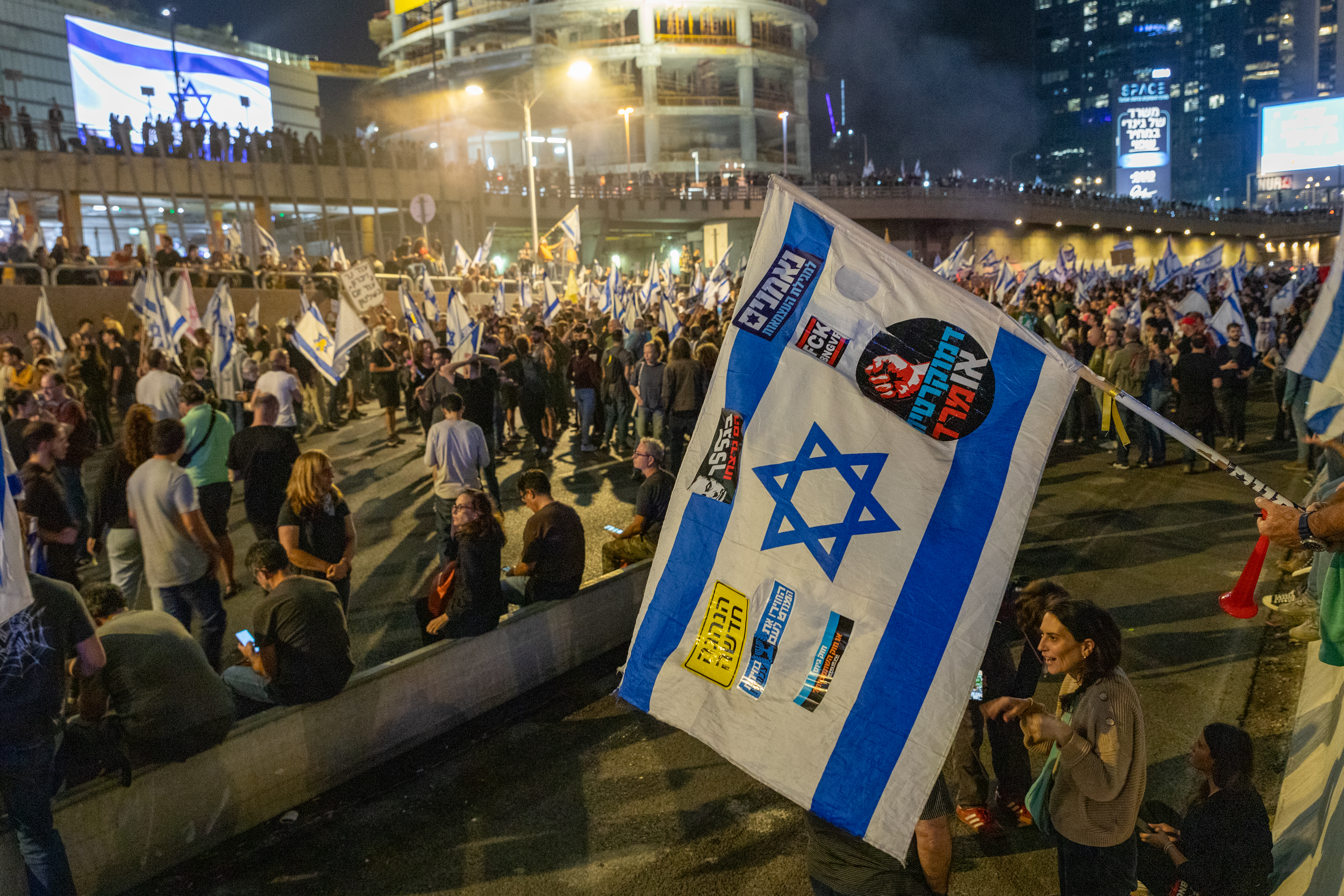
An Israeli flag with stickers that read: 'Democracy or Revolution,' 'New Leadership,' and 'Because of you, they were murdered' (referring to Netanyahu)

=== 2025 ===
On 1 January 2025, relatives of the Gaza hostages blocked Ayalon Highway, lighting torches and a large Hanukkah menorah, calling for a hostage deal and a ceasefire.

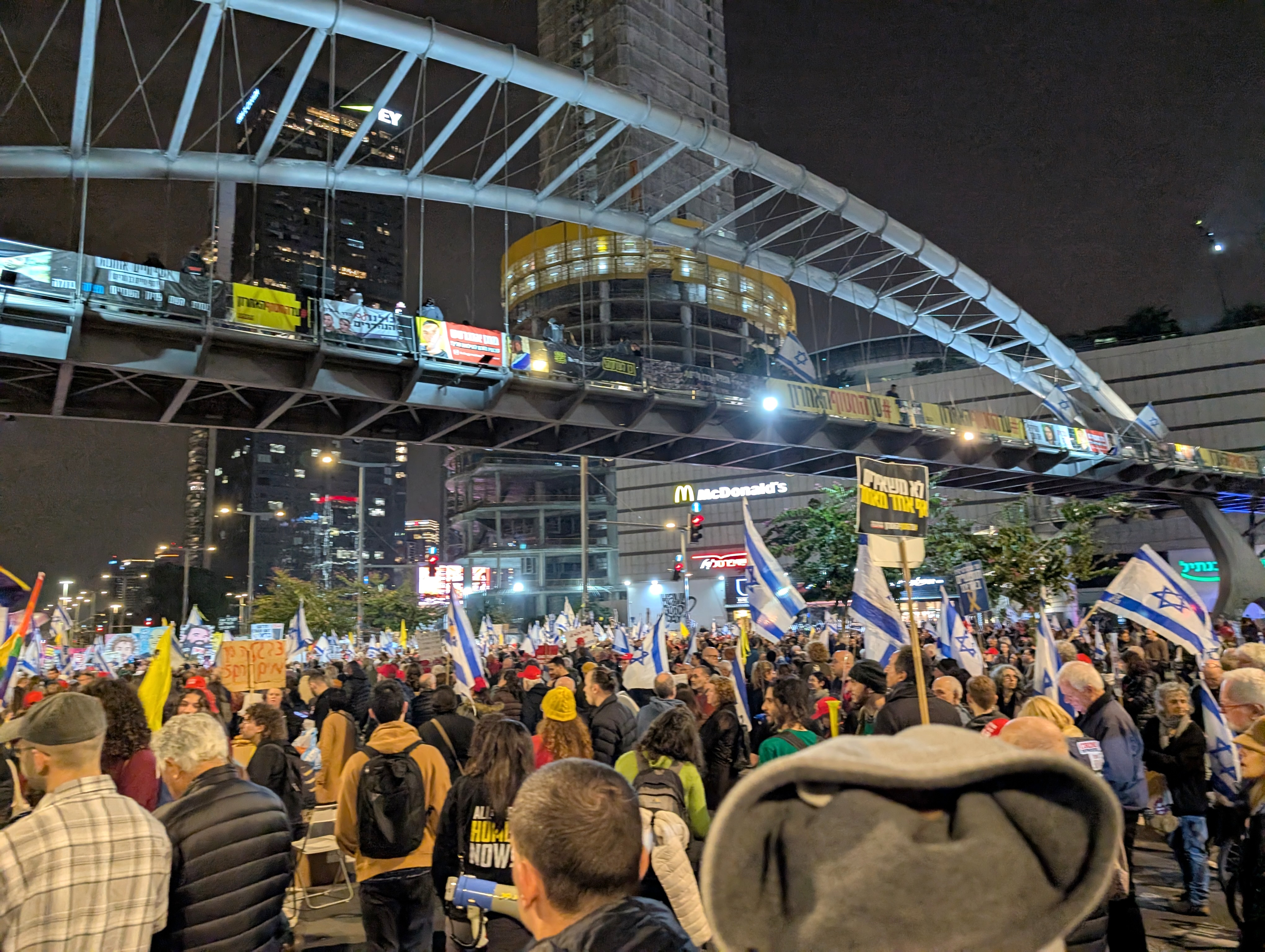
Protesters rallying for hostages, 15 February 2025

On 11 February 2025, protesters block Tel Aviv highway to mark the 24th birthday of hostage Alon Ohel.

On 15 February 2025, about a thousand people gathered in front of the Begin Road entrance to the IDF headquarters in Tel Aviv.

On 8 March 2025, hostage deal activists set up protest camp outside IDF headquarters, as part of what some hostages' families call "Operation Kirya Cordon" (מבצע עוטף קריה).

The publication of the Qatari connection affair (also known as 'Qatargate') at the same month, led to intense anti-Netanyahu protests in Jerusalem. These were partly related to the judicial reform protests but were primarily led by the families of hostages.

On 5 April 2025, thousands took to the streets with the banner "Deal Now!", with smaller demonstrations taking place in other parts of the country. The protesters demanded ceasefire and hostage deal.

On 20 April 2025, several thousands rallied in Tel Aviv and demanded a deal "even at the cost of a long ceasefire" while the holiday of Passover took place.

On 27 April 2025, thousands took to the streets in Tel Aviv, Jerusalem, Haifa and other cities across the country. Ex-Shin Bet chief, Ami Ayalon, called for "nonviolent revolt".

On 28 May 2025, thousands of protesters gathered throughout the country to mark 600 days of war and hostage crisis, including the country's major cities and across university campuses. There were rallies where released hostages recounted their stories while in captivity and families of remaining hostages called for their release.

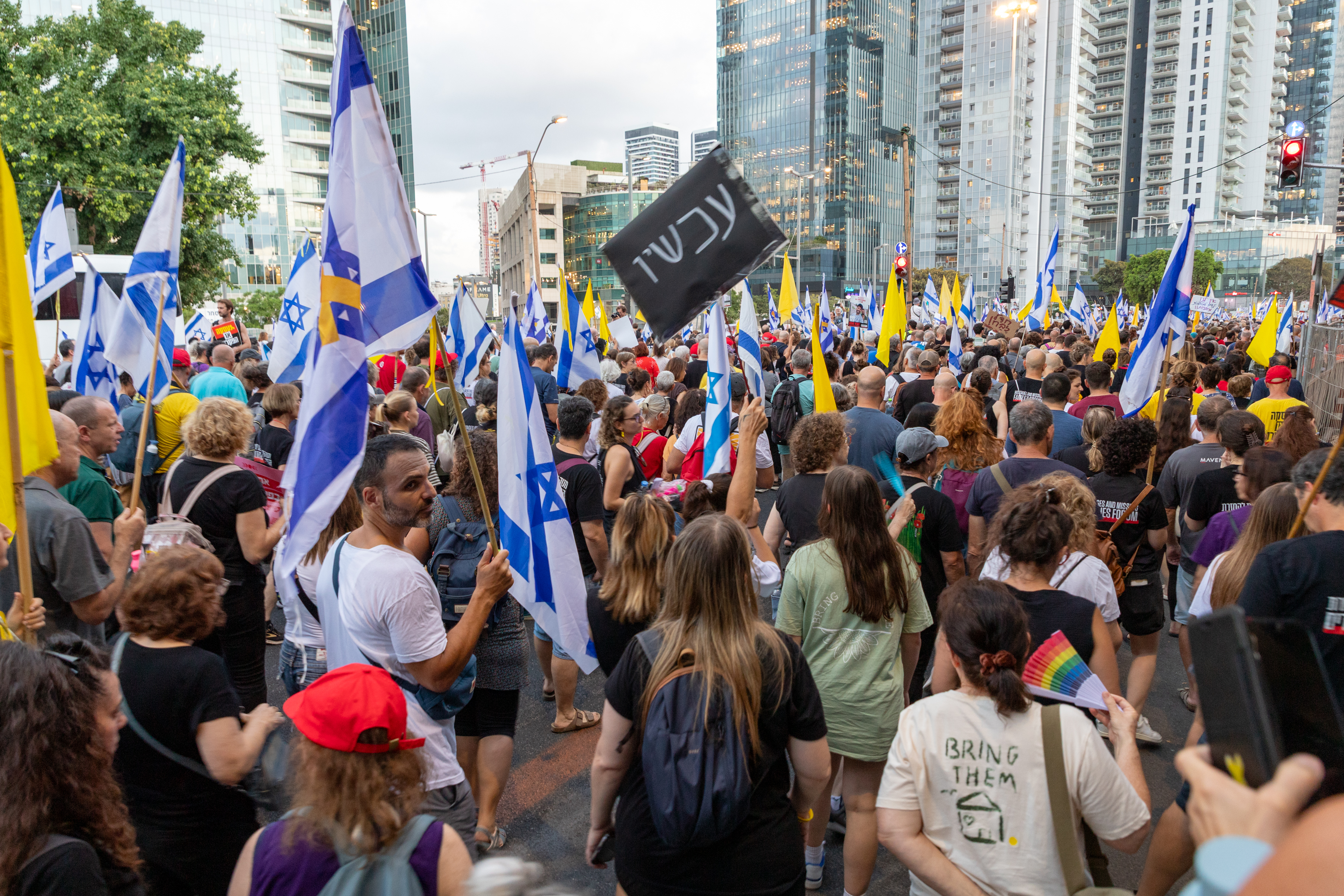
Demonstrators in Tel Aviv on August 17, calling for an end to the war and the return of the hostages

That evening, another significant protest unfolded at Metzudat Ze'ev, the Likud party headquarters in Tel Aviv. Dozens of demonstrators breached the building, reaching the 11th floor where Prime Minister Benjamin Netanyahu's office is located, and chained themselves to staircase railings. They demanded a ceasefire and a stop to the war, along with a call for an hostage deal.

On 31 May, right before Shavuot, Israelis held rallies nationwide to demand a ceasefire and hostage release deal amidst diplomatic efforts from the United States to reach a ceasefire between Israel and Hamas.

Throughout the start of August 2025, tens of thousands of Israelis demonstrated in multiple locations across the country. 13 people arrested at Tel Aviv, and a water cannon was deployed.

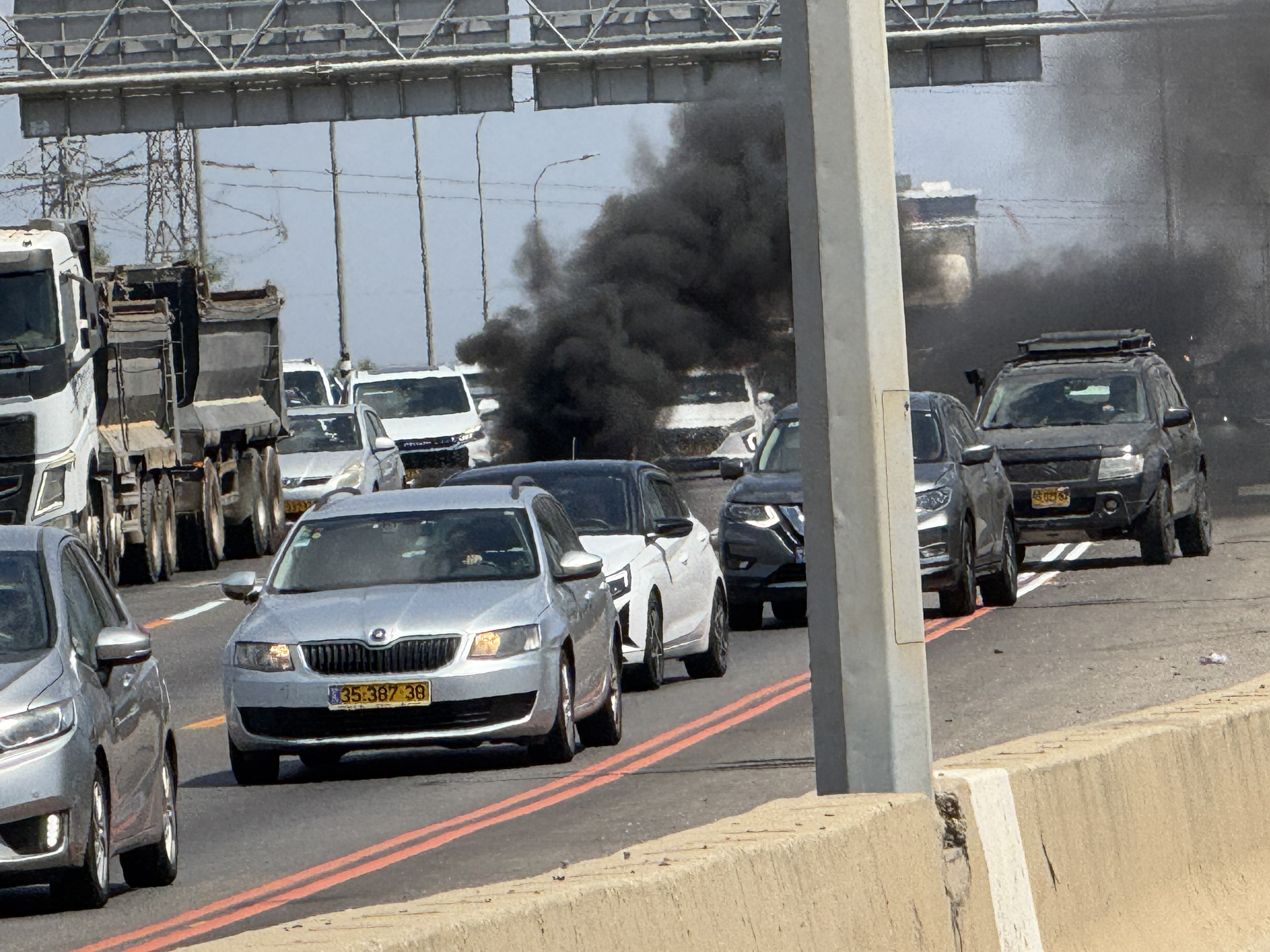
Tires burn in a blockade on Highway 4

On 6 August 2025, hundreds of hostage families joined the protests, calling to halt IDF's Gaza expansion plans.

==== Second strike ====
On 17th August 2025, hostage families announced a strike amid ongoing frustration over the war in Gaza, Proposed Israeli resettlement of the Gaza Strip and reports of widespread famine. Hundreds of thousands demonstrated across the country, calling on Netanyahu to pursue a comprehensive hostage deal and end the Gaza war. At least 38 protesters were arrested. Netanyahu claimed that the protests were "hardening Hamas's position and delaying the release of our hostages".

On 26th August 2025, tens of thousands of Israelis went on a "day of disruption", calling for an end to the war in Gaza and a comprehensive hostage deal. Some major routes were blocked with torched tires and demonstrations occurred in over 140 locations, including Tel Aviv, Haifa, Jerusalem and near Ben Gurion Airport. Gadi Eisenkot, former observer of the Israeli war cabinet, participated in the protest.

== Hunger strike ==
Dr. Avi Ofer went on a hunger strike for 35 days, from 4 May to 4 June 2024, calling for the release of the hostages. Other protesters joined his hunger strike as well; some reports state that 200 Israelis participated in some form of hunger strike during this 35 day period.

On 18 September 2024, 14 activists went on a hunger strike, initiated by Israeli anti-war activist Orna Shimoni, aged 83. David Agmon, who served as the bureau chief for Netanyahu, also joined the hunger strike. The hunger strikers frequently gather outside the Knesset, with some even setting up protest camps there.

On 5 October 2024, the number of hunger strikers grew to 18. In the same month, it was reported that 15 doctors had joined the hunger strike.

== Movements ==
=== Hostages and Missing Families Forum ===
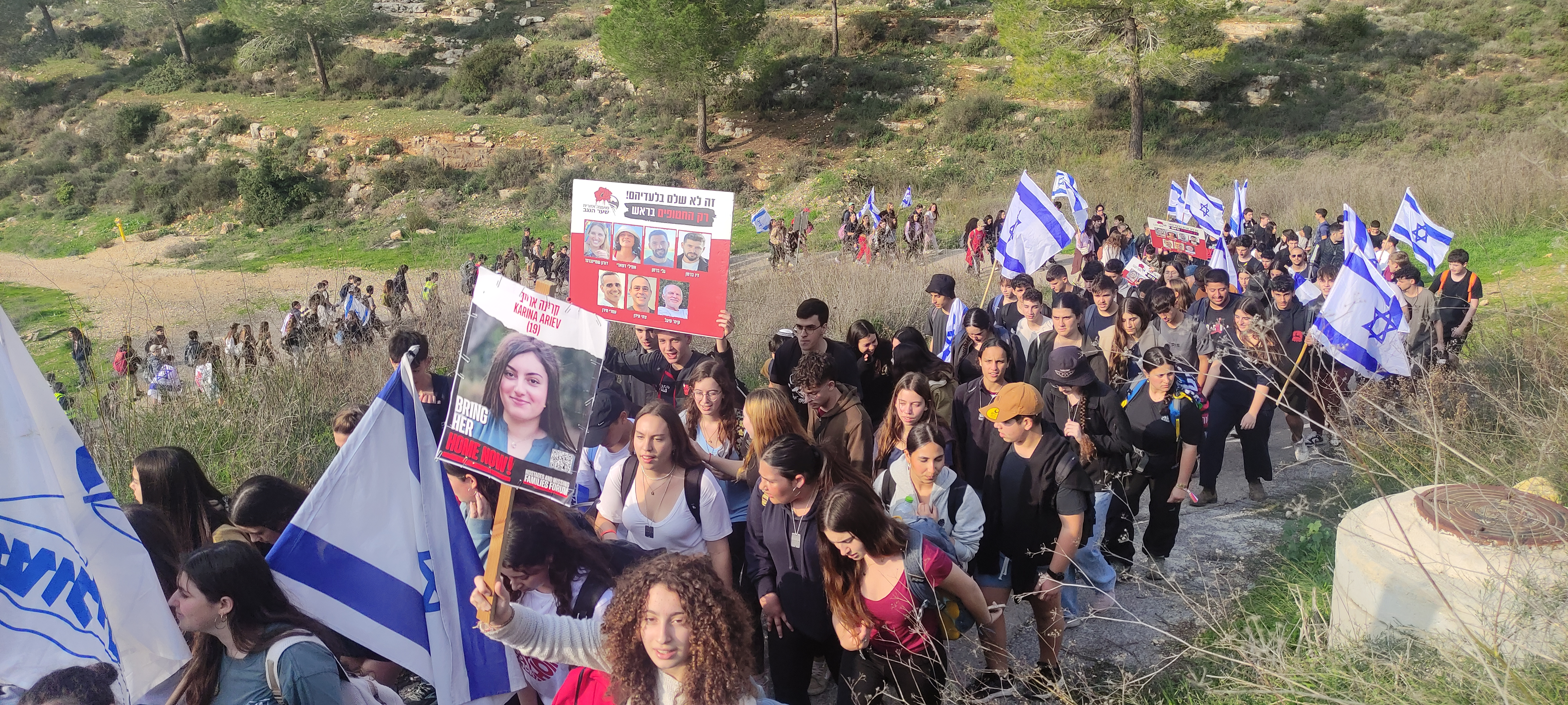
The youth march calling for the return of the kidnapped in Gaza

The Hostages and Missing Families Forum (Hebrew: מטה המשפחות להחזרת החטופים והנעדרים) is a body established by the families of people who are missing or were kidnapped to Gaza as part of the October 7 attacks.

A key part of the protest movement, their demands are;

- Immediate release of all hostages, since their holding is contrary to international law and defined as a war crime and a crime against humanity.
- Immediate opening of a humanitarian corridor to supply medicines and necessary equipment to the chronically ill and injured and examination of all hostages by a doctor.
- Intervention and assistance of the leaders of the neighboring countries in favor of the immediate release of the kidnapped hostages.

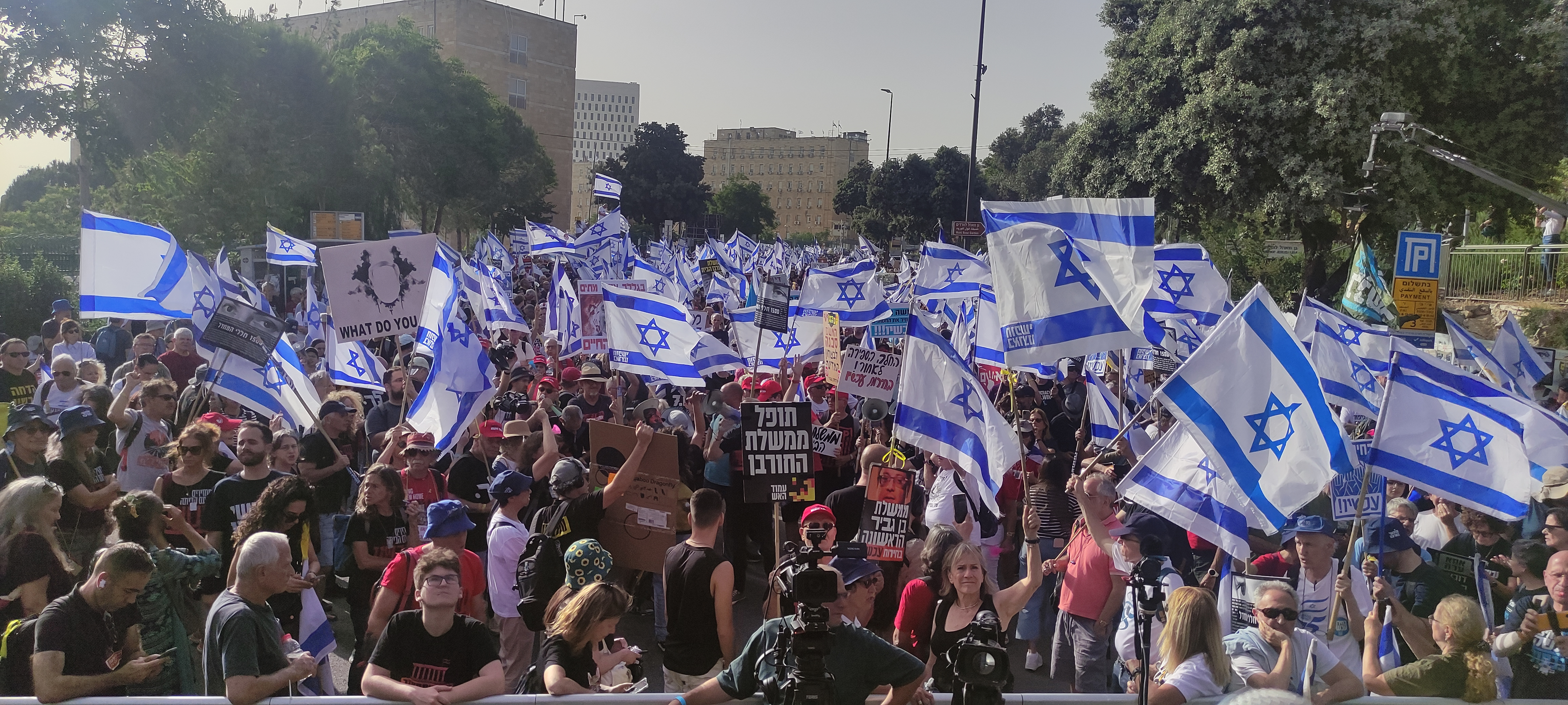
"National Disruption Day", 20 May 2024

=== Kulanu Hatufim ===
Kulanu Hatufim (Hebrew: כולנו חטופים; lit. 'we are all hostages') is an organization advocating for the hostages held in Gaza. Members of the organization include family members of the hostages, along with many supporters. They protest every day at HaKirya (near the office of the General Staff of the Israel Defense Forces at the gate on Begin Road), demanding an immediate deal to release the hostages.

=== Kaplan Force ===
Kaplan Force (Hebrew: כוח קפלן) is a liberal umbrella organization based in Israel, that is carrying out demonstrations against Netanyahu's government. Kaplan Force define themselves as a civil force of a collection of liberal protest organizations in Israel.

== Political repression ==
Minister of National Security Itamar Ben-Gvir criticized the protesters and addressed a counter-demonstration in Jerusalem. Ben-Gvir was criticized for seizing control of the police to suppress anti-government protests. According to Ma'arach Atzurim (Arrested Array), as of 3 July 2024, 1,635 Israelis had been arrested since 1 January 2023, and more than 700 were arrested since the beginning of the Israel-Hamas war.

The violence monitoring organization Alimut Israel reported 1,536 incidents of violence in 2024, with the majority attributed to police actions. Among these, 1,233 incidents involved physical assaults, 282 incidents involved violent arrests, and the remaining 193 incidents involved mounted police violence.

There are at least 34 reported instances of injuries, and 4 instances of stun grenade use as of 28 March 2025.

2025 Shin Bet affidavit states that Netanyahu explicitly told the body to conduct surveillance on citizens involved in the protests.

== Response ==
=== Israel ===
Israeli Prime Minister Benjamin Netanyahu has largely remained defiant in the face of protests and strikes, often ignoring them. However, in one instance, he criticized the protesters, describing them as "a violent and extremist minority funded by external sources".

After the wave of protests in September 2024, Netanyahu made a speech about the Philadelphi corridor without mentioning the protests.

Israel's Leader of the Opposition Yair Lapid supported the strike of the Histadrut and the September protests and accused the Netanyahu administration of leading the nation into "the greatest anarchy".
