= UnXeptable =

American-Israeli democracy movement

- אנאקספטבל
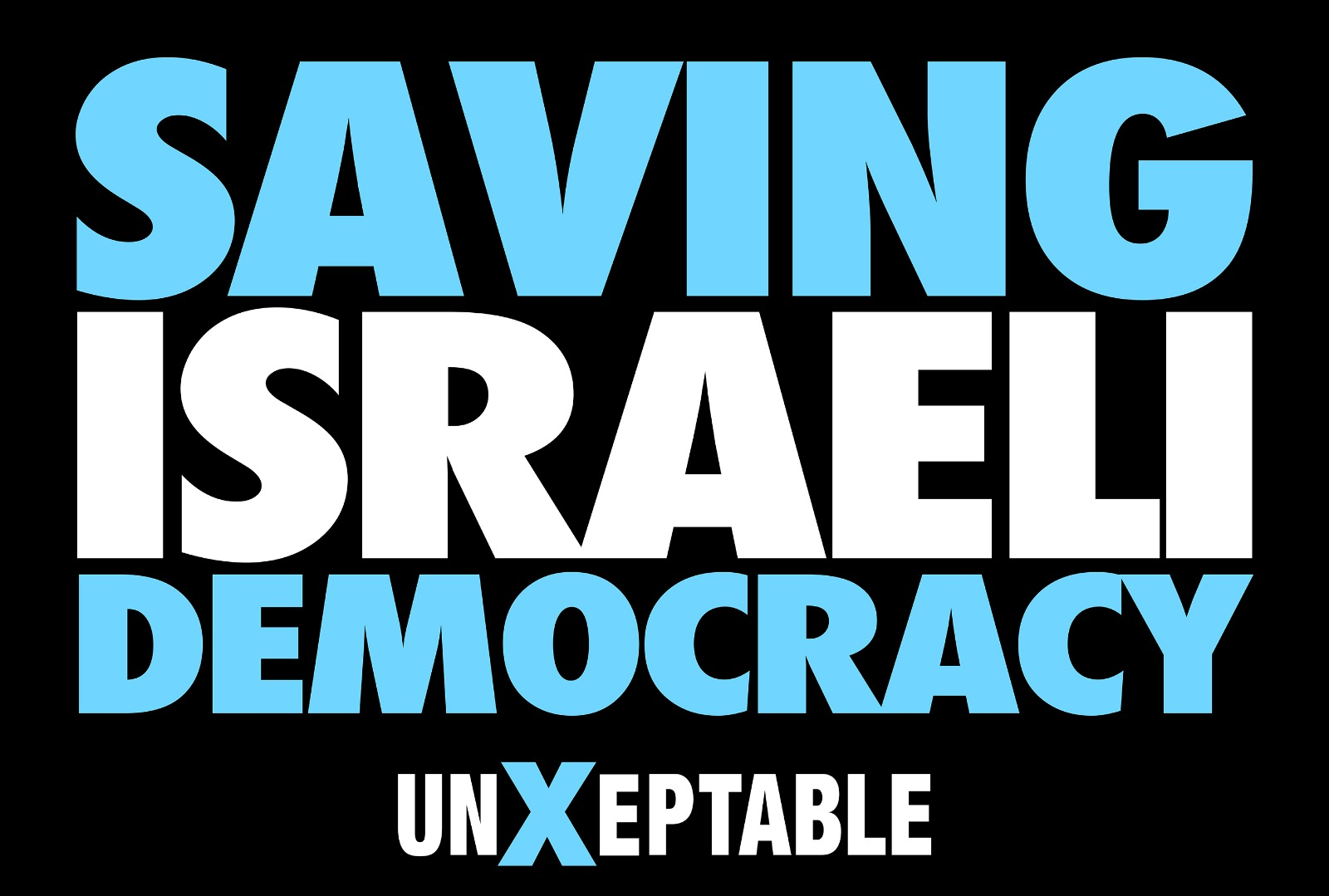
- Established: July 2020
- Founders: Offir Gutelzon; Racheli Batish-Levkovich; Neri Life-Choma; Gershon Diner; Itai Beck; Yael Yechieli; Guy Horowitz
- Headquarters: San Francisco, California
- Services: Civil protests
- Website: unxeptable.org

UnXeptable is a protest movement against Benjamin Netanyahu's continued tenure as the prime minister after he was indicted on criminal charges. Netanyahu did not resign after being indicted, and the movement's founders chose a name based on the English word unacceptable to express their opinion on his decision.

The movement was founded in July 2020 by Israelis living in the San Francisco, California, area: Offir Gutelzon, Racheli Batish-Levkovich, Neri Life-Choma, Gershon Diner, Itai Beck, Yael Yechieli, and Guy Horowitz. Since the formation of the 37th Israeli government, the movement has focused on protest actions against the coalition's plan for fundamental changes to the Israeli legal system, changes that they believe threaten to turn Israel into an illiberal democracy or even a dictatorship.

The main activities are demonstrations, activity in WhatsApp groups, large-scale online events (on Zoom), and outreach to Israeli and Jewish communities around the world. The movement includes Jewish and non-Jewish members who define themselves as supporters of democratic Israel, from Australia and Japan, through Europe and to North America. The largest groups are in New York, San Francisco and Toronto. According to Offir Gutelzon, one of the leaders of the organization, about 10,000 people from the United States, Australia and Japan participated in the movement's various activities, including virtual ones. The activity is carried out on a voluntary basis. Sound equipment, posters and other equipment are financed through fundraising by active participants and with the help of crowdfunding.

The full name of the movement is UnXeptable – Saving Israeli Democracy, which loosely translates to "Unacceptable – Saving Israeli Democracy". The name UnXeptable was coined by Neri Life-Choma, and the logo was designed by Roni Donevitz. The X is intended to resemble the letter Alef (א) in the phrase "no way" (Hebrew: אין מצב), which is the name of a 2020 Israeli protest group founded by a retired brigadier general Amir Haskel.

In October 2023, after a surprise attack on Israel and the outbreak of the Gaza war, the movement directed its volunteers to activities for the return of the kidnapped, to aid soldiers, and to help families in the south.

== Protest topics ==
=== The Balfour Protest ===
Initially, the group focused on demonstrations of solidarity and support for the Balfour Declaration. To echo the bridges protests in Israel, the first demonstration was organized in front of the Golden Gate Bridge. After a one-off demonstration in San Francisco, following appeals from across the United States, demonstrations were organized in dozens of other cities in the United States and around the world. The demonstrators called, among other things: "No to corruption, no to hatred, and no prime minister accused of crimes" and "It is good to protest for our country," explaining that they were demonstrating in support of their families living in Israel and that they were "in favor of protesting in the name of democracy, in favor of protesting that a criminally accused person cannot serve as prime minister."

Under COVID-19 restrictions, groups of Israelis flew to Washington, D.C. to support the peace accords while simultaneously protesting against Prime Minister Benjamin Netanyahu, criminally indicted, who represented Israel in the historic signing of the Abraham Accords. This demonstration was also joined by Gonen Ben-Yitzhak, one of the leaders of the Balfour protest.

Unexpected also helped with the "My Vote Will Make A Difference" campaign to encourage voting in the 2021 elections.

After the Balfour protests ended and with the establishment of the thirty-sixth Israeli government, UnXeptable's activities were temporarily suspended.

=== Protest against judicial reform in Israel ===
Immediately after the coalition agreements for the formation of the 37th Israeli government were published, UnXeptable published an open letter on behalf of Israelis abroad. The movement is protesting against systematic and structured discrimination, against the attack on the legal system and the independence of the media, against the transfer of policing powers to extremist politicians, and against the intention to change the Law of Return to allow Jews who are not recognized by the Orthodox establishment to enter. The 2023 protest focuses solely on messages defending the democratic and liberal nature of the State of Israel, while waving Israeli flags and posters criticizing the reform, and warning of its legal and economic implications and of the international isolation that the change in the government system could bring to Israel. According to them, the field activists are motivated by a deep fear of the reform being an instrument for a coup d'état, as well as harm to the families of the protesters if the planned legislative changes are implemented. In their assessment, the demonstrations serve as a tailwind In support of the protest in Israel. According to the organizers, they act out of a sense of mission and belonging to Israel and a deep concern about Israel becoming a dictatorship, as well as a desire to serve as ambassadors for the State of Israel and its values. They are also motivated by the fear that transforming Israel into an illiberal democracy will lead to an increase in anti-Semitism and the legitimacy that anti-Semitism will gain in the world. A few weeks after the publication of the legislative plan and the beginning of the protest against it in Israel, UnXeptable began weekly demonstrations in dozens of cities around the world against the planned legislative changes.

UnXeptable communicates with its activists primarily through social media, which are organized into geographically divided subgroups. The movement synchronizes its messages and activities around the world in order to broadcast a unified voice that all participants agree on, which is the preservation of democracy.

== Course of action ==
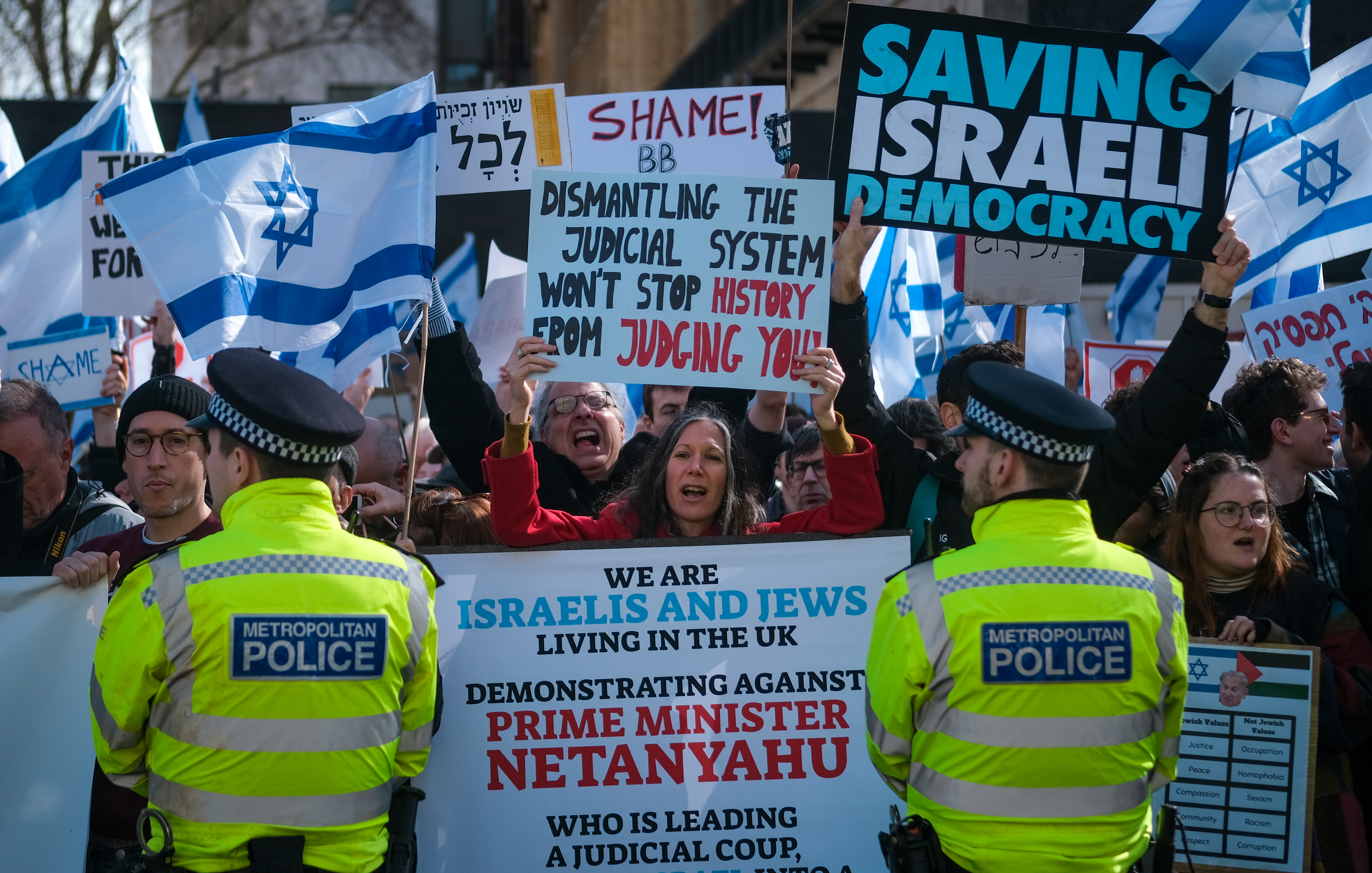
Protest against Benjamin Netanyahu in London, 24 March 2023

Weekly solidarity demonstrations are organized around the world, from Australia and Japan, through Europe and to North America. Demonstrations have been held in front of Israeli embassies (for example in Washington, London, Paris and Berlin), in front of the European Parliament, in front of the White House and at major sites in over fifty cities around the world. Some of them are protest actions against Israeli politicians who are partners in promoting changes to the judicial system. In early June 2023, about 400 people demonstrated in New Jersey against Simcha Rothman, who spoke to the Haredi community. Another protest took place as part of the special World Zionist Congress, on the occasion of 75 years of Israel's independence, held in Israel in April 2023, including a march of hundreds of representatives (out of about five hundred and eighty delegates) to the Supreme Court, in protest against the changes to the judicial system. The organization also organized a protest outside the movie theater at the premiere of the film The Bibi Files in Toronto.

In July 2023, a flotilla was held to the Statue of Liberty in New York to symbolize the values of freedom, democracy, and liberalism shared by Israel and the United States. About one hundred and fifty Israelis and American Jews participated in the flotilla to support the fighters for democracy in Israel. The protesters wore black to symbolize their understanding that a terrible black flag was flying above the legislative blitz and the violence against its opponents. After discussions with the ship's captain, a compromise was reached that the Israeli flags would be flown only during stops to allow all passengers to enjoy the cruise.

In Philadelphia, protests were held against Arthur Dantchik, the largest donor to the Kohelet Forum. This protest included frequent demonstrations in front of Dantchik's home, distribution of flyers at a synagogue frequented by Kohelet supporters, and the sending of a mass of letters from around the world to his mailbox, which was also accompanied by a social media campaign by the people who signed the letters.

Videos are edited, distributed on social media, and projected on screens at major demonstrations on Kaplan Street. In its first months of operation, videos from protest groups around the world were projected onto the side of a building in Paris Square in Jerusalem, in support of protesters during a demonstration in Israel. In addition, online lectures in English are organized for the Jewish and Israeli public outside Israel, with Israeli speakers such as former Chief Justice Dorit Beinisch, Moshe Ya'alon, Guy Rolnik, and more.

The protest movement includes petition writing and signatures, calling on international institutions such as the European Union and Jewish institutions such as the Jewish Federations of North America (JFNA) to take action or take a stand against the judicial reform. UnXeptable organizes home groups and meetings with local Jewish communities to educate and discuss the situation, which involves Diaspora Jewry in the protest, even though loyalty to the State of Israel and the Israeli government is ingrained in Jewish communities, and it is very difficult for them to express opposition to Israel. Some say that in this protest, the Conservative and Reform communities in the United States feel threatened by what is happening in Israel, feel that Israel as they knew it is being taken from them and, in their understanding, the demonstration is not against Israel but for it, and is not political but comes from love of the country and the desire to preserve democracy. In an article about the presence of Rabbi J. Rosenbaum of Seattle at the forefront of the protest, it is clarified that these are not young progressives opposed to the occupation, but rather adults, clear supporters of Israel who see the planned moves as an existential threat to the State of Israel as a Jewish and democratic state. Rabbi Rosenbaum explained that world Jewry must not remain silent, that the danger to Israel's existence requires the extraordinary step of taking to the streets in solidarity with the protesters in Israel, all in order to protect democracy in Israel. An example of an attempt to influence American Jewry is that at each of the first eight demonstrations in Bellevue, a rabbi from a different community spoke. In July 2023, UnXeptable published a letter signed by two hundred rabbis, clergy, and community leaders calling on the Israeli government to find a way to protect the foundations of Israeli democracy and preserve its checks and balances.

UnXeptable succeeded for the first time in uniting Israelis and Jewish communities in the Diaspora under a common goal of supporting Israel, while legitimizing both populations to criticize the policies of the Israeli government, all out of love and support for the country.

The protest includes religious LGBTQI. Rabbi Amichai Lau-Lavie of New York, who helped organize one of the first demonstrations and even spoke at it, shared with the reporter his feeling that, as a proud rabbi, he feels that his Judaism is under attack.

UnXeptable is rallying support among U.S. Congressmen. In July 2023, Congresswoman Jan Schakowsky was the first member of Congress to speak at an UnXeptable rally. Along with Congresswoman Annie Kuster, Schkowski is promoting a statement by members of Congress opposing "any action that would undermine the future of Israel as a Jewish and democratic state" and supporting the protest movement against the judicial reform, a statement supported by UnXeptable.

UnXeptable often works in collaboration with another protest organization founded in Berlin called Defend Israeli Democracy. This organization currently organizes vigorous protest activity in many cities across the European continent.

== Activity during the Gaza war ==
After the start of the Gaza war, UnXeptable converted the connections and tools used for protest into activities in support of the Israeli war effort and public pressure for the release of over two hundred hostages held by Hamas. The movement's motto changed from "Saving Israeli Democracy" to "Saving Israel." UnXeptable utilized its infrastructure and the connections it had formed with Jewish communities around the world to quickly convert the effort from protest to mobilization of aid for Israel. Key actions included:

- Organizing, purchasing, and flying tons of equipment such as first aid kits, clothing, batteries, headlamps, and watches (necessary because phones are not taken into combat zones) for soldiers, after coordinating needs with Brothers in Arms. Philadelphia-based activist Tali Rainer Brodetzky organized a wish list on Amazon. The most urgent needs for soldiers were identified with the help of Brothers in Arms. Volunteers responded to the call and purchased 80,000 headlamps, 100,000 khaki shirts, socks, tourniquets and bandages, and ceramic vests. In a complex logistical process, the equipment was transferred to Israel, and Brothers in Arms activists ensured its distribution among the soldiers.
- Organizing a chartered plane to fly reservists to Israel.
- Organizing memorial ceremonies in various cities around the world, together with Jewish communities.
- Organizing demonstrations for the return of the kidnapped and hanging posters with their pictures in various cities around the world to raise awareness, under the name Bring Them Home.
- Projecting pictures of the kidnapped on the United Nations building in New York.
- Raising funds for donations.

The movement called on American lawmakers to protest in any way against Netanyahu when he addresses Congress in July 2024 and organized protests against him throughout Washington, calling for the release of the hostages and the saving of Israeli democracy, using the slogan "Netanyahu Non-Grata" (Netanyahu is not welcome).

In November 2024, amid the public controversy surrounding the content of the documentary The Bibi Files and the ban on its screening in Israel, UnXeptable organized free online access to the film for two days, several weeks before its commercial release began.

== Criticism ==
The main criticism against the group focuses on the question of the legitimacy of the intervention in what is happening in Israel by protesters living outside of it. Opponents, including supporters of the current Netanyahu government coalition, criticize demonstrations against the Israeli government, on the grounds that they harm Israel's standing in the world. It is claimed against the protesters that they are "a different breed of Jews," who are "exilic and harmful," whose goal is to "ingratiate themselves with the Gentiles" and "aid the enemies of Israel." According to the opponents, Israelis living abroad are not allowed to demonstrate against the government in Israel because it is interference in an internal debate. As early as 2020, it was claimed that they were playing into the hands of BDS.

Additional concerns are that the protest will lead to an increase in anti-Semitism, that the protest will be perceived as anti-Israel, or that it will harm Israel by "giving ammunition" to Israel's enemies by "washing dirty laundry" outside of Israel. An example of this criticism was given in connection with the protests in Washington against Finance Minister Bezalel Smotrich, in which it was stated that JVP sees the protests as an opportunity to encourage a boycott of Israel.

Other claims are that UnXeptable is an anarchist group that persecuted billionaire Arthur Dantchik in Philadelphia and caused him to stop his donations to the right-wing organization Kohelet, which united anti-Israel Jews in the United States and around the world against the right-wing government in Israel, and that they raised huge sums for their struggle from private sources and progressive organizations, including those that fund Brothers in Arms and Kaplan Force.

== See also ==
- Judicial reform protests
