= Kaplan Force =

Israeli protest movement

Kaplan Force (Hebrew: כוח קפלן) is a liberal umbrella organization based in Israel, that is carrying out demonstrations against Netanyahu's government. Kaplan Force define themselves as a civil force of a collection of liberal protest organizations in Israel. They've demonstrated at the 2023 Israeli judicial reform protests and at the Israeli hostage deal protests. Also informally known as the Kaplanists, the Kaplan Force is named after Kaplan Street which is where anti-government protests usually take place in Israel.

== History ==
=== Establishment ===
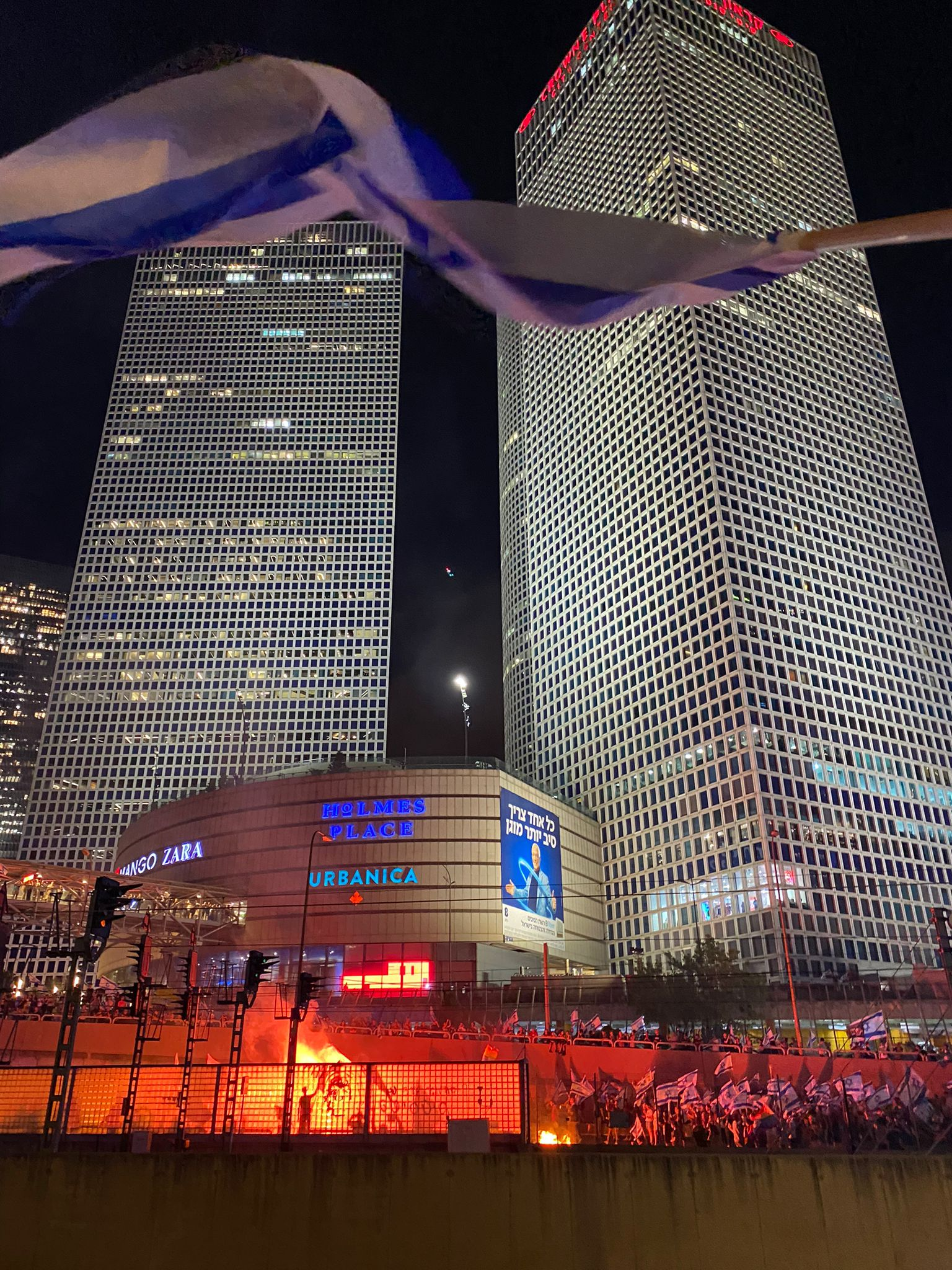
"Eshed Night"

Kaplan Force began their activities on June 25, 2023. The members of the organization announced "targeted actions against the laws of the dictatorship", referring to 2023 Israeli judicial reform. At those moments, at the 25th demonstration, the members of the organization announced a blockade of several main highways in Israel, and a "siege" on Ben Gurion Airport, aiming to disrupt Israeli flight activity.

Supporters of Netanyahu's government strongly opposed the organisation plans, saying it's "Anarchistic".

On 3 July 2023, they were successful at blocking main highways, including Highway 1, Highway 20, and were successful at distrupting Ben Gurion Airport terminals.

=== Ami Eshed Protests ===
On the night of July 5, 2023, Ami Eshed, chief of the Tel Aviv District Police, announced his resignation. Kaplan Force have said in response that he "was fired on political grounds by Ben Gvir, because he refused to break the protesters' bones". Later on that night, spontaneous demonstrations began in 40 different locations throughout Israel and Ayalon was blocked in both directions. Dozens were arrested and at least 3 were injured.
