= Human rights in Palestine =

The state of human rights in the West Bank and Gaza Strip is determined by Palestinian as well as Israeli policies, which affect Palestinians in the occupied Palestinian territories both directly and indirectly, through their influence over the Palestinian Authority (PA). Based on The Economist Democracy Index this state is classified as an authoritarian regime.

== Status of freedom, political rights and civil liberties ==
=== Rights and Liberties Ratings ===
At the Economist Intelligence Unit (Democracy Index) rankings, the highest index reports most democracy. Of the 167 countries participated in the ranking, North Korea was worst (index 1.08) and Norway was best (index 9.87). Palestine ranked 117th, with an index of 3.89. Freedom House's annual survey of political rights and civil liberties, Freedom in the World 2001–2002, reported that civil liberties declined in Palestine "due to the shooting deaths of Palestinian civilians by Palestinian security personnel; the summary trials and executions of alleged collaborators by the Palestinian Authority (PA), extrajudicial killings of suspected collaborators by militias; and apparent official encouragement of Palestinian youths to confront Israeli soldiers, thus placing them directly in harm's way." The Palestinian Human Rights Monitoring Group reports "everyday disagreements and clashes between the various political factions, families and cities that a complete picture of Palestinian society is painted. These divisions have during the course of the al Aqsa Intifada also led to an increasingly violent 'Intra'fada'."

== Individual freedoms and rights ==
=== Freedom of speech ===
The PA has guaranteed freedom of assembly to the Palestinian population, and its legislation states this. Nevertheless, the right to demonstrate for opponents of the PA regime or of PA policy has become increasingly subject to police control and restriction and is a source of concern for human rights groups.

Activists say there is a growing crackdown on writers who criticize the Palestinian Government. According to executive director of Advancing Human Rights David Keyes, in 2013, Anas Awwad, a 26-year-old Palestinian activist, was sentenced in absentia by a Palestinian court in Nablus, the West Bank, to one year in prison for "extending his tongue" against the Palestinian Authority's president, Mahmoud Abbas, on Facebook. Keyes also states that in 2012, Palestinian blogger Jamal Abu Rihan was arrested by the Palestinian Authority for starting a Facebook campaign called the People Want an End to Corruption. He was indicted under the charges of "extending his tongue" against the Palestinian leadership.

In April 2012, a West Bank university lecturer, Ismat Abdul-Khaleq, was arrested for criticizing Abbas on Facebook. Subsequently, agents belonging to the PA's Preventive Security Service in Ramallah arrested Tarek Khamis, who works for the Palestinian Zaman Press news agency. He was detained for criticizing the Palestinian Authority's treatment of Abdul-Khaleq and for criticizing the clampdown on journalists in the West Bank. According to David Keyes, George Canawati, the director of a Bethlehem radio station and journalist Rami Samar were detained for posting criticisms of the Palestinian Authority on Facebook.

Death threats were made against Minister Nabil Shaath for planning to participate in a conference in Italy attended by Israeli Foreign Minister Silvan Shalom by the Jenin Martyrs Brigades, the armed wing of the Popular Resistance Committees. They declared, "He will be sentenced to death if he enters. The decision cannot be rescinded, we call upon his bodyguards to abandon his convoy in order to save their lives."

Nabil Amar, former Minister of Information and a cabinet member and a member of the Palestinian Legislative Council, was shot by masked gunmen after criticizing Arafat and calling for reforms in the PA in a television interview.

A Hamas-run council in the West Bank came under international criticism in 2005 for barring an open-air music and dance festival, on the basis of being "against Islam".

February 2016, Euro-Mediterranean Human Rights Monitor has issued report documenting freedom of expression violations in both West Bank and Gaza Strip. The Euro-Med report, "Strangulation Twice: the Oppressive Practices of Palestinian Security Services", documents 1,274 arbitrary detentions in the West Bank in 2015 and 1,089 summonses to appear in front of the police or "interior security". Most of these actions by the Palestinian Authority targeted individuals affiliated with Hamas or who opposed PA policies. In Gaza, 117 arbitrary detentions and 98 orders to appear were attributed last year to Hamas, which governs the Strip. Like their PA counterparts, the security forces primarily targeted political opponents. The monitor said that the number of human rights violations committed by PA authorities in the West Bank were significantly greater than those for which Hamas was responsible. However, both organizations are guilty of censorship and oppression. The Euro-Med monitor called both sides, the PA and Hamas, to issue a clear and binding resolution mandating freedom of expression and prohibiting all forms of abusive detention.

In August 2016, Human Rights Watch published a report about Palestine discussing the freedom of expression in the Palestinian territories. The international organization documented the case of Majd Khawaja, 22, who was arrested by security forces at intelligence headquarter. Khawaja was accused of painting the word (intifada) uprising on a wall, having weapons and planning to smuggle people into Jordan. He was subjected to physical torture during interrogation. He published some songs about the corruption of the PA which considered as a criminal offense; The songs were removed from YouTube.

August 2016, Human Rights Watch published a report about Palestine discussing the freedom of expression in the Palestinian territories. The international organization documented the case of Mutaz Abu Lihi, 21, who was arrested by security forces at intelligence headquarter according to court documents, the Palestinian prosecution charged Abu Lihi and his rappers fellows with creating strife, under article 150 of penal code, and criticizing a higher authority, under article 195. The prosecution said that Abu Lihi and others sprayed outdoor graffiti whose content was "defamatory sentences that include insulting directed personally against the president of the state of Palestine and against the authorities".

December 2016, Euro Med Human Rights Monitors issued a report regarding the violation of human rights and the international law in Palestine. As the three lawmakers were staging a sit- in at the office of the international committee of the Red Cross, their parliamentary immunity was suspended by the Palestinian president- Mahmoud Abbas; two of them are accused of embezzlement, weapons smuggling and defamation; as well as they were prevented from the delivery of food, water and visits by journalists. The three lawmakers instead stated that the president committed this as a revenge against them due to their alliance with Mohammad Dahalan. According to the report, breaking the international committee of the Red Cross were considered as a violation of the international laws and conventions. The Palestinian authority's action was also in direct contradiction of the Palestinian executive system and its commitment to human rights standards as dictated by international agreements.

Al-Mizan Center for Human Rights published a report about violating the right of expression in Gaza. Since the beginning of winter, the electricity cuts began to worsen, which has negatively impacted the population of two million's basic needs. The electricity came on for four hours, followed by a 12-hour blackout. Due to Israel's border closures, there was a lack of fuel on the markets in Gaza as well and the humanitarian crisis got much worse: increasing numbers of deaths, particularly among children and older, sick and disabled people living in the hundreds of high-rise building without elevators. On 12 January 2017, many thousands of people were gathered in Jabaliya refugee camp to demonstrate in front of the Electricity Company. The police dispersed them by shooting in the air and beating some people with cudgels. Accordingly, Mohammed Al Baba, a journalist at Agence France Presse, was sustained a cut over his left eye and his camera was seized as well as Fares Akram Al Ghoul, a journalist from the Associated Press, was assaulted by them. There are also six people sustained bruises. As mentioned in the report, the police summoned groups of people for questioning and broke into houses to arrest people with a view of forcing them to sign documents committing themselves to "respecting the law" and to prevent them from disturbing so called "public security" despite their violating of the Gaza population's right to protest in peaceful way and give their expression.

=== Freedom of the press ===
As of 2006, sixteen Palestinian journalists have been killed or wounded by PA security forces or armed groups.

Abdullah Issa, Palestinian publisher and editor of the on-line magazine Donia al Watan was detained in July 2006 by the Palestinian Authority for publishing a story about the theft of $400,000 from PA Foreign Minister Mahmud al-Zahar while visiting Kuwait. The story cast aspersions on Hamas for having large amounts of cash while the Palestinian people were suffering from poverty. This story had appeared elsewhere in the Arabic media. Issa, accused al-Zahar and Hamas of interfering with freedom of the press in the Palestinian territories and expressed disappointment with Hamas's failure to reign in corruption as promised in their election platform: "Our people have the right to hold Hamas accountable for the deterioration in their living conditions,...We were hoping that the Hamas government would start chasing and arresting all the murderers and thugs who continue to roam the streets of the Gaza Strip and to open all the cases of financial corruption." Donia al Watan's offices have been attacked by masked gunmen and there have been death threats against Issa and staff.

The Al-Aqsa Martyrs' Brigades has been blamed for a number of attacks on journalists in the West Bank and Gaza Strip and the Arab television station Al-Arabiya's West Bank offices.

In September 2001, Yasser Arafat's Tanzim kidnapped a Palestinian cameraman who shot film showing Palestinian citizens and police in Ramallah celebrating on 9/11/2001 following the attacks on US targets, and threatened to kill the cameraman if the film was shown on air.

In September 2006, a journalist was severely beaten and the computer equipment in the office of the Palestinian Authority's official news agency Wafa was destroyed. Graffiti was sprayed on the wall accusing the agency of a lack of objectivity. Fatah officials noted that PA Foreign Minister Mahmoud Zahar has accused the agency "of waging a politically-motivated campaign of incitement" against him and blamed Hamas for the attack. Khan Yunis governor Osama al-Farra condemned the attack, saying it, "reflected the continued state of anarchy and lawlessness in PA-controlled areas".

The Fatah–Hamas conflict has further limited the freedom of the press in the PNA territories and the distribution of opposing voices in Hamas-controlled Gaza and the West Bank where Fatah still has more influence. In July 2010, with the easing of the blockade of the Gaza Strip, Israel allowed the distribution of the pro-Fatah newspapers al Quds, al Ayyam and al-Hayat al-Jadida to Gaza, but Hamas prevented Gazan distributors from retrieving the shipment. The Palestinian Centre for Human Rights (PCHR) condemned the Hamas restrictions of distribution of the West Bank newspapers in Gaza, and also condemned the Fatah-led government in the West Bank for restricting publication and distribution of the Gazan newspapers al-Resala and Falastin.

In October 2012, the Palestinian Journalists Syndicate appealed for the release of Palestinian journalists arrested by the Palestinian Authority in the West Bank, warning that freedom of the press had "seriously deteriorated," and that the Palestinian Authority had arrested five Palestinian journalists in September 2012. Walid Khaled, a journalist for the Palestinian newspaper Falasteen, began a hunger strike in September as well. A Palestinian judge ordered his release, but the Palestinian Authority ignored this. The Palestinian Authority has arrested these journalists on suspicisions of having connections to Hamas, a rival which controls the Gaza Strip.

In May 2015, Al-Jazeera journalist Muhammed Fayyad was reportedly assaulted by multiple police officers while covering a Turkish minister's visit to the Gazan Ministry of Endowments. Fayyad, who said he "was struck on the head by a police officer" as he was ejected from the building, was later arrested. Gaza's Ministry of Internal Affairs released a statement that faulted "some journalists" for "chaos and a disturbance that misrepresented our people's image and embarrassed those responsible for the visit's agenda," and claimed that Fayyad was released pending further investigation.

In addition to direct attacks on journalists, Palestinian journalists and media organizations have reported significant casualties among their family members during the ongoing conflict in Gaza. According to the Palestinian Journalists Syndicate, more than 700 relatives of Palestinian journalists have been killed—a figure reported by Al Jazeera. The syndicate emphasized that these deaths highlight the broader humanitarian impact of the conflict on journalists and their families. Earlier in the conflict, the syndicate stated that at least 70 journalists had lost close family members, indicating that multiple journalists were affected, sometimes involving more than one relative.

=== Freedom of association ===
In 2000 the Palestinian the first Palestinian Labor Law. However, according to the Democracy and Workers' Rights Center (DWRC) the final draft lacked teeth; late in 2005, working with Palestinian Authority legal experts, DWRC successfully achieved Palestinian Legislative Council acceptance of an alternative Palestinian Labor Law.

The decades-old Palestinian General Federation of Trade Unions (PGFTU), which claims to represent all Palestinian workers, was incorporated into the PA upon its inception. Independent unionists assert the PGFTU lacks in internal democracy and transparency, and is dominated by Fateh (all of its general secretaries and most of its unit heads have come from Fateh). In a 2007 press release carried by the Advocacy Project, DWRC noted that internal elections had not been held since 1981. These critiques have been supported by scholars Joost Hiltermann, Nina Sovich and Sos Nissen, who argue that the PGFTU has long been dominated by political factions and has in turn failed to provide effective representation for workers.

According to the PGFTU, in June 2007 Hamas seized their headquarters and ordered PGFTU staff to discuss how they were to operate under Hamas rule. According to the PGFTU general secretary, the PGFTU's refusal to negotiate led Hamas to attempt to assassinate Rasem Al Bayari, the union's deputy general secretary, three times thereafter. According to Al-Jazeera, "Saed, who has been linked to Fatah, said Hamas executive forces had seized two more offices - in Gaza and Khan Younis - taking much of the property within."

In 2007, when DWRC organized the Federation of Independent and Democratic Trade Unions & Workers' Committees in Palestine representing 50,000 workers outside of the PGFTU, the PGFTU retaliated by informing on the Gaza head of DWRC and the independent trade union coalition to Palestinian internal security, claiming that they were affiliated with Hamas.

=== Freedom of religion ===
Many Jewish and Christian holy sites remain in areas controlled by the Palestinian National Authority. Under the Oslo Accords, both the Palestinians and Israel agreed to respect and protect religious rights of Jews, Christians, Muslims, and Samaritans by a) protecting the Holy Sites, 2) providing free access to the Holy Sites, and assuring freedom of worship and practice. a. Protection of the Holy Sites; b. Free access to the Holy Sites; and c. Freedom of worship and practice. The PA, however, has in some cases failed to honor these commitments (see sections below).

A Christian leader claimed that there were "rampant reports" of abuses and persecution in PA-run areas. Anti-Christian riots were reported in Ramallah and surrounding villages, as well as in towns in the Gaza Strip. There were also reports of violation of human rights of Christians in the PA-run areas.

In April 2006, major Muslim organizations, local mosques, the city's Mufti and municipal leaders in the West Bank town Qalqiliya requested the interior minister of the Palestinian Authority shut down the Young Men's Christian Association, which had operated in the town since 2000, due to missionary activity. The manager of the YMCA denied this: "It's not what we're about. There is no missionary activity here whatsoever. The YMCA is in the city to serve the population with financial help, sporting activities and general educational programs," and pointing to the organization's employment of many Muslims, their establishment of community programs including financing a mostly Muslim soccer club that had competed in national games. The town's Muslim leadership issued a petition demanding that the organization close down the Qalqiliya branch or face violence which read as follows: "We the preachers of the mosques and representatives of major families in Qalqiliya ask you to close the offices of the YMCA because the population of Qalqiliya doesn't need such offices, especially since there are not many Christians in our city..." It warned, "The act of these institutions of the YMCA, including attempting to convert Muslims in our city, will bring violence and tension." Three days before the delivery of this petitions, many imams spoke about the issue during Friday prayers; the following day Molotov cocktails were thrown at Qalqiliya's YMCA. In September 2006, the YMCA was given a "final notification" by local leaders. On 11 September 2006, the organization's building was broken into and torched by assailants identified by members of the local government as members of Hamas and Islamic Jihad well known to local security forces.

==== Christian sites ====
During 2007 many Western and Christian targets were attacked in the West Bank and Gaza. Members of local gangs and terror cells blew up and destroyed institutions linked to Western culture such as American schools, church libraries and dozens of Internet cafes. These events were largely ignored by the media.

According to the U.S. State Department's Annual Report on Religious Freedom, 2000, "there were periodic reports that some Christian converts from Islam who publicize their religious beliefs have been harassed. Converts complained that they were mistreated and threatened. The draft Palestinian Basic Law specifically forbids discrimination against individuals based on their religion; however, the PA did not take any action against persons accused of harassment".

After a visit to the Palestinian Authority administered areas, Senator Connie Mack related on the floor of the US Senate the case of a Christian convert from Islam who was falsely charged with selling land to Jews, arrested, beaten and tortured, and held for eight months without trial. Despite being released after his family borrowed thousands of dollars for bribes, his father continued to be held, he believed as insurance of his silence on the matter.

==== Jewish sites ====
Joseph's Tomb in Nablus was a site of clashes between Jews and Palestinians. The Israeli army agreed to withdraw from the site and turn over control to the Palestinian police, who had agreed to protect the site. Instead, they stood by while mobs ransacked the site and burned holy books.

Moreover, prominent members of the PA have denied that there is any Jewish historical connection to many Jewish holy sites, and PA Ministries have embedded such ideas in their press releases:

Yasser Arafat:

- "That is not the Western Wall at all, but a Muslim shrine". – Yasser Arafat.
- "Abraham was neither Jewish nor a Hebrew, but was simply an Iraqi. The Jews have no right to claim part of the Tomb of the Patriarchs in Hebron, Abraham's resting place, as a synagogue. Rather, the whole building should be a mosque."

Mufti Sheikh 'Ikrima Sabri:

- "No stone of the Al-Buraq [Western] Wall has any relation to Judaism. The Jews began praying at this wall only in the 19th century, when they began to develop [national] aspirations."

PA Information Ministry Press Release:

- "The archeology of Jerusalem is diverse – excavations in the Old City and the areas surrounding it revealed Umayyad Islamic palaces, Roman ruins, Armenian ruins and others, but nothing Jewish. Outside of what is mentioned in the Old and New Testaments, there is no tangible evidence of any Jewish traces in the old city of Jerusalem and its immediate vicinity."

Al-Hayat Al-Jadeeda, PA newspaper:

- "Be alert and treat Joseph's Tomb and Rachel's Tomb as parcels of Palestinian land which must be liberated, and treat Joseph and Rachel as two people who died, like anyone else."

=== Freedom to resist ===
The Palestinians' right to resist is a significant issue deeply rooted in the ongoing conflict between Israel and Palestine, particularly in relation to the Israeli occupation of Palestinian territories. Under international law the right to resist excludes recourse to violence against civilians.

=== Right to education ===
According to the ministerial statistic collected in September 2005, there are 2267 schools in general education, 31,001 classes, 1078488 students, and 48674 teachers in the Palestinian territories. 24% of schools are UNRWA-operated, 70% are governmental, and 6% are private. Another survey conducted in May 2005 shows that there are 138,139 students enrolled in Higher Education Institutions. Between these students, 9002 (6.5%) are in community colleges, 6034 (4.4%) in university colleges, 46453 (33.6%) in Al-Quds Open University, and 76650 (55.5%) in traditional universities.

Moves by the Hamas-run Education Ministry to impose Islamist ideals onto the educational system concern many Palestinians and outside observers. In March 2007, the Ministry pulled an anthology of folktales narrated by Palestinian women from the curriculum, removed the book from libraries, and reportedly destroyed 1,500 copies. The anthology was edited by Sharif Kanaana, a novelist and anthropology professor at Ramallah's Birzeit University, and Ibrahim Muhawi, a teacher of Arabic literature and the theory of translation. Education Minister Nasser Shaer said that the book is "full of clear sexual expressions." A story entitled, "The Little Bird," mentions private parts, and in the notes the authors say that, "the bird in the story is a symbol of femininity and that sexual subjects are a principal source of humor in Palestinian folklore".

A report published in September 2026 by Adalah, the Legal Center for Arab Minority Rights in Israel, documents a systematic pattern of disciplinary measures taken against Palestinian students in Israeli institutions of higher education since the onset of the Gaza war in October 2023. The report finds that Israeli universities have created a dual disciplinary system: Palestinian students are subjected to an "administrative track" that denies them basic procedural protections and the presumption of innocence, whereas Jewish Israeli students are afforded "constitutional track" safeguards grounded in the rule of law. More than 130 complaints from Palestinian students across roughly 40 institutions were documented, over three‑quarters of whom were women. Recorded cases include a student facing permanent expulsion and loss of academic credits for sharing a video of a religious figure praying for Gaza, and another who was suspended for posting a verse from the Quran. The report also notes that students' Palestinian identity itself came under explicit scrutiny. In one case, a disciplinary committee pressed a student on why she expressed sympathy for the children of Gaza but not for Israeli children.

=== Status of women ===
Women have full suffrage in the PA. In the 2006 elections, women made up 47% of registered voters. Prior to the elections, the election law was amended to introduce a quota for women on national party lists, resulting in 22% of candidates on national lists being women. The quota's effectiveness was illustrated in comparison with the district elections, where there was no quota, and only 15 of the 414 candidates were women.

The Palestinian Labour Law of 2000 prohibits gender-based discrimination between men and women in the workplace, and allows for a 12-week maternity leave period.

Hamas has begun enforcing some Islamic standards of dress for women in Gaza, where women must wear a headscarf to enter government ministry buildings. In July 2010, Hamas banned the smoking of hookah by women in public. They claimed that it was to reduce the increasing amount of divorces.

Honor killings are a problem in the PA; the Hamas government has not moved to stop these killings and may have set up infrastructures which participate in them. According to the 2005 Annual Report of The Palestinian Human Rights Monitoring Group, 11 Palestinian women died as a result of honor killings in 2005. A November 2006 Human Rights Watch report, A Question of Security Violence against Palestinian Women and Girls, notes that, "a significant number of women and girls in the Occupied Palestinian Territories (OPT) are victims of violence perpetrated by family members and intimate partners. While there is increasing recognition of the problem and some PA officials have indicated support for a more forceful response, little action has been taken to seriously address these abuses. Indeed, there is some evidence the level of violence is getting worse while the remedies available to victims are being further eroded."

Crimes against women accelerated during 2007. Cases of women being beaten are common in the Gaza Strip. Women murdered for "family honor" are seldom reported. Most women who are murdered are buried by members of their family in secret, and their deaths are not reported to any official body. The Palestinian media also refrain from reporting on this, for the sake of "family honor."

Israeli officials say Hamas in the Gaza Strip has established hard-line Islamic courts and created the Hamas Anti-Corruption Group, which is described as a kind of "morality police" operating within Hamas' organization. Hamas has denied the existence of the anti-corruption group, but it was recently reported to have carried out a high-profile "honor killing" widely covered by the Palestinian media.

In 2013, UNRWA canceled its annual marathon in Gaza after Hamas rulers prohibited women from participating in the race.

=== Status of homosexuality ===
Gay Palestinians are often arrested and tortured. According to Shaul Ganon of the Israeli-based gay rights group, Aguda, "The PA's usual excuse for persecuting gays is to label them collaborators--though I know of two cases in the last three years where people were tried explicitly for being homosexuals...It's now [since the intifada, when police increasingly began enforcing Islamic law] impossible to be an open gay in the P.A."

Part of the problem is that gay Palestinians are blackmailed into working as informants by Israeli security services.

== Law enforcement ==
According to annual report of the Palestinian Human Rights Monitoring Group in 2005, 385 Palestinian fatalities were recorded. Of these, 222 Palestinians were killed by Israelis, 113 Palestinians were killed by Palestinians, and 50 Palestinians were killed in unclear circumstances. 9 Palestinians were killed by Israeli settlers. The same year, 51 Israelis were killed by Palestinians; 42 were civilians, 9 were members of the military. Palestinians killed 10 Palestinians suspected to be Israeli collaborators in 2005.

=== Arab Organization for Human Rights Report ===
In December 2012, Arab Organization for Human Rights (AOHR) released a report that accused the Palestinian Authority (PA) of "inhumane practices and human rights violations" against Palestinian civilians. The AOHR alleges that from 2007 to 2011, the PA detained 13,271 Palestinians, and tortured 96% of them, resulting in six deaths. The report claims that PA law enforcement raided universities, hospitals and houses in order to arrest people wanted for protesting against the Israeli occupation. The report also relates that PA officers confiscated equipment and personal cash after arresting the suspects.

=== Conditions for detainees ===
Amnesty International has published a number of reports documenting the Palestine Authority's arrest and detention of civilians without charge. In one year at least 400 such detentions were reported, primarily of political dissidents to the Palestine Authority . In that single year Amnesty International found: "Torture [by the Palestine Authority] of detainees remained widespread. Seven detainees died in custody. Unlawful killings, including possible extrajudicial executions, continued to be reported."

In 2025, Israeli authorities detained Mohammed Zaher Ibrahim, a 15-year-old Palestinian-American from the West Bank. Human rights organizations and media reports indicated that he suffered significant weight loss, contracted scabies, and received inadequate medical care while held in Megiddo and Ofer prisons. His family denied the allegations against him, and more than 100 U.S.-based civil society organizations urged the U.S. government to intervene on his behalf. The case renewed attention to the treatment of Palestinian minors in Israeli detention facilities.

== Capital punishment ==
Capital punishment is legal under Palestinian National Authority (PA). The Ramallah-based PA carried out one execution in 2000, one in 2001, three in 2002 and five in 2005.

=== Palestinian land laws ===
Under the Palestinian National Authority government, theoretically selling land to Jews is a crime punishable by death. But no executions for this offence have ever been recorded.

== Exposure of civilian targets to military action ==
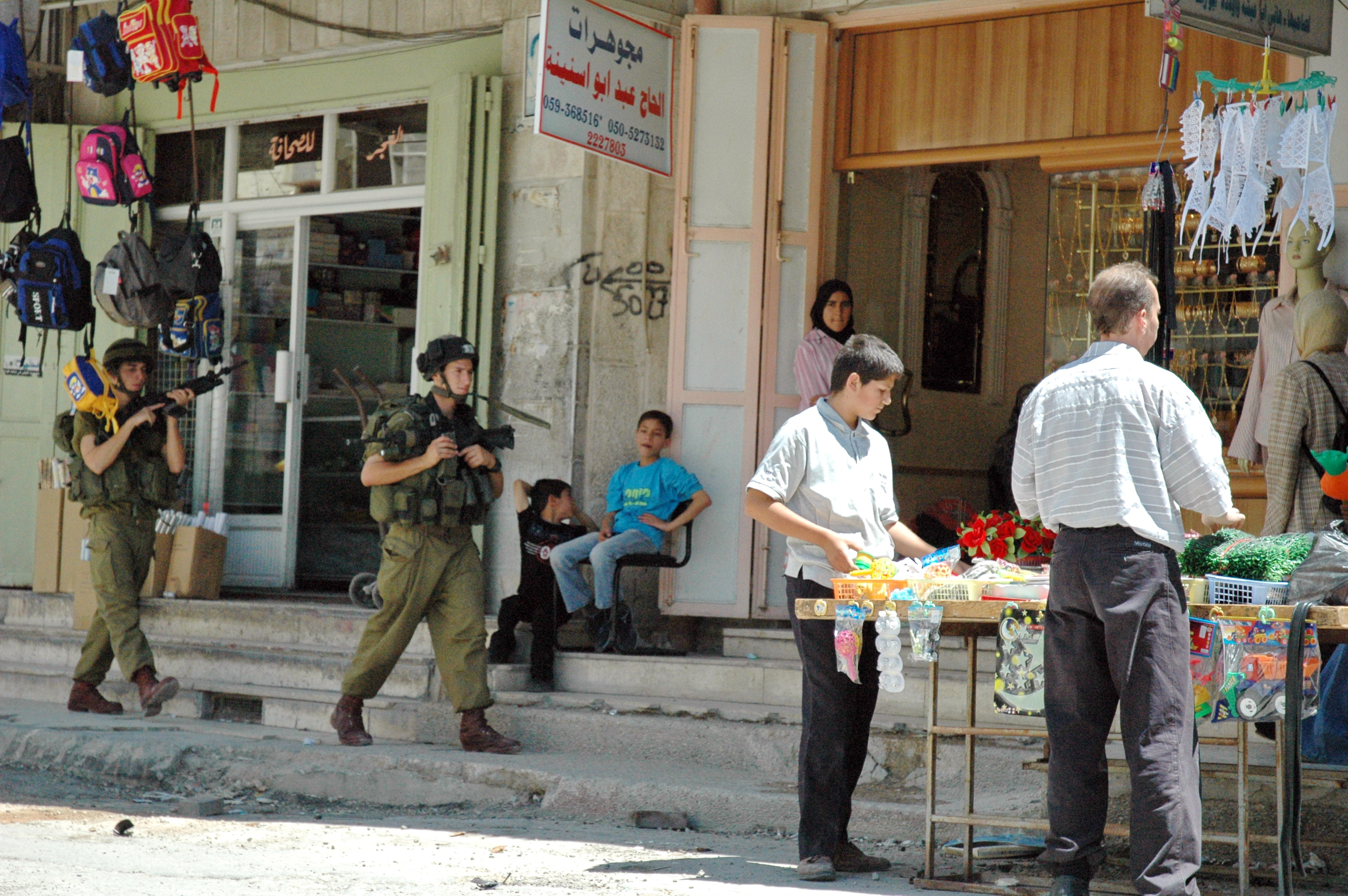
IDF soldiers patrol in Hebron

In November 2006, 50 Palestinian women responded to a Hamas radio appeal to act as human shields between Israeli soldiers and Palestinian gunmen hiding in a Gaza mosque. Women acted as a cover against Israeli troops allowing armed men occupying the Mosque to escape. 2 of these women were killed by Israeli forces. In two further instances in November 2006, civilians were called to protect sites known to be targeted for attack by the IDF, in one instance by the owner of the targeted home, Mohammedweil Baroud, a commander in the Popular Resistance Committee and by calls broadcast from local Mosques. The Human Rights Watch has condemned this behavior saying, "There is no excuse for calling civilians to the scene of a planned attack … Whether or not the home is a legitimate military target, knowingly asking civilians to stand in harm's way is unlawful".

Hakam Balawi has stated, "... It is prohibited to launch rockets and to fire weapons from houses, and that is a supreme Palestinian interest that should not be violated because the result is barbaric retaliation by the occupying army and the citizenry cannot accept such shooting. Those who do it are a certain group that does not represent the people and nation, doing it without thinking about the general interest and public opinion in the world and in Israel. There is no vision or purpose to the missiles; the Palestinian interest is more important" On the other hand, on 29 February 2008 Hamas parliamentarian Fathi Hammad spoke of a "death-seeking" culture where women, children and the elderly volunteer as human shields against Israeli military attacks. "[The enemies of Allah] do not know that the Palestinian people have developed its [methods] of death and death-seeking," Hammad is quoted by Memri in a speech televised on Hamas' Al-Aqsa television station. "For the Palestinian people, death has become an industry, at which women excel, and so do all the people living on this land. The elderly excel at this, and so do the mujahideen and the children," Hammad is quoted as saying. "This is why they have formed human shields of the women, the children, the elderly, and the mujahideen, in order to challenge the Zionist bombing machine. It is as if they were saying to the Zionist enemy: 'We desire death like you desire life,'" he said. The firing of Qassam rockets into Israel has been opposed by those living closest to the firing location due to Israeli military responses. On July 23, 2004, a family attempted to physically prevent the Al-Aqsa Martyrs' Brigades from setting up a Qassam rocket launcher outside their house. Members of the brigade shot one member of the family, an Arab boy, and wounded 5 others.

== See also ==
- Children in the Israeli–Palestinian conflict
- Human rights in Muslim-majority countries
- Islamism in the Gaza Strip
- Racism in the Palestinian territories
- Walid Husayin
- 2025 Hamas executions

List of human rights organisations § Palestine

  - Al Mezan Center for Human Rights (Gaza Strip)
  - Al-Haq (West Bank)
  - B'Tselem (Israeli)
  - Aswat (feminist)
  - Al Qaws (queer)
- LGBT rights in Palestine (Pinkwashing (LGBT) § Israel)
