= Killing of Ahmad Abu Murkhiyeh =

Gay Palestinian man killed in 2022

Ahmad Abu Murkhiyeh (Arabic: أحمد أبو مرخية, 1996/1997–2022) was a Palestinian man who was beheaded, and his body was found in Hebron in October 2022. Although the motive for the killing is unclear, it has been considered an anti-LGBT hate crime. His death led to outrage in Palestine and Israel and has been cited in discussions of LGBT rights in Palestine and the difficulties that LGBTQ Palestinian asylum seekers face in Israel.

== Background ==
Homosexuality is not illegal in the West Bank but is widely taboo. Documented anti-gay killings are rare; however, activists say some are disguised as accidents or linked to allegations of espionage. In 2023, Zuhair al-Ghaleeth was killed in the West Bank by militants over alleged treason. In a confession video that made the rounds on social media he claimed having been blackmailed by Israeli agents using a recording of him having sex with a man to coerce him to spy for them. Palestinian LGBTQ+ organizing has faced restrictions, including a police ban on events by the group Al Qaws in 2019. Prior to Abu Murkhiyeh’s murder, vigilante attacks on LGBTQ-linked events went unprosecuted, prompting many activists to retreat from public visibility.

In addition to facing homophobia, gay Palestinians may face mistrust from their communities, due to Israeli intelligence's practice of blackmailing gay Palestinians into becoming informants. Historically, Israel has granted non-Jews asylum only in rare cases and is especially reluctant to admit Palestinian asylum-seekers. However, it has occasionally provided protection to Palestinians who faced threats in the West Bank due to their gender or sexual identity.

== Asylum in Israel ==
Abu Murkhiyeh was originally from Hebron in the West Bank. His family claimed that he had lived and worked in Hebron and Jordan at the time of his death. However, The Times of Israel reported that people who knew him said that his family had physically abused him for years, and Israeli LGBTQ organizations reported that he had fled to Israel in 2020 out of fear for his life.

In the spring of 2021, Abu Murkhiyeh contacted Rita Petrenko, head of The Different House, an Israeli NGO aiding LGBTQ+ Palestinians. He said he had fled his family after being caught with another man and had been moving between cities in the West Bank under threat, including being shot at by a relative. After slipping through Israeli checkpoints, he spent two weeks homeless in Tel Aviv. Petrenko found his account credible and helped him obtain a temporary residency permit from Israeli authorities, who agreed he would face danger if returned to the West Bank.

According to Haaretz, Israel granted Abu Murkhiyeh a temporary permit to stay in Israel and apply for asylum elsewhere. An LGBTQ organization helped him apply for asylum in Canada. While in Israel, Abu Murkhiyeh continued to feel unsafe. He received threatening, homophobic phone calls and, at one point, was recognized and beaten by a day laborer from the West Bank. In Israel, Abu Murkhiyeh adopted the alias "Esso," which shelter counselor Asma Alssaad said refers to Esau, grandson of Abraham. She noted that many LGBTQ+ Palestinians use aliases to separate their former lives in the West Bank from their new identities in Israel and for safety reasons.

Abu Murkhiyeh stayed at multiple shelters for LGBTQ people, moving from one to the other and sometimes sleeping on the street due to limited shelter capacity. Because of restrictions for Palestinian asylum seekers in Israel, he was unable to work legally and had to do low-paying restaurant jobs. In December 2021, his temporary permit was extended by Israel four days after it had expired. In the interim, he was fired from his job. Although Israeli law changed to allow Palestinian asylum seekers to work in June 2022, Abu Murkhiyeh struggled to find steady employment. In August 2022, an Israeli advocate asked the UNHCR to expedite Abu Murkhiyeh’s resettlement request due to continued threats and delays. He had waited longer than other LGBTQ Palestinians for resettlement.

== Death ==
In early October 2022, Abu Murkhiyeh's head and torso were found near his family's house in Hebron. He had been beheaded. It is unknown how he came to be in the West Bank; some of his friends in Israel suspected he had been kidnapped. Some sources reported that the perpetrator had recorded and broadcast the killing on social media; others reported that videos of the crime scene were shared on social media.

=== Trial and investigation ===
Palestinian prosecutors charged a longtime friend of Abu Murkhiyeh with premeditated murder. According to the indictment, a family in Hebron witnessed the perpetrator stabbing Abu Murkhiyeh in the neck and dragging his body. Police were alerted by the perpetrator's father and found Abu Murkhiyeh decapitated in the backyard. The perpetrator attempted to flee but was arrested at the scene with blood on his hands and clothing. The autopsy revealed ten stab wounds to the neck and chest and revealed that decapitation occurred post-mortem.

During proceedings, his family claimed he suffered from schizophrenia triggered by prior drug use and lacked memory of the crime. According to NPR, the defendant had been examined in Bethlehem Psychiatric Hospital earlier that year, and the reports made by the hospital were found to be inconclusive by the court. A psychiatric evaluation ordered by the court had yet to be submitted as of September 2024. The case was delayed following the outbreak of the 2023 Israel–Hamas war. Israeli checkpoints hindered court access, the Palestinian Bar Association went on strike, and the accused and his lawyer missed multiple hearings. As of September 2024, proceedings remained ongoing.

At the same time, traditional justice mechanisms also handled the case. A sulh agreement (atwa) was reached four days after the murder, under which the perpetrator’s family paid 100,000 Jordanian dinars (approx. $141,000) to the victim’s family. Tribal arbitrators suggested that the victim’s sexual orientation, if proven, would reduce further compensation obligations. A final reconciliation was scheduled for January 2024 but had not occurred as of September 2024.

=== Motive ===
Police did not publicly reveal a motive, and the motive for the killing remains unclear. According to The Times of Israel, the killing was a "a gruesome manifestation of homophobic hatred" that was "motivated [...] by Abu Murkhiyeh’s sexual identity". The Jerusalem Post reported that his friends in Israel believed he was killed due to his sexual orientation. The BBC reported that his family "described the claims about the motive as rumour". Officials from the United Nations and a U.S. diplomat raised the case with the Palestinian Authority. Chief prosecutor Nashat Ayoush stated that investigators found no evidence linking the murder to Abu Murkhiyeh's sexual orientation, and said the issue of his sexuality was not raised during police interrogations.

According to an anonymous friend of Abu Murkhiyeh interviewed by NPR, he had been blackmailed by a man in Hebron who threatened to expose an intimate photo of him. The source said Abu Murkhiyeh had filed complaints before fleeing to Israel and later returned to Hebron to resolve the matter and prepare for resettlement abroad. The source also alleged that the accused killer had pursued Abu Murkhiyeh romantically, though Abu Murkhiyeh rejected him. The suspect’s father told NPR that his son had been diagnosed with schizophrenia and was under treatment with antipsychotic medication. He alleged that Abu Murkhiyeh had previously given his son the drugs that triggered the condition and claimed that on the day of the murder, Abu Murkhiyeh gave him another substance that may have caused a psychotic episode. According to the father, his son has no memory of the killing.

== Aftermath and reactions ==
Abu Murkhiyeh’s murder prompted widespread reactions in both Palestinian and Israeli media. His family released a statement calling his death a "heinous, unprecedented crime". In the West Bank, it was described as a “horrific crime” and a “new type of crime,” while some local voices avoided publicly addressing the motive. A mall and butcher shop owned by the suspect’s family were vandalized. A local Palestinian radio station said that the killing: "crossed every single red line in our society, whether in terms of morals, customs, or basic humanity." In Israel, media framed the killing as an anti-LGBTQ hate crime linked to his return to Palestinian territory. The day after his murder, a memorial was held in Tel Aviv by Palestinian LGBTQ+ asylum-seekers and Israeli advocates, where candles were lit in the shape of his name, "Ahmad," spelled in Hebrew.

The Palestinian LGBTQ community in Israel was "shaken" and "scared" by his death. Knesset member Ibtisam Mara’ana wrote in an op-ed that: "Ahmad’s murder does not interest the public in Israel or the Palestinian Authority. But it permeates the souls of Arab and Palestinian LGBTQ people, and they wonder who is next in line." His friends and supporters held memorial services in Israel. Elem, an Israeli LGBTQ organization who worked with Abu Murkhiyeh, stated: "We will never stop fighting so that others like you can live freely like any other human being." The US ambassador to Israel, Thomas Nides, condemned the killing on Twitter.

The BBC's article about Abu Murkhiyeh's killing states: "Homosexuality is rejected within the most socially and religiously conservative parts of both Palestinian and Israeli societies." After CAMERA filed a complaint, the BBC added: "but gay people in Israel can freely lead their lives".

News articles about Abu Murkhiyeh's killing have highlighted limited LGBT rights in Palestine, and the OHCHR mentioned his death in a report about human rights in Palestine. His death has been referenced in op-eds that criticize the LGBTQ community in the US for supporting Palestine. Additionally, his story has been used to illustrate the difficulties faced by LGBTQ Palestinians who seek asylum in Israel, including financial insecurity and safety concerns. During the 2023 Israel–Hamas war, the case reemerged in public discourse. Pro-Israel campaigns cited it as evidence of anti-LGBTQ violence under the Palestinian Authority, while critics accused Israel of exploiting such cases to deflect attention from its war crimes.

== See also ==
- Human rights in Palestine
- LGBT rights in Israel
- LGBT rights in Palestine
