= CyberDissidents.org =

- Founded: 2008; 18 years ago
- Location: New York City, United States
- Fields: Human rights
- Director: David Keyes

CyberDissidents.org is a division of Advancing Human Rights, a 501 (c) (3) non-profit organization. CyberDissidents.org focuses on the human rights of online political activists. The group believes that highlighting the plight of individual democratic dissidents in the West affords a measure of protection against government oppression.

== Profile ==
Founded in 2008, CyberDissidents.org originally focused on autocratic Middle Eastern countries. The organization's co-founder and director, David Keyes, served previously as coordinator for democracy programs under Soviet dissident Natan Sharansky. Keyes has written for The Washington Post, The Wall Street Journal, The New Republic, The Daily Beast, National Review, The Jerusalem Post and other publications.

The organization aims to utilize the findings of psychology professor Paul Slovic who studied the phenomenon of indifference in the face of humanitarian disasters. Professor Slovic has written that highlighting individuals is the most effective way of provoking sympathy and concern for a cause. This is seen in the organization's "Featured CyberDissident" which focuses on a particular dissident's story.

== Board of advisors ==
- Ahmad Batebi, Chairman
- Saad Eddin Ibrahim
- Irwin Cotler
- Natan Sharansky
- Peter Deutsch
- Nazanin Afshin-Jam
- Abdul Wahid al-Nur
- Samer Libdeh

Bernard Lewis served on CyberDissidents.org's board of advisers for the first two years of its existence.

In 2011, Keyes partnered with founding chairman emeritus of Human Rights Watch, Bob Bernstein, to form Advancing Human Rights.

== Activities ==
On June 11, 2010, Keyes hosted a panel in the United States Congress. The briefing was held in the Committee on Foreign Affairs and addressed the issue of technology, Internet and access to independent media in Iran. Former Iranian deputy Prime Minister in Political Affairs, Mohsen Sazegara, and former senior director for Middle East Affairs in the National Security Council, Michael Singh joined the briefing.

CyberDissidents.org sparked international controversy following an op-ed authored by the organisation's director on February 16, 2010, in The Wall Street Journal criticizing Turkey's ban on YouTube, which launched a protest movement in Turkey. According to PBS, Keyes' piece which was written from Istanbul, caused the Turkish newspaper Milliyet, together with other leading Turkish papers, to initiate a protest campaign to draw attention to the ban on YouTube. Shortly after the publication of Keyes' article, Turkish president Abdullah Gul came out against the ban.

The organization has been featured in a wide array of press, including The Boston Globe, The Wall Street Journal, Voice of America and Alhurra television.

In 2008 and 2009, CyberDissidents.org coordinated global protests at Egyptian embassies and university campuses in the United States, Canada and Israel in support of Egyptian blogger Abdul Kareem Nabil Suleiman (also known as Kareem Amer), who was jailed in 2007 for criticizing Egyptian President Hosni Mubarak and "insulting Islam". CyberDissidents.org board member and former Soviet dissident Natan Sharansky supported the protests, stating that "freedom of speech is an inalienable right. Suppressing that right contravenes human decency and makes a mockery of the democratic ideal."
