= David Keyes =

Israeli spokesman

- דוד קיז
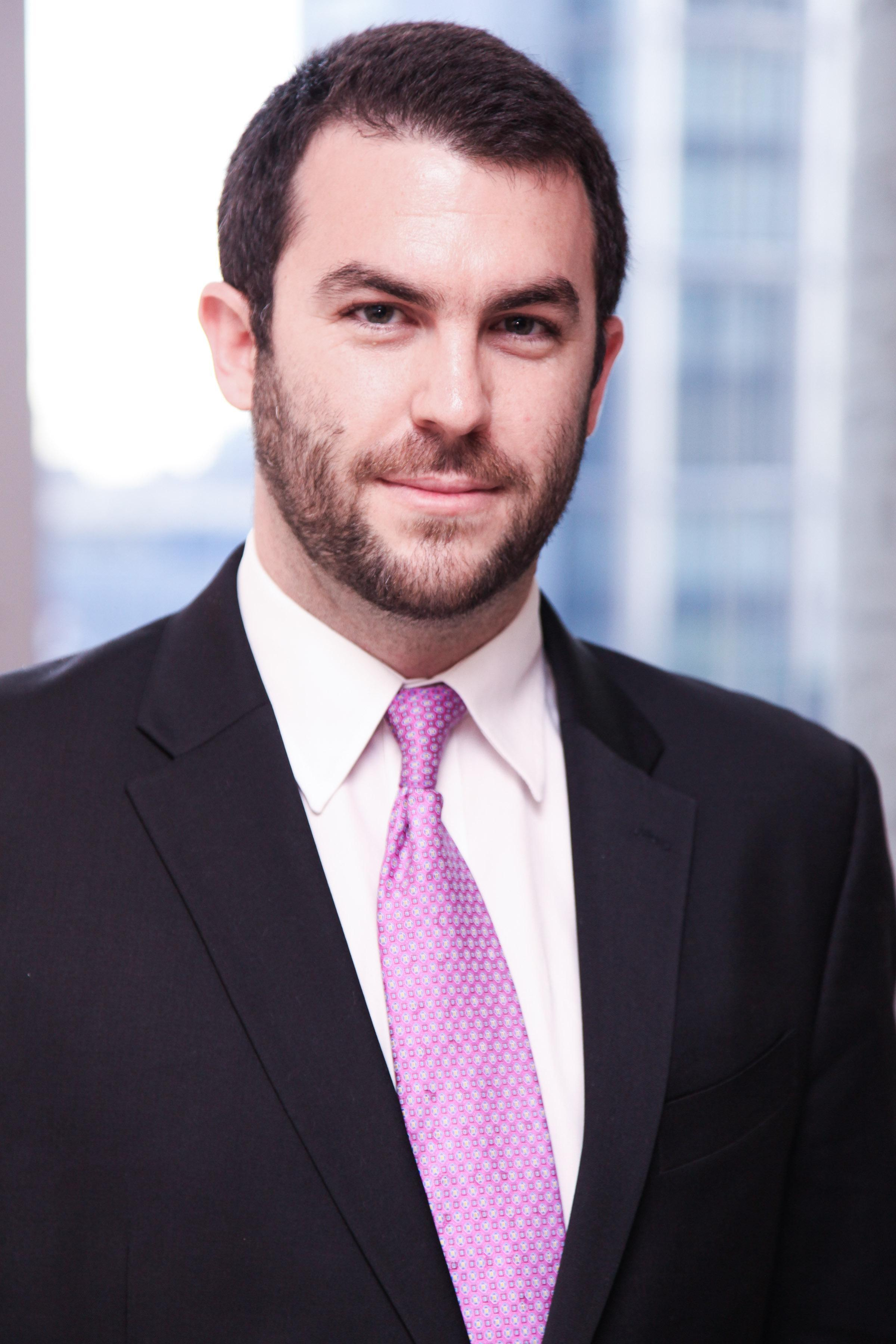
- Born: Los Angeles, California, U.S.
- Citizenship: American, Israeli
- Education: UCLA; Tel Aviv University
- Occupation: Former foreign media advisor to Benjamin Netanyahu
- Predecessor: Mark Regev
- Successor: Evan Cohen

David Keyes (/kiːz/; Hebrew: דוד קיז) is an Israeli-American public relations representative and human rights activist. Keyes was the executive director of Advancing Human Rights, the co-founder of CyberDissidents.org, and the head of Movements.org, a platform for crowdsourcing human rights. The New York Times called Keyes "a pioneer in online activism."

From 2016 to 2018, Keyes was the foreign media advisor to Israeli Prime Minister Benjamin Netanyahu. In December 2018, Keyes resigned from his role as Netanyahu's spokesperson following allegations of sexual misconduct, which he denied.

== Early life ==
Keyes was born in Los Angeles, California. He attended Shalhevet High School and University High School. In his youth, he was a top-ranked tennis player in California and played in the junior national championships. He once trained with Andre Agassi and wanted to be a professional tennis player.

Keyes graduated with honors from the University of California, Los Angeles with a degree in Middle Eastern studies. While in college, he ran a group called Students Against Dictators and wrote for the UCLA newspaper, the Daily Bruin. In 2004, Keyes conducted research at the Jerusalem Center for Public Affairs, where he specialized in terrorism and assisted Dore Gold, Israel's former ambassador to the United Nations. In 2005, Keyes was a research intern at the Washington Institute for Near East Policy. He studied Arabic in Cairo in 2006. After immigrating to Israel, Keyes served in the Strategic Division of the Israel Defense Forces and completed a master's degree in diplomacy at Tel Aviv University. He is fluent in Hebrew and Arabic.

== Career ==
=== Human rights activism ===
While working for former Soviet dissident Natan Sharansky in Israel, Keyes founded CyberDissidents.org, a site meant to "highlight the voices of democratic online activists in the Middle East." CyberDissidents was a database and a platform for dissidents who wanted to reach a wider audience. Keyes was a keynote speaker at a conference on internet freedom organized by former President George W. Bush. In his speech, Keyes laid out his agenda to make dissidents more well-known.

In 2008, Keyes condemned the Egyptian government for jailing bloggers who publish criticism of the government. Keyes organized a protest at the Egyptian embassy in Tel Aviv to decry the ongoing detention of Egyptian blogger Kareem Amer. The assistant Egyptian consul emerged to speak with the protesters and claimed he had no knowledge of Amer's imprisonment. In 2014, Keyes called for "maximum pressure on the Egyptian government to uphold civil liberties."

In February 2010, Keyes published an op-ed in the Wall Street Journal criticizing the ban on YouTube in Turkey. Keyes wrote that Turkey's status as a "European Capital of Culture" should be suspended until the YouTube ban was repealed. The op-ed sparked a protest movement for free speech in Turkey after it was reprinted in Turkish media. In October 2010, the Turkish government lifted the YouTube ban but continues to periodically restrict access to the site.

In 2010, Keyes was approached by Robert L. Bernstein, the founder of Human Rights Watch. Bernstein was interested in finding new ways to open closed societies. Bernstein said Keyes was "a source of knowledge about all issues in the Middle East." Bernstein saw potential in CyberDissidents and asked Keyes to help establish a new group called Advancing Human Rights.

In 2011, Keyes proposed holding a Saudi Women's Grand Prix in order to protest the ban on women driving in the kingdom, where some women have been sentenced to lashing for driving. Keyes said that the goal of his campaign was to encourage the Saudi king to empower Saudi women and allow them to leave home without a man's permission. Keyes became well known in Saudi Arabia for being behind the campaign to allow Saudi women to drive. During an interview on MSNBC, Keyes displayed a whip that Saudi authorities use to lash women who are convicted of leaving home without a male relative. The senior editor of Commentary called Keyes' campaign for Saudi women's rights "the cleverest human-rights campaign of 2011."

In 2012, Keyes became the head of Movements, an online platform for human rights activists founded in 2008 by Jared Cohen, the director of Google Ideas. Cohen said his group was looking for a partner and reviewed many human rights organizations before approaching Keyes. Cohen said he was impressed with Keyes' "phenomenal network of cyberactivists in the Middle East and North Africa." With Keyes at the helm, Movements declared June 2013 to be "Dictator Appreciation Month" – an initiative that highlighted human rights activists who use satire. Keyes reintroduced Movements in 2014 as a platform for crowdsourcing human rights. Less than one year later, Tablet magazine wrote that what Movements did for human rights was "what Amazon did to shopping or Craigslist to ads."

In 2013, Keyes confronted Iranian Foreign Minister Javad Zarif in New York about human rights in Iran. Keyes asked Zarif when Majid Tavakoli, one of Iran's most prominent student activists, would be freed from prison. Zarif responded: "I don't know him." Soon after, thousands of Iranians took to social media to demand to know how it was possible that their foreign minister was unaware of his nation's most famous political prisoners. As a result of the uproar, Tavakoli was granted leave from prison. Keyes said he was "totally overjoyed" that his confrontation with Zarif led to Tavakoli's release.

On 13 November 2013, Keyes co-authored an op-ed in The Wall Street Journal with Garry Kasparov, a former presidential candidate in Russia and former world chess champion. The article launched Keyes' new initiative, Dissident Squared, to rename the streets in front of the embassies of dictatorships after political prisoners. The Daily Beast cited Keyes as the "brainchild" of Dissident Squared and said it had "earned the support of major human rights luminaries and fighters for freedom around the world."

In 2014, Keyes was the driving force behind the bipartisan effort in Congress to rename the street address of the Chinese embassy in Washington, DC, to No. 1 Liu Xiaobo Plaza, after the famed Chinese dissident and Nobel Peace Prize winner. The Washington Post reported that Chinese officials demanded that the U.S. administration bury the bill. The issue threatened to become a major irritant in U.S.-China relations.

In 2016, Keyes was awarded the Charles Benton Digital Equity Champion Award.

==== Satirical stunts ====
Keyes is a fellow at the Disruptor Foundation, an organization whose mission is to raise awareness of disruptive innovation theory and encourage its application in order to bring about changes in society.

In 2015, Keyes increased his use of humor and satire in order to highlight the human rights records of various countries. He published a number of videos documenting his "punkings" of Saudi and Iranian diplomats.

In April 2015, Iranian Foreign Minister Javad Zarif gave a talk at New York University. Outside the hall, Keyes led a "celebration" of a milestone: Iran hanging 1,000 prisoners in 18 months. Keyes parked a van on the street and offered free ice cream to passers-by. The theme of the mock celebration was, "Free ice cream; free Iran’s political prisoners."

In May 2015, the Saudi Arabian Cultural Mission announced that its annual job fair would be taking place at the Gaylord National Resort and Convention Center. Keyes used the opportunity to protest Saudi Arabia's treatment of homosexuals and threw a "big gay party" in the lobby of the Gaylord. Keyes also prodded Saudi Arabia in a video called "Abdullah: Let Your Women Drive." He delivered his address in fluent Arabic.

In summer 2015, Keyes ambushed Iranian diplomats at the nuclear negotiations in Vienna and asked them on camera, "Who's your favorite political prisoner, if you could only pick one?" In a hallway inside the hotel, Keyes told Wendy Sherman, the chief US negotiator in Vienna, "Wendy, congrats on all the success of reducing the rate of hangings in Iran hopefully to only once every two-and-a-half hours."

=== Spokesman for the Israeli Prime Minister ===
In March 2016, Keyes was named the Prime Minister of Israel's spokesperson to foreign media. Keyes replaced Mark Regev, who became Israel's ambassador to the United Kingdom. A senior official close to Israeli Prime Minister Benjamin Netanyahu actively recruited Keyes for the position. Before his appointment, Keyes was known as a "wunderkind of online activism."

Keyes boosted Netanyahu's performance on social media. Over the next few months, Netanyahu published a series of videos that garnered nearly 40 million views. The Jerusalem Post reported that Netanyahu's viral videos "bear the hallmark of David Keyes."

Keyes was credited with writing Netanyahu's viral video response to the Orlando nightclub shooting in June 2016. In the video, Netanyahu said the casualties were victims of homophobia and intolerance and called on people not to give in to "hate and fear." Netanyahu called on people to embrace the LGBT community, "comfort them, tell them you stand together, we stand together as one, and that you will always remember the victims." The Financial Times called the video "a masterclass in responding to tragedy." The video was seen by more than 22 million people. It was the most-watched video statement ever put out by Netanyahu. Keyes told the New York Times in September 2016 that the eight videos he produced for Netanyahu had over 42 million views.

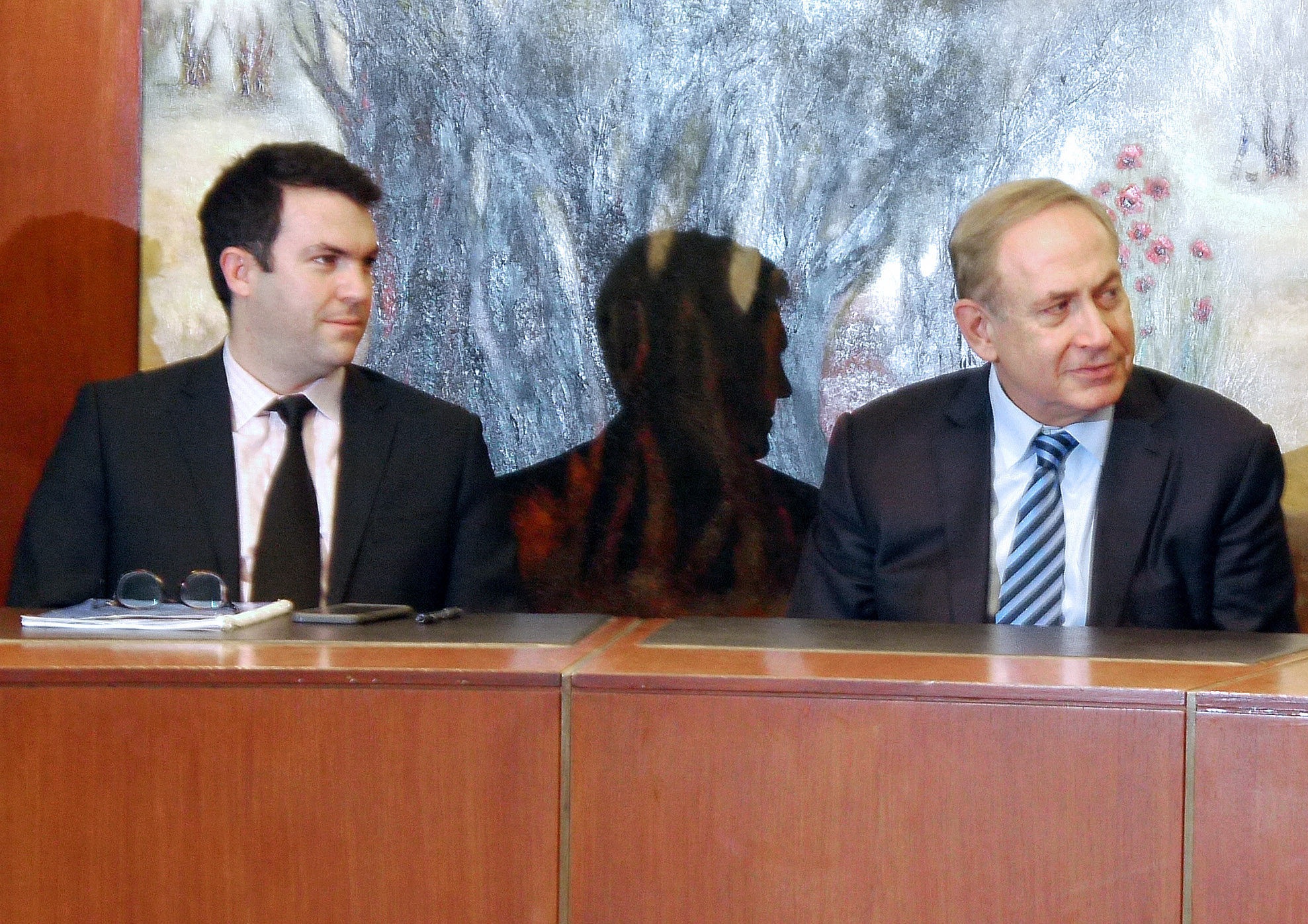
David Keyes and Israeli Prime Minister Benjamin Netanyahu, 4 December 2016.

In December 2016, Keyes said that Israel had "ironclad" information from sources in the Arab world that the Obama administration helped craft a UN Security Council resolution condemning Israel for housing construction in the West Bank and eastern Jerusalem and "pushed hard" to ensure its passage. Keyes said on CNN that it was outrageous that the Security Council resolution considered the Western Wall to be part of "occupied Palestinian territory."

In February 2018, an armed Iranian drone infiltrated Israeli airspace from Syria and was shot down by the Israeli Air Force. Keyes proposed that Netanyahu display a piece of the drone at the upcoming Munich Security Conference. Keyes stashed the drone piece under the podium before Netanyahu's speech. While delivering his remarks, Netanyahu brandished the wing flap from the Iranian drone and asked, "Mr. Zarif, do you recognize this? You should. It's yours." Netanyahu's display grabbed headlines around the world and inspired memes on social media. Iranian Foreign Minister Javad Zarif called Netanyahu's prop a "cartoonish circus" that "does not even deserve the dignity of a response." Netanyahu said the fact that Zarif was forced to respond was "the whole point" of the display and a public relations win. Keyes was credited for his role in shaping the prime minister's media strategy.

In April 2018, Keyes said that Yaser Murtaja, a Palestinian photographer killed by Israeli soldiers during demonstrations on the Gaza border, was a Hamas officer who used his drone to collect intelligence on Israeli positions. "I saw the intelligence myself," Keyes said. "There is not a scintilla of doubt."

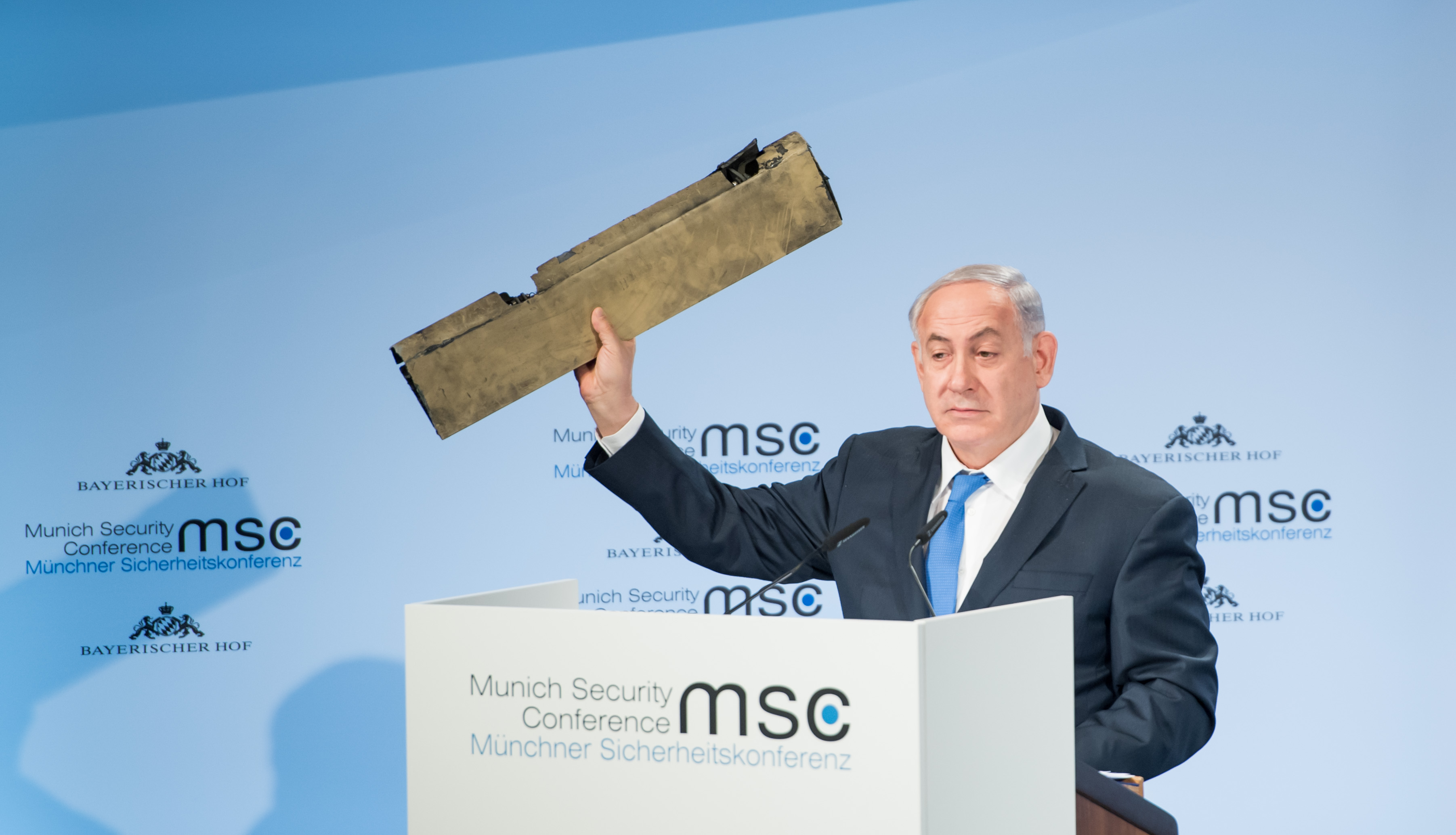
Israeli Prime Minister Netanyahu displays a piece of an armed Iranian drone that was shot down over Israel after infiltrating from Syria. The idea to display the drone piece came from David Keyes.

In June 2018, Keyes was credited with producing a viral video in which Netanyahu offered to share Israeli water technology with Iran, which suffers from severe drought. "The Iranian people are the victims of a cruel and tyrannical regime that denies them vital water," Netanyahu said. "Israel stands with the people of Iran and that is why I want to help save countless Iranian lives." The video received five million views in five days. In addition, nearly 100,000 Iranians joined the Israeli government's Persian-language Telegram account in a 24-hour period. The video received wide media coverage in Iran, and many Iranian people reacted positively. The Iranian government responded to the video by rejecting Netanyahu's offer of help. Keyes said that the main goal of publishing videos about Iran was to "[r]each out directly to the Iranian people and show them that Israel is their friend, not – as the Iranian regime says – their enemy." Eli Lake, a foreign policy columnist for Bloomberg, credited Keyes' "revolutionary pedigree" from his time as a human rights activist for encouraging Netanyahu to speak directly to the Iranian people.

In July 2018, Keyes crafted a video for Netanyahu that called on the world to help Iranians improve their lives by standing up to "a regime that oppresses them and denies them a life of dignity, prosperity, and respect." Netanyahu told the story of an imaginary 15-year-old girl called Fatemeh whose daily life is full of hardships. The video was viewed more than 1.5 million times in ten days on Netanyahu's social media accounts. Fox News' Sean Hannity put the video on the top of his Twitter feed for more than 16 hours, where US President Donald Trump, along with Hannity's 3.6 million other followers, would likely see it.

An Iranian student seeking political asylum in the United States said that Netanyahu's video messages to the Iranian people "resonated with many Iranians" and "made Israel popular in Iran."

In July 2018, Keyes was reported to be the leading candidate to replace Danny Danon as Israel's ambassador to the United Nations.

Keyes resigned from his position in December 2018 following accusations of sexual misconduct, which he denied.

==== Controversy ====
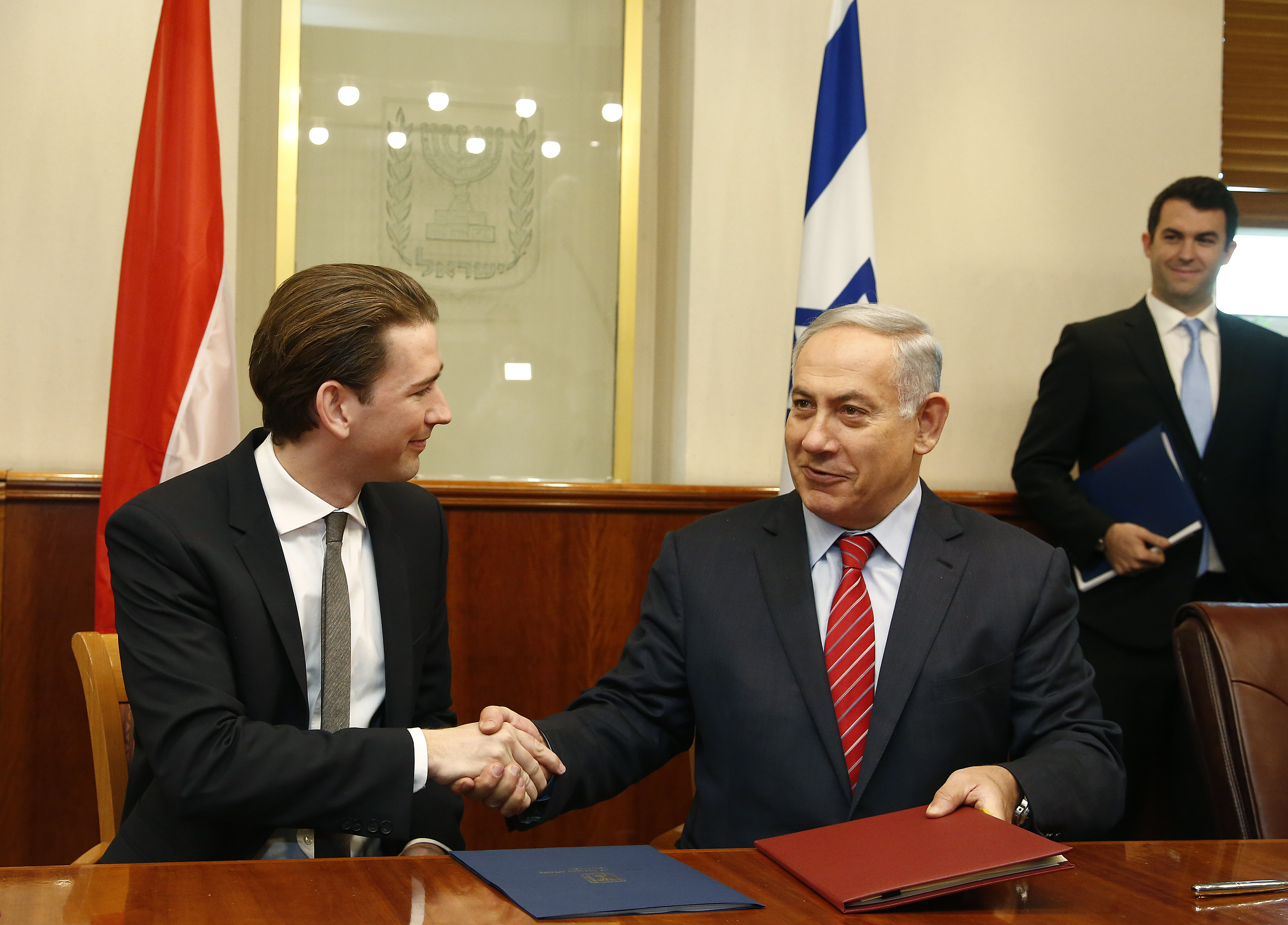
Keyes looks on as Israeli Prime Minister Benjamin Netanyahu and Austrian Foreign Minister Sebastian Kurz sign a memorandum of understanding, 16 May 2016.

Before Keyes formally began his role as Netanyahu's spokesman, he underwent a lengthy vetting process for the job that brought him into the prime minister's inner circle. As part of the vetting process, Keyes passed a polygraph test during which he was asked questions about whether he was involved in any criminal or sexual offenses. In April 2016, one day after Keyes posted his first official tweet as Netanyahu's spokesperson, an anonymous complaint of sexual assault against Keyes was reported in Israeli media. The Jerusalem Post reported at the time that the complaint came from an anti-Israel activist who was denied entry to Israel in 2014. Keyes unequivocally denied the allegation.

In September 2018, New York Senate candidate Julia Salazar publicly accused Keyes of sexual assault. Salazar said she did so in order to preempt a planned story by The Daily Caller that she learned about beforehand which would have named her as the anonymous complainant from April 2016. Keyes denied her allegations, saying, "This false accusation is made by someone who has proven to be repeatedly dishonest about her own life. This is yet another example of her dishonesty."

Following these reports, a total of fourteen additional women subsequently came out with allegations of improper behavior; ten of them remained anonymous. One report said that in 2013, Keyes had been barred from entering The Wall Street Journal opinion section's offices without appointment due to complaints made by female employees. Bret Stephens, then the deputy editor of the Wall Street Journal's opinion section, called Keyes a "disgrace to men" and "a disgrace as a Jew" in barring him from the office, and Keyes later sent apology emails "for being less than gentlemanly." Another woman, a North American immigrant to Israel, described an "aggressive, sexual advance", which she described in detail, made by Keyes weeks after he became Prime Minister Benjamin Netanyahu's spokesperson for the international media. Israel's Channel 10 reported that two female employees at the Washington, DC, think tank Foundation for Defense of Democracies had also complained to their superiors about Keyes having "harassed" them in 2013. In response, Keyes said that "all of the accusations are deeply misleading and many of them are categorically false."

In September 2018, the Israeli Civil Service Commission looked into the complaints voiced about Keyes. The commission also investigated the role of Israeli Ambassador to the United States Ron Dermer, who had acknowledged that he was warned that Keyes was likely to be a threat to women working at the Prime Minister's office, but failed to alert the relevant authorities. Two months later, the commission closed its case, with its spokesperson stating that while Keyes may have acted improperly, it did not constitute a criminal or disciplinary offense. "There is no evidence or even a snippet of evidence to indicate a disciplinary offense or an act that constitutes sexual harassment by Keyes during the time he served as a civil servant," the commission said in a letter, but that its decision "does not determine anything regarding other questions that were raised concerning the allegations against Keyes, including the question of whether he is fit to serve in his role." The commissioner, Prof. Hershkovitz explained that his reason for closing the enquiry was that the alleged offences had taken place before Mr Keyes was a government employee and that no criminal complaint had been registered with the police. On 12 December 2018, Keyes resigned from his post. Keyes released a statement after his resignation, saying, "I thank the Israel Civil Service Commission for closing its probe against me, stating 'There is no evidence or even a shred of evidence' of wrongdoing as an employee of the government."

Following Keyes's resignation, Netanyahu published a statement praising Keyes for his work saying, "I thank David Keyes for his great contribution to Israel's information effort. David pioneered groundbreaking videos which presented basic facts about Israel and enabled me to present Israel's policies to a global audience. Millions of people around the world viewed these videos with appreciation, and the messages aimed at the Iranian public were received with particular enthusiasm by many Iranian citizens. All this attests to David's talents and his contribution. I wish him much success on his future course."
