= Rauda Morcos =

Palestinian poet and lesbian activist

- روضة مرقس
- Born: Kafr Yasif, Israel
- Citizenship: Israeli (Palestinian)
- Organization: Aswat
- Known for: LGBTQ activist

Rauda Morcos (Arabic: روضة مرقس; Hebrew: ראודה מורקוס) is a Palestinian–Israeli lesbian poet and LGBTQ activist, who grew up in Haifa. In 2003, she was outed as a lesbian by a national newspaper, leading to dismissal from her job, physical assaults, and her car being damaged. She then helped other women in setting up Aswat, the first Palestinian group dedicated to supporting lesbians, which she initially led. “Most of the members” of Aswat, would be considered Israeli Arabs by governmental entities as they live within current borders of Israel. However, as an organization, Aswat emphasizes its connection to the West Bank and Gaza, identifying as a group for “Palestinian gay women.”

== Education ==
Raudo Marcos holds two different degrees. Her first degree is a Bachelor of Laws (LL. B) and the second is Masters in Law and Human Rights Law (LL.M). Specifically, alongside her Masters at the Émile Zola Chair for Human Rights, she was a part of the first "Takkanah" Program.

== Career ==
In 2003, Morcos was interviewed for Yedioth Ahronoth (an Israeli tabloid newspaper) about her poetry, and lost her job as a youth educator. During the interview, in passing she mentioned her sexuality. She said the journalist promised not to reveal her sexual orientation but then outed her as a lesbian, which led to her being assaulted and her car being damaged many times. She received anonymous threats and was concerned for her life.

Morcos then joined other women in 2000 in an online forum that started the regular meetings in 2001 and set up Aswat ("Voices"; which she has formerly led) in 2003 as an organisation supporting lesbians and bisexual, inter-sex, queer, transsexual, transgender, and questioning women, the only group for Arab lesbians in the Arab region. It was based in Haifa, and was the first regional group to offer support to lesbian Palestinians.

Morcos said that: "When we started Aswat, I remember the Islamic Movement issued a boycott against us as well as a fatwa [an Islamic religious legal order] against me personally, because according to them I was ‘the snake’s head.’" In 2004 the group had 14 members. In 2007, when Aswat had about 30 members and held its first conference, the Islamic Movement in Israel (a grouping of Arab Muslims) publicly called for the meeting to be cancelled and urged its community "to stand against the campaign to market sexual deviance among our daughters and our women." Sheikh Ibrahim Sarsur, head of the Islamic Movement in Israel, said: "Our community does not tolerate this kind of behaviour. The consensus feels it is kind of a disease that must be healed ..."

The International Gay and Lesbian Human Rights Commission (now OutRight Action International) presented its Felipa de Souza Award to Morcos in 2006, recognising her work with Aswat. She was the first Arab person to receive the award. Aswat held its first conference in Haifa in 2007, with 350 attendees.

Taking a post-colonial stance, Morcos has argued that human rights aid organisations from the United States and Western Europe can be patronising to Arab communities. She has also spoken of links between Israeli repression of Palestinians and gay people, criticising the Israeli LGBT rights movement for not focusing more upon it. She commented that "I think the Palestinian identity and the Queer identity converge in being both marginalized and they are both about resisting oppression".

Morcos also said "I know that the Israeli law is among the most developed in the world, but this doesn’t mean that it is applied in reality." She added: "I know it’s not easy to be gay in the West Bank, but it’s not easy being gay in ... the U.S.A. And it’s not easy to be gay in Israel (except in Tel Aviv)."

Morcos has worked as a regional advisor for organisations including the Astraea Lesbian Foundation for Justice, the Coalition of Women for Peace, the Global Fund for Women, Human Rights Watch and Mama Cash. As of 2012, she was working freelance for Hivos, a Dutch development aid organisation, and pursuing a law degree at the Carmel Academic Center in Haifa.

== Activism ==
Morcos said in 2008 that gay Palestinians are sometimes blackmailed by Israeli intelligence into outing them if they do not collaborate.

In August 2020, Morcos spoke about a positive change in the Palestinian community's treatment of LGBTQ members after the funeral of Ayman Safieh, who was a leading member of the Palestinian queer community.

== See also ==
- LGBT in Islam
- LGBT rights in the State of Palestine
- LGBT rights in Israel
