= LGBTQ rights in Palestine =

- Map of Palestine: the West Bank (right) and the Gaza Strip (left) are highlighted in green
- Legal status: Mixed legality: West Bank – legal since 1951, equal age of consent; Gaza Strip – unclear (see "Legal status and criminal law" section)

Family rights
- Recognition of relationships: No recognition of same-sex couples

Homosexuality in Palestine is considered a taboo subject, with LGBTQ people often experiencing persecution and violence. There is a significant legal divide between the West Bank and the Gaza Strip, with the former having more progressive laws and the latter having more conservative laws. Shortly after the Jordanian annexation of the West Bank in 1950, same-sex acts were decriminalized across the territory with the adoption of the Jordanian Penal Code of 1951. In the Egyptian-administered Gaza Strip and under Hamas' rule, however, no such initiative was implemented.

== Legal status and criminal law ==
On 18 September 1936, the criminal code of Mandatory Palestine, British Mandate Criminal Code, which drew from Ottoman law or English law, was enacted. Section 152(1)(b)(c) of the code states that any person who "commits an act of sodomy with any person against his will by the use of force or threats" or "commits an act of sodomy with a child under the age of sixteen years" is liable for imprisonment up to 14 years, while Section 152(2)(b) states that anyone who has "carnal knowledge" of anyone acting "against the law of nature" is liable for a prison term up to 10 years. Palestinian academic Sa'ed Atshan argued that this criminal code was an example of British export of homophobia to the Global South. The present applicability of this law is disputed. The Human Dignity Trust states that the criminal code is still "in operation" in Gaza albeit with scarce evidence of its enforcement, and Human Rights Watch states that the criminal code is still "in force" in Gaza. Amnesty International does not report same-sex sexual activity as being illegal in any Palestinian territory but emphasizes that Palestinian authorities do not stop, prevent or investigate homophobic and transphobic threats and attacks. The editor-in-chief of the Palestinian Yearbook of International Law, Anis. F. Kassim argued that the criminal code could be "interpreted as allowing homosexuality."

The decriminalization of homosexuality in Palestine is a patchwork. On the one hand, the British Mandate Criminal Code was in force in Jordan until 1951, with the Jordanian Penal Code having "no prohibition on sexual acts between persons of the same sex," which applied to the West Bank, while Israel stopped using the code in 1977. On the other, the Palestinian Authority has not legislated either for or against homosexuality. Legalistically, the confused legal legacy of foreign occupation – Ottoman, British, Jordanian, Egyptian and Israeli – continues to determine the erratic application or non-application of the criminal law to same-sex activity and gender variance in each of the territories. A correction issued by the Associated Press in August 2015 stated that homosexuality is not banned by law in the Gaza Strip or West Bank, but is "largely taboo," and added "there are no laws specifically banning homosexual acts."

In 2018, Human Rights Watch noted that laws in the West Bank and the Gaza Strip include a combination of unified laws passed by the Palestinian Legislative Council and ratified by the President of Palestine, and stated that laws from the former British Mandate, Egypt, and Jordan still apply when unified laws have not been issued. However, HRW added that Hamas has issued separate decrees and has not applied presidential decrees by the President of Palestine. Also, the organization reported that articles 258 and 263 of the draft penal code, in 2003, for Palestine, contained "provisions that criminalize adult consensual same sex conduct". However, it is not known whether this code, which prohibited sexual intercourse with women who are over 18 in an "illicit manner" with imprisonment, a prison term of up to five years if they are related to the said woman or up to ten years for those who engage in rape, and up to five years in prison for a male who "commits the act of sodomy with another male", was implemented. There have also been attempts by the Gazan legislative body, following Hamas's takeover of Gaza, to "amend or replace the British Mandatory Penal Code" with a proposed change in 2013, including "flogging for adultery" but it did not pass the legislature.

== Civil rights and violence ==
According to Equaldex, "[t]here are no broad legal protections from discrimination provided to LGBTIQ+ people in Palestine." Additionally, there have been relatively few murders of LGBTQ (or allegedly LGBTQ) people in Palestine, and the victim's sexuality was the primary motive in a case in April 2023, noted below.

=== West Bank ===
In August 2019, the Palestinian Authority announced that LGBTQ groups were forbidden to meet in the West Bank on the grounds that they are "harmful to the higher values and ideals of Palestinian society". This was in response to a planned conference in Nablus by Al-Qaws, a Palestinian LGBTQ group. Following backlash, the ban was later withdrawn.

In October 2022, Palestinian police arrested a suspect who beheaded a 25-year-old male Palestinian, Ahmad Abu Murkhiyeh, who was seeking asylum in Israel "because he was gay." At the time, it was reported that 90 Palestinians who identified with the LGBTQ community lived "as asylum seekers in Israel".

=== Gaza Strip ===
The Islamist militant group Hamas took control of the Gaza Strip in June 2006, and has controlled the territory since then.

Before the Gaza War, scholar Timea Spitka stated that in Gaza police do not act against queerphobic violence, domestic violence is not criminalized, and civil society organizations, which protect women and children, are reported to be "vulnerable to attack." Spika added, in a related article, that this vulnerability has "been exploited by Israel," noting a connection between the Israeli occupation, lack of security and protection for women and non-heterosexual people, and lack of rule of law. In 2019, Haaretz interviewed four gay men and one gay woman living in Gaza, who recounted their experiences: one man recounted his rough treatment by Hamas members, while others said they feared being arrested, outed, then forced into heterosexual marriage by their families. All four said that social media was a "game changer" in meeting other LGBTQ individuals, but some feared catfishing by undercover Hamas or Israeli intelligence agents. Gay men who flirt with Israeli soldiers on dating apps worry about being catfished by Hamas's security services.

Some interpretations of Palestinian law say that it does not outlaw consensual gay sex between adults. Anis. F. Kassim (editor-in-chief of the Palestinian Yearbook of International Law) said that Palestinian law (even in Gaza) could be interpreted as allowing non-commercial sex between consenting adult men.

=== Israel ===
It has been reported that the hostilities LGBTQ Palestinians face has led to many seeking refuge in other countries, including Israel. The Israeli LGBTQ organization The Aguda stated in 2013 that around 2,000 Palestinian homosexuals live in Tel Aviv "at any one time."

However, the complex legal status of Palestine results in almost no assistance from most countries afforded to LGBTQ Palestinians. Some have reported that while hundreds of them have fled to Israel, they have been subject to house arrest or deportation by Israeli authorities. According to +972 Magazine, LGBTQ Palestinians seeking refuge in Israel "are routinely excluded from programs that are meant to secure basic healthcare for other asylum seekers" and that "their access to basic social rights such as shelter is also blocked." In June 2022, Israel began issuing work permits for gay Palestinian refugees, who had been granted asylum, and those "fleeing domestic violence." Prior to the rule change, the Israeli government resisted changing the terms for issuing permits, fearing it would "encourage more Palestinians to flee to Israel and seek asylum."

In mid-2022, the Israeli government told the Israeli High Court that LGBTQ Palestinians from the West Bank who were "fleeing persecution" could work in Israel but that their presence was only temporary "in order to find a permanent solution in the [West Bank] or in another country." A month after the murder, The Times of Israel noted that gay Palestinians who leave the West Bank, with public opinion polls indicating low tolerance for homosexuality, and arrive in Israel are faced with "an existence filled with dizzying uncertainties and life-threatening hazards." The article went on to say that such Palestinians have various escape routes to Israel, but that making them eligible for permanent residency includes "working with Israeli security forces" although those forces have been accused of blackmailing Palestinians into becoming informants for Israeli intelligence services; only "select few who have passed on invaluable knowledge" are granted this kind of permit, which requires the sign-off of the prime minister.

== Health ==
HIV prevention and care are inadequate: HIV-positive queer individuals often do not receive continuous antiretroviral therapy due to the limited availability of medication and the high level of social stigma. One of the central problems is the lack of comprehensive epidemiological surveillance. Between 1988 and 2017, only 98 cases of HIV/AIDS were officially registered in Palestine, including 79 AIDS cases and 19 HIV-positive individuals. The actual number is likely much higher, as societal taboos and religious norms hinder comprehensive data collection.

The 2023 Gaza War since October 2023 has dramatically worsened the situation for queer people living with HIV in Gaza. In addition to familial rejection and social stigma, the collapse of the healthcare system has made access to life-saving HIV medication especially difficult. International aid efforts have frequently failed due to Israeli blockades and confiscations.

== Israeli–Palestinian conflict ==
=== Activism ===
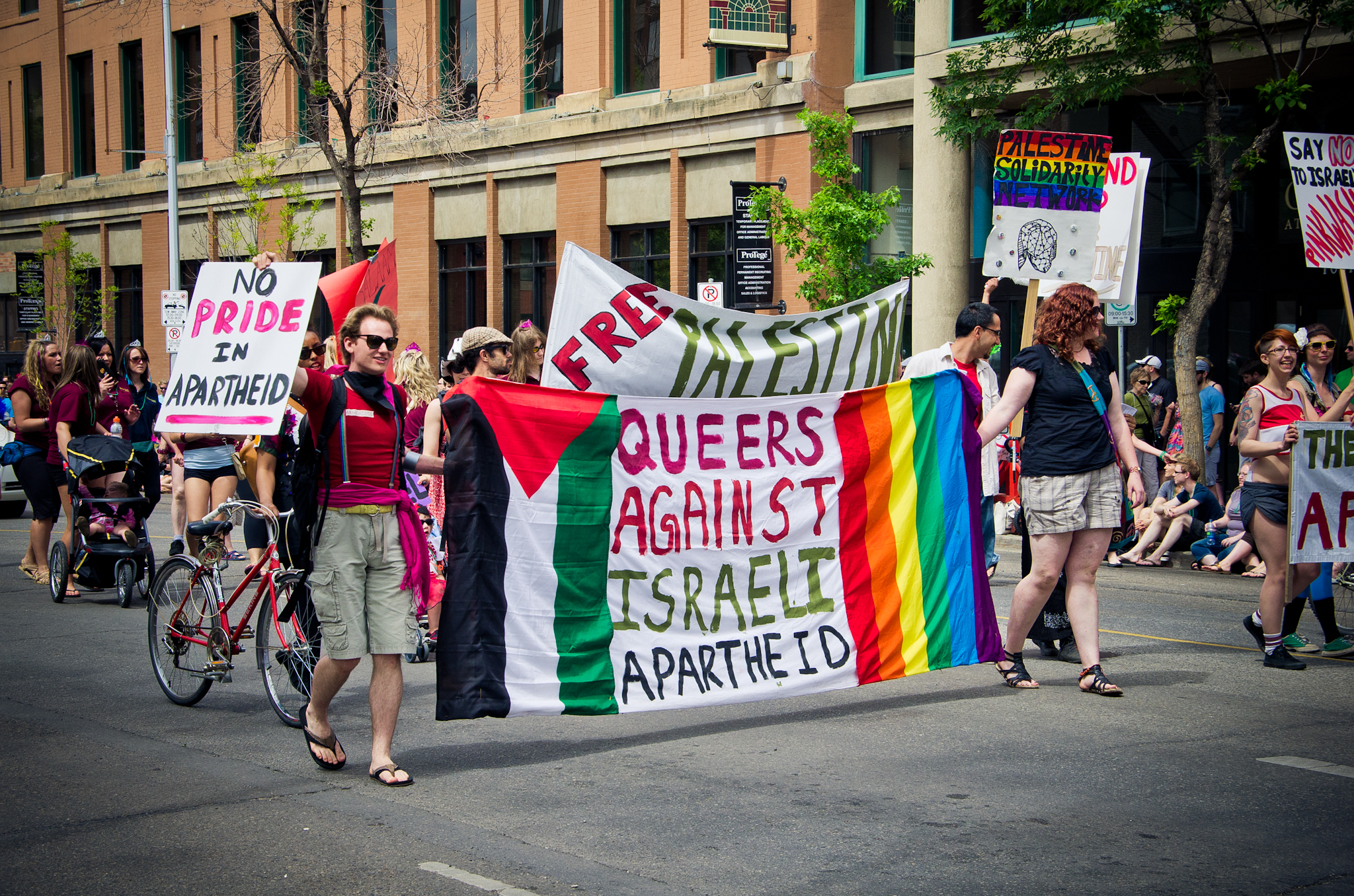
Protesters with sign Queers Against Israeli Apartheid in Edmonton (2011)

In 2010, the organization Palestinian Queers for Boycott, Divestment, and Sanctions (PQBDS) was formed, aimed at challenging Israeli representation of gay life in Palestine and pinkwashing. They also run a website called Pinkwatching Israel.

Palestinian queer organizations such as Al Qaws describe themselves as "queer-feminist" and anti-colonial in regards to the Israeli-occupied territories, and caution against rendering all of the progressive forces inside Palestine invisible, including erasing the queer Palestinian movement's achievements, describing it as a form of violence. In relation to a ban on conversion therapy in Israel, activists such as Maisan Hamdan criticized the conservative Islamic Movement, which is active in Israel and parts of the Knesset, who voted against the ban. Hamdan states that the sole effort of the movement is Palestine's liberation, without inclusion of LGBTQ rights, and stated that these two efforts (liberating Palestine and liberating queer people) should proceed together.

During the 2023 Gaza war, some LGBTQ Palestinians shared information in anonymously geotagged posts on Queering the Map, a community-based online collaborative and counter-mapping platform. It was said by Time that this provided a "rare glimpse" into perspectives of queer Palestinians, with many messages expressing solidarity with the Palestinian cause. Others stated that Palestinians were sharing their "last words" on the platform.

=== Alleged blackmailing by the Israeli military ===
There have been reports that Palestinian Authority police kept files on gay Palestinians and that Israeli intelligence has blackmailed gay Palestinians into becoming informants. In 2014, 43 veterans of the Israeli Intelligence Corps signed an open letter alleging that Unit 8200 used coercive intelligence tactics on Palestinians, including using information on sexual orientation. HIAS has claimed that "there are ample testimonies and records that LGBTQ living in the Palestinian Authority are persecuted over suspected collaboration with the Israeli security services."

In April 2023, it was reported that Zuhair Relit (also known as Zoheir Khalil Ghalith), a Palestinian living in Nablus, was killed by the Lions' Den militant group for collaborating with the IDF. Relit alleged he was blackmailed into becoming an informant for the Israeli military, with his confessional video on social media claiming that Shin Bet had an "illicit video" showing him doing something sexual with a male partner. He was later executed by the Lions' Den group. Persecution of – and discrimination against – suspected gay men by Al Qassam and the police in Gaza is also largely attributable to them being suspected informants.

== LGBTQ rights activism ==
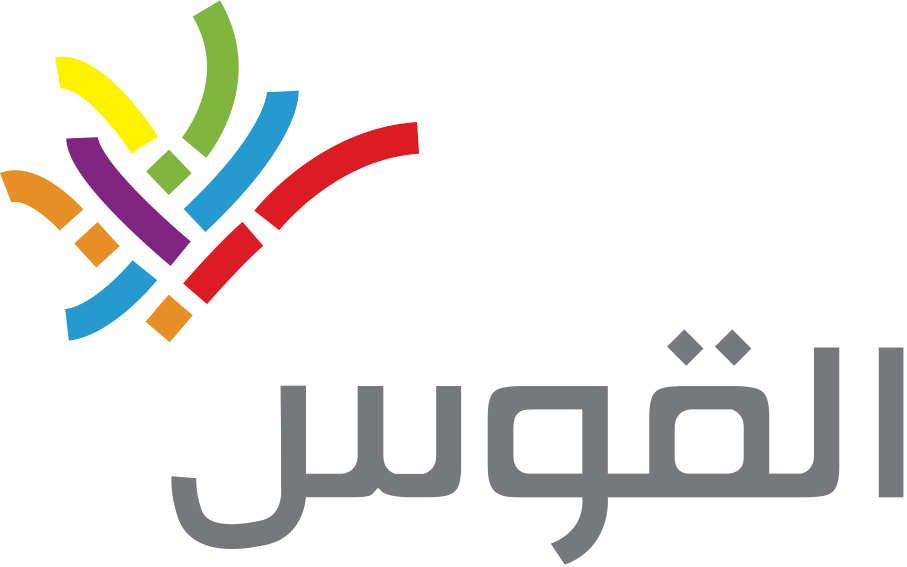
Logo of Al Qaws, the leading organization for Palestinian LGBTQ rights. The group was briefly banned in 2019 before being reinstated after a backlash.

In the early 2000s, two established groups formed to provide support to lesbian, gay, bisexual, trans, queer, and questioning (LGBTQ) Palestinian people living within the borders of Israel, the Gaza Strip, and the West Bank. Al Qaws ("The bow" in Arabic, referencing a rainbow), the first official Palestinian LGBTQ organization, was founded in 2001 as a community project of the Jerusalem Open House for Pride and Tolerance to specifically address the needs of LGBTQ Palestinian people living in Jerusalem.

In 2015, a Palestinian artist named Khaled Jarrar painted a rainbow flag on a section of a West Bank wall, and a group of Palestinians painted over it. Jarrar said that he painted the rainbow flag to remind people that although same-sex marriage was legalized in the United States, Palestinians still live in occupation, and criticized the paint-over, stating that it "reflects the absence of tolerance, and freedoms in the Palestinian society". As of 2025, it operates from within Israel.

=== Aswat ===
In 2002, a second group formed to specifically address the needs of Palestinian lesbian women, named Aswat ("Voices" in Arabic), was founded and based in Israel as a project of the Palestinian feminist NGO Kayan, at the Haifa Feminist Center. Aswat started as an anonymous email-list serving to provide support to Palestinian gay women, and developed into an established working group, translating and developing original texts related to gender identity and sexuality into Arabic. Aswat's efforts brought results, while also facing multi-faceted challenges. In 2003, co-founder Rauda Morcos was outed by the Israeli tabloid Yedioth Ahronoth after agreeing to an interview, despite asking her sexual orientation not be included in the article, which led to significant personal backlash.

In 2007, Aswat held its first public conference in Haifa, Israel: 350 people attended the event, which marked the first five years of the organization's existence and the publication of a new book in Arabic about lesbian and gay identity. The conference was reported to be problem-free, although it met opposition by the Islamic Movement in Israel (a grouping of Arab Muslims), which publicly called for the meeting to be cancelled, and urged its community "to stand against the campaign to market sexual deviance among our daughters and our women" resulting in some 30 people protesting outside the venue; the same group issued a fatwa against Rauda Morcos because, Morcos said, "according to them I was 'the snake’s head'".

Nisreen Mazzawi, co-founder of Aswat, stated that LGBTQ Palestinians, being stateless, face "oppression, whether conscious or unconscious, also within Israeli organizations" because "LGBTQ Israelis identify with the state even before their queer identity, and they will not stand with LGBTQ Palestinians simply because both are queer. They will fight against Jewish homophobes, but ... (LGBTQ) Palestinians will remain on their own". In 2004, Aswat had 14 members. In 2007, the group, which includes women from the West Bank and Gaza, had 30 active members and about 50 women participating in the email list. Like Al Qaws, Aswat operates from within Israel.

== Summary table ==
Same-sex sexual activity legal	West Bank: Yes Legal since 1951 for males; always been legal for females Gaza: Males (and females): No consensus on legal applicability of British 1936 Sexual offences provisions to homosexual conduct and said to not be not banned by law; unclear if 2003 code reportedly criminalizing said activities was implemented or not
Equal age of consent	West Bank: Yes (18 years); Gaza: For males / Yes For females
Anti-discrimination laws in employment only	Yes (but only in some contexts)
Anti-discrimination laws in the provision of goods and services	Not known
Anti-discrimination laws in all other areas (incl. indirect discrimination, hate speech)	(no protection from housing discrimination)
Same-sex marriages	No (not recognized)
Recognition of same-sex couples	No (not recognized)
Joint adoption by same-sex couples	No (can only be done by a single individual, not couples)
Gays and lesbians allowed to serve openly in the military	(Palestine does not have a military)
Right to change legal gender	No
Gender-affirming care	No (restricted previously to intersex people, not available due to destruction from Gaza war)
MSM allowed to donate blood	Yes

== Public opinions ==
Polls of public sentiment towards LGBTQ people in Palestine find it is overwhelmingly negative. A Global Acceptance Index (a measure of the relative level of social acceptance of LGBTI people and rights) report ranked Palestine at 130, noting that very little change in acceptance occurred between 2010 and 2020.

=== Islamist opposition ===
The Palestinian Mujahideen Movement (the political wing of the Mujahideen Brigades) and the Rightly-Guided Caliphs Assembly for Da'wah have been critical of UNRWA promoting what the groups see as un-Islamic values, including LGBTQ issues.

== See also ==
- Human rights in Palestine
- LGBTQ rights in Israel
- LGBTQ rights in the Middle East
- LGBTQ rights in Asia
