= Movements.org =

Online platform

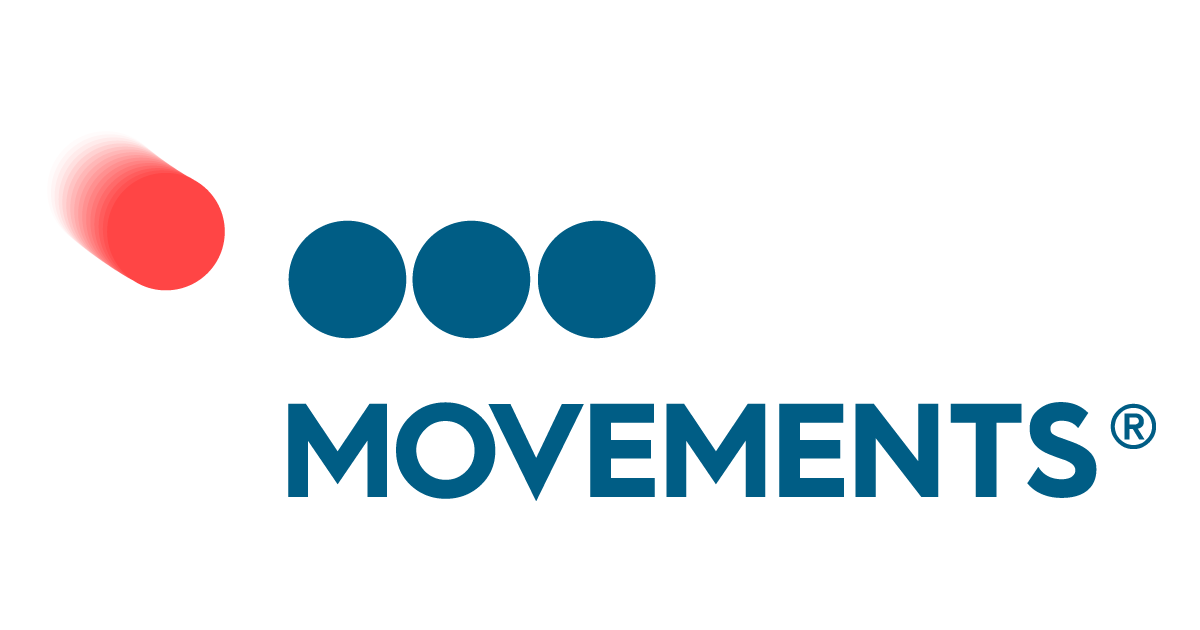
Movements logo

Movements.org is an online platform working to connect activists worldwide. It was founded when The Alliance for Youth Movements rebranded itself in 2011. It is an online marketplace that connects dissidents in closed societies to individuals in open societies with experience in such areas as legal work, mathematics, science, media, PR and technology. When activists post requests for assistance, experts and professionals respond with offers of assistance.

== History ==
In October 2008, Columbia University, the US Department of State, Google, Howcast Media and other media companies sponsored the inaugural Alliance of Youth Movements Summit. This event brought together digital activists, technology and media leaders, non-governmental organisations (NGOs), and governments to convene, share best practices, and create a network of socially responsible grassroots activists using technology for their movements and campaigns.

Following the inaugural summit, Jason Liebman (CEO and co-founder of Howcast), Roman Tsunder (co-founder of Access 360 Media), and Jared Cohen (Director of Google Ideas at Google) co-founded the Alliance for Youth Movements. This organization was dedicated to identifying, connecting, and supporting digital activists at the annual summit and throughout the year.

In December 2009, The Alliance for Youth Movements hosted its 2nd annual summit in Mexico City. This summit was sponsored by the US Department of State as well as other sponsors. The event convened activists and supporters interested in how social media and connection technologies were helping to combat violence, with a special focus on Latin America.

In March 2010, The Alliance for Youth Movements hosted its 3rd annual summit in London, which was sponsored by the UK Home Office and other media companies. At the end of the summit, it was announced that the Alliance for Youth Movements was launching a new online hub for digital activism, Movements.org.

In February 2011, Movements.org officially launched and the Alliance for Youth Movements re-branded itself as Movements.org.

In June 2012, Movements.org formally became a division of Advancing Human Rights (AHR), created in 2010 by Robert L. Bernstein (the founder of Human Rights Watch and former president and CEO of Random House for twenty-five years). AHR focuses on freedom of speech, women’s rights and promoting the freedoms outlined in the Universal Declaration of Human Rights, particularly by leveraging the power of the Internet. In 2016 Movements.org separated from Advancing Human Rights and is an independent project managed with the help of Democracy Council.

In August 2012, Movements.org in collaboration with Al Jazeera launched an interactive tool that tracks the defections of senior Syrian military officials, members of parliament and diplomats of Assad's regime. The tracker was released on Al Jazeera.

On July 9, 2014, Movements.org launched as a marketplace site, where dissidents in closed societies could connect to legal, PR and technology experts in open societies.^{[7][1]} Natan Sharansky said of the platform, “Too often, leaders of the Free World have proved to be a disappointment to today's dissidents. The citizens of free nations don't need to.”

== Mission and activities ==
Movements.org enables the exchange of skills and resources between activists and experts. Activists can post short descriptions of their projects and needs, while legal and other experts provide assistance using their special skills. Movements received support from Google Ideas in its start-up phase, and from Ronin Analytics in the design of its digital security perimeter. Since its launch in July 2014, Movements.org has announced partnerships with SaferVPN - a software provider, which has committed to make free VPN subscriptions available for activists in closed societies, and Youth Service America who run events to empower young people to engage in volunteer work. Dissident users of Movements have regularly published original content in The Daily Beast. Movements.org currently has over 20,000 users from up to 140 countries. The website is available in English, Arabic, Chinese, Ukrainian, Russian, Persian and French.
