= Advancing Human Rights =

American human rights organization

Advancing Human Rights (AHR) is an international non-governmental organization that conducts research and advocacy on human rights. AHR's stated objective is to "leverage the tools of democracy to support those fighting for human rights in closed societies." AHR aspires to empower these dissident voices by utilizing crowd sourcing and technology to allow activists around the world to connect to the tools, resources and expertise they need to succeed.

It is the parent organization of Movements.org.

== Profile ==
Advancing Human Rights (AHR) was created in 2010 by Robert L. Bernstein, the founder of Human Rights Watch long-time President and CEO of Random House, and David Keyes. AHR focuses on freedom of speech, women's rights and promoting the freedoms outlined in the Universal Declaration of Human Rights.

== Programs ==
Advancing Human Rights (AHR) currently runs multiple programs: CyberDissidents.org, Dissident Squared, and Movements.org.

CyberDissidents.org's stated mission is to support human liberty by promoting the voices of online dissidents. CyberDissidents.org archived and cataloged the writings of international dissident bloggers in order to provide an outlet for expression and to help circumvent censorship.

Dissident Squared is an AHR campaign with the mission of renaming the streets in front of the embassies of closed societies in honor of imprisoned or killed dissidents. In June 2014, Dissident Squared was supported by members of Congress in their campaign to rename the street in front of the Chinese embassy "Liu Xiaobo Plaza."

Movements.org was founded in 2007 to support online human rights activists. In 2012 a grant from Google enabled Movements.org to be taken under the management of AHR. Also in 2012, Movements.org began a collaboration with Al-Jazeera, to launch an interactive tracking tool that tracks the Syrian Defections of senior military officials, members of parliament and diplomats of Assad's regime. The tracker was released on Al Jazeera and can be found here. On July 9, 2014, Movements.org launched as a marketplace site where dissidents in closed societies can connect to legal, PR, and technological experts in open societies.

== Issues ==
- Freedom of Expression
- Women's rights
- Religious freedom
- Open education
- Internet activism
- Hate speech
- LGBT rights
- Human rights groups' accountability
