= Ghadir Shafie =

Palestinian activist

- غدير الشافعي
- Born: Acre, Israel
- Citizenship: Israel
- Occupation: Co-director of Aswat
- Children: 1

Ghadir Shafie (also Ghadir Al Shafie, Arabic غدير الشافعي) is an Arab Israeli activist and feminist. She is the co-director of Aswat, an organization of queer Palestinian and Arab Israeli women, which she joined in 2008.

== Views ==
Shafie is a critic of pinkwashing by Israel. She has criticized Israeli efforts to promote LGBT rights to Palestinians, writing that these efforts ensure "that sexuality education is only delivered condescendingly by non-Palestinians to Palestinians" and cannot account for language and cultural differences. In an interview with Middle East Eye, she said that “[the] moment we represent ourselves as gay Palestinians and speak about politics, it’s the end of the story” and that Israel wants queer Palestinians "to be the victims of our own society, and they want to be the saviours.”

Shafie is a supporter of Boycott, Divestment and Sanctions, describing it as "the only effort that acknowledges and emphasizes the need to recognize our rights as Palestinians." She has opposed performances in Israel and the Palestinian territories by artistic groups from Arab countries, citing the Brand Israel campaign as a reason. Her advocacy work involves anti-Zionism.

== Activity ==
In 2011, Sarah Schulman organized a speaking tour in the United States with Shafie as well as Haneen Maikey and one other queer Palestinian activist. The speakers held events in six cities in February 2011.

In March 2015, Shafie attended a conference titled "Sexualities and Queer Imaginaries in the Middle East/North Africa" and held by the Middle East Studies program of the Watson Institute for International Studies at Brown University. She spoke as part of a panel focused on Palestine.

In May 2016, Shafie was one of the signers of a statement by Palestinian feminist activists supporting the decision of the National Women's Studies Association to support the Boycott, Divestment and Sanctions movement.

== Personal life ==
Shafie was born and raised in Acre, Israel. She lives there with her son Jude.

Shafie is queer and a citizen of Israel. She has described experiencing racism and discrimination from Jewish Israelis in Israeli cities.
