= Howcast =

Educational technology website

Howcast Media, Inc.
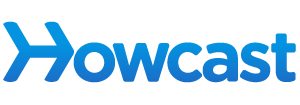

- Screenshot of Howcast.com home page
- Company type: Privately held company
- Website type: Educational technology how-to
- Available in: English; Spanish
- Founded: February 6, 2008; 18 years ago
- Headquarters: New York City; San Francisco, United States
- Key people: Jason Liebman (Co-founder) & (CEO); Daniel Blackman (Co-founder) & COO); Sanjay Raman (Co-founder) & (Vice President of Product Development); Darlene Liebman (Co-founder) & (Vice President of Production)
- Website: www.howcast.com
- Registration: Optional (Required to upload, comment, add favorites)
- Launched: February 6, 2008; 18 years ago
- Current status: Active

Howcast is a dormant educational technology website that provides instructional short-form how-to video and content that combines practical information with various filmmaking techniques such as humor, claymation and animation. The how-to content is created in-house, through its Emerging Filmmakers Program, media content partners and individual contributors. Its Emerging Filmmakers Program allows emerging filmmakers to apply to make videos for Howcast.com and are compensated by receiving $50 a video and 50% of the advertising revenue generated from videos that generate over 40,000 views.

The site currently has over 100,000 videos in its library and works with partners like Playboy, JetBlue, Nestle and the US Department of State.

Content from Howcast.com spans 25 categories with a wide variety of topics, ranging from "How to Write a Resume" to "How to Survive a Bear Attack" to even virtually impossible situations like "How to Survive an Alien Abduction".

Howcast.com was launched on February 6, 2008, by co-founders and former Google employees Jason Liebman, CEO, Daniel Blackman, COO and Sanjay Raman, VP of Product Development and Darlene Liebman, VP of Production, with offices in New York City and San Francisco.

Its investors include Tudor Investment Corporation.

The site was named one of the "50 Best Websites of 2008" by Time magazine and a top undiscovered web site by PC Magazine. In 2009, Howcast was nominated for two Webby Awards in the How-to and travel categories. In 2010, Howcast was nominated as the finalist in Top 100 Websites of 2010 by PCMag.

== Emerging Filmmakers Program ==
Launched in February 2008, the Howcast Emerging Filmmakers Program (EFP) offers film students, recent grads, and up-and-coming filmmakers the chance to gain experience, exposure, and some extra income by creating short how-to videos distributed across online, mobile, and offline platforms. Provided with the guidance of Howcast producers, filmmakers are encouraged to flex their creative muscles while building their professional reels and launching their online careers. Filmmakers choose from ready-to-shoot scripts in numerous categories. Each script includes pre-recorded voiceovers, animated graphics, and music tracks so that filmmakers can focus on the creative aspects of shooting and editing their videos. Every accepted video earns a stipend of $50 and if a video is a success on Howcast.com, there are opportunities for revenue sharing.

Since many filmmakers in the program are film students, the EFP has partnered with film and television programs at Boston University, Flashpoint Academy, and Charles Sturt University to expose students to Web-video production, increase student awareness of opportunities online, as well as provide real-world experience working for clients. Expanding its reach beyond traditional educational borders, the EFP also launched a pilot program in the West Bank in partnership with the State Department to introduce young Palestinians to Web video.

== Mobile applications ==
Howcast has developed free, native applications for the iPhone, iPad, and Android-powered phones to allow mobile searching and viewing of Howcast videos. The Howcast for iPhone application launched in November 2008 and received more than 500,000 downloads by May 2009. Howcast for iPhone, was the first how-to video iPhone application created and was featured in the Apple iPhone commercial "Itchy". In May 2009, CNET named the app one of "five free iPhone apps that can improve your life". In July 2009, Times Online named the Howcast for iPhone app one of its ten best iPhone apps. Howcast for Android launched in early November 2009 with a positive reception.

Additionally, Howcast launched an app for iPad in June 2010.

== Projects ==
Howcast partnered with Facebook, Google, YouTube, MTV, the Department of State and Columbia University to host the Alliance of Youth Movements Summit in December 2008 that brought 17 youth movements that had used social media to combat oppressive regimes. Participants included Oscar Morales (One Million Voices Against the FARC), Save Darfur and The Genocide Action Network. The Summit resulted in the launch of a 501c3 The Alliance of Youth Movements and a published field manual: Creating Grassroots Movements for Change, which incorporated the findings from the December summit.

== See also ==
- Alliance of Youth Movements
