= Palestinian land laws =

Ownership of land under the Palestinian National Authority

Palestinian land laws dictate how Palestinians are to handle their ownership of land under the Palestinian National Authority—currently only in the West Bank (see Gaza Strip under Hamas). Most notably, these laws prohibit Palestinians from selling any Palestinian-owned lands to "any man or judicial body corporation of Israeli citizenship, living in Israel or acting on its behalf". These land laws were originally enacted during the Jordanian rule of the West Bank, which began after Jordan's partial victory during the 1948 Arab–Israeli War and ended after the sweeping defeat of the Arab coalition to the Israeli military during the 1967 Arab–Israeli War, following which the territory was occupied by Israel. Land sales by Palestinians to Israelis are considered treasonous by the former to the Palestinian national cause because they threaten the aspiration for an independent Palestinian state. The prohibition on land-selling to Israelis in these laws is also stated as enforced in order to "halt the spread of moral, political and security corruption". Consequently, Palestinians who sell land to Israelis can be sentenced to death under Palestinian governance, although death penalties are seldom carried out; capital punishment has to be approved by the President of the Palestinian National Authority.

== Background ==
Israel captured the West Bank from Jordan and the Gaza Strip from Egypt during the Six-Day War of 1967. Under international law as interpreted by the Palestine Liberation Organization, Jordanian laws as they existed on 4 June 1967 (the eve of the occupation) are applicable to the West Bank, including East Jerusalem, and Israel as an Occupying Power is obliged to respect these laws.

Shortly after the war, Israel began establishing settlements in these territories based on the legal opinion of Plia Albeck, in contradiction with legal advice of others, including from Theodor Meron, the Israeli Foreign Ministry's advisor. In 2005, Israel dismantled its settlements in the Gaza Strip, but Israeli settlements in East Jerusalem, along with their security zones, still account for about 60% of the area. In the West Bank, settlements have continued to slowly grow and as of April 2009, included about 400,000 settlers. All Israeli settlements in the occupied territories (including those in East Jerusalem) are considered illegal by the international community, but Israel disputes this.

Palestinians argue that the growth of Israeli settlements compromises their ability to establish a viable state of their own in the territories, in accordance with the proposed two-state solution. In April 2009, a Chief Islamic Judge of the Palestinian Authority reminded of an existing fatwa that bans Palestinians from selling property to Jews, which is considered high treason and punishable by death.

== Land sale to non-Palestinians ==
The Negotiations Affairs Department of the State of Palestine (PLO-NAD) declared in 2008, that all transactions with Israelis and other foreigners transferring confiscated land in the Occupied Territories violate international law and are null and void. It stated that under the Hague Regulations an occupant may only administer public property as a usufructuary and does not gain sovereignty or title over any part of occupied territory. Israel thus has no right to sell Palestinian state land, nor does it have a right to lease state land for long periods or for the purpose of settlements. According to the PLO-NAD, the Palestinian government of the future Palestinian state will not be under any obligation to honour Israeli transactions in occupied Palestinian property that took place during Israel’s occupation.

== Property transactions under Palestinian law ==
In a 2009 case, in which a Palestinian was convicted of selling land to foreigners, it appears that some additional laws were used to obtain the conviction. The Jerusalem Post states that the defendant was convicted under a law prohibiting sale of Palestinian land to "the enemy" (possibly a reference to the old Jordanian law), as well as a Palestinian "military law" which, according to the Jerusalem Post, "states that it is forbidden to sell land to Jews", and two earlier laws dating from the 1950s which forbade trade with the state of Israel.

While Palestinian Authority courts can impose death sentences, they cannot be carried out without the approval of the PA President. The current President, Mahmoud Abbas, has consistently refused to approve executions. In September 2010, a Palestinian court reaffirmed that the sale of Palestinian land to Israelis is punishable by death. The Palestine General Prosecution said that the ruling represented "a consolidation of the previous legal principle," and that the "ruling aimed to protect the Palestinian national project to establish an independent Palestinian state."

== Effects ==
Sources differ on the number of Palestinians officially executed for the offence, with the Jerusalem Post stating that none have been executed while a BBC report indicates that there have been two executions. However, a number of extrajudicial killings have also taken place since the death penalty was first announced. In May 1997 for example, three Palestinians convicted under the statute were later found murdered. Human Rights Watch argued that the circumstances of the murders "strongly suggested official tolerance if not involvement" by the PA, citing as evidence "inflammatory statements" by PA Justice Minister Frei Abu Medein "which seemed to give a green light to violence against suspected land dealers." Medein is quoted as saying: "... expect the unexpected for these matters because nobody from this moment will accept any traitor who sells his land to Israel."

In 1998, Amnesty International reported that torture of those accused of selling land to Israelis appeared to be systematic, and unlawful killings were also reported against those accused.

An additional consequence has reportedly been increased intimidation of Palestinian Christians, as many ordinary Palestinians have misinterpreted the law to mean prohibition on sale of property not only to Jews but also to any other non-Muslim. This misperception has been fuelled by a number of fatwas issued by Palestinian Muslim clerics in support of the PA's death penalty which fail to distinguish between Jews and Christians, but which simply condemn sale of property to "infidels" (i.e. non-Muslims).

In March 2007, the Palestinian Authority and Jordan arrested two Palestinians accused of selling a house in Hebron to Israelis. According to Hebron's Jewish Committee, "The arrest exposes once again the anti-Semitic nature of the PA. We call upon the government to accept the racial hatred prevalent in the PA." Knesset member Uri Ariel demanded that the government act to secure the release of the arrested Palestinians, while Orit Struk of the committee said the arrest proves that the house legally belongs to the Jewish community.

In 2012, Mohammad Abu Shahala, a former PA intelligence officer, was reportedly sentenced to death for selling land to Jews. The Jewish community of Hebron petitioned the UN, the US, and the Israeli government to step in on Abu Shahala's behalf.

== Events in 2009 ==
In early April 2009, it was reported that several Jewish businessmen from the United States purchased 20 dunams (2 hectares) of land from Palestinians in the Mount of Olives area of Jerusalem. The report prompted the PA to reissue its warning that sale of property to Jews constitutes "high treason" punishable by death. Sheikh Tamimi, Chief (Islamic) Judge of the PA, reminded Palestinians of an earlier fatwa against the practice. "The city of Jerusalem is the religious, political and spiritual capital of the Palestinians," he said. "The Jews have no rights in Jerusalem. This is an occupied city like the rest of the territories that were occupied in 1967." Fatah legislator Hatem Abdel Kader, an advisor to the PA Prime Minister, asserted that the ban on sale of property to Jews was still necessary as the Israeli government and settlers were mounting a "fierce onslaught" on the Arab sector in East Jerusalem, attempting to alter the demographic balance there by demolishing Palestinian homes. East Jerusalem was annexed by Israel in the wake of the 1967 war, but the annexation has not been recognized by the international community.

In late April 2009, a Palestinian military court condemned a man to death by hanging for treason after he sold some land to Israelis. The death sentence requires the approval of the Palestinian Authority president, Mahmoud Abbas, who is not expected to approve it.

== Events in 2012 ==
Osama Hussein Mansour, a retired Palestinian security officer, was arrested by the Palestinian Authority in June 2012 on charges of collaborating with Israel and being involved in land transactions with Israelis. He died in July after falling from a window while being held in Palestinian custody, but it was unclear whether he fell or was pushed. His wife does not believe it was suicide, but rather that he was killed, and stated that she visited him a few days before and he was in good spirits and happy.

== Events in 2014 ==
Palestinian Authority President Mahmoud Abbas issued an executive order that amended the land law penal code, and increased punishments for selling land to "hostile countries and its citizens". These punishments include hard labor to life imprisonment for Palestinians who sell, rent or mediate real estate transactions.

== See also ==
- Human rights in Palestine
- Israeli land and property laws
- Treason in the Islamic world
- Capital punishment in Palestine
  - Capital punishment in the West Bank
  - Capital punishment in the Gaza Strip
