= Aswat =

Palestinian organization for LGBT women

- Aswat - Palestinian Feminist Center for Gender and Sexual Freedoms
- أصوات
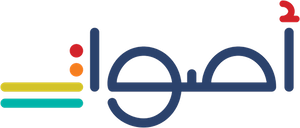
- Formation: 2000; 26 years ago
- Founder: Rauda Morcos
- Headquarters: Haifa, Israel
- Co-director: Ghadir Shafie

Aswat - Palestinian Feminist Center for Gender and Sexual Freedoms, also known as Aswat (Arabic: أصوات, lit. 'Voices'), is a feminist organization that advocates for lesbians and other LGBT women in the Palestinian community. The group started as an online platform in 2000, started having the regular meetings in 2001 and was joined Kayan-Feminist Organization in 2003 as an independent project, making it the first Palestinian organization for Queers and lesbians (LBTIQ). It was initially membership-based, but has since transitioned to a movement-based structure. It is based in Haifa, Israel.

The organization was cofounded by activist Rauda Morcos, who received the Felipa de Souza Award from OutRight Action International for her work with the group. Today, Aswat engages in advocacy work and education while also hosting monthly support group meetings that address sexual orientation, gender identity, and nationality. As of May 2016, its co-director was Ghadir Shafie.

== History ==
Morcos said that: "When we started Aswat, I remember the Islamic Movement issued a boycott against us as well as a fatwa [an Islamic religious legal order] against me personally, because according to them I was ‘the snake’s head.’" In 2004 the group had 14 members. In October 2004, Rauda Morcos spoke at the Palestine Solidarity Movement conference at Duke University in her capacity (at the time) as the coordinator of Aswat.

In 2007, when Aswat had about 30 members and held its first conference, the Islamic Movement in Israel (a grouping of Arab Muslims) publicly called for the meeting to be cancelled and urged its community "to stand against the campaign to market sexual deviance among our daughters and our women." Sheikh Ibrahim Sarsur, head of the Islamic Movement in Israel, said: "Our community does not tolerate this kind of behaviour. The consensus feels it is kind of a disease that must be healed ..."

On March 28, 2007, Aswat held its first public conference in a theater in Haifa. The event, titled "Home and Exile in Queer Experience," featured poetry readings and music. At least 250 people attended the conference; organizers estimated that about 10 to 20 of them were Arab lesbians. The Islamic Movement described the group as a "fatal cancer that should be forbidden from spreading out within the Arab society and from eliminating the Arab culture", and about 20 protesters demonstrated outside the event venue.

In 2011, Aswat and Al Qaws worked with activist Sarah Schulman to organize a delegation of sixteen LGBT people from the United States to Palestine. Following their visit to Israel and the Palestinian territories in early 2012, the delegation published a document titled "An Open Letter to LGBTQ Communities on the Israeli Occupation of Palestine."

== See also ==
- LGBT in Islam
- LGBT rights in the State of Palestine
- Pinkwashing (LGBT)
