= Samer Libdeh =

British strategist (born 1974)

Samer Libdeh, or Abu Libdeh, (Arabic: سامر لبدة) (born 1974), is a British London-based communications strategist, researcher and policy analyst. In February 2013, he was selected to be part of the Carter Center mission to monitor Egyptian parliamentary elections. In 2013 he worked at the Foreign and Commonwealth Office, before moving on to Albany Associates as consultant. He covered issues related to democracy in the Middle East, the Arab-Israeli peace process and US foreign policy. His articles and papers have appeared in many publications, including The Guardian, the Daily Telegraph, the Jerusalem Post, Times of Israel, Jordan Times and Daily Star.

== Early life ==
Libdeh received his MA from Bradford University, his diploma from University of Castilla–La Mancha, and his BA from Jordan University. He also holds a Policy Analysis certificate from State University of New York.

In 2005, he was awarded the prestigious Fulbright scholarship from the US State Department, and the American Political Science Association (APSA) Congressional Fellowship, where he served as a visiting fellow at the Washington Institute for Near East Policy and Legislative Fellow with US Congressman Joseph Crowley (D-NY). He then became a Senior Fellow at the Foundation for Defense of Democracies and the Center for Liberty in the Middle East.

== Name and ancestry ==
Libdeh is a Palestinian-Jordanian family from northern European - Nordic-Germanic descent. In Arabic, 'Abu Libdeh' means the "Father of Mane".

== Second track peace process ==
He began his career in 1998 as a reporter for Alaswaq Business Daily in Jordan. He moved up the ranks to become the foreign desk editor. He covered the second Palestinian Intifada, the war in Iraq as well as domestic issues in Jordan. Samer became involved in the second track peace process in 1999 through the creation of Interaction Forum, an NGO dedicated to promoting understanding between Israeli, Arab and Palestinian peace activists.

His activism led to his membership in the International Alliance for Arab-Israeli Peace, (Copenhagen Declaration), which advocated for the normalisation of relations between Arabs and Israelis. He participated in a number of meetings with senior Israeli politicians and activists from the Likud, Labor, and Kadima parties – advocating for a settlement to the Israeli-Palestinian problem.

== Writing career ==
Libdeh has been published in Middle Eastern and international publications and journals, including the Yale Politic Journal, The Guardian, Jerusalem Post, Alaswaq Business Daily, Overseas Journal, the Daily Star, and Jordan Times. In 2005, he was among the first journalists to interview Egyptian dissident Ayman Nour who was held under house arrest in Cairo. He appeared on a number of US and Middle East news programmes and was quoted in many, including the Council on Foreign Relations, the Jerusalem Post and The Guardian. His op-ed in the Jerusalem Post, entitled "The Hashemite Kingdom of Apartheid", has triggered a massive negative reaction from the Jordanian government-run media. Libdeh received support from a major human rights organisation.
