= Al Qaws =

Palestinian LGBTQ rights organization

alQaws
- Al Qaws for Sexual and Gender Diversity in Palestinian Society
- القوس للتعددية الجنسية والجندرية في المجتمع الفلسطيني
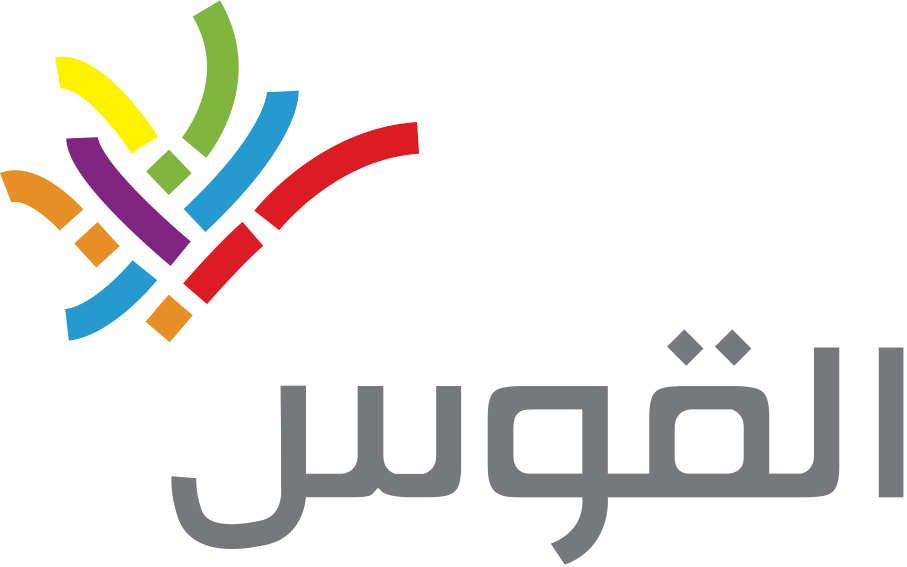
- Formation: 2007
- Headquarters: East Jerusalem
- Region served: Palestine; Israel
- Director: Haneen Maikey
- Website: alqaws.org

alQaws (Note: Arabic for "the [rain]bow" (Arabic: القوس); officially Al Qaws for Sexual and Gender Diversity in Palestinian Society (Arabic: القوس للتعددية الجنسية والجندرية في المجتمع الفلسطيني, romanized: Al-Qaws li-t-ta‘addudiyya al-jinsiyya wa-l-jandariyya fī l-mujtama‘ al-Filasṭīnī, lit. 'The [Rain]bow of Sexual and Gender Pluralism in the Palestinian Society') is a Palestinian civil society organization founded in grassroots activism, aiming to be at the forefront of Palestinian cultural and social change. The organization works to build LGBTQ+ communities and promote new ideas about the role of gender and sexual diversity in political activism, civil society institutions, media, and everyday life. The organization also describes itself as "queer-feminist" and "anti-colonial" in regards to the Israeli-occupied territories.

In August 2019, the Palestinian Authority banned Al Qaws from operating in the West Bank. The police statement was withdrawn by the end of the month, following a backlash. However, Al Qaws claims that police persecution has merely shifted to individual persecution of the organization's members.

== History ==
The organization started as an independent local project formed by the Jerusalem Open House in 2001. The group split-off and was formally established as Al Qaws in 2007 and became quickly the main NGO advocating for LGBT+ rights in the country.

Al Qaws continues to run workspaces and active programs in various locations throughout rural and urban Palestinian communities. Their activities include a national hotline with a team dedicated to supporting transgender people, local community discussion events about sexuality entitled "Hawamesh", and a training program for leaders in Palestinian institutions such as schools, youth groups, and human rights organizations.

In 2011, Al Qaws, Aswat and LGBTQ activist Sarah Schulman joined to organize a delegation of several LGBT people from the United States to Palestine. In 2012, the document "An Open Letter to LGBTQ Communities in the Israeli Occupation of Palestine" was published by the delegation.

In 2013, Al Qaws brought together 70 Palestinians, including well-known singers, music technicians, and community members, to reach out to young Palestinians through alternative music and pop culture. In 2014, Al Qaws co-signed a document with other civil organizations calling for an investigation into alleged Israeli war crimes committed during the 2014 Israel–Gaza conflict. In April 2019, Al Qaws and activist group Pinkwatching Israel called for a Palestinian boycott of the Eurovision Song Contest 2019, hosted by Israel, in opposition to "pinkwashing".

On July 26, 2019, a 16-year-old teen from the Galilee town of Tamra was stabbed by his brother near a shelter for LGBT youth because of his sexual orientation/gender identity. The event was the subject of considerable debate in Palestinian society, leading to a statement being released on July 27, 2019, by Al Qaws and signed by more than thirty Palestinian institutions condemning violence towards people with different sexual and gender orientations. Public debate also led to a demonstration led by alQaws on August 1, 2019, in partnership with several queer and feminist Palestinian organizations with more than 200 people gathering in Al-Aseer Square in Haifa.

On August 17, 2019, the Palestinian Authority spokesperson released a statement claiming to ban Al Qaws' activities in the West Bank. The statement came following the increased visibility of Al Qaws' work on social media after widespread media coverage of the Haifa demonstration. This increased attention to the organization's social media pages led to some anger over Al Qaws' announcement of a discussion event that was held in Nablus and the announcement of an upcoming queer youth camp. On August 27, 2019, the Palestinian Authority rescinded the ban following backlash and condemnation from human rights groups. According to Al Qaws, the police have not officially rescinded their statement, merely quietly depublished it, and the police has continued to restrict Al Qaws' activities and to harass its members.

== Location ==
Four centers are linked to the association. They are located in Haifa, East Jerusalem, Jaffa and Ramallah.
