= Robert L. Bernstein =

American activist and publisher (1923–2019)

- Born: January 5, 1923; New York City, U.S.
- Died: May 27, 2019 (aged 96); Manhattan, New York, U.S.
- Education: Harvard University
- Occupations: Book publisher and human rights activist

Robert Louis Bernstein (January 5, 1923 – May 27, 2019) was an American publisher and human rights activist.

== Career in publishing ==
Bernstein started as an office boy at Simon & Schuster in 1946, moved to Random House in 1956 and succeeded Bennett Cerf as President and CEO in 1966. He served as the President of Random House for 25 years. He published many great American authors, including William Faulkner, James Michener, Dr. Seuss, Toni Morrison and William Styron.

After being invited to the Soviet Union as part of a delegation from the Association of American Publishers, he became interested in writers whose work could not be published in their own countries. Beginning with Andrei Sakharov and Elena Bonner, he ensured that authors like Václav Havel, Jacobo Timerman, Xu Wenli and Wei Jingsheng were all published around the world.

== Involvement in human rights movement ==
After his experience in Moscow in 1973, Bernstein returned to the U.S. and established the Fund for Free Expression, the parent organization of Helsinki Watch which was established to monitor the former Soviet Union's compliance with the Helsinki Accords.

In 1988, the series of "Watch Committees" created throughout the 1980s—Americas Watch, Asia Watch, Middle East Watch—merged to become Human Rights Watch, one of the largest human rights organizations in the world. Bernstein served as the Chair of Human Rights Watch from 1978 to 1998, when he became Founding Chair Emeritus. However, he later became a critic of the group, publicly chastising them in a 2009 essay that appeared on the op-ed page of The New York Times. His concern was deviation from the group's charter, which was to focus on abuses in closed societies lacking the free speech that creates internal pressure to improve human rights. Bernstein felt that the organization's credibility was diminished by an undue focus of reporting on Israel's military that lacked credible sources in Gaza, and ignored Israel's open society. The criticism opened a rift between Bernstein and Human Rights Watch, which was not healed until shortly before his death, when he was lauded at the organization's annual dinner.

Bernstein was also a board member and chair emeritus of Human Rights in China.

== International recognition ==
Bernstein won numerous awards and honorary degrees, including the Florina Lasker Award from the New York Civil Liberties Union; the Human Rights Award from the Lawyers Committee for Human Rights; the Spirit of Liberty Award from People for the American Way; the Barnard Medal of Distinction from Barnard College; the Curtis Benjamin Award for Distinguished Publishing from the Association of American Publishers; and, in 1998, the United States' first Eleanor Roosevelt Award for Human Rights, which was presented by President Bill Clinton.

In 2014, Bernstein was honored with a Social Justice Award from The New Press, the non-profit, public interest publishing house set-up by his long-time Random House colleague André Schiffrin.

At Yale in 1998, Bernstein was honored by friends and colleagues with the establishment of the Robert L. Bernstein Fellowships in International Human Rights at Yale Law School. The fellowships are awarded annually to two or three Law School graduates devoted to advancing human rights protection around the world. Bernstein was also honored by New York University School of Law, which established the Robert L. Bernstein Fellowship in International Human Rights in 2006. In 2015, NYU School of Law created the Robert L. Bernstein Institute for Human Rights, a research center that will promote scholarship, education, and advocacy on human rights issues in the United States and abroad.

He was the recipient of honorary doctorates from Swarthmore College, The New School, Bard College, Hofstra University, Bates College, Tougaloo College, and Yale University.

== Military service ==
Bernstein served in the U.S. Army Air Force from 1943 to 1946, two of the years overseas in India, where he was a staff sergeant.

== Education ==
He graduated from Harvard University in 1944, with a Bachelor of Science degree.

== Books ==
Robert L. Bernstein was the author of Speaking Freely: My Life in Publishing and Human Rights, published by The New Press in May 2016.
