= List of massacres in Israel =

This is a list of massacres that have occurred in Israel after the 1948 Palestine War.

- For massacres that have occurred in Roman Judea prior to the establishment of the Roman province of Syria Palæstina, see List of massacres in Roman Judea.
- For massacres that took place prior to the British Mandate, see List of massacres in Ottoman Syria.
- For massacres that took place in Mandatory Palestine, see List of killings and massacres in Mandatory Palestine.
- For massacres that took place during the 1948 Palestine War, see Killings and massacres during the 1948 Palestine War.
- For massacres that have occurred in the West Bank and Gaza since 1948, see List of massacres in Palestine.

| Name | Date | Location | Responsible Party | Deaths | Notes |
|---|---|---|---|---|---|
| Yehud attack | 12 October 1953 | Yehud, Israel | Palestinian fedayeen | 3 (Israeli) | A cross-border infiltration unit threw a grenade into a civilian home, killing a woman and two children. |
| Ma'ale Akrabim massacre | 16–17 March 1954 | Scorpions Pass | Unknown; Arab Bedouins suspected | 11 | 2 injured |
| Shafrir synagogue shooting | 11 April 1956 | Kfar Chabad (Shafrir), Israel | Palestinian fedayeen | 6 (Israeli) | Palestinian militants infiltrated from Egypt and opened fire inside a synagogue study hall filled with children and teenagers, killing five children and a youth instructor. |
| Beersheba - Eilat Road shooting attack | 23 April 1956 | Beersheba–Eilat road, Israel | Palestinian fedayeen | 4 (Israeli) | Infiltrators from Jordan ambushed a civilian vehicle traveling along the Beersheba–Eilat road, killing four Israeli employees of the national water authority. |
| The Line 361 Bus Attack 1956 | 16 August 1956 | Near Be'er Menucha, Arava, Israel | Palestinian fedayeen | 4 (Israeli) | A group of infiltrators from Jordan ambushed an Egged bus and its IDF escort vehicle on the road to Eilat. Four people were killed and nine others wounded in the shooting and subsequent close-range assault. |
| Ein Ofarim killings | 12 September 1956 | Ein Ofarim, near Hatzeva, Israel | Palestinian fedayeen | 3 (Israeli Druze) | Palestinian fedayeen infiltrated from Jordan attacked the Ein Ofarim oil-drilling camp near Hatzeva, killing three Druze watchmen. The victims were stabbed and their weapons stolen by the attackers. |
| Ramat Rachel shooting attack | 23 September 1956 | Near Kibbutz Ramat Rachel, Israel | Jordanian Arab Legion | 4 (Israeli) | Jordanian Legion soldiers opened machine-gun fire from positions across the border on a group of Israeli archaeologists working at an excavation site near Ramat Rachel, killing four and wounding sixteen others. |
| Negev desert road ambush | 4 October 1956 | Highway 25, Negev Desert, Israel | Palestinian fedayeen | 5 (Israeli) | A squad of Palestinian fedayeen infiltrated from Jordan and ambushed two civilian vehicles traveling on the Sodom–Beersheba road, killing five Israeli civilians and wounding another. |
| Kafr Qasim massacre | 29 October 1956 | Kafr Qasim | Israel Border Police | 47 | 23 children were among the victims. Israeli President Shimon Peres issued a formal apology in December 2007. |
| 1956 Sderot Mining Attack | 5 November 1956 | Sderot, southern Israel | Palestinian fedayeen | 5 (Israeli) | Palestinian fedayeen infiltrators planted a landmine near Sderot, which detonated when a horse-drawn cart carrying five young laborers struck it while traveling to work at agricultural fields near Ibim. All five occupants were killed in the explosion during the final stages of the Sinai War. |
| September 1961 Gaza border incident | 17–18 September 1961 | near the Gaza–Israel border | Israel Border Police | 5 | All five of the victims are Israeli Arabs. |
| Avivim school bus bombing | 8 May 1970 | near Avivim | Popular Front for the Liberation of Palestine – General Command | 12 | 25 wounded; 9 victims were children |
| Lod Airport massacre | 30 May 1972 | Lod | Three members of the Japanese Red Army, on behalf of the Popular Front for the Liberation of Palestine | 26 | 80 injured |
| Kiryat Shmona massacre | 11 April 1974 | Kiryat Shmona, Israel | Popular Front for the Liberation of Palestine – General Command | 18 | 8 victims were children; 15 injured |
| Ma'alot massacre | 15 May 1974 | Ma'alot | Democratic Front for the Liberation of Palestine | 29 | 68 injured; victims were mostly children |
| Zion Square massacre | 4 July 1975 | Jerusalem | Palestine Liberation Organization | 15 | 77 wounded |
| Coastal Road massacre | 11 March 1978 | near Tel Aviv | Palestine Liberation Organization | 38 | 38 people were killed on bus. Victims include 13 children. Other people killed nearby. 71 wounded. |
| Rishon LeZion Massacre | 20 May 1990 | Rishon LeZion | Ami Popper, an Israeli citizen | 7 | Seven Palestinian workers were killed, 16 Palestinians were wounded. The perpetrator was a 21-year-old Israeli with an automatic weapon. 13 more Palestinians were killed by Israeli forces in subsequent demonstrations to protest the massacre in various parts of the territories. |
| Dizengoff Street bus bombing | 19 October 1994 | Tel Aviv, Israel | Hamas | 22 | Suicide bomber blows himself up in a bus during the morning rush hour at Dizengoff street, Tel Aviv. Killing 22 people and injuring 50 others. Hamas claimed responsibility. |
| Beit Lid suicide bombing | 22 January 1995 | Beit Lid Junction | Palestinian Islamic Jihad | 23 | Death toll includes 2 perpetrators; 69 injured; first suicide attack by Palestinian Islamic Jihad. |
| Sbarro restaurant suicide bombing | 9 August 2001 | Jerusalem | Hamas | 15 | 130 injured; 7 victims were children |
| Dolphinarium discotheque bombing | 1 June 2001 | Tel Aviv | Hamas | 21 | 100+ wounded |
| 2002 Hadera attack | 18 January 2002 | Hadera | al-Aqsa Martyrs' Brigades | 7 | 33 wounded |
| Yeshivat Beit Yisrael bombing | 2 March 2002 | Beit Yisrael, Jerusalem | Fatah al-Aqsa Martyrs' Brigades | 11 | Victims included 7 children, 2 of which were infants |
| Café Moment bombing | 9 March 2002 | Jerusalem | Izz ad-Din al-Qassam Brigades | 11 | 54 wounded |
| Passover massacre | 27 March 2002 | Netanya | Hamas | 30 | 140 injured; some victims were Holocaust survivors; considered the deadliest single attack against Israeli civilians during the Second Intifada |
| Kiryat Menachem bus bombing | 21 November 2002 | Jerusalem | Hamas | 11 | 50+ wounded |
| Tel Aviv central bus station massacre | 5 January 2003 | Southern Tel Aviv | Fatah al-Aqsa Martyrs' Brigades | 23 | Over 100 injured |
| Shmuel HaNavi bus bombing | 19 August 2003 | Jerusalem | Hamas | 24 | 130+ wounded |
| Maxim restaurant suicide bombing | 4 October 2003 | beachfront "Maxim" restaurant, Haifa | Palestinian Islamic Jihad female suicide bomber | 21 civilians | 60 civilians were injured. |
| Shfaram massacre | 4 August 2005 | bus in Shefa-Amr | Israeli army deserter | 5 Arab civilians | 12 Arab civilians were injured. |
| 2nd Rosh Ha'ir restaurant bombing | 17 April 2006 | Tel Aviv | Palestinian Islamic Jihad | 11 civilians (+1 bomber) | |
| 2008 Jerusalem yeshiva attack | 6 March 2008 | Kiryat Moshe, Jerusalem | Arab gunman, Alaa Abu Dhein | 8 | Attack took place at a school, and seven victims were students. |
| 2008 Jerusalem bulldozer attack | 2 July 2008 | Jaffa Road, Jerusalem | Hussam Taysir Duwait | 3 | Attack on motorists. Three people were killed and thirty injured. |
| 2014 Jerusalem synagogue attack | 18 November 2014 | Har Nof, Jerusalem | Uday Abu Jamal and Ghassan Abu Jamal | 5 | Attack against a synagogue. Four rabbis and a police officer were killed. |
| June 2016 Tel Aviv shooting | 8 June 2016 | Sarona market, Tel Aviv | Khalid al-Mahmara and Muhammad Mahmara | 4 | Attack on restaurant guests in downtown Tel Aviv. Four civilians killed. |
| 2022 Beersheba attack | 22 March 2022 | Beersheba | Mohammed Abu al-Kiyan | 4 | Stabbing and vehicle ramming attack. |
| 2022 Bnei Brak shootings | 29 March 2022 | Bnei Brak | Diaa Hamarsheh | 5 | Attack on pedestrians. Four civilians and a police officer killed. |
| Nova music festival massacre | 7 October 2023 | Re'im | Hamas | 325+ | Deadliest massacre in Israeli history. At least 37 Israeli and foreign civilians kidnapped and taken into the Gaza Strip. Part of the Gaza war. |
| Be'eri massacre | 7 October 2023 | Be'eri | Hamas | 108+ | Part of the Gaza war. |
| Kfar Aza massacre | 7 October 2023 | Kfar Aza | Hamas | 52 | Part of the Gaza war. |
| Nir Oz attack | 7 October 2023 | Nir Oz | Hamas | 25 | Part of the Gaza war. |
| Netiv HaAsara massacre | 7 October 2023 | Netiv HaAsara | Hamas | 20+ | Part of the Gaza war. |
| Holit attack | 7 October 2023 | Holit | Hamas | 13+ | Part of the Gaza war. |
| Ein HaShlosha massacre | 7 October 2023 | Ein HaShlosha | Hamas | 5+ | Part of the Gaza war. |
| Nahal Oz attack | 7 October 2023 | Nahal Oz | Hamas | 100+ | Part of the Gaza war. |
| Psyduck music festival Massacre | 7 October 2023 | Eshkol Regional Council | Hamas | 17 | Part of the Gaza war. |
| Kissufim massacre | 7 October 2023 | Kissufim | Hamas | 4+ | Part of the Gaza war. |
| Nirim attack | 7 October 2023 | Nirim | Hamas | 5 | Part of the Gaza war. |
| Yakhini massacre | 7 October 2023 | Yakhini | Hamas | 7 | Part of the Gaza war. |
| Alumim massacre | 7 October 2023 | Alumim | Hamas | 16/17 | Victims were foreign workers from Thailand and Nepal. Part of the Gaza war. |
| 2024 Jaffa shooting | 1 October 2024 | Jaffa | Hamas | 7 | Part of the Gaza war. |

== See also ==
- List of killings and massacres in Mandatory Palestine
- List of attacks against Israeli civilians before 1967
- List of massacres in Jerusalem
- Civilian casualties in the Second Intifada
- List of Palestinian suicide attacks
- Palestinian political violence
- List of massacres during the 2023 Israel–Hamas war
