= List of attacks against Israeli civilians before 1967 =

This article deals with acts of Palestinian political violence against Israeli civilians between the establishment of the 1949 Armistice Agreements and the 1967 Six-Day War.

Prior to Israel's occupation of the West Bank and Gaza Strip in the Six-Day War, these areas, originally destined for a Palestinian state, were under Jordanian, and Egyptian occupation. Palestinians crossed the border for a variety of reasons. This resulted in confrontation with Israeli military and border guards, from 1949 to 1956 about 500 Israelis died, half of them combatants, and between 2,700 and 5,000 Palestinians. Simultaneously, a variety of Israeli military attacks targeted Palestinian fedayeen, Egyptian and Jordanian military forces in the Gaza Strip, West Bank and Jordan, in response to the Arab offensive.

A number of fedayeen attacks deliberately targeted civilians, causing many deaths and serious injuries and disrupting daily life. Israel's Ministry of Foreign Affairs describes the following events as terrorist attacks, although most media reports of that time refer to them as 'fedayeen' attacks.

== Border conflict, 1951-1956 ==
- February 1951 - Jamil Muhammad Mujarrab, a member of a Jordanian armed group, raped and murdered an Israeli girl in Jerusalem's Katamon neighborhood.
- Jan 1, 1952 - Seven gunmen attacked and killed a nineteen-year-old girl in her home, in the neighborhood of Beit Yisrael, in Jerusalem. On investigation, the Mixed Armistice Commission found that the case against Jordanian infiltrators could not be substantiated.
- December 31, 1951/ Jan 1 1952 - a rape-murder occurred. The MAC investigating officer, Major Loreaux, reported that the body of the girl, Leah Feistinger, had been found hidden in a cave about a mile from the Jordan border, the girl had been raped, murdered, and her face had been mutilated. While it was believed by Israeli police that this atrocity had been committed by Jordanians, they did not find evidence of an infiltration. The case had not been discussed by the commission. Major Loreaux expressed the opinion that the Israeli police would have a better chance of finding the killer than the Arabs would. A “reprisal raid” carried out at Beit Jalla on January 6, 1952, was attributed to Israelis.
- Apr 14, 1953 - Infiltrators tried for the first time to infiltrate Israel by sea, but were unsuccessful. One of the boats was intercepted and the other boat escaped.
- June 7, 1953 - A youngster was killed and three others were wounded, in a shooting attacks on residential areas in southern Jerusalem.
- June 9, 1953 - Gunmen attacked a farming community near Lod, and killed one of the residents. The gunmen threw hand grenades and sprayed gunfire in all directions. On the same night, another group of terrorists attacked a house in the town of Hadera. This occurred a day after Israel and Jordan signed an agreement, with UN mediation, in which Jordan undertook to prevent terrorists from crossing into Israel from Jordanian territory.
- June 10, 1953 - Attackers infiltrating from Jordan destroyed a house in the farming village of Mishmar Ayalon.
- June 11, 1953 - Gunmen attacked a young couple in their home in Kfar Hess, and shot them to death.
- Sept 2, 1953 - Attackers infiltrated from Jordan, and reached the neighborhood of Katamon, in the heart of Jerusalem. They threw hand grenades in all directions. No one was hurt.
- October 12, 1953 - Yehud attack - A Palestinian Fedayeen squad threw a grenade into a civilian house in Yehud, killing a woman and her two children.

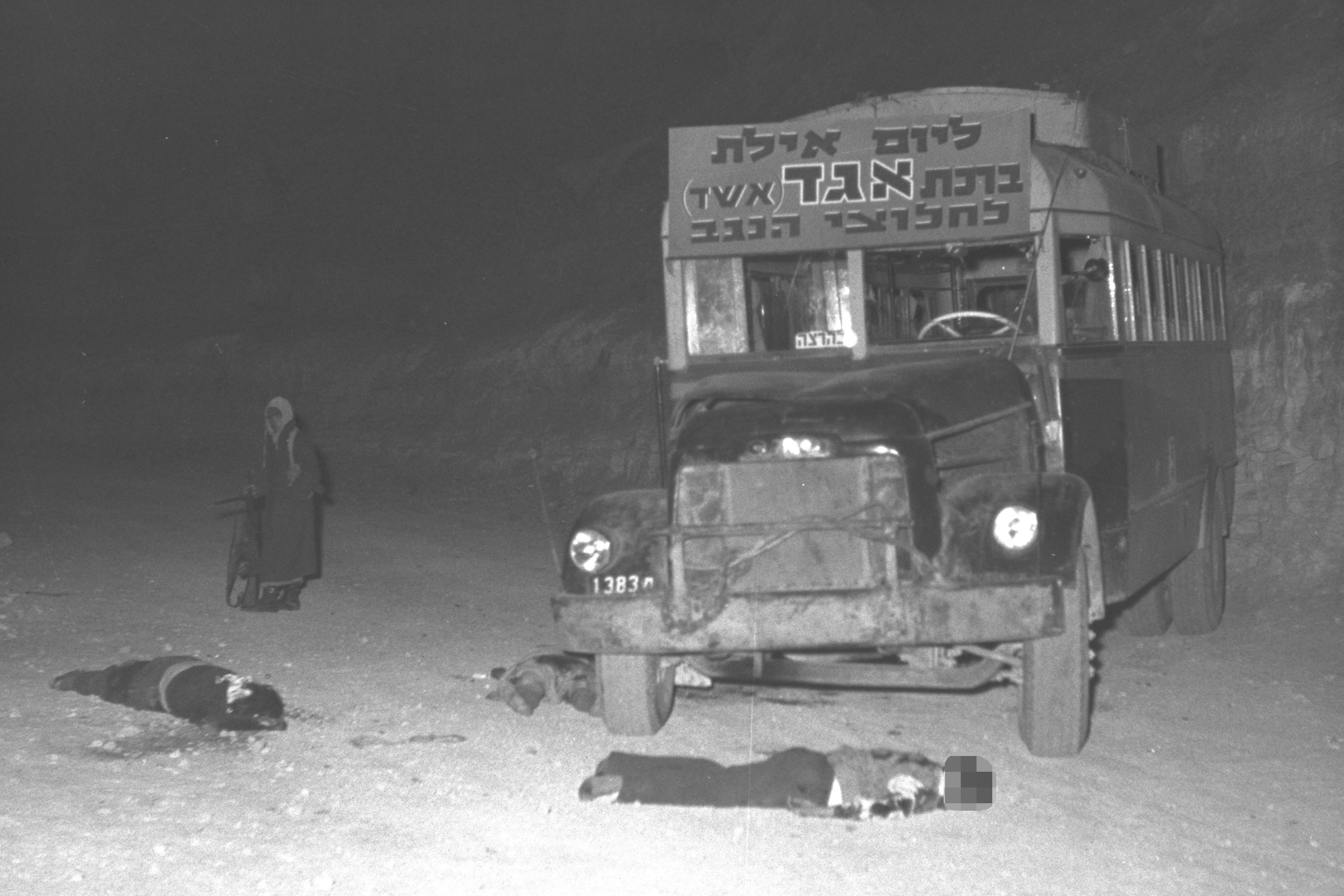
Scorpions Pass Massacre

- Mar 17, 1954 - Scorpion Pass Massacre - Bandits ambushed a bus traveling from Eilat to Tel Aviv, and opened fire at short range when the bus reached the area of Ma'ale Akrabim (Scorpion Pass) in the northern Negev. In the initial ambush, the bandits killed the driver and wounded most of the passengers. The bandits then boarded the bus, and shot some of the passengers, one by one. Eleven passengers were murdered. Survivors recounted how the murderers spat on the bodies and abused them. The massacre was apparently a reprisal raid conducted by members of a Bedouin tribe expelled from the al-Auja region of the Sinai three and a half years earlier.
- Jan 2, 1955 - Gunmen attacked and killed 2 hikers in the Judean Desert.
- Mar 24, 1955 - Gunmen threw hand grenades and opened fire on a crowd at a wedding in the farming community of Patish, in the Negev. A young woman was killed, and eighteen people were wounded in the attack.
- August 29, 1955 - Beit Oved attack - a Palestinian Fedayeen squad fired small arms at a group of Israeli laborers, killing four and injuring ten.
- Apr 7, 1956 - A resident of Ashkelon was killed in her home, when attackers threw three hand grenades into her house. Two members of kibbutz Givat Haim were killed, when terrorists opened fire on their car, on the road from Plugot Junction to Mishmar HaNegev. There were further hand grenade and shooting attacks on homes and cars, in areas such as Nitzanim and Ketziot. One person was killed and three others wounded.
- Apr 11, 1956 - Gunmen opened fire on a synagogue full of children and teenagers, in the farming community of Shafir. Three children and a youth worker were killed on the spot, and five were wounded, including three seriously.
- Apr 29, 1956 - Killing of Roi Rotberg and Moshe Dayan's eulogy killed by Egyptian-backed Fedayeen, 21 years of age, from Nahal Oz.
- August 16, 1956 - Egged bus 391 ambush - a Palestinian Fedayeen squad carries out an attack on an Israeli civilian passenger bus traveling from Tel-Aviv to Eilat. Three Israeli soldiers and a female civilian passenger were shot dead by the attackers who ambushed the bus. In addition, three other civilian passengers were injured in the attack.
- Sept 12, 1956 - Ein Ofarim killings - Attackers killed three Druze guards at the Ein Ofarim facility, in the Arabah region.
- Sept 23, 1956 - Ramat Rachel shooting attack - Gunmen opened fire from a Jordanian position, killing four archaeologists and wounded sixteen others near kibbutz Ramat Rachel.
- Sept 24, 1956 - Attackers killed a girl in the fields of the farming community of Aminadav, near Jerusalem.
- Oct 4, 1956 - Negev desert road ambush - A squad of 10 armed Palestinian Arab militants, who infiltrated into Israel from Jordan, ambush and kill five Israeli construction workers in Sdom.
- Oct 9, 1956 - Two workers were killed in an orchard of the youth village, Neve Hadassah, in the Sharon region.

== Suez Crisis, October 1956-March 1957 ==
- Nov 5, 1956 - Sderot mining attack - The incident resulted in the deaths of five young men after their horse-drawn cart struck a landmine planted by Fedayeen near Sderot.
- Nov 8, 1956 - Gunmen opened fire on a train, attacked cars and blew up wells, in the North and Center of Israel. Six Israelis were wounded.
- Feb 18, 1957 - Two civilians were killed by landmines, next to Nir Yitzhak, on the southern border of the Gaza Strip.
- Mar 8, 1957 - A shepherd from kibbutz Beit Guvrin was killed by terrorists in a field near the kibbutz.

== Border conflict, 1957-1967 ==
- Apr 16, 1957 - Militants infiltrated from Jordan, and killed two guards at Kibbutz Mesilot.
- May 20, 1957 - A gunman opened fire on a truck in the Arava region, killing a worker.
- May 29, 1957 - A tractor driver was killed and two others wounded, when the vehicle struck a landmine, next to kibbutz Kissufim.
- June 23, 1957 - Israelis were wounded by landmines, close to the Gaza Strip.
- Aug 23, 1957 - Two guards of the Israeli Mekorot water company were killed near Kibbutz Beit Govrin.
- Dec 21, 1957 - A member of kibbutz Gadot was killed in the Kibbutz fields.
- Feb 11, 1958 - Militants killed a resident of moshav Yanov who was on his way to Kfar Yona, in the Sharon area.
- Apr 5, 1958 - Militants lying in an ambush shot and killed two people near Tel Lakhish.
- Apr 22, 1958 - Jordanian soldiers shot and killed two fishermen near Aqaba.
- May 26, 1958 - Four Israeli police officers were killed in a Jordanian attack on Mount Scopus, in Jerusalem. At 1654 Local time Lieutenant-Colonel Flint of the Mixed Armistice Commission was killed apparently by a single sniper round while trying to evacuate the dead and wounded Israelis from an Israeli police patrol. The Israeli police patrol was on a disputed route past the al-Issawiya village in the Jordanian controlled area of Mount Scopus.
- Nov 17, 1958 - Syrian militants killed the wife of the British air attaché in Israel, who was staying at the guesthouse of the Italian Convent on the Mt. of the Beatitudes.
- Dec 3, 1958- A shepherd was killed at Kibbutz Gonen. In the artillery attack that followed, 31 civilians were wounded.
- Jan 23, 1959 - A shepherd from Kibbutz Lehavot HaBashan was killed.
- Feb 1, 1959 - Three civilians were killed by a landmine near Moshav Zavdiel.
- Apr 15, 1959 - A guard was killed at kibbutz Ramat Rachel.
- Apr 27, 1959 - Two hikers were shot at close range and killed near Masada.
- Oct 3, 1959 - A shepherd from kibbutz Heftziba was killed near kibbutz Yad Hana.
- Apr 26, 1960 - Militants killed a resident of Ashkelon south of the city.
- Apr 12, 1962 - Militants fired on an Egged bus on the way to Eilat; one passenger was wounded.
- Sept 30, 1962 - Two Militants attacked an Egged bus on the way to Eilat. No one was wounded.
- May 31, 1965 - Jordanian Legionnaires fired on the neighborhood of Musrara in Jerusalem, killing two civilians and wounding four.
- June 1, 1965 - Militants attack a house in Kibbutz Yiftah.
- Sept 29, 1965 - A Militant was killed as he attempted to attack Moshav Amatzia.
- Nov 7, 1965 - A Fatah cell that infiltrated from Jordan blew up a house in Moshav Givat Yeshayahu, south of Beit Shemesh. The house was destroyed, but the inhabitants were unhurt.
- Apr 25, 1966 - Explosions placed by Militants wounded two civilians and damaged three houses in moshav Beit Yosef, in the Beit She'an Valley.
- May 16, 1966 - Two Israelis were killed when their jeep hit an enemy landmine, north of the Sea of Galilee and south of Almagor. Tracks led into Syria.
- July 14, 1966 - Militants attacked a house in Kfar Yuval, in the North.
- July 19, 1966 - Militants infiltrated into Moshav Margaliot on the northern border and planted nine explosive charges.
- Oct 27, 1966 - A civilian was wounded by an explosive charge on the railroad tracks to Jerusalem.
