= Killing of Asel Asleh =

2000 killing of a Palestinian boy

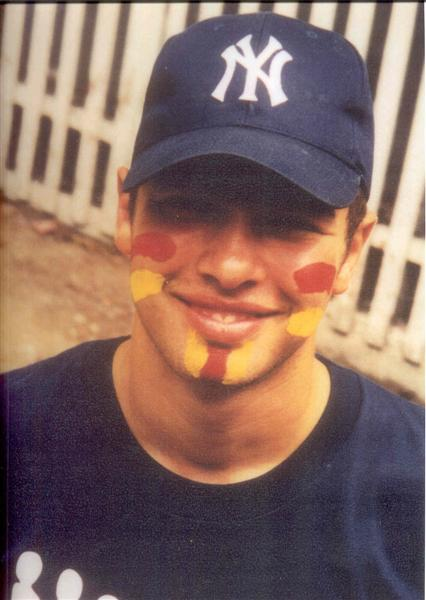
Picture of Asleh at Seeds of Peace

Asel Asleh (Arabic: أسيل عاصلة, Hebrew: אסיל עאסלה; May 6, 1983 – October 2, 2000) was a Palestinian boy killed on 2 October 2000 by Israeli police forces. The killing occurred when Palestinian citizens of Israel in Asleh's village of Arrabe protested the killings of Palestinians in the West Bank and Gaza by the Israeli military.

== Background ==
Asel Asleh was from the village of Arraba in the Lower Galilee. He had been a member of the international conflict resolution organization Seeds of Peace since 1997. Prior to his death, Asleh described himself as "an ex-Palestinian, currently an Arab Israeli." He had many Jewish friends and was killed while wearing the Seeds of Peace T-shirt.

== Killing ==
Asleh attended a protest in his village on 2 October. Trying to disperse the protest, an Israeli Security Forces unit shot tear-gas and live ammunition at the protesters. The precise actions which led to the death of Asleh were unclear; the police officers stated that they did not know how he was killed, while his cousin said that he had seen a gun pointed at Asleh and then he heard three shots. A physician who treated the youth commented that Asleh was shot in the neck at point-blank range, and that crucial time had been lost when the police delayed the arrival of an ambulance. Officers alleged that he was already shot when they found him lying in the olive grove. Eventually, Asleh died at Nahariya Hospital. The examination by the Or Commission reached a very advanced stage but ended when the Asleh family refused to allow the exhumation of Asel's body to extract the bullets which killed Asleh for tests.

== Or Commission, the October 2000 events and further investigations ==
Asleh was one of 13 Arab citizens of Israel killed. In October 2000, his father successfully led a campaign to investigate killing of his son and others. Subsequently, the October 2000 events were investigated by the Israeli-government appointed Or Commission. The Or Commission heavily condemned Israeli police for using excessive force to disperse the protesters. Asleh's father, Hassan, is head of the Committee of the Victims' Families, which has sought to keep pressure on the official responsible for the death of Asleh and the other twelve killed in October 2000. In October 2006, Israeli newspaper Haaretz reported that the main suspect in Asleh's killing refused a lie detector test six times. On October 24, 2000, three weeks after Asleh's death, United Kingdom MP Richard Burden opened a debate on the Israeli–Palestinian conflict by noting Asleh's recent death and the lack of autopsy and investigation to that point.

== Further protests ==
In February 2008, members of Seeds of Peace led a protest in front of Israel's Ministry of Justice demanding that it reopen the investigation into the October 2000 events, specifically the killing of Asleh. The protesters also sent letters to Attorney General Menahem Mazuz and Prime Minister Ehud Olmert asking if the case would have been reopened if the victims had been Jews.

On September 30, 2010, 6,000 Arab citizens of Israel and supporters led a procession marking the 10 year anniversary of the 13 Arabs killed in October 2000. The protesters called on officials to try the police officers involved in the killings. Member of Knesset Ahmad Tibi said "These past 10 years have been filled with anger and pain for the victims' families, and for the general Arab public. They represent a black mark on the history of the State of Israel," On 1 October, the Arab Higher Monitoring Committee declared a one-day strike to commemorate the youth.
