= Aluma, Israel =

Moshav in southern Israel

Aluma: אלומה (Hebrew)

Hebrew transcription(s)
  - Official: Alumma
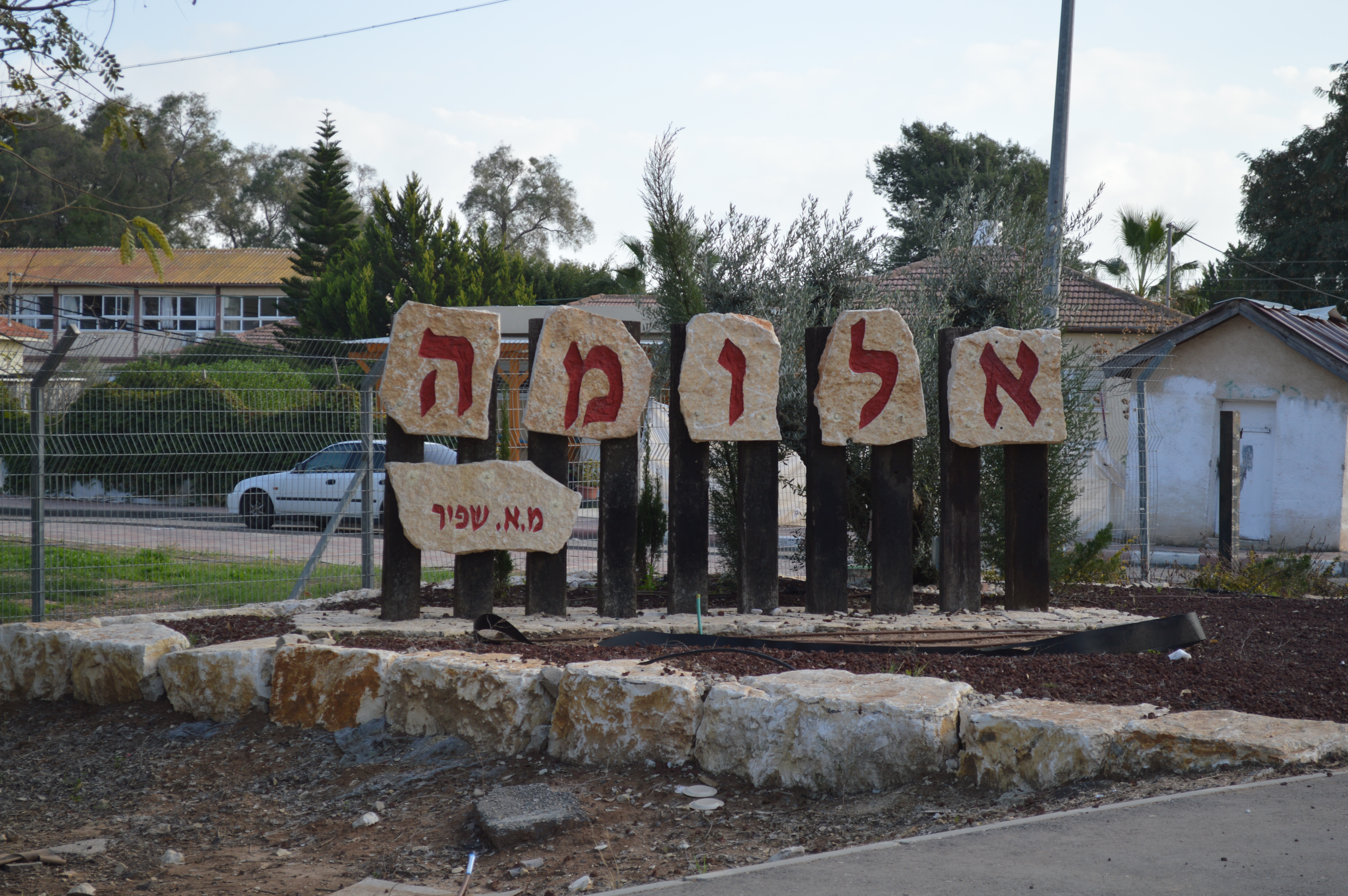
- Etymology: Sheaf
- Location within Ashkelon region of Israel Location within Israel
- Coordinates: 31°39′5″N 34°44′37″E
- Country: Israel
- District: Southern
- Subdistrict: Ashkelon
- Council: Shafir
- Founded: 1965
- Founder: Agudat Yisrael members
- Population (2024): 1,706

Aluma (Hebrew: אלומה, lit. 'Sheaf') is a moshav in southern Israel. Located in the southern coastal plain around three kilometers north-west of Kiryat Gat, it falls under the jurisdiction of Shafir Regional Council. In 2024 it had a population of 1,706.

== History ==
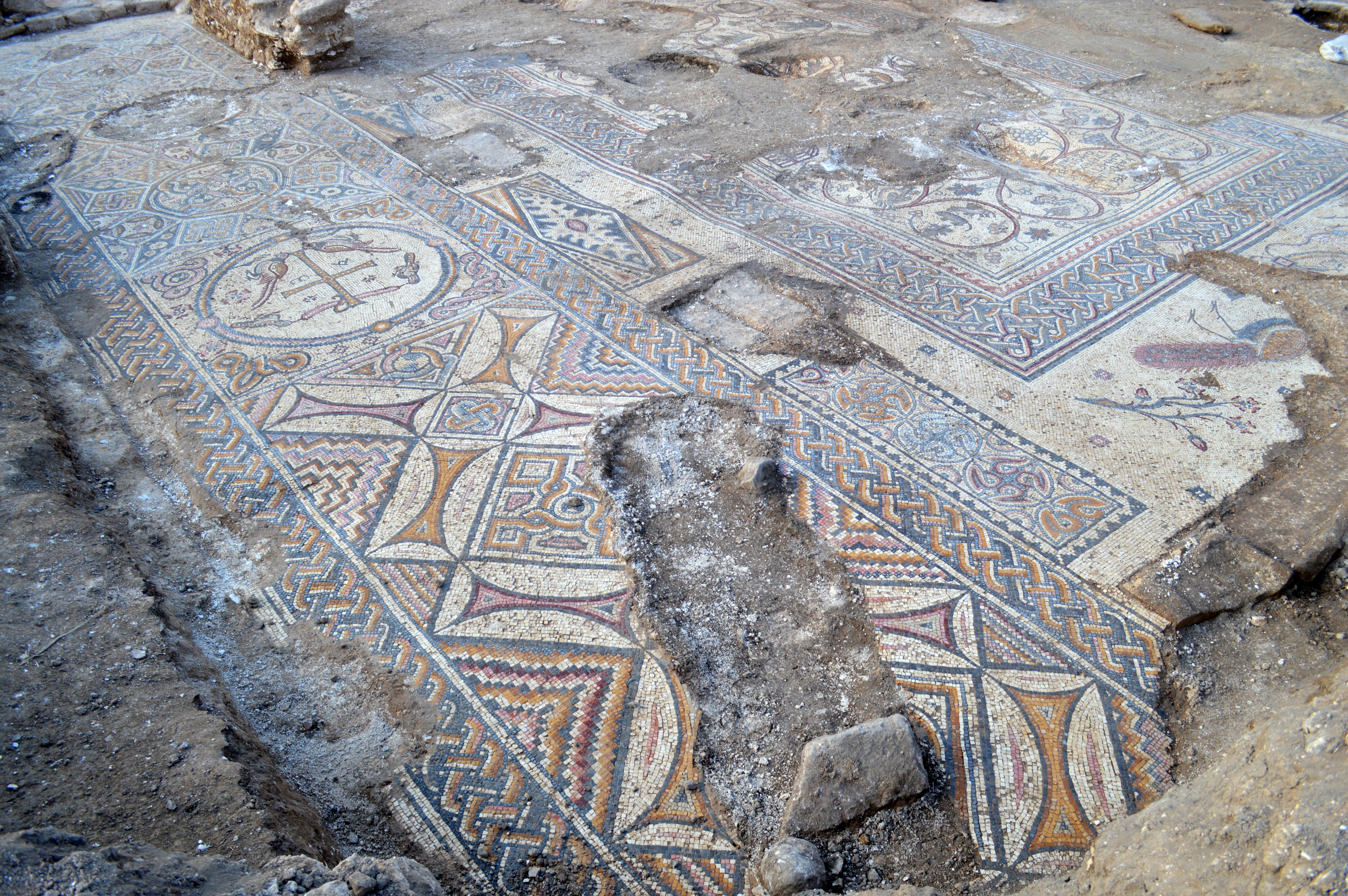
Byzantine mosaic floor in Aluma

The village was established in 1965 as a youth village named Hazon Yehezkel by a group called Mosadot Hinukh Ezuri (lit. Institute for Regional Education), made up of young members of Agudat Yisrael. It was built on the lands of the depopulated Palestinian village of Hatta. In 1996 the Ministry of Interior granted the village municipal council status and renamed it Aluma. In 2014, the Israel Antiquities Authority uncovered a 1,500-year-old Byzantine church containing an ancient mosaic floor bearing a Christogram surrounded by birds. The church was discovered during a salvage dig prior to the construction of a new neighborhood on the moshav.
