= Middle East Entrepreneurs of Tomorrow =

Program for Palestinian and Israeli young leaders

Middle East Entrepreneurs of Tomorrow (MEET)
- MEET logo

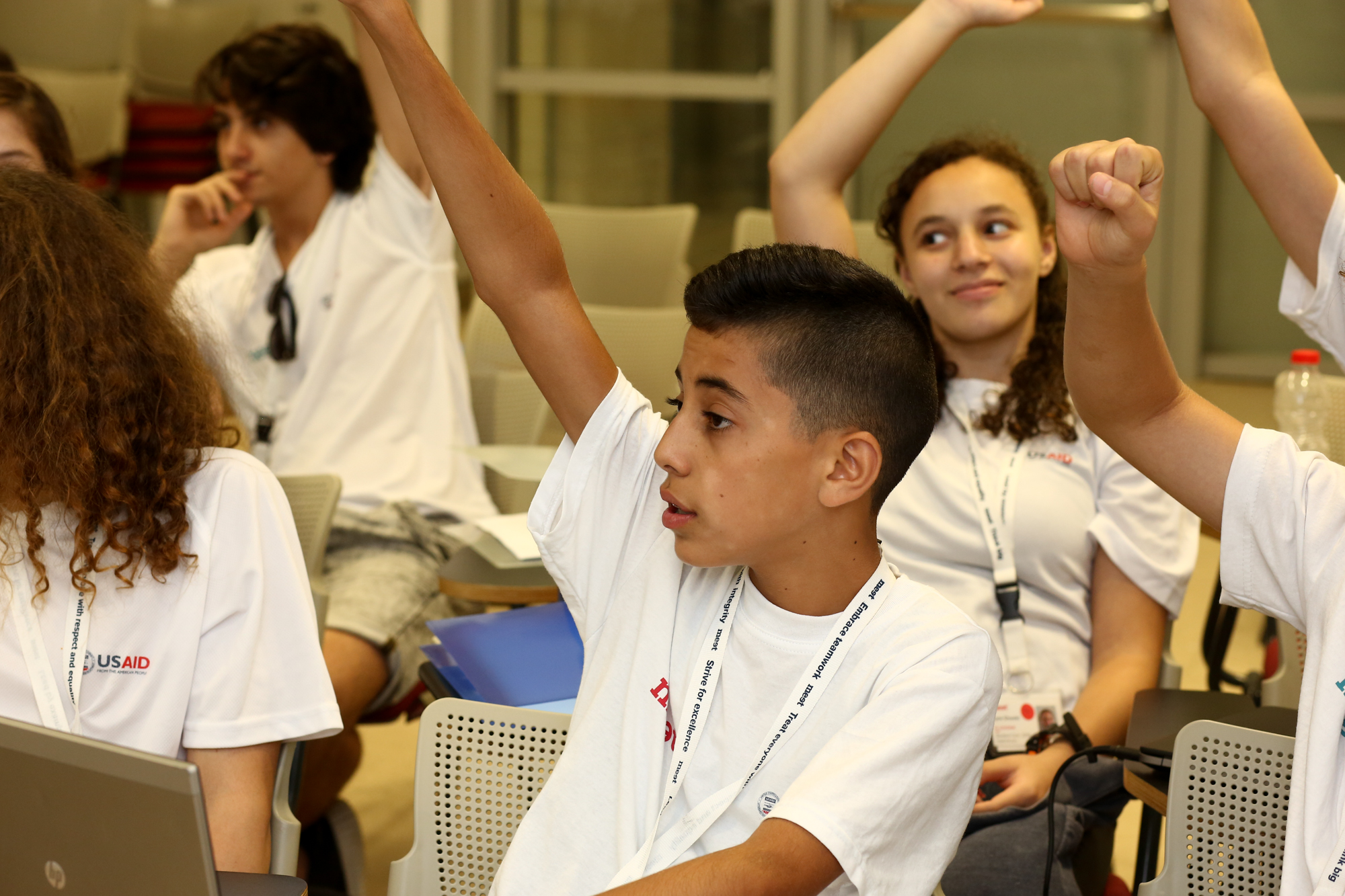
- Year 1 Summer Program 2016 MEET students
- Formation: 2004; 22 years ago
- Founder: Anat Binur, Yaron Binur, Assaf Harlap, Abeer Hazboun, Sandra Ashhab
- Founded at: Israel
- Location: Jerusalem, Nazareth
- Affiliations: Massachusetts Institute of Technology (MIT)

Middle East Entrepreneurs of Tomorrow (MEET), formerly known as Middle East Education Through Technology, is a program bringing together Palestinian and Israeli young leaders through technology and entrepreneurship. Working in partnership with the Massachusetts Institute of Technology (MIT) since 2004, MEET's goal is to educate and empower the next generation of Israeli and Palestinian leaders to take action towards positive social and political change in the Middle East.

As of 2026, over 1000 alumni have graduated from the three-year program.

== Structure ==
MEET teaches computer science, entrepreneurship, and leadership to excelling high school students (ages 15–17) over three years. It is highly selective; with a <8% acceptance rate. The program comprises three consecutive summers with volunteer instructors from MIT and weekly program sessions in the two intervening years at the MEET hubs in Jerusalem and Nazareth, taught by MEET alumni. Run entirely in English, the program provides MEET's 300 high school students with the skills, values, and network to become "agents of change" in the region. Students learn intensive computer science, entrepreneurship, and engage in a dialogue curriculum called "Deeper Understanding." Graduates of the program stay connected through the Alumni Program and continue developing social and business projects at the MEET Venture Lab in Jerusalem, in partnership with Google.

The students are from the West Bank, Jerusalem (East and West), and the Nazareth area. Students are distributed across gender and nationality and gain an understanding of each other and the conflict through working on projects with real-world impact.

The entire program is conducted in English. Neither students nor instructors pay to participate.

== History ==
MEET was founded in 2004 by a group of young Israeli and Palestinian students and professionals. At the start, it was three friends: Anat Binur, a graduate student in political science at MIT; her brother, Yaron Binur; and Assaf Harlap, who came up with the idea. Soon after, Palestinian friends Abeer Hazboun and Sandra Ashhab joined the team. A large number of its alumni have gone on to study at elite universities, including MIT, Harvard, Oxford, Brown, Yale, Penn, and Columbia.

Its work has been featured in article in the Boston Globe, Forbes and New York Times.

== Purpose ==
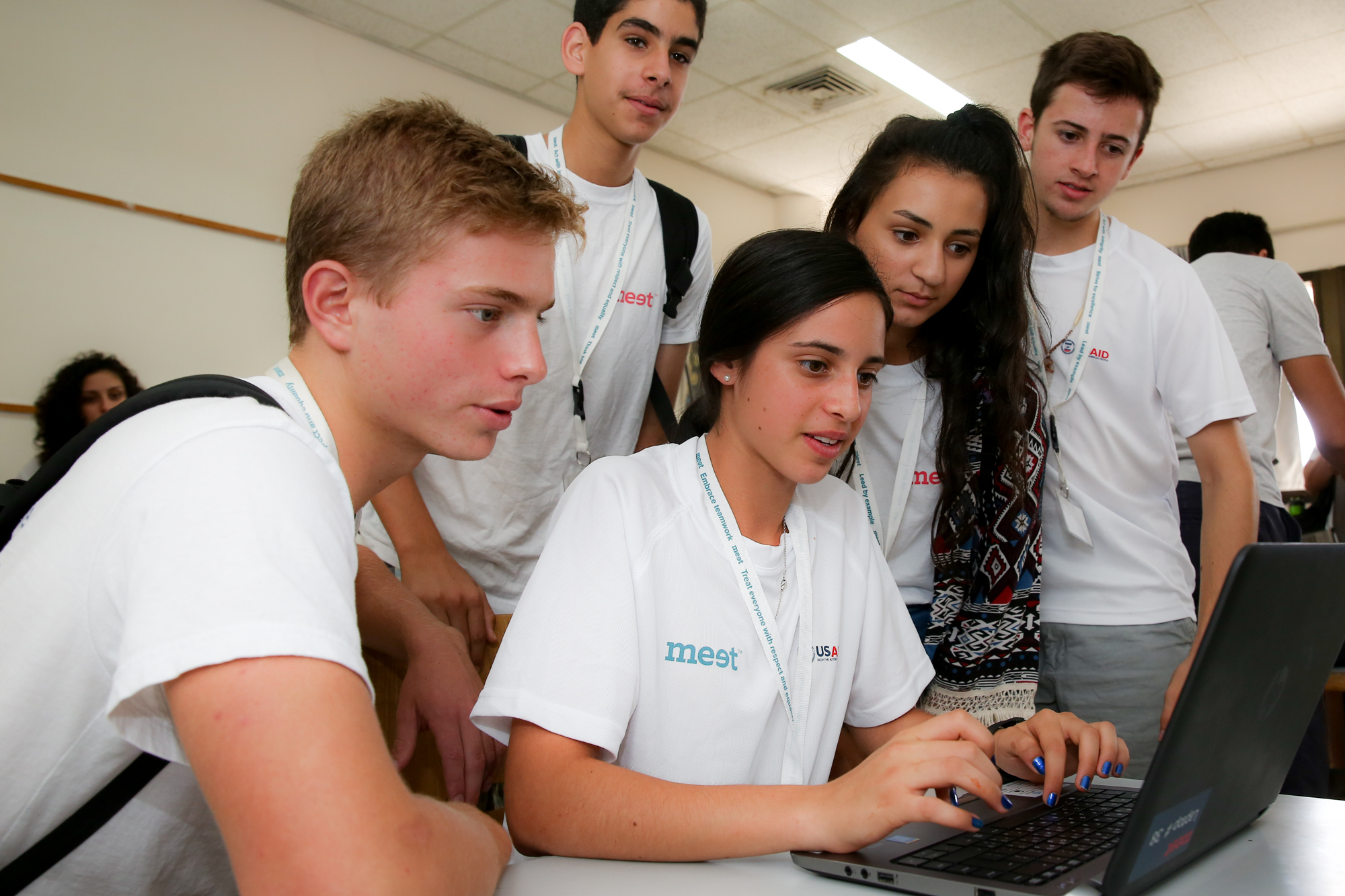
Year 3 Summer Program 2016 MEET students

The program is designed to empower Israeli and Palestinian youth through education and technology. By connecting students through joint interests and opportunities to learn about each other, the program tries to empower young people.

MEET is grounded in the vision of developing common ground between Israeli and Palestinian youth, providing a safe forum for them to meet and discover one another's cultures and explore similarities and differences.

MEET is affiliated with MIT.

== See also ==
- Middle East
- Projects working for peace among Arabs and Israelis
- Seeds of Peace
- Cross-cultural communication
