= Hatta, Gaza =

Hatta
- Etymology: Hatteh
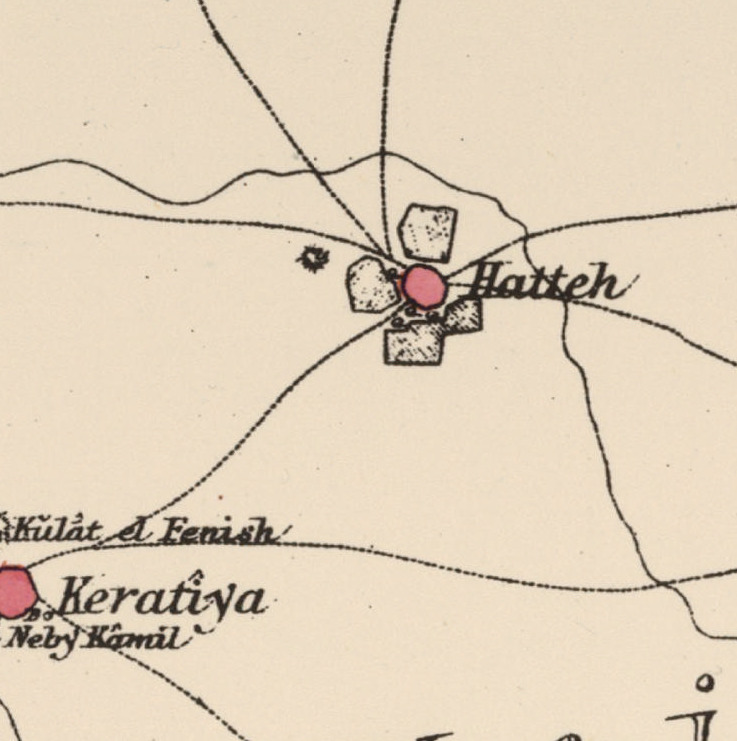
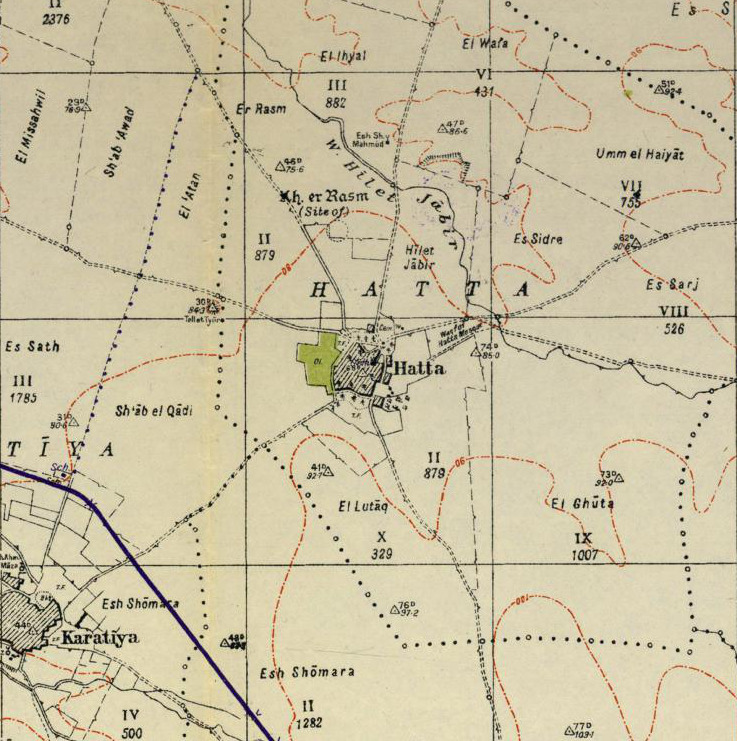
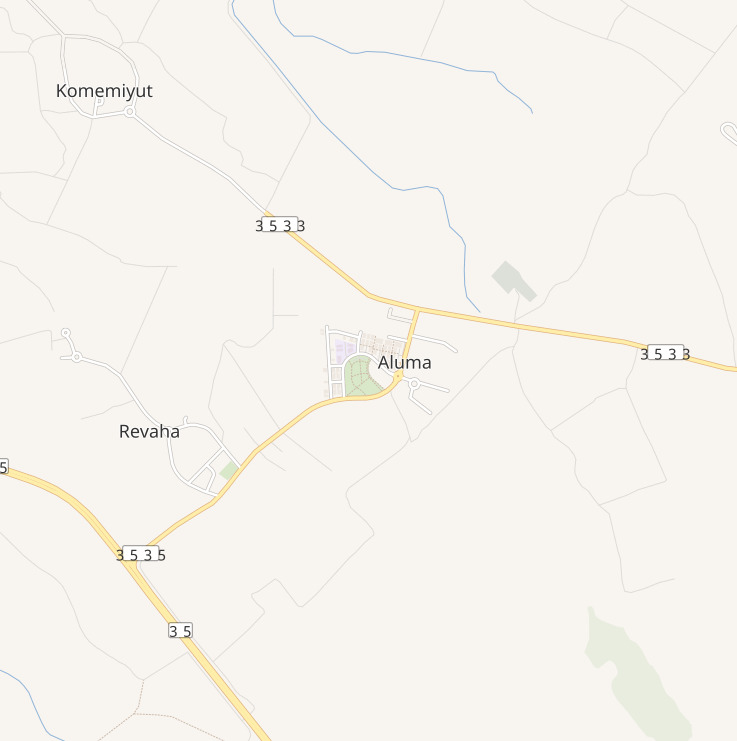
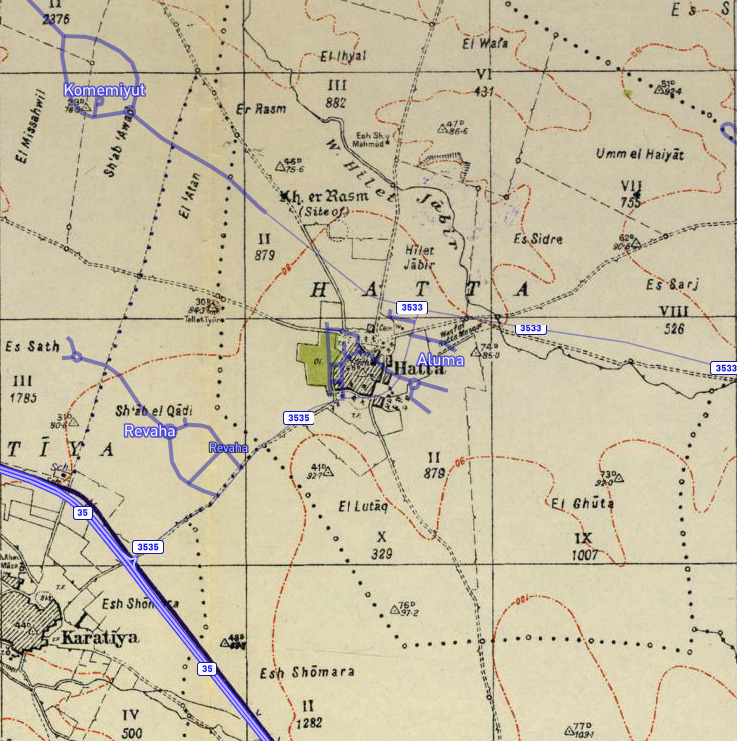
- 1870s map 1940s map modern map 1940s with modern overlay map A series of historical maps of the area around Hatta, Gaza (click the buttons)

- Location within Mandatory Palestine
- Coordinates: 31°39′06″N 34°44′28″E
- Palestine grid: 125/117
- Geopolitical entity: Mandatory Palestine
- Subdistrict: Gaza
- Date of depopulation: July 17–18, 1948

Area
  - Total: 5,305 dunams (5.305 km^{2}; 2.048 sq mi)

Population (1945)
  - Total: 970
- Cause(s) of depopulation: Military assault by Yishuv forces
- Current Localities: Zavdiel, Aluma

Hatta (Arabic: حتا) was a Palestinian Arab village of 1,125 inhabitants that was depopulated after a July 17, 1948 assault by Israeli forces of the Givati Brigade during the 1948 Arab-Israeli war. Following the war the area was incorporated into the State of Israel and Zavdiel and Aluma were established on the land that had belonged to Hatta.

== Location ==
The village was situated in a flat area on the southern coastal plain. It was probably named after the al-Hut tribe, originally from Najd in central Arabia, who camped near the site at the end of the fifth century A.D.

== History ==
The Arab geographer Yaqut al-Hamawi (d. 1228) referred to the village as Hattawa and said it was the home of the Islamic scholar ´Amru al-Hattawi.

The village's residents came from Egypt, Transjordan and the Hejaz.

=== Ottoman era ===
Hatta, like the rest of Palestine, was incorporated into the Ottoman Empire in 1517, and in the tax registers of 1596 it appeared under the name of Hatta as-Sajara as being in the nahiya of Gazza, part of the Sanjak of Gaza. It had a population of 15 households, all Muslim. The inhabitants paid a fixed tax rate of 25% on wheat, barley, sesame, goats and/or beehives; a total of 5,600 akçe.

During the 17th and 18th centuries, the area of Hatta experienced a significant process of settlement decline due to nomadic pressures on local communities. The residents of abandoned villages moved to surviving settlements, but the land continued to be cultivated by neighboring villages.

Edward Robinson passed by the village in 1838, and described its houses as being made of adobe bricks. It was also noted as a Muslim village in the Gaza district.

In 1863 Victor Guérin visited the village, which he estimated to have 600 inhabitants. He noticed that beside the well were four barrels of broken columns, three gray-white marble, and the fourth of bluish marble. The latter, placed horizontally at the orifice was deeply furrowed by the rope that animals or men had used to raise the water. In a oualy dedicated to Neby Amran he noticed some stones with the same ancient look. Around the village were large plantations of tobacco, here and there also stood several groups of beautiful pine, olive and fig trees.

An Ottoman village list of about 1870 showed that Hatta had 78 houses and a population of 211, though the population count included only men.

In 1883 the PEF's Survey of Western Palestine (SWP) described the village as being surrounded by gardens, some of which contained a few tamarisk trees. SWP also wrote that the name Hatteh preserved the name of the Hittites.

=== British Mandate era ===
In the 1922 census of Palestine, conducted by the British Mandate authorities, Hatta had a population of 570 Muslims, increasing in the 1931 census to 646, still all Muslim, in 140 houses.

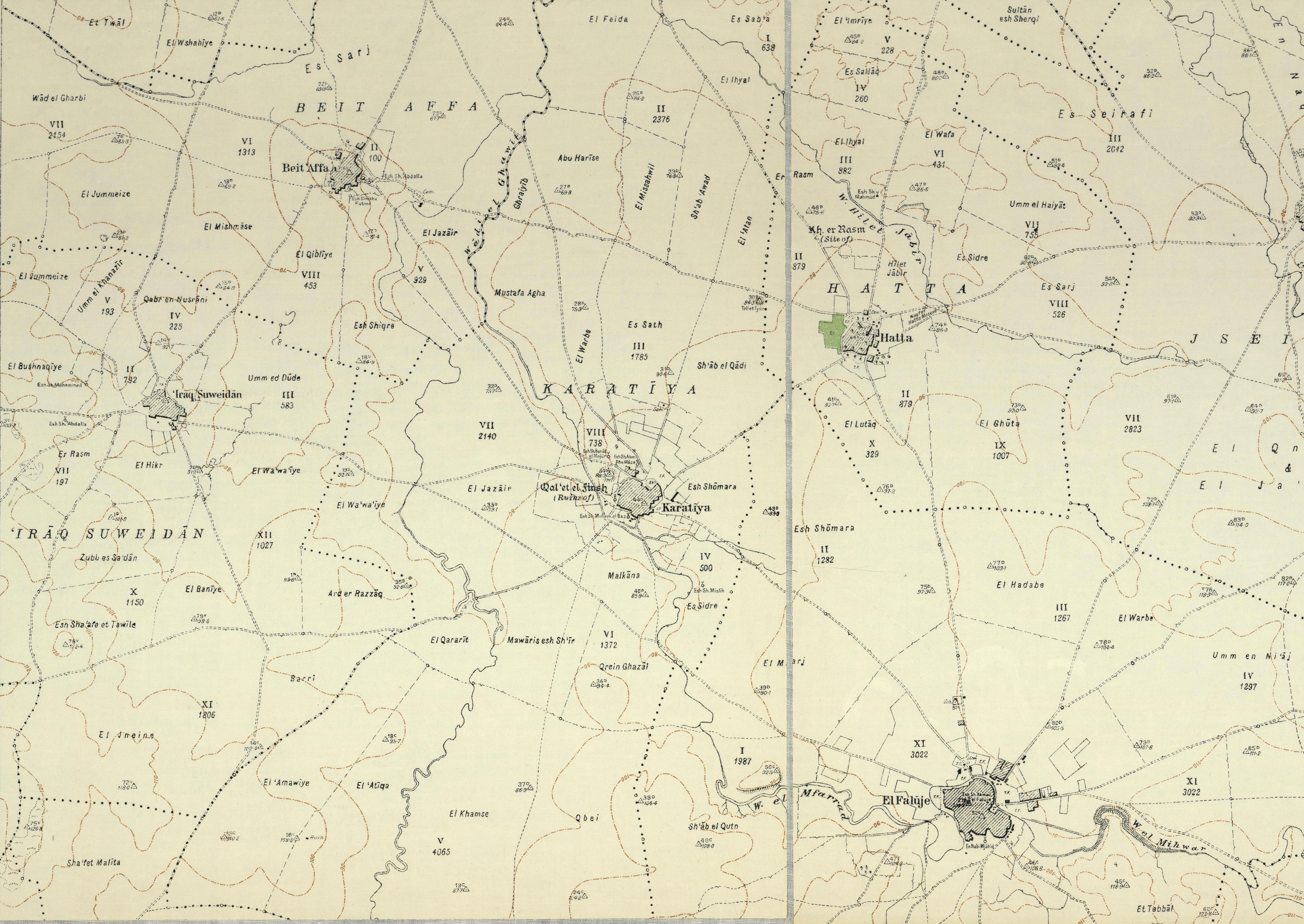
Hatta 1930 1:20,000

In the 1945 statistics Hatta had a population of 970 Muslims, with 5,305 dunams of land, according to an official land and population survey. Of this, 4 dunams were plantations and irrigable land, 5,108 used for cereals, while 45 dunams were built-up land.

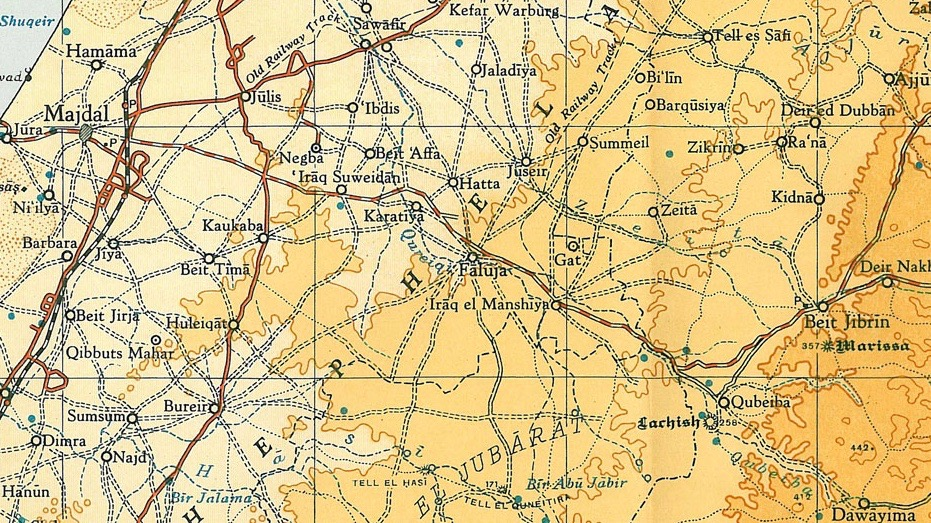
Hatta 1945 1:250,000

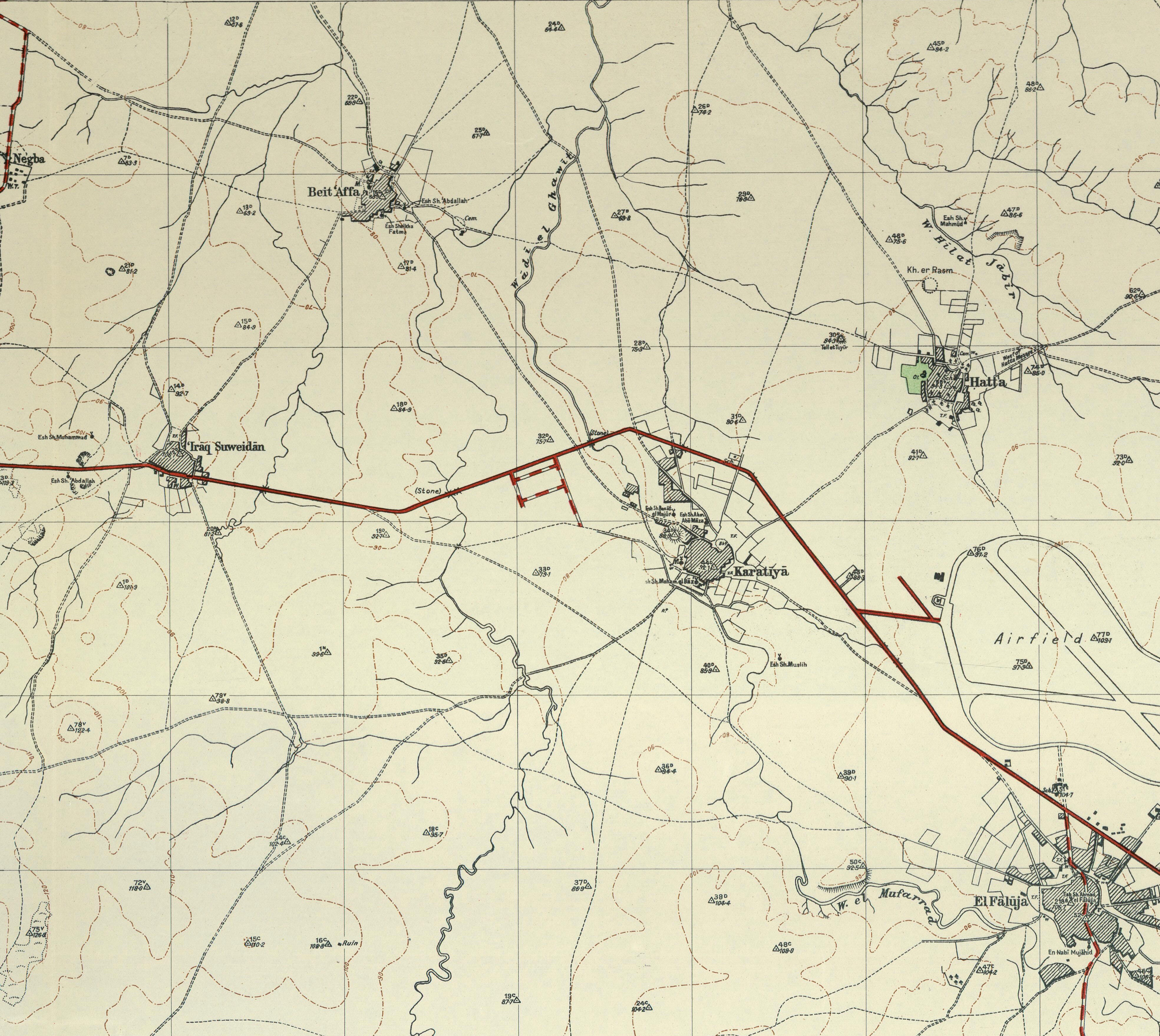
Hatta 1948 1:20,000

=== 1948 and after ===
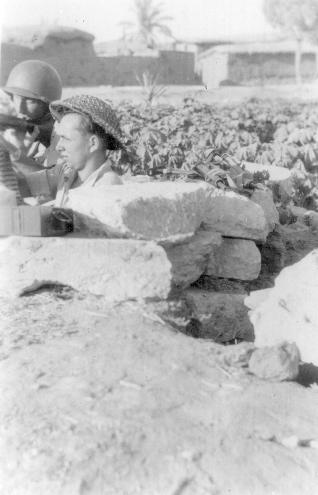
Yiftach Brigade position in Hatta, 1948

Hatta was captured on July 17–18, 1948, during Operation Death to the Invader, the last operation of the Ten Days period—the period between the two ceasefires of the 1948 Arab–Israeli War. Following the war the area was incorporated into the State of Israel and in August 1948 a moshav named Revaha was slated to be built on the site. However, the plan was not implemented until 1953. Another moshav, Zavdiel was established in 1950 on village land, while Aluma was founded on village land in 1965. Qomemiyyut and Rewacha are both close by, but not on village land.

Walid Khalidi described the village site in 1992: "A small portion of the site is covered by a forest, planted by Israelis. The debris of houses are scattered under the trees. Sycamore trees and cactuses also grow on the site. The surrounding lands are cultivated. The British built military airport is still in use."

== See also ==
- Operation An-Far
- Depopulated Palestinian locations in Israel

== Bibliography ==
- Barron, J.B., ed. (1923). Palestine: Report and General Abstracts of the Census of 1922. Government of Palestine.
- Conder, C.R.; Kitchener, H.H. (1883). The Survey of Western Palestine: Memoirs of the Topography, Orography, Hydrography, and Archaeology. Vol. 3. London: Committee of the Palestine Exploration Fund.
- Government of Palestine, Department of Statistics (1945). Village Statistics, April, 1945.
- Guérin, V. (1869). Description Géographique Historique et Archéologique de la Palestine. Vol. 1: Judee, pt. 2. Paris, L'Imprimerie Imp.
- Hadawi, S. (1970). Village Statistics of 1945: A Classification of Land and Area ownership in Palestine. Palestine Liberation Organization Research Center.
- Hartmann, M. (1883). "Die Ortschaftenliste des Liwa Jerusalem in dem türkischen Staatskalender für Syrien auf das Jahr 1288 der Flucht (1871)". Zeitschrift des Deutschen Palästina-Vereins. 6: 102–149.
- Hütteroth, W.-D.; Abdulfattah, K. (1977). Historical Geography of Palestine, Transjordan and Southern Syria in the Late 16th Century. Erlanger Geographische Arbeiten, Sonderband 5. Erlangen, Germany: Vorstand der Fränkischen Geographischen Gesellschaft. ISBN 3-920405-41-2.
- Khalidi, W. (1992). All That Remains: The Palestinian Villages Occupied and Depopulated by Israel in 1948. Washington D.C.: Institute for Palestine Studies. ISBN 0-88728-224-5.
- Mills, E., ed. (1932). Census of Palestine 1931. Population of Villages, Towns and Administrative Areas. Jerusalem: Government of Palestine.
- Morris, B. (2004). The Birth of the Palestinian Refugee Problem Revisited. Cambridge University Press. ISBN 978-0-521-00967-6.
- Palmer, E.H. (1881). The Survey of Western Palestine: Arabic and English Name Lists Collected During the Survey by Lieutenants Conder and Kitchener, R. E. Transliterated and Explained by E.H. Palmer. Committee of the Palestine Exploration Fund.
- Robinson, E.; Smith, E. (1841). Biblical Researches in Palestine, Mount Sinai and Arabia Petraea: A Journal of Travels in the year 1838. Vol. 2. Boston: Crocker & Brewster.
- Robinson, E.; Smith, E. (1841). Biblical Researches in Palestine, Mount Sinai and Arabia Petraea: A Journal of Travels in the year 1838. Vol. 3. Boston: Crocker & Brewster.
- Socin, A. (1879). "Alphabetisches Verzeichniss von Ortschaften des Paschalik Jerusalem". Zeitschrift des Deutschen Palästina-Vereins. 2: 135–163.
- Wallach, J., ed. (1978). "Security". Carta's Atlas of Israel (in Hebrew). Vol. First Years 1948–1961. Carta Jerusalem.
