= October 2000 protests in Israel =

Civil unrest among Israeli Arabs

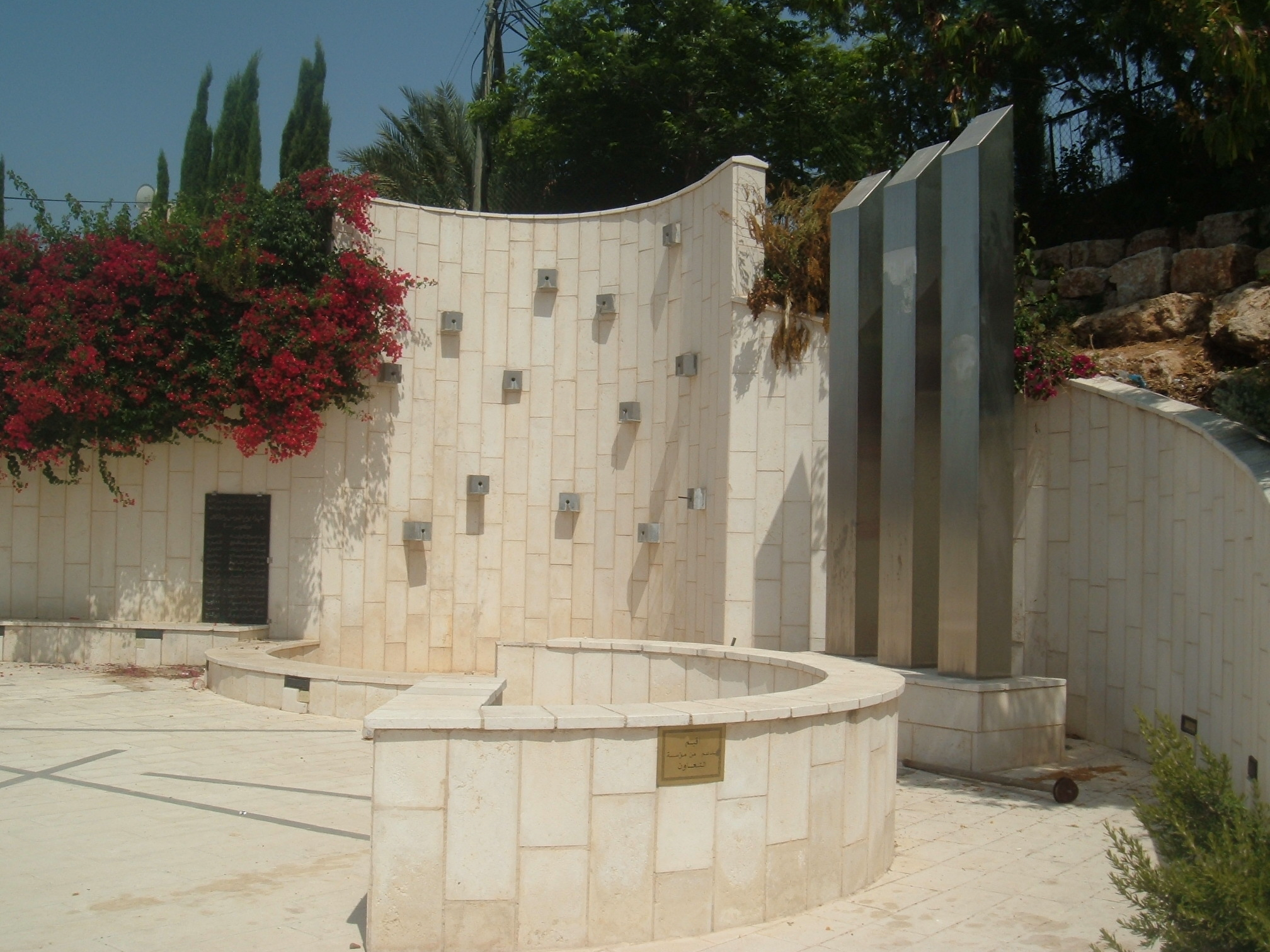
Monument to Israeli Arab casualties in October 2000 riots, Nazareth

The October 2000 protests, also known as October 2000 events, were a series of protests in Arab villages in northern Israel in October 2000 that turned violent, escalating into rioting by Israeli Arabs, which led to counter-rioting by Israeli Jews and clashes with the Israel Police and ending in the killing of 13 Arab demonstrators and 1 Israeli Jew.

The Or Commission was established to investigate the police response to the rioting. Israeli media outlets refer to the episode as אירועי אוקטובר 2000 - the "October 2000 events" while the Arab community refers to it as the "October ignition" (Arabic: هبة أكتوبر, romanized: hibba ʾUktūbir).

== Background ==
In September 2000, tensions between the police and Israel's Arab citizens rose. On 12 September, Israel Police Northern District Commander Alik Ron requested an investigation of Hadash MK Mohammad Barakeh for inciting violence against police. At a meeting of the High Follow-up Committee for Arab citizens in Israel the next day in Kafar Manda, United Arab List's MK Abdulmalik Dehamshe declared: "We will beat or forcefully attack any policeman and we will break his hands if he comes to demolish an Arab house … we are on the verge of an Intifada among Israel's Arabs following Alik Ron's incitement."

On 14 September, Nazareth declared a general strike protesting "police incompetence in handling violence and crime" after the murder of a local resident, Nabieh Nussier, 52. On 30 September, the High Follow-up Committee called on the Arab community to mount a general strike to protest the killings of five Palestinians by Israeli police in the Jerusalem clashes of the previous day, which many consider the first day of the Second Intifada.

Demonstrations in Arab towns in northern Israel began to spread after repeated airings of news footage showing the alleged shooting death of 12-year-old Muhammad al-Durrah, who was said to have been caught in the crossfire between Israeli forces and Palestinian militia.

== Timeline ==
=== 1 October ===
Arab demonstrations and acts of civil-disobedience in solidarity with the Palestinians turned violent following the proclamation of a general strike by the Arab Higher Monitoring Committee to protest the deaths of Arab rioters in Jerusalem the previous day. Arab rioting took place throughout northern Israel. Violence occurred in Umm al-Fahm, Nazareth, Acre, Fureidis, and villages throughout the Galilee. In a number of areas police came under gunfire, and demonstrators threw Molotov cocktails. An Egged bus was torched in Umm al-Fahm.

Israel Police officers and Border Police gendarmes responded with live ammunition, tear gas, and rubber bullets. At the entrance to Umm al-Fahm, police used sniper rifles to prevent the Wadi Ara road from being blocked. Israeli-Arabs Muhammad Ahmad 'Eiq Al-Jabarin and Ibrahim Sayyam Al-Jabarin and Gaza resident Misleh Abu Jarad were killed. About 75 people, including Umm al-Fahm mayor Raed Salah, were wounded.

=== 2 October ===
Police dispersed an Arab demonstration in Arraba with tear gas and live ammunition. Alaa Nassar, 18, and Asel Asleh, 17, were killed.

Demonstrators in Nazareth threw stones, burned tires, looted and burned shops. 100 demonstrators were hurt, including one woman who was seriously injured. Dozens of residents of Mashhad approaching a Jewish neighbourhood of Nazareth Illit and smashed house and car windows.

Traffic was blocked with burning tires on Route 65, a main artery connecting northern and central Israel. A Jewish man was attacked and pulled from his car by local youth, which they then torched. Three banks in Baqa al-Gharbiyye were set on fire.

=== 3 October ===
Ramez Bushnak, 24, from Kafr Manda, was shot in the head and died the same day during a confrontation with police, who explicitly denied claims that he was shot from close range. Dozens of residents clashed with police blocking the way to Jewish neighbourhoods in Misgav. The funerals of those killed in previous days became focal points of renewed clashes.

Extensive forest fires which Israel Police believed were the result of Arab arsonists caused the evacuations of some residents.

=== 4–6 October ===
Following the meeting between Barak and the Arab Higher Monitoring Committee, a general calm reigned with only minimal violence, including on 6 October, on which a "Palestinian day of rage" had been announced by Hamas. On 4 October, hundreds of Arab residents of Jaffa burned tires, threw rocks, and beat some reporters.

On 6 October mourners in Kafr Kanna at a funeral of one of those killed in clashes stoned and moderately injured a Jewish motorist from Tiberias. The next day, hundreds of Jewish youth in Tiberias burned tires, attacked a mosque, and attempted to assault Arabs. Dozens of haredi youth stoned Arab traffic in Jerusalem and attacked Palestinian labourers, who were subsequently rescued by police.

=== 7 October ===
Jewish and Arab youth threw rocks at each other near a shopping mall on the border between Jewish and Arab neighbourhoods in Nazareth. Arab traffic in Nazareth Illit was stoned. In Tiberias, mosques, Arab passersby businesses all suffered damages, and the attacks were repeated two days later. A gas station at the Golani Junction was torched, and police attempting to stop the attacks there on Arabs were themselves attacked.

A Jewish citizen, Bachor Jann, from Rishon LeZion, was killed after being hit by a stone thought to have been thrown by those taking part in the protests in Jisr az-Zarqa while driving on the Haifa-Tel Aviv freeway. A scuffle at an Or Akiva shopping mall between Jewish and Arab citizens resulted in an attack on the responding police and the throwing of a Molotov cocktail.

=== 8 October ===
Jews from Nazareth Illit, including apparently many Russian-speakers, attacked Arabs and their homes and businesses in Nazareth on the eve of Yom Kippur. Police, informed of the intention to attack Arabs, beefed up their forces and deployed them on the seam line between the two communities. When hundreds of Jewish youths from Nazareth Illit came down to throw stones and vandalize Arab properties, however, the police did not impede them. The Arab residents emerged from their homes to defend them, and reciprocal stone throwing clashes ensued. Police dispersed the riots with tear gas and live ammunition. Two Arabs, Omar Akawi and Wissam Yazbek, were shot dead, the latter by a gunshot wound to the head, fired by a policeman from behind him. The shooters were never identified.

Three Arab-owned apartments were torched in Tel Aviv, and hundreds clashed with police. Demonstrators chased two Arab employees out of a restaurant and set fire to it which damaged two Arab-owned cars parked in front.

=== 9 October ===
Hundreds of Jews rioted in Nazareth, breaking windows in a shopping mall and torching two cars. The mayor of Karmiel was attacked when he tried to calm Jewish citizens there. Arab property in Bat Yam and Petah Tikva was vandalized.

A large police force was required to thwart hundreds of demonstrators in Tel Aviv's Hatikva Quarter and in Bat Yam from attacking Jaffa.

In Afula, roughly 700 Jewish demonstrators blocked Route 65 with boulders, and assaulted a policeman. 100 of the protestors broke off and tried to enter the Arab village of Nein, until police thwarted them.

In Acre, hundreds of Jewish rioters vandalized Arab shops and cars owned by Arabs.

The newspaper Al-Ittihad reported that four men stabbed an Arab worker on his way to work at a supermarket in Rosh HaAyin. In Jaffa, a mosque was torched as police looked on. Attempts were made to burn Jewish apartments and two synagogues. In Ramla, a synagogue was torched and traffic was stoned and firebombed. In Lod, a Jewish citizen was shot, a school was burned down, and attempts were made to torch a police station.

In Nazareth, a crowd of mourners from the funerals of the two demonstrators killed a day earlier approached the police station and threw rocks and firebombs at it, despite the police's decision to keep all officers inside and out of sight until quiet set in. The police responded with tear-gas; when the stone-throwing continued, the assistant-mayor and two Arab Knesset members on the scene guaranteed a cessation in exchange for a police retreat, which they did. Arab youths also vandalized traffic signals at the Canyon Junction.

In Migdal HaEmek, Jewish residents blocked the main road and stoned cars believed to be owned by Arabs. A number of stoners were detained, and teenagers marched on the police station insisting on their release, with rocks being thrown at police, resulting in one being wounded.

Several hundred youth from Umm al-Fahm stoned dozens of passing vehicles on Highway 65 and vandalized utility poles. The assistant mayor unsuccessfully attempted to stop the youths per agreements with police to avoid their involvement. The police still decided to keep distance, and the Umm-al-Fahm municipality finally cleared debris from the road allowing it to be reopened.

=== 10 October ===
11 Arab businesses inside Acre's historic old quarter were vandalized.

== Reactions ==
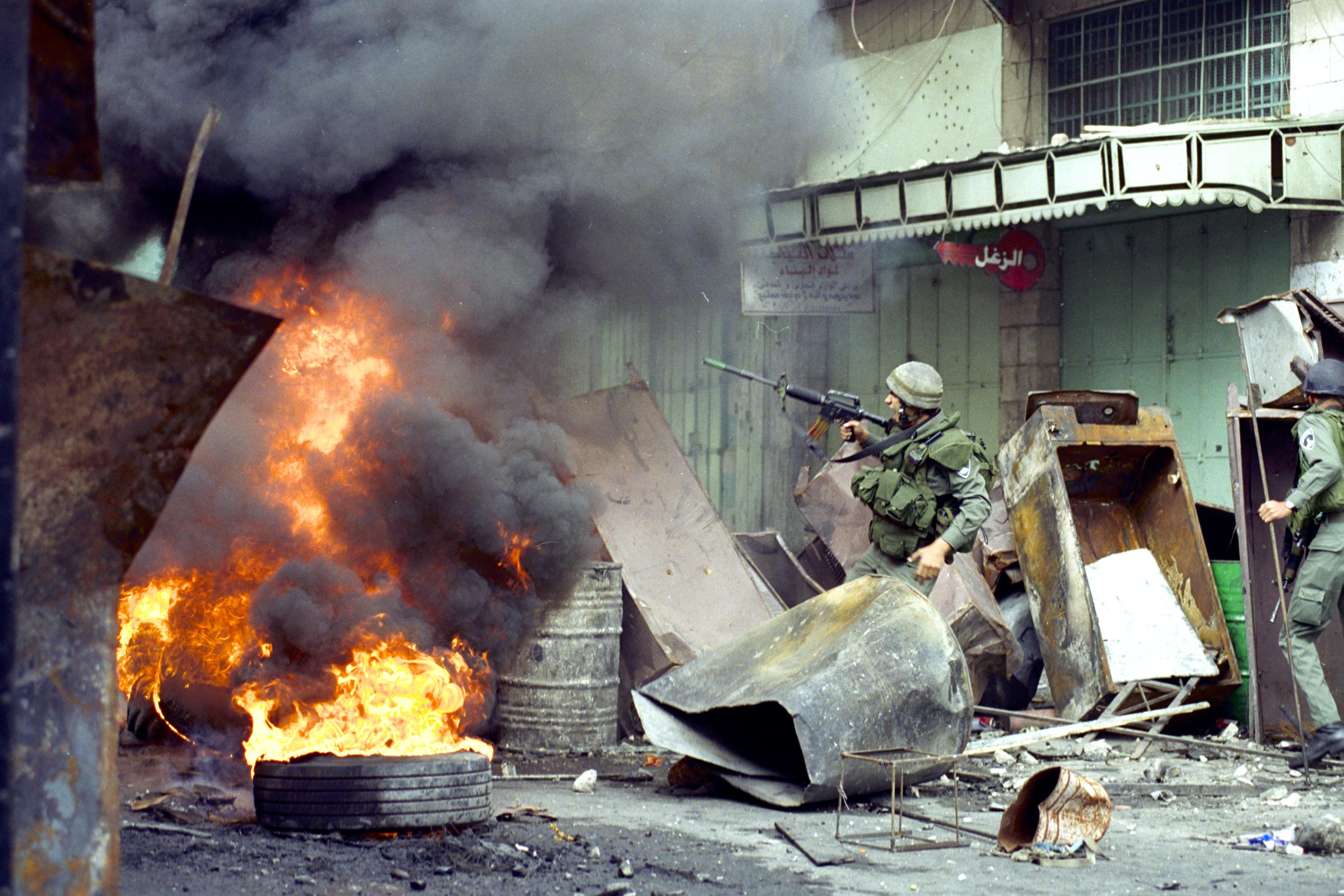
Israeli soldiers confronting Palestinian rioters in Hebron, October 2000

According to the Arab media organization I'lam the media coverage of the events of October 2000 created an atmosphere of war inside Israel, painting Arab citizens as violent rioters displaying their disloyalty to the state through riots; I'lam and other Arab organizations say that overall Arab citizens engaged in peaceful protest during October 2000, and that the entire population was treated in blanket fashion as a rioting 'fifth column.'

The Arab Association for Human Rights, Adalah, Mossawa, I'lam, and other Arab NGOs in Israel cited "deep rooted frustration [of Arabs] at their own status as second class Israeli citizens", as an underlying factor. The Arab youth organization Baladna was formed partially in response to the events of October 2000. According to Marwan Dwairy, the events of October 2000 are "an important landmark in the narrative of the Arab Palestinian citizens of Israel."

The Or commission report, which was established to investigate the events of October 2000, found a pattern of government "prejudice and neglect" towards the Arab-Israeli minority. The commission stated that Israeli establishment insensitivity had allowed widespread discrimination against Arab Israelis leading to the "combustible atmosphere" that led to the riots. The commission was critical of the police's use of excessive force to quell the riots including the use of sniper fire to disperse crowds. In conclusion the commission said that Israel "must educate its police that the Arab public is not the enemy, and should not be treated as such."

In 2005, the Israel Police Internal Investigations Department decided not to indict any officers involved in the events. The decision was supported by the Israeli State Prosecutor's Office. In 2008, following a review of the case by Israeli Attorney General Menachem Mazuz and Police Internal Investigations Department Chief Herzl Shviro, Mazuz accepted the State Prosecutor's Office recommendation and decided not to press charges against any police officers and close the case, declaring that a re-examination of the gathered in the Or Commission and Police Internal Investigations Department's report found no evidence of criminal conduct by police.

== See also ==
- Land Day
- September 1961 Gaza border incident
- Timeline of the Israeli–Palestinian conflict in 2000
- Or Commission
