= John Wallach =

American journalist (1943–2002)

John Paul Wallach
- Born: January 18, 1943; New York City
- Died: July 10, 2002 (aged 59)
- Education: Master's degree, New School for Social Research, two honorary doctorate degrees
- Occupations: Journalist, Author and Founder of Seeds of Peace
- Employer: Hearst newspapers
- Spouse: Janet Wallach
- Children: Two children
- Parent(s): Paul and Edith Wallach
- Awards: Multiple awards including the Soviet Medal of Friendship

John Paul Wallach, (January 18, 1943 – July 10, 2002) born in New York City, was an American journalist, and author. He served as foreign editor and diplomatic correspondent for Hearst newspapers for nearly 30-years, traveling to more than 70 countries with five different Presidents, Lyndon B. Johnson, Richard Nixon, Gerald Ford, Jimmy Carter, and Ronald Reagan.

After the 1993 World Trade Center bombing, Wallach founded Seeds of Peace, an international summer camp that brings children together from all over the world who are dealing with war and conflict. After the September 11 attacks, Wallach hosted a five-day conference that brought visitors and representatives from all over the world to support the prevention of terrorism.

Wallach was the son of German Jews, Paul and Edith Wallach, who escaped Nazi Germany in 1941, after the government took possession of their family's clothing factory. Wallach died of lung cancer in New York City; he was survived by his wife, Janet, and two sons.

== Background and education ==
Wallach was the son of German Jews, Paul and Edith Wallach, who escaped Nazi Germany in 1941, after the government took possession of their family's clothing factory.

Wallach attended Scarsdale High School, in New York, graduating in 1960. He graduated in 1964 from Middlebury College. While in school, Wallach started his own radio show. He also enrolled in theatre studies at New York University but only attended the school for a term. He obtained his master's degree from the New School for Social Research in Manhattan, New York.

Wallach was awarded a teaching fellowship by the Woodrow Wilson National Foundation in 1984, and was a senior fellow at the United States Institute of Peace in 1998. He received an honorary doctorate from Middlebury in 1999 and an honorary doctorate from the University of Southern Maine.

== Career ==
Wallach served as foreign editor and diplomatic correspondent for Hearst Newspapers, joining the Washington office in 1968; he served with the organization until 1995. During his career, Wallach traveled to more than 70 countries with five different Presidents, Lyndon B. Johnson, Richard Nixon, Gerald Ford, Jimmy Carter, and Ronald Reagan. He made multiple appearances on NBC's "Meet the Press" and "60 Minutes."

In 1972, Wallach was elected as president of the State Department Correspondents Association, representing over 400 correspondents in 30 countries. He was the first Visiting Affairs Correspondent for the BBC in 1980. In 1984, Wallach, as a fellow with the Woodrow Wilson National Fellowship Foundation, taught a course for American University, titled, "Foreign Policy Processes and the Press." The course aired on WAMU-FM, for 12-weeks.

After the 1993 World Trade Center bombing, Wallach founded Seeds of Peace, a summer camp that brings children from opposite sides of conflict from around the world together. The first camp, opened in Otisfield, Maine, enrolled 46 teenagers. Hillary Clinton, in support of the organization, invited all 46 of the teens to the White House signing of the Israeli-PLO peace accords, finalized on September 14, 1993. In a 1995 interview, Wallach responding to questions about the success of the Seeds of Peace camp said:

"'It’s been the most gratifying thing I’ve ever done"..."When you see the tears flow, the embraces — and when you know the follow-up will be just as dramatic — you really get the sense that you can change things. That sense is very vital to my own psyche."'

— John Wallach, 'A Dreamer of Dreams' by James D. Besser, The New York Jewish Week

In 1995, Wallach retired from Hearst, in order to work full-time with Seeds of Peace. In 1999, a Seeds affiliate was opened in Jerusalem.

In 2001, two months after the September 11th terrorist attacks, Wallach and Seeds of Peace hosted a conference for five days in New York City. There were approximately 150 visitors and representatives from all over the world. The conference was to prevent terrorism. As a result of the conference, a charter was presented to the United Nations Secretary-General Kofi Annan, with recommendations on how to prevent terrorism. Later that same year, Wallach gave a special address to a joint session of the Maine Legislature about the Seeds of Peace camp and how the lives of the teenagers changed as a result of the program.

In 2002, Wallach died of lung cancer in New York City; he was survived by his wife, Janet, and two sons.

== Awards and recognition ==
Wallach was the recipient of multiple awards during his life, in recognition of his success as a journalist and humanitarian efforts. A selection of his awards is listed below.

- 1978 The Congressional Correspondents Award for his coverage of the Camp David Accords. The award was presented by President Jimmy Carter.
- 1985 Overseas Press Club Award for his series of radio programs based on his course on "foreign policy and the press."
- 1988 The Weintal Prize for Diplomatic Reporting (special citation). The award was presented by the Institute for the Study of Diplomacy, Georgetown University.
- 1991 The Soviet Medal of Friendship, from USSR President Mikail Gorbachev . The award is the highest civilian award.
- 1994 Washingtonian of the Year, Washingtonian magazine.
- 1997 The Jordanian Legion of Honor Medal, on behalf of the late His Majesty King Hussein of Jordan.
- 1998 and 2000 United Nations Educational, Scientific and Cultural Organization (UNESCO) Peace Prize
- 2002 International Advocate for Peace Award by the Benjamin N. Cardozo School of Law.
- 2002 International First Freedom Award by the Council for America's First Freedom.
- 2005 Wallach was posthumously named as a Distinguished Alumni of Scarsdale High School.

Wallach was also the recipient of the Edwin Hood Award for his foreign policy reporting in breaking the Iran-Contra story, three other Overseas Press Club awards, the B'nai Brith for exposing the plight of Soviet dissidents, and the 1978 Raymond Clapper Award for outstanding journalism (Second Place), given by the White House Correspondents' Association.

== Bibliography ==
A selection of Wallach's works is listed below. Middlebury College maintains a collection of his works, including video, audio, book drafts, articles and newswires.

- Still small voices, co-author with wife, Janet Wallach, Citadel Press, 1990.
- The new Palestinians: the emerging generation of leaders, co-author with wife, Janet Wallach, Prima Publishing, 1994.
- Arafat: in the eyes of the beholder, co-author with wife, Janet Wallach, Carol Publishing Group, 1997.
- The enemy has a face: the Seeds of Peace experience, co-author with son, Michael Wallach, United States Institute of Peace Press, 2000.

== See also ==
- List of peace activists
