= Seeds of Peace =

US-based non-profit organization

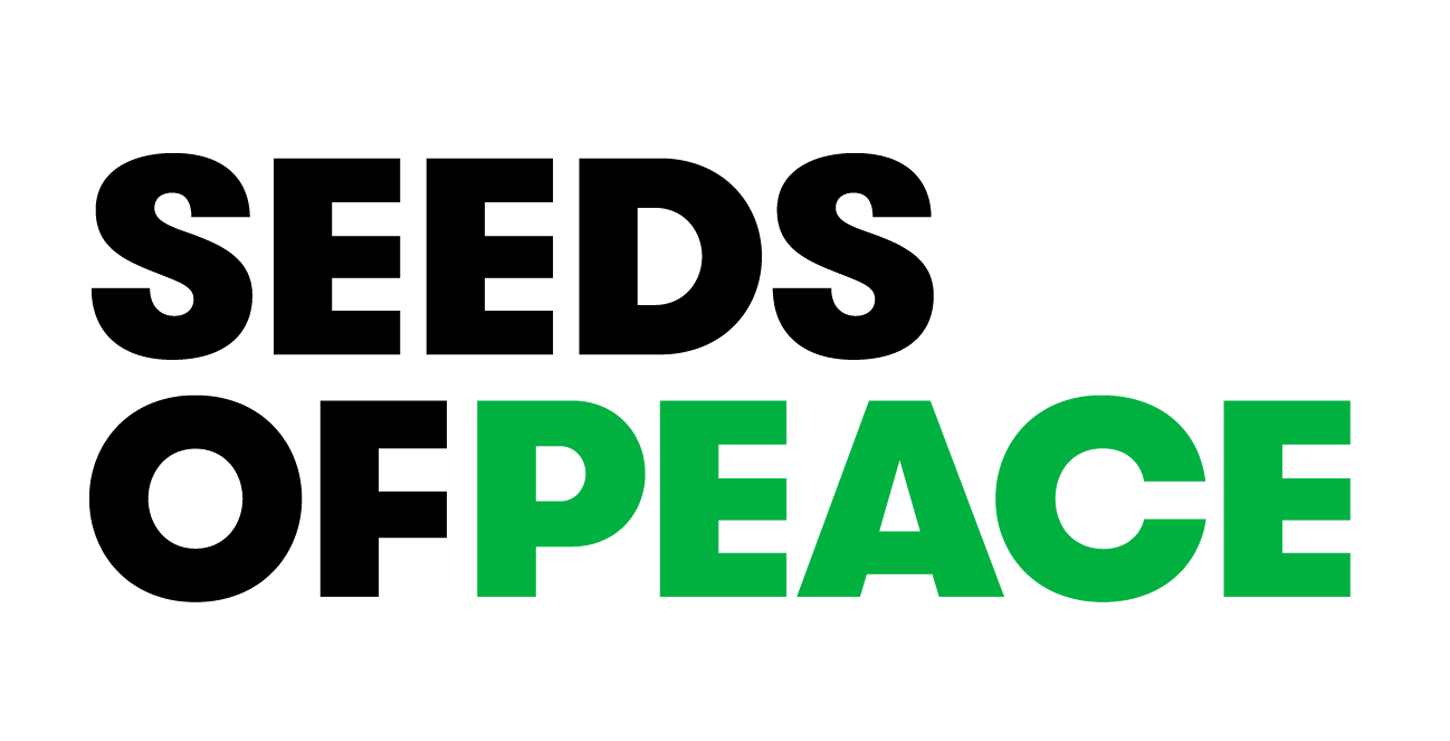
- Formation: 1993
- Type: Non-profit organization
- Headquarters: New York, New York, with offices in Jerusalem, Amman, Lahore, Mumbai.
- Budget: Over $6M
- Website: www.seedsofpeace.org

Seeds of Peace is a peacebuilding and leadership development non-profit organization headquartered in New York City. It was founded in 1993. As its main program, the organization brings youth and educators from areas of conflict to its summer camp. It also provides local programming to support Seeds of Peace graduates, known as Seeds, once they return home. It is a non-political organization that teaches youth peace-making skills.

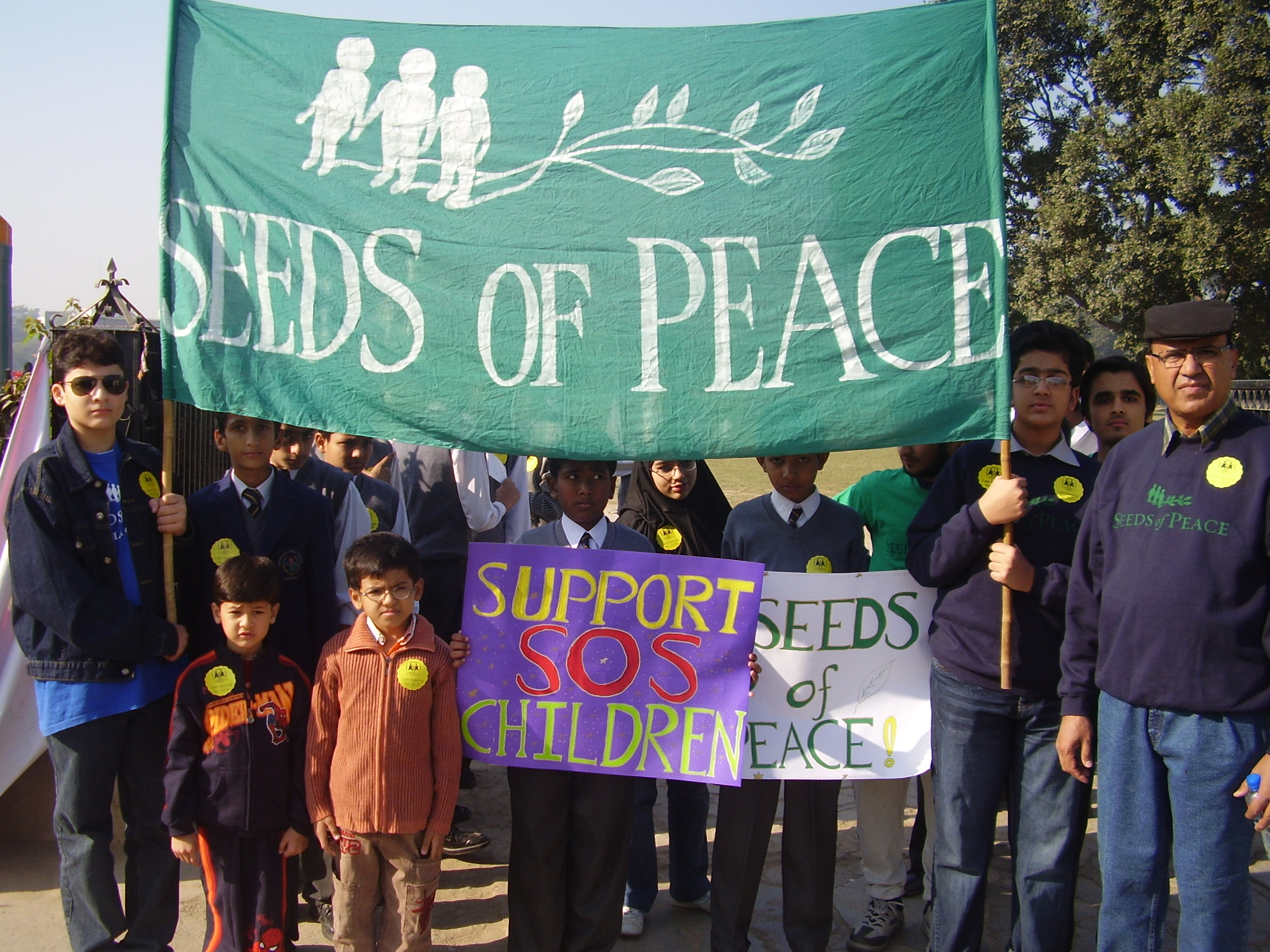
SOS Children's Village

== History ==
Seeds of Peace began in 1993 as an idea of the American journalist John Wallach. At a state dinner with politicians from Israel, Egypt, and the Palestinian Authority, Wallach proposed that they bring 15 youngsters from each of their respective countries to a new camp he was founding in Maine. These 46, including 3 Americans, ranging in age from 13 to 18, comprised the first session of the Seeds of Peace Camp, founded on the site of the former Camp Powhatan in Otisfield, Maine.

The campers from 1993 were later present at the signing ceremony of the Declaration of Principles (better known as the Oslo Accords) in Washington, D.C. President Bill Clinton, Israeli Prime Minister Yitzhak Rabin, Israeli Foreign Minister Shimon Peres, and PLO Chairman Yasir Arafat were photographed holding Seeds of Peace T-shirts.

From its start in 1993 through 2010, Seeds says that over 4,000 children have attended the camp. Children have attended from a wide variety of countries, with Seeds offices in Amman, Cairo, Gaza, Jerusalem, Kabul, Lahore, Mumbai, Otisfield, Ramallah, and Tel Aviv as of 2010.

A key goal of the Seeds of Peace program is to help teens have compassion for other people’s pain and challenge ideas that society has dictated to them.

== Organization ==
John Wallach's vision focused on leaders of the next generation. The need to establish its legitimacy at home inspired the creation of the Delegation Leaders Program. Delegation Leaders are educators from the countries in conflict; they take part in the selection and orientation of Seeds at home. They accompany the Seeds to and from camp. While at camp, participants speak English as the common language of the camp.

The organization supports returning Seeds with year-round programming, including dialogue sessions, cross-cultural visits, educational and leadership development workshops, and outreach events.

In 2001, Seeds of Peace expanded to South Asia, bringing together conflicting sides from Afghanistan, India and Pakistan.

=== Camper selection process ===
The selection takes about half a year, with most of the participants being 14–16 years old. Typically, applicants to Seeds of Peace apply through the school systems in their home countries. Applicants must demonstrate proficiency in English, leadership skills, and local politics. They are selected on the basis of interviews and written essays. Many of the first-time campers are chosen by the Ministries of Education or other government agencies in their respective countries.

=== Leadership ===
John Wallach, the founder of the organization, also served as its president until his death in 2002. He was succeeded by former State Department official Aaron David Miller, who left the job early in 2006. Later, Janet Wallach, wife of John Wallach, was named president emeritus, and Steven Flanders served for a time as the executive officer in charge. Starting in the spring of 2007, Nicolla Hewitt served briefly as president, until her departure in 2008. Leslie Adelson Lewin served as director from the fall of 2009 to 2019. In 2020, the organization announced Fr. Josh Thomas as its new executive director.

=== Offices ===
The organization's U.S. headquarters are located in New York City. Seeds of Peace has also opened central offices in Jerusalem and smaller offices in Amman, Cairo, Gaza, Kabul, Lahore, Mumbai, Otisfield, Ramallah, and Tel Aviv as of 2010. Programs for people in their 20s are expanding.

== Life after camp ==
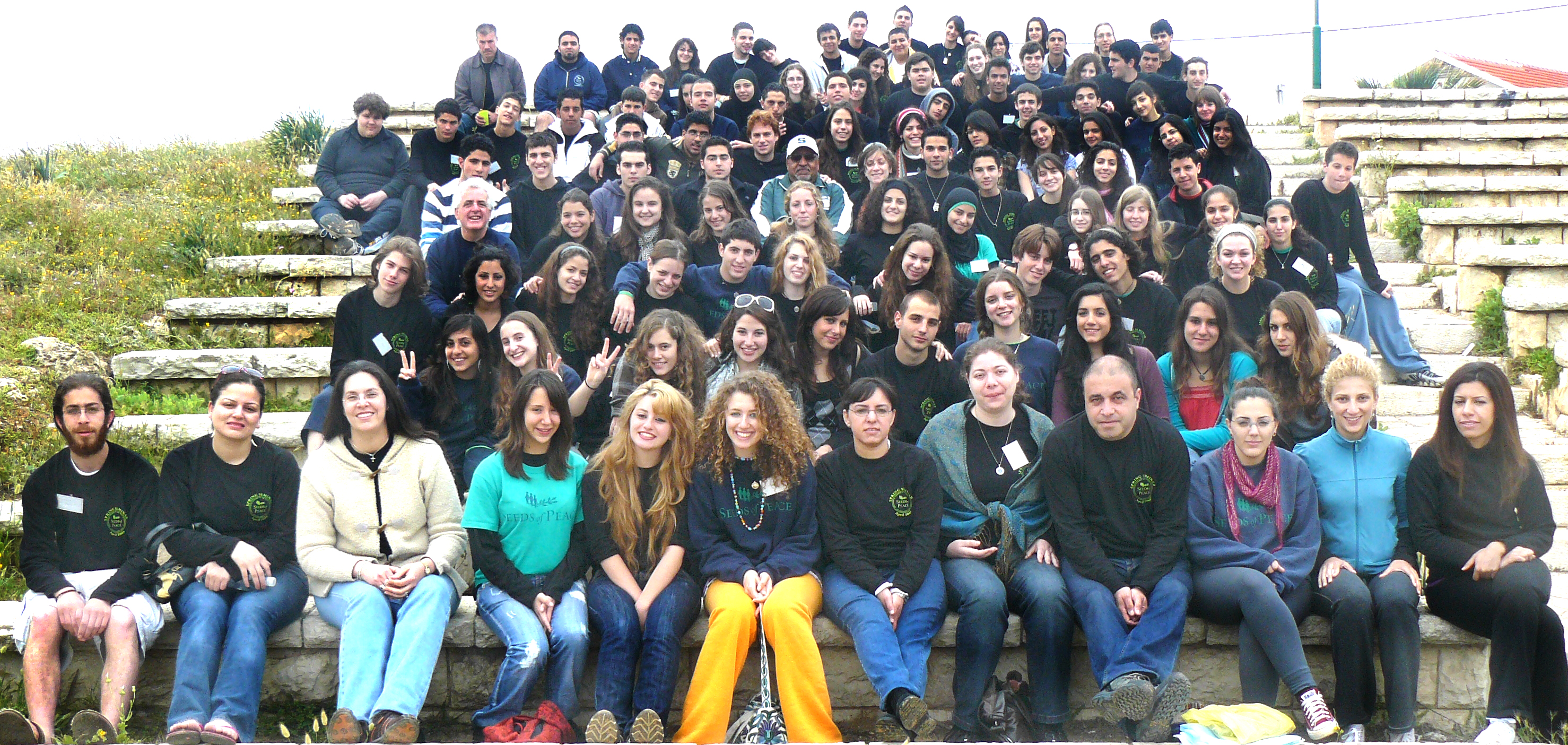
2009 Spring Seminar meeting between Palestinian, Israeli Arab and Jewish Israeli Seeds

Approximately 350 new Seeds graduate from Seeds of Peace every summer. After camp, the organization runs year-round regional programs for graduates in their home countries that focus on "four of the most important assets and abilities that leaders in conflict regions need to create meaningful change: strong relationships across lines of conflict; a sophisticated understanding of core conflict issues; practical skills in communication, critical thinking, and change-making; and the ability to take action on behalf of peace." Author John Wallach himself dedicated his book, The Enemy Has a Face: The Seeds of Peace Experience, to the organization.

=== The Olive Branch ===
From 1996 to 2012, the organization's graduates published a magazine, The Olive Branch, that summed up their activities over a period of several months. It included reports, poetry, essays, and photos.

=== Alumni ===
==== Asel Asleh ====
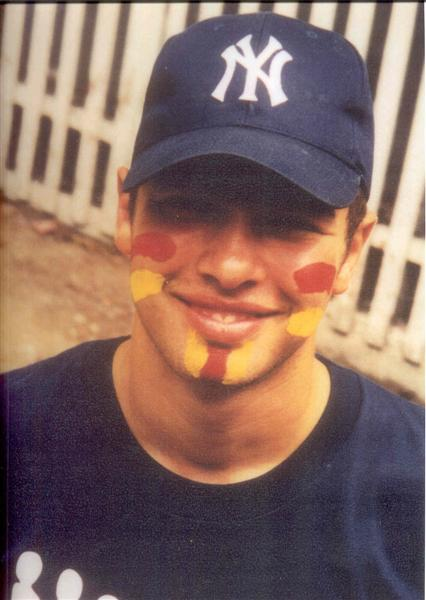
Asel Asleh at Seeds of Peace

On October 2, 2000, Asel Asleh, an Israeli Arab and graduate of the program, was killed by Israeli security forces during a demonstration. He was wearing the Seeds of Peace T-shirt at the time of the shooting and was subsequently buried in it.

Gracie Abrams

American singer-songwriter Gracie Abrams attended the program in 2016. The pop artist released a statement to social media referencing her time in the camp in the wake of the Gaza war.

== Criticism ==
In a fantasy-theme analysis of Seeds of Peace publications, Engstrom (2007) argues that organizations like Seeds of Peace unknowingly participate in sustaining the conflicts they seek to eliminate by rhetorically promoting peace, which places the burden of ending the conflict on future generations. Politicians and other stakeholders in the current conflict use their support for Seeds of Peace as a signal of their commitment to peace while remaining committed to military engagement.

== Hands of Peace ==
In 2024, Hands of Peace, a smaller U.S.-based nonprofit that held summer programs for Israeli, Palestinian and American youth closed down and merged with Seeds of Peace.

A notable alumna of the program is Naama Levy, one of the Israeli soldiers taken captive by Hamas when the Palestinian militant group stormed the Nahal Oz Army Base on October 7, 2023 and released on 25 January 2025 after 477 days in captivity.

== See also ==
- Alliance for Middle East Peace
- Arava Institute for Environmental Studies
- Combatants for Peace
- Givat Haviva International School
- Hand in Hand: Center for Jewish-Arab Education in Israel
- MEET - Middle East Education through Technology
- Neve Shalom – Wāħat as-Salām
- OneVoice Movement
- Sharaka
- Standing Together
- The Parents Circle-Families Forum
- Women Wage Peace

== Sources ==
- Seeds of Peace official website
- Rimer, Sara (September 3, 1995). "For 130 Arab and Israeli Teen-Agers, Maine Camp Is Where Peace Begins". The New York Times.
- In Search of Peace On Common Ground New York Times, 29 August 1999
- Mideast teens plant Seeds of Peace CNN.com, 14 August 2001
- Seeds of Peace camp plants seed of hope CNN.com, 19 July 2002
- Arabs, Israelis Hold Peace Reunion Fox News, 16 August 2005
- Peace Camp's Sense of Hope Unshaken Washington Post, 7 August 2006
