= September 1961 Gaza border incident =

1961 massacre of Arabs by Israeli forces

In September 1961, five Arab citizens of Israel were shot and killed by Israeli security forces while attempting to cross the Israel-Gaza border. The deaths provoked several days of rioting inside Israel.

== Events ==
In mid-September 1961, five teenage Arab citizens of Israel were killed by Israel security forces as they attempted to cross the border between Israel and Gaza (then under the United Arab Republic occupation of the Gaza Strip). Three Israeli Arab boys were killed on 17 September and two more on 18 September. According to the Israeli government, the five youth had refused to stop when ordered by border forces.

The deaths provoked several days of rioting by Arab citizens of Israel, including in Nazareth and Acre, particularly after rumours circulated that the five youth had been tortured before being killed. According to Lawrence Fellows of The New York Times, it was "the first serious disturbance between the Arabs and Jews of this country since Israel achieved independence thirteen years ago."

The Mayor of Haifa Abba Hushi played a significant role in helping calm the unrest, and warned that communists were using the incident to incite violence. Several Arab notables also joined in Hushi's efforts. As well, the publication of the post-mortem report compiled by the Abu Kabir Forensic Institute also contributed to the calming of the unrest, with the report stating that the five youth had shot from a distance and that their bodies showed no signs of mutilation. Policing efforts, including the establishment of roadblocks between Arab cities, also contributed to the quieting of the unrest.

Following the quieting of the unrest, Israeli police began tracking down "Nasserite elements" within the towns that had been the centre of the unrest. A number of prominent Communist Party members in Nazareth were arrested on charges of having incited riots, including Tawfiq Ziad and Loutfi Zari. Increased police patrols were also maintained in the towns to prevent a reoccurrence of the unrest.

A small further clash related to the incident would occur in early October, when a student group in Tel Aviv attempted to hand out leaflets calling for an investigation and including photos of the bodies to moviegoers. After some moviegoers clashed with the students, Israeli police arrested the students on charges of circulating illegal material.

== Reactions ==
Minister of Foreign Affairs Golda Meir described the incident as "another regrettable result of the border warfare which is part of the belligerence practiced by the Arab state against Israel," adding that "we challenge any Arab country to match the progress in universal, free, compulsory education, health services, economic welfare, rate of employment, standards of living, status of women–which are enjoyed by our Arab citizens who comprise about 12 percent of our population."

The left-wing Mapam and the far-left Maki parties initially called for a parliamentary inquiry into the shootings. Following reports given to the Israeli cabinet by Chief of Staff Tzvi Tzur and Inspector General of the Police Joseph Nahmias, Mapam withdrew its calls and joined the other parties in the Cabinet in a statement saying that they were "satisfied that the security forces acted in accordance with the law." The statement explained that Arab citizens of Israel were allowed to leave the country legally and that there was no reason for any to try and cross the Gazan border illegally. It further added that a significant increase in UAR intelligence activity had been reported in the previous few months.

Deputy Mayor of Nazareth Abdul Aziz Zubi condemned the rioting that followed the deaths, saying that it "has undone all the good work that has been accomplished since the state was created. Those Jews who had wanted to raise us to the status of equal citizens, and I think they were a majority, will be in a bad position to do anything for us now." Zubi, however, added that there were still underlying resentment among Arab citizens of Israel, including grievances over the independence of Israel, the martial law enforced on them, expropriation of Arab-owned land, and lack of employment opportunities for Arab youth.

== See also ==
- List of massacres in Israel
- October 2000 protests in Israel
