= Line 361 bus attack =

1956 terrorist incident in Israel

- Location: Near Be'er Menucha, Arava, Israel
- Date: 16 August 1956; 11:30–12:00 (UTC+02:00)
- Target: Egged bus No. 361 and IDF escort
- Attack type: Bus ambush, Terrorism
- Deaths: 4
- Injuries: 9
- Perpetrator: Palestinian infiltrators from Jordan

The Line 361 bus attack was a terrorist attack carried out on 16 August 1956, against an Egged bus traveling from Tel Aviv to Eilat, in the Arava region of southern Israel. The attack was perpetrated by a group of Palestinian infiltrators who crossed into Israel from Jordan and ambushed the bus and its accompanying Israel Defense Forces (IDF) escort vehicle. Four Israelis were killed and nine others were injured.

== Background ==
During the 1950s, Israel experienced numerous cross-border infiltrations from neighboring states, particularly from Jordan. Some of these incursions involved attacks on civilian targets, including settlements, roads, and public transportation. The bus route linking Tel Aviv and Eilat passed through long, sparsely populated stretches of the Arava desert and was therefore considered especially vulnerable; as a result, civilian buses on this route were sometimes accompanied by military escort vehicles.

== The attack ==
On 16 August 1956, a group of Palestinian infiltrators entered Israel from Jordan and reached the area near Be'er Menucha in the Arava. The attackers positioned themselves in ambush along the roadside and waited for Egged bus No. 361, which was traveling south toward Eilat and was accompanied by an IDF vehicle.

At approximately 11:30–12:00, the attackers opened fire on the bus and the escort vehicle. During the assault, four Israelis—both civilians and IDF soldiers—were killed. Nine additional passengers and soldiers were wounded. According to some contemporary reports, several of the victims were also injured during close-range physical attacks carried out as the assailants stormed the bus. After a brief exchange of fire, the attackers withdrew and retreated back across the border into Jordanian territory.

== Casualties ==
- Killed: 4 Israelis
- Wounded: 9 Israelis

While Haaretz initially reported five wounded, likely referring only to those seriously injured, both HaTzofe and Al Hamishmar confirmed a total of nine injured.
