= Or Commission =

Israeli government inquiry into the October 2000 events

The Or Commission (Hebrew: ועדת אור), fully the Commission of Inquiry into the Clashes Between Security Forces and Israeli Citizens in October 2000 (ועדת החקירה הממלכתית לבירור ההתנגשויות בין כוחות הביטחון לבין אזרחים ישראלים באוקטובר 2000), was a panel of inquiry appointed by the Israeli government to investigate the events of October 2000 at the beginning of the Second Intifada in which 12 Arab citizens of Israel and one Palestinian were killed by Israeli police amid several demonstrations. One Israeli Jew was killed by a stone dropped from a bridge onto her vehicle near one such demonstration; however, it is not clear that the incident was linked. The commission released its findings on "the clashes between security forces and Israeli civilians" on September 2, 2003. The chief investigator was Theodor Or, an Israeli Supreme Court Justice.

== Main conclusions of the Or Commission ==
=== Police responsibility ===
The governmental body of inquiry criticised the Israeli police for being unprepared for the riots and using excessive force to disperse the protesting and rioting citizens. Eight policemen were reprimanded by the commission, most of them after they had retired from the police force. Two police officers were released from the force due to the conclusions.

=== Official responsibility ===
As the commission's mandate was one of inquiry, no action was taken against most of those warned by it, but rather recommendations were made. Most Jewish politicians were determined to be largely not responsible, with the exception being the Internal Security Ministry, Prof. Shlomo Ben-Ami. The commission recommended that he be removed from his post, and he would later become foreign minister. Also, three Arab figures (two Arab members of the Knesset and the head of the northern branch of the Islamic movement in Israel) were found to be partially responsible by incitement that preceded the riots.

=== Background to the demonstrations ===
The Or Commission found that Arab citizens suffer discrimination in Israel and leveled criticism at the government for failing to give fair and equal attention to the needs of Arab citizens of Israel. The commission found that frustration with discrimination led to the outpourings of frustration in October 2000.

== Reception ==
The commission's report was highly controversial on all sides, both gravely disappointing the families of the victims and angering those who blamed Arab citizens for the unrest of October 2000.

Arab advocacy organizations such as Adalah, the Arab Association for Human Rights, and Mossawa argued that the report exonerated Jewish Israeli political figures who played a central role in mishandling the crisis around October 2000, and gave slap-on-the-wrist treatment to those who fired the shots, while severely censuring Arab political figures for incendiary speech. Some commentators believed this amounted to virtual circumvention of due process for Arab citizens.

At the same time, the Or Commission's statements were perhaps the first public official acknowledgment of discrimination faced by the Arab citizenry of Israel; Adalah and Mossawa commended the Or Commission for this admission. One year after the release of the commission report, Theodore Or publicly attacked the government for failing to implement its recommendations.

James Taranto of The Wall Street Journal commented "That the Israeli government criticizes its own treatment of Arabs is a testament to its democracy."

== See also ==
- October 2000 events
