= Zavdiel =

Zavdiel: זבדיאל (Hebrew); زفديئيل (Arabic)
- Location within Ashkelon region of Israel
- Coordinates: 31°39′31″N 34°45′37″E
- Country: Israel
- District: Southern
- Subdistrict: Ashkelon
- Council: Shafir
- Affiliation: Poalei Agudat Yisrael
- Founded: 1950
- Founder: Yemenite immigrants
- Population (2024): 850

Zavdiel (Hebrew: זַבְדִּיאֵל, lit. Gift of God) is a religious moshav in southern Israel. Located in Hevel Lakhish near Kiryat Gat, it falls under the jurisdiction of Shafir Regional Council. In 2006, it had a population of 413.

== History ==
The village was established in 1950 by immigrants from Yemen, on the lands of the depopulated Palestinian village of Hatta. Its name was taken from Nehemiah 11:14, and is the name of a priest returning from Babel.
