= Ein Ofarim killings =

1956 attack on Israeli Druze civilians by Palestinian fedayeen

- Part of Palestinian Fedayeen insurgency
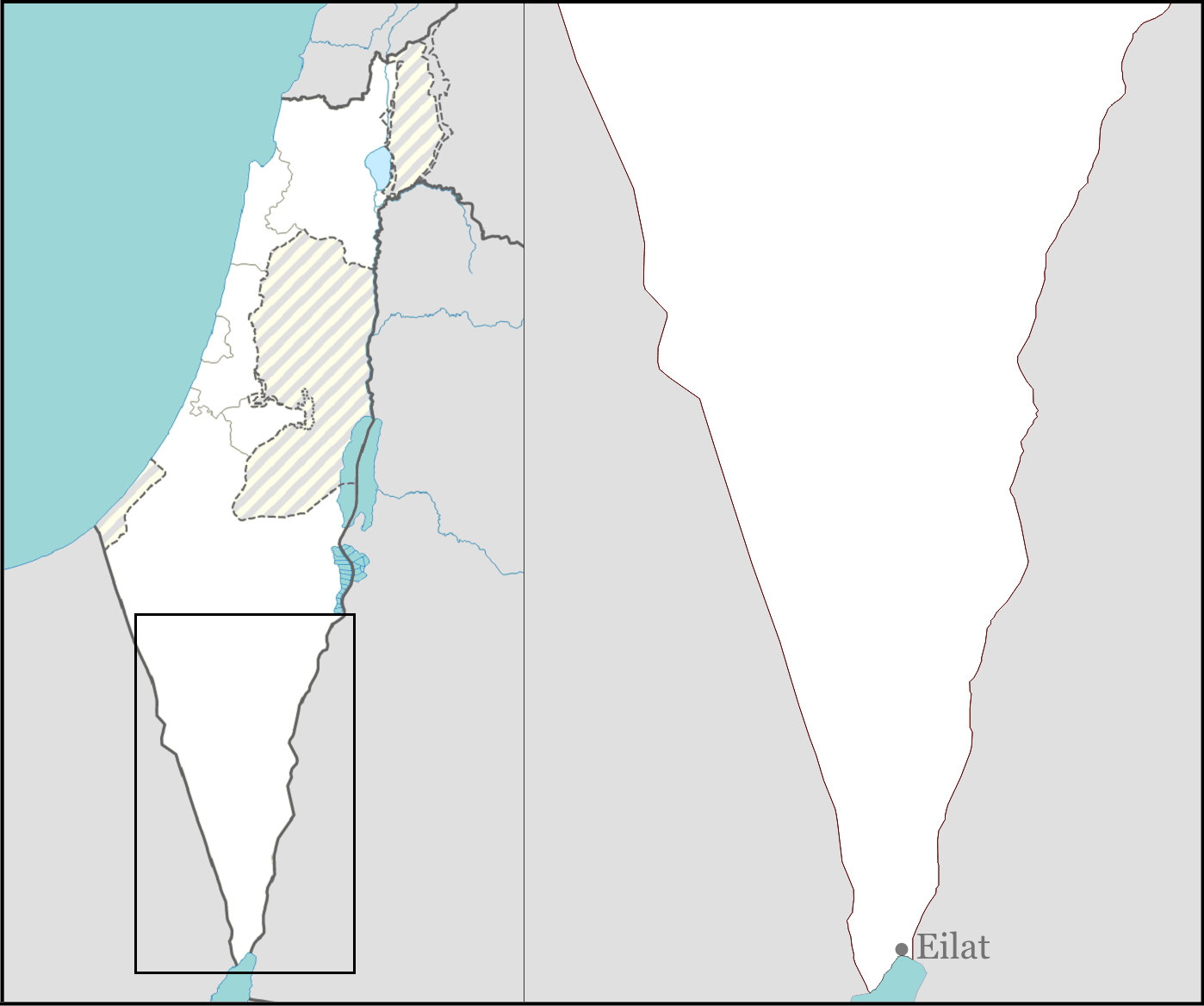
- The location of Hatzeva, Israel
- Native name: הפיגוע בעין עופרים
- Location: Ein Ofarim facility near Hatzeva, Southern Israel
- Date: 12 September 1956; 70 years ago
- Attack type: Stabbing attack
- Weapon: Knives
- Deaths: 3 Israelis
- Perpetrator: Palestinian Fedayeen squad

The Ein Ofarim killings was an attack by Palestinian Fedayeen, which occurred on Wednesday night, 12 September 1956.

== The attack ==
On Wednesday night, 12 September 1956, a Palestinian Fedayeen squad infiltrated into Israel from Jordan. The militants attacked the Ein Ofarim oil-drilling camp near the village Hatzeva, while other personnel were out of the camp for grocery shopping. They killed 3 Druze watchmen, one in his room. The bodies of the guards were stabbed and their guns were stolen by the attackers.

== Victims ==
The three victims, Nawaf Abu-Ghazi (25 years), Suleiman Hatoum (25 years) and Rafik Abdullah (23 years), were buried in their hometown of Sumei. They were commemorated on Mount Herzl.

== Aftermath ==
With consulting his Cabinet, the Israeli Prime Minister decided on a reprisal raid. Since the nearest Jordanian police fort was 'topologically difficult', the police fort 80 kilometers away at Gharandal was chosen. During the operation, either 9 or 13 Jordanian police and members of a desert camel patrol unit were killed, along with two civilians. IDF casualties in the operation included one dead soldier and 12 wounded soldiers. The police station and nearby structures were destroyed.
