= 1956 Sderot mining attack =

1956 terrorist incident in Israel

The 1956 Sderot mining attack was a Palestinian terror attack carried out by Fedayeen insurgents on November 5, 1956. The incident resulted in the deaths of five young men after their horse-drawn cart struck a landmine planted near Sderot, a developing town in southern Israel.

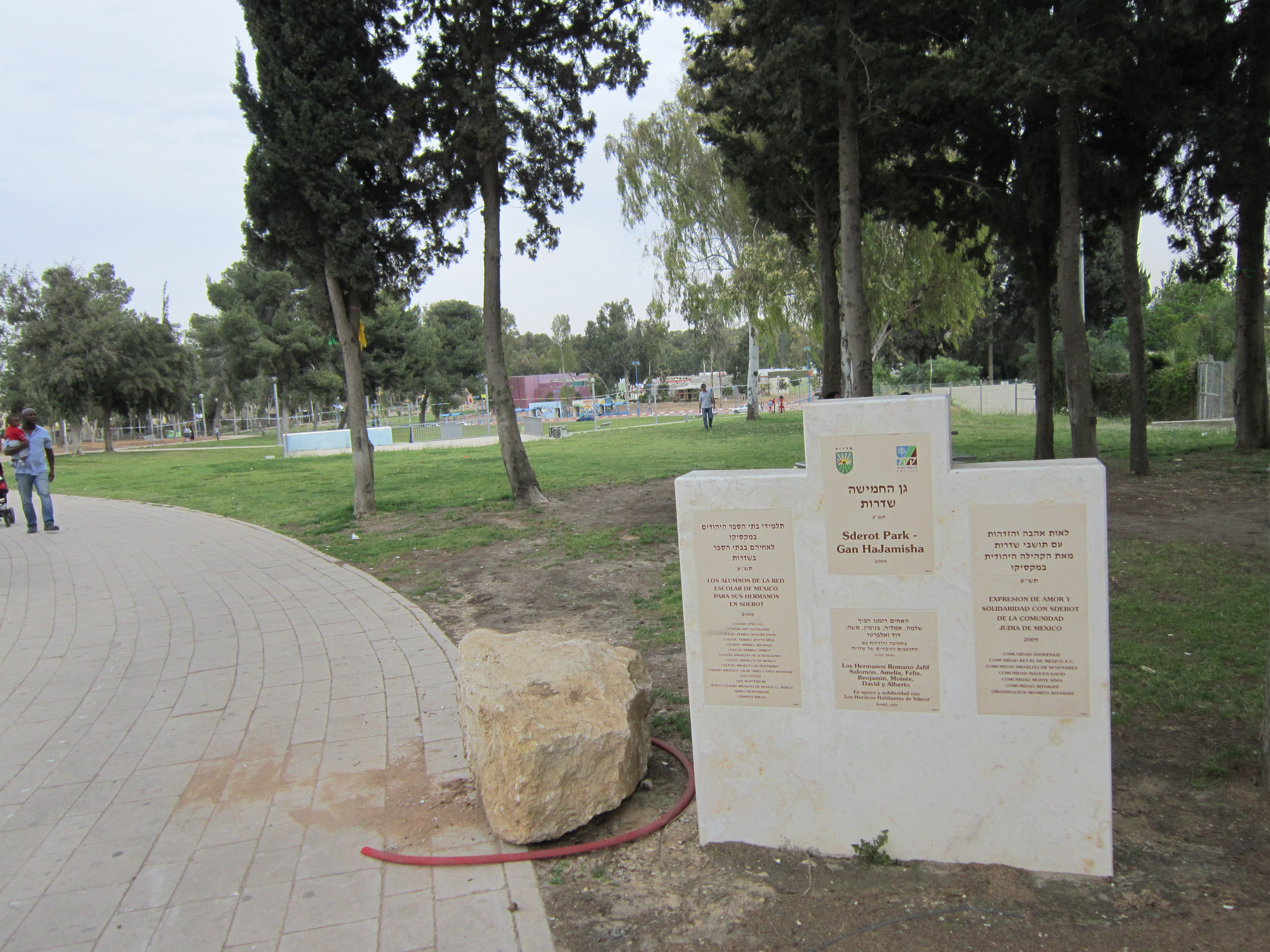
Sderot, "Garden of Five" in memory of five people in the town who were killed in a terrorist attack

== Background ==
The attack occurred during the final stages of the Sinai War. During this period, Fedayeen units—militants operating from the Egyptian-controlled Gaza Strip—frequently infiltrated Israeli territory to carry out sabotage and attacks against civilian and military targets.

== Incident ==
On the morning of November 5, 1956, five young laborers set out from Sderot in a horse-drawn wagon. Four were residents of Sderot, and the fifth was from the nearby Kibbutz Bror Hayil. They were traveling to work at a citrus grove in the Ibim farm vicinity.

As the wagon traversed a dirt path approximately 200 metres (660 ft) from the grove, it triggered a land mine. Investigations later suggested the mine had been planted by infiltrators from the Gaza Strip between one and three days prior. The explosion destroyed the cart instantly, killing all five men. Reports regarding the horse vary: Some accounts state the animal was killed in the blast, but local lore suggests the horse survived and returned to Sderot alone, alerting the townspeople that a tragedy had occurred.

The victims were all young men from immigrant families, aged between 17 and 25. For the nascent community of Sderot, which was still in its earliest years of development, the loss of four local youths was a devastating blow. The four Sderot residents were buried side by side in the local cemetery, while the fifth victim was interred at Kibbutz Bror Hayil.

== Commemoration ==
In memory of the five victims, the town of Sderot established "Gan HaHamisha" (The Garden of the Five). The attack remains a significant event in the town's early history, marking the ongoing security challenges faced by border communities during that era.
