= Al-Aqsa is in danger =

Islamic political slogan

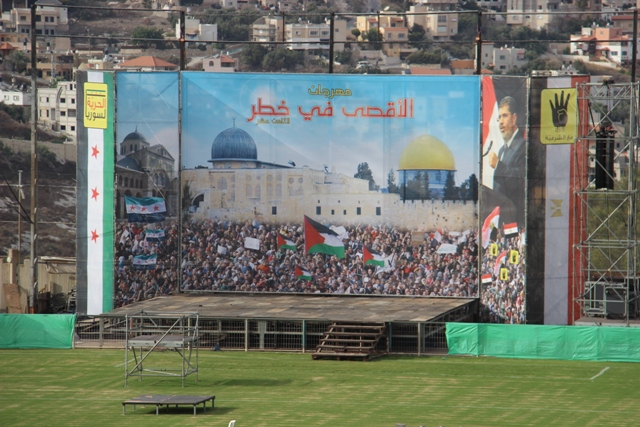
Al-Aqsa in Danger Festival in Umm al-Fahm, Israel, 2013.

"Al-Aqsa is in danger" (Arabic: الأقصى في خطر, romanized: al-Aqṣá fī khaṭar) is an Islamic political slogan that has been used in the context of the Arab–Israeli conflict, referring to the Al-Aqsa mosque compound, a site also known as the Temple Mount. The slogan is a rallying call for Muslims to oppose the presence of Jews and Israelis at the compound under the pretext that they are seeking to take it over for the construction of the Third Temple. It also opposes archaeological investigations at the site, which are perceived as undermining the structural foundations of the area; many biblical excavations, particularly by Christian organizations, have sought to unearth more evidence of the Temple in Jerusalem and the true site of Jesus' crucifixion, among others. In mainstream Orthodox Judaism the rebuilding of the Temple is generally left to the coming of the Jewish Messiah and to divine providence.

It was most notably used between 1996 and 2015 for the annual "Al-Aqsa in Danger Festival" that was held by the Palestinian Muslim religious leader Raed Salah and his Islamic Movement in Israel, considered the most well-attended Islamic festival in Israel.

It has been described by pro-Israeli commentators as a "dangerous lie" that has been used by Arabs to fan the flames of violent anti-Jewish uprisings, such as the 1929 Palestine riots, the Al-Aqsa intifada, the 2009 Al-Aqsa clashes, the 2022 Al-Aqsa clashes, and the 2023 Al-Aqsa clashes.

In mainstream Orthodox Judaism the rebuilding of the Temple is generally left to the coming of the Jewish Messiah and to divine providence. A few organizations, representing a small minority of Orthodox Jews, want to realize construction of a Third Temple in present times. The Temple Institute, the self-proclaimed "Temple Mount Administration" and the Temple Mount and Eretz Yisrael Faithful Movement each state that its goal is to build the Third Temple on the Temple Mount (Mount Moriah).

== See also ==
- Temple Institute
- Red heifer
- Temple denial
- Far-right Israeli politicians at Al-Aqsa
