= Kafr Qasim massacre =

1956 Israeli massacre of Arab civilians

Coordinates: 32°6′51″N 34°58′17″E

- Part of the Suez Crisis
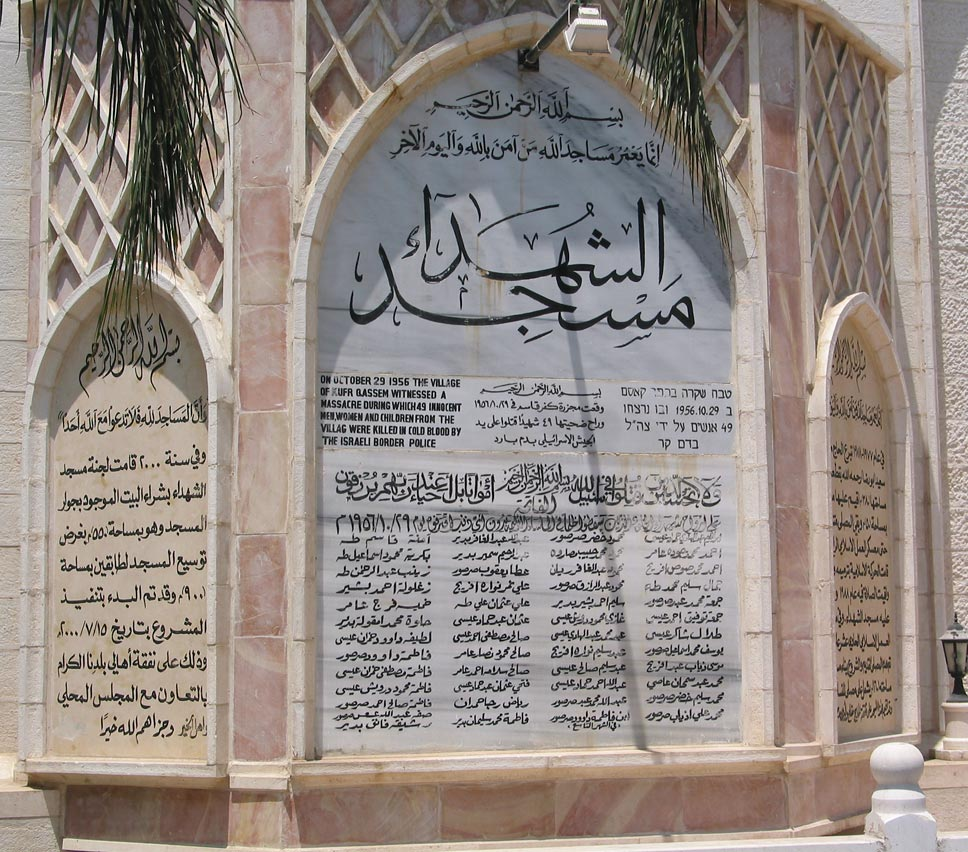
- Memorial for the massacre at Kafr Qasim

- Kafr Qasim massacre (Israel)
- Location: Kafr Qasim, Israel
- Date: 29 October 1956; 70 years ago
- Target: Arab villagers
- Attack type: Massacre
- Deaths: 49 (including an unborn child)
- Perpetrator: Israel Border Police

The Israel Border Police massacred 48 Palestinian civilians, including 19 men, 6 women and 23 children, in the Israeli Arab village of Kafr Qasim on 29 October 1956, the eve of the Sinai War. Israeli forces had imposed a curfew on the village in the morning of 29 October, and when a number of villagers who had been away and were unaware of the curfew returned, they were massacred.

From 1949 to 1966, Arab citizens were regarded by Israel as a hostile population. On 29 October 1956, the Israeli army ordered that all Arab villages near the Green Line, at that time, the de facto border between Israel and the Jordanian West Bank, to be placed under a wartime curfew. The border policemen who were involved in the shooting were brought to trial and found guilty and sentenced to prison terms ranging from 7 to 17 years. The brigade commander was sentenced to pay the symbolic fine of 10 prutot (old Israeli cents).

The Israeli court found that the command to kill civilians was "blatantly illegal". However, all of the sentences were later reduced, with some of those convicted receiving presidential pardons. All of those convicted had been released by November 1959. Two of those convicted later received promotions: Shmuel Malinksi was put in charge of the Negev Nuclear Research Center, while Gabriel Dahan was placed in charge of "Arab Affairs" of the city of Ramla.

Issachar (Yissachar) "Yiska" Shadmi—the highest-ranking official prosecuted for the massacre—stated, shortly before his death, that he believed that his trial was staged to protect members of the Israeli political and military elite, including Prime Minister David Ben Gurion, from taking responsibility for the massacre. The purpose was to portray the perpetrators as a group of rogue soldiers, rather than people acting under higher orders.

In December 2007, President of Israel Shimon Peres formally apologised for the massacre. In October 2021, a Joint List bill to have the massacre officially recognized was rejected in the Knesset.

== Background ==
On the first day of the Suez War, Israel's intelligence service expected Jordan to enter the war on Egypt's side. Acting on this intelligence, soldiers were stationed along the Israeli-Jordanian frontier. The town of Kafr Qasim was about 1 km west of the Green Line.

From 1949 to 1966, Arab citizens were regarded by Israel as a hostile population, and major Arab population centers were governed by military administrations divided into several districts. As such, several battalions of the Israel Border Police, under the command of Israel Defense Forces brigade commander Colonel Yissachar Shadmi, were ordered to prepare the defense of a section close to the border officially known as the Central District, and colloquially as the Triangle.

== Massacre ==
On October 29, 1956, the Israeli army ordered that all Arab villages near the Jordanian border be placed under a wartime curfew from 5 p.m. to 6 a.m. on the following day. Any Arab on the streets was to be shot. The order was given to border police units before most of the Arabs from the villages could be notified. Many of them were at work at the time. That morning, Shadmi, who was in charge of the Triangle, received orders to take all precautionary measures to ensure quiet on the Jordanian border. On Shadmi's initiative, the official nightly curfew in the twelve villages under his jurisdiction was changed from the regular hours. Shadmi then gathered all the border patrol battalion commanders under his command, and reportedly ordered them to 'shoot on sight' any villagers violating the curfew. Once the order was given, the commander of one of Shadmi's battalions, Major Shmuel Malinki, who was in charge of the Border Guard unit at the village of Kafr Qasim, asked Shadmi on how to react to those villagers who were unaware of the curfew.

Malinki later testified as follows:

'[Shadmi said] anyone who left his house would be shot. It would be best if on the first night there were 'a few like that' and on the following nights they would be more careful. I asked: in the light of that, I can understand that a guerilla is to be killed but what about the fate of the Arab civilians? And they may come back to the village in the evening from the valley, from settlements or from the fields, and won't know about the curfew in the village – I suppose I am to have sentries at the approaches to the village? To this Col. Issachar replied in crystal clear words, 'I don't want sentimentality and I don't want arrests, there will be no arrests'. I said: 'Even though?'. To that he answered me in Arabic, Allah Yarḥamu, which I understood as equivalent to the Hebrew phrase, 'Blessed be the true judge' [said on receiving news of a person's death]'.

Shadmi, however, denied that the matter of the returnees ever came up in his conversation with Malinki.

Malinki issued a similar order to the reserve forces attached to his battalion, shortly before the curfew was enforced: "No inhabitants shall be allowed to leave his home during the curfew. Anyone leaving his home shall be shot; there shall be no arrests." (ibid., p. 141)

The new curfew regulations were imposed in the absence of the laborers, who were at work and unaware of the new rules. At 4.30 p.m., the mukhtar (mayor) of Kafr Qasim was informed of the new time. He asked what would happen to the about 400 villagers working outside the village in the fields that were not aware of the new time. An officer assured him that they would be taken care of. When word of the curfew change was sent, most returned immediately, but others did not.

Between 5 p.m. and 6:30 p.m., in nine separate shooting incidents, the platoon led by Lt. Gabriel Dahan that was stationed in Kafr Qasim all together killed nineteen men, six women, ten teenage boys (age 14–17), six girls (age 12–15), and seven young boys (age 8–13), who did not make it home before curfew. One survivor, Jamal Farij, recalls arriving at the entrance to the village in a truck with 28 passengers:

'We talked to them. We asked if they wanted our identity cards. They didn't. Suddenly one of them said, 'Cut them down' – and they opened fire on us like a flood.'

One Israeli soldier, Shalom Ofer, later admitted: 'We acted like Germans, automatically, we didn't think', but never expressed remorse or regret for his actions.

The many injured were left unattended, and could not be succoured by their families because of the 24-hour curfew. The dead were collected and buried in a mass grave by Arabs, taken for that purpose, from the nearby village of Jaljuliya. When the curfew ended, the wounded were picked up from the streets and trucked to hospitals.

No villagers in other villages under Shadmi's control were shot, because local commanders gave direct orders to disobey Shadmi's and Malinki's orders by holding fire. For example, Yehuda Frankental who, on his own initiative, refused Shadmi's orders. Jaim Levi, however, did not directly refuse orders but allowed his platoon commanders to exercise their own moral judgement.

== Subsequent events ==
The military censor imposed a total ban on newspaper reportage on the massacre. Nonetheless, news of the incident leaked out after communist Knesset Members Tawfik Toubi and Meir Vilner managed to enter the village two weeks later and investigate the rumours. However, it took two months of lobbying by them and the press before the government lifted the media blackout imposed by David Ben-Gurion. The government started an internal inquiry on November 1 involving, among others, the Criminal Investigations Division of the military police. To limit publicity, a military cordon was maintained around the village for months, preventing journalists from approaching. David Ben-Gurion made his first public reference to the incident on November 12.

=== Trial ===
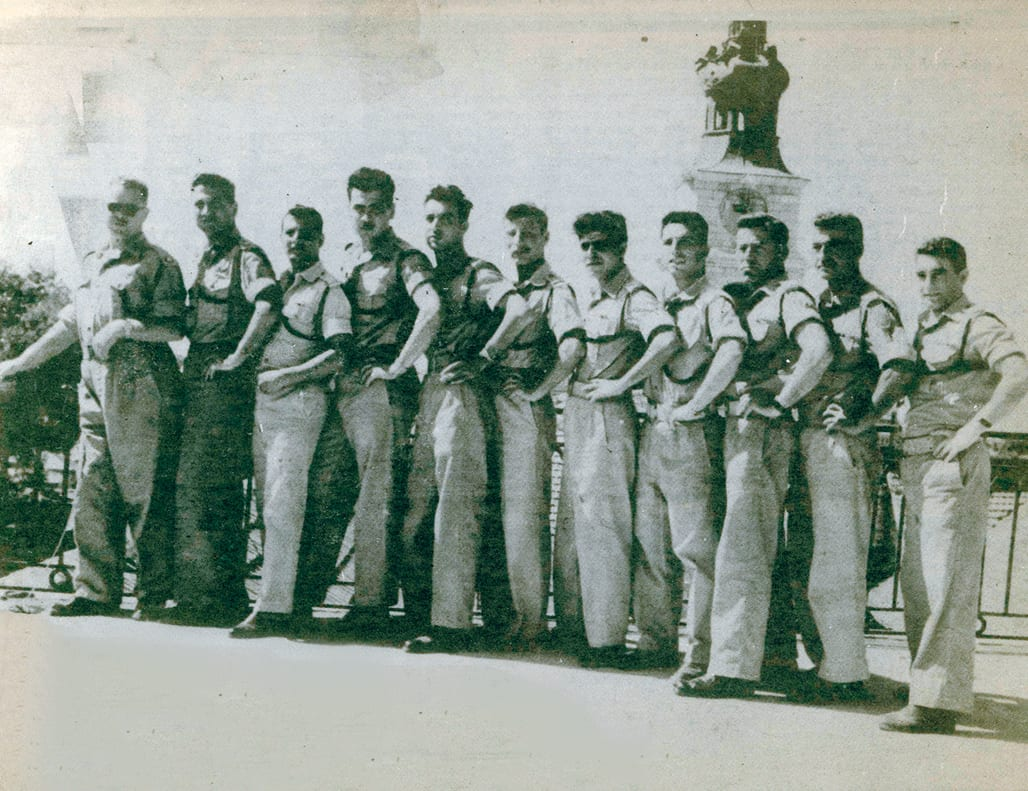
The eleven Israeli soldiers accused of perpetrating the massacre. Battalion commander Shmuel Melinki on the left.

Following public protests, eleven Border Police officers and soldiers involved in the massacre were court-martialed for murder. The trial was presided over by Judge Benjamin Halevy. On October 16, 1958, eight of them were found guilty and sentenced to prison terms ranging from seven to 17 years. Malinki received the longest sentence of 17 years, while Dahan was sentenced to 15 years imprisonment. The court placed great emphasis on the fundamental responsibility of Shadmi, though the latter was not a defendant. Shadmi was subsequently charged as well, but his separate court hearing (February 29, 1959) found him innocent of murder and only guilty of extending the curfew without authority. His symbolic punishment, a fine of 10 prutot, i.e. a grush (one Israeli cent), became a standard metaphor in Israeli polemic debate. The fact that other local commanders realised they had to disobey Shadmi's order was cited by the court as one of the reasons for denying Dahan's claim that he had no choice. None of the officers served out the terms of their sentences.

The court of appeal (April 3, 1959) reduced Malinki's sentence to 14 years and Dahan's to 10. The Chief of Staff further reduced them to 10 and 8 years, then the Israeli President Yitzhak Ben-Zvi pardoned many and reduced some sentences to 5 years each. Finally, the Committee for the Release of Prisoners ordered the remission of one third of the prison sentences, resulting in all the convicted persons being out of prison by November 1959. Soon after his release, Malinki was promoted and put in charge of security for the top secret Negev Nuclear Research Center. In 1960, Dahan was placed in charge of "Arab Affairs" by the city of Ramla.

In 2017, historian Adam Raz appealed to the military appellate tribunal for release of documents relating to the massacre, including the trial minutes. In 2021, the tribunal refused the request and imposed a gag order on the entire case, even including the fact that a ruling had been made. One year later, it became legal to note the existence of a ruling, but not its content. Former state archivist Yaacov Lozowick, who is familiar with the material sought by Raz, told Haaretz that "the degree of imbecility of this decision is so great, that no further comment is needed." In May 2022, following the negative publicity, the court permitted publication of the ruling and many, but not all, of the primary documents related to the massacre.

==== Operation Hafarperet ====
Approximately 1/3 of the court hearings were held in secret, and the transcript was not published until July 2022. According to journalists Tzvi Joffre and Ruvik Rosenthal, the court received descriptions of a secret plan called Operation Hafarperet ("mole") to expel Israeli Arabs of the Little Triangle in case of a war with Jordan, apparently planned by Avraham Tamir by request of Ben-Gurion. A similar opinion is held by historian Adam Raz, who described the massacre as pre-planned and part of an Operation which would result in the expulsion of the Arab Israelis from the region. Shadmi described his trial as staged so as to "keep Israel’s security and political elite – including Prime Minister Ben-Gurion, IDF Chief of Staff Moshe Dayan, and GOC Central Command (and later chief of staff) Tzvi Tzur – from having to take responsibility for the massacre."

The trial transcript, released for publication in 2022, reveals that company commanders were briefed before the start of hostilities that there was an official plan to push the inhabitants of Kafr Qasim across the Green Line to the Jordanian-occupied village of Tira. For this purpose, checkpoints were not placed on the eastern side of Kafr Qasim.

==== Impact of the court case ====
The Kafr Qasim trial considered for the first time the issue of when Israeli security personnel are required to disobey illegal orders. The judges decided that soldiers do not have the obligation to examine each and every order in detail as to its legality, nor were they entitled to disobey orders merely on a subjective feeling that they might be illegal. On the other hand, some orders were manifestly illegal, and these must be disobeyed. Judge Benjamin Halevy's words, still much-quoted today, were that

The hallmark of manifest illegality is that it must wave like a black flag over the given order, a warning that says: "forbidden!" Not formal illegality, obscure or partially obscure, not illegality that can be discerned only by legal scholars, is important here, but rather, the clear and obvious violation of law .... Illegality that pierces the eye and revolts the heart, if the eye is not blind and the heart is not impenetrable or corrupt—this is the measure of manifest illegality needed to override the soldier's duty to obey and to impose on him criminal liability for his action.

The incident was partly responsible for gradual changes in Israel's policy toward Arab citizens of Israel. By 1966, the military administration was abolished.

== Commemoration ==
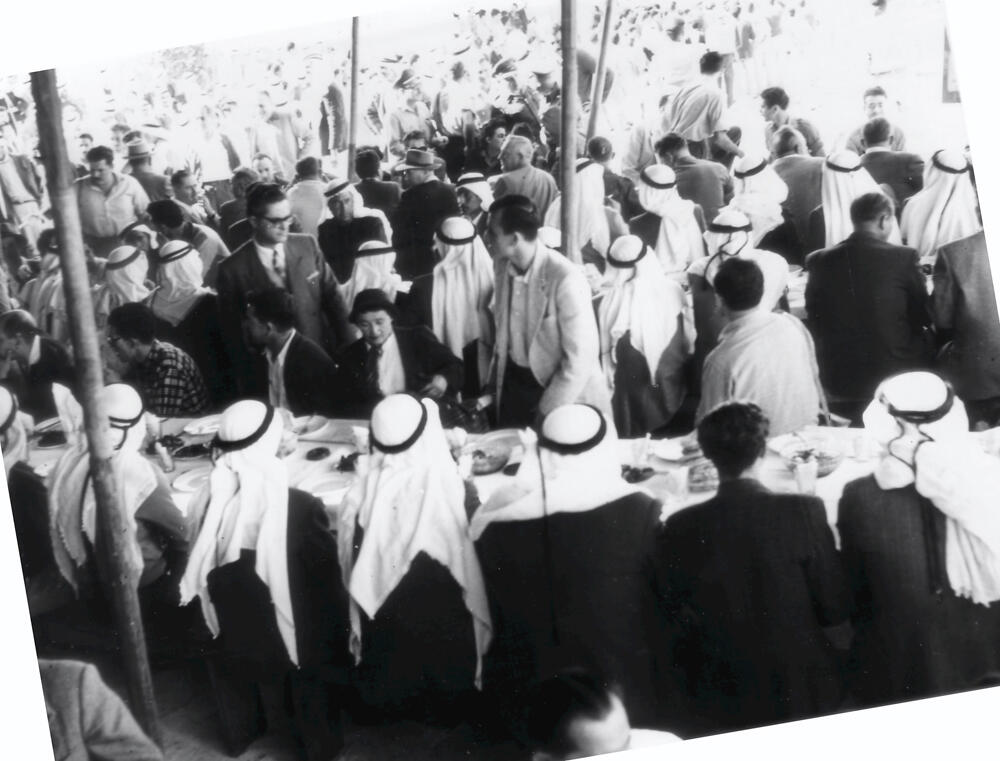
Sulha' meal, November 1957

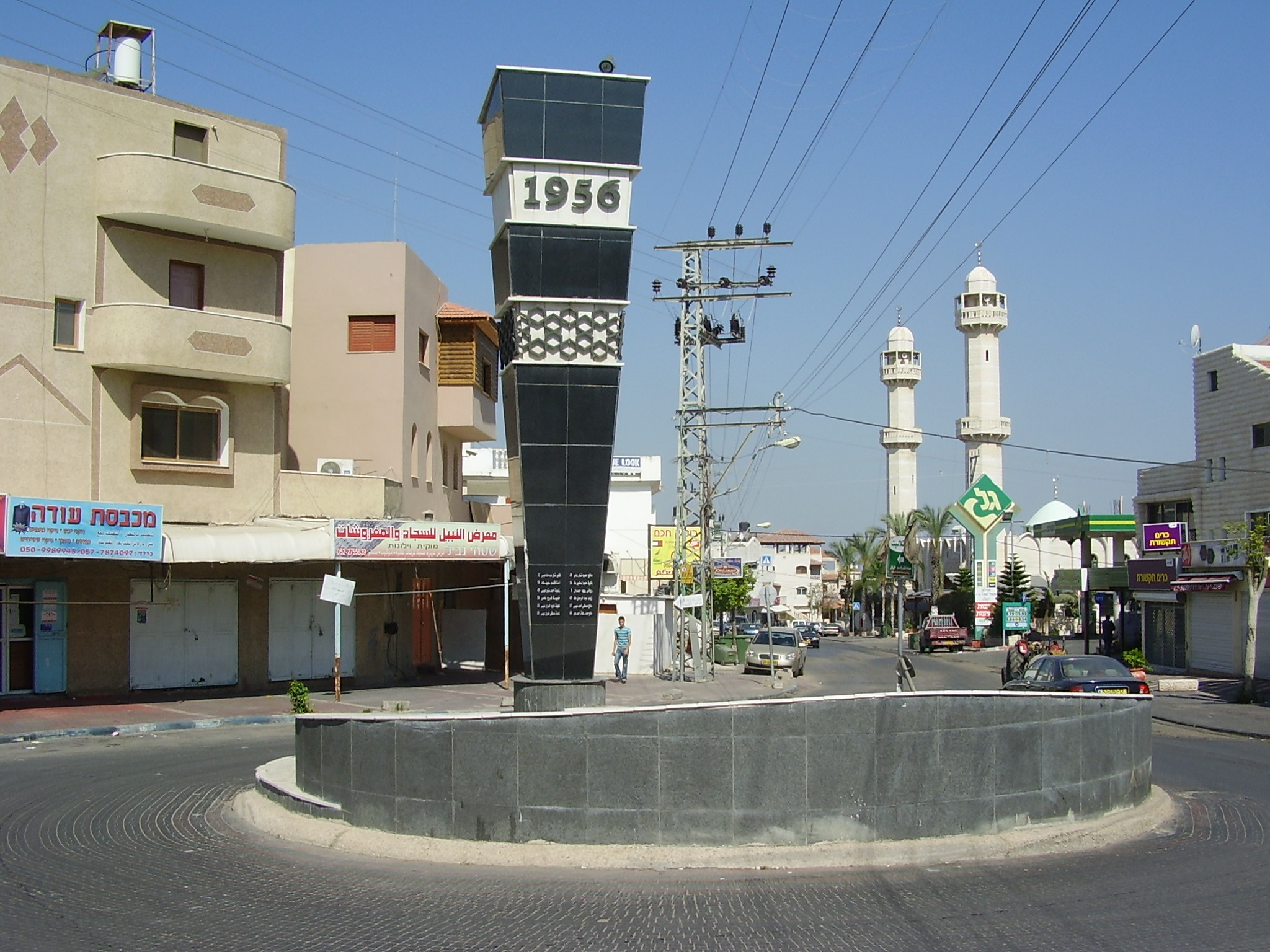
Kafr Qasim memorial

As recently as 2021, attempts to have the massacre officially recognized in Israel have failed. A bill presented by the Joint List to achieve that end was overwhelming defeated in a Knesset vote on 26 October 2021, with a 93/12 voting majority. The proposed bill, which was opposed by Kfar Qasim resident and Regional Cooperation Minister Esawi Freije, also included provisions to incorporate information on the incident in school syllabuses and for the declassification of all archival documents related to it. On November 20, 1957, 400 distinguished guests and representatives from different sectors of Israeli society, including Knesset members, cabinet ministers, members from the then ruling Mapai party, national trade union officials, and notable members from neighboring Arab villages, held a reconciliation ceremony in memory of the victims at Kafr Qasim. The ceremony was designed as a "sulha", explicitly referring to a Bedouin clan-based conflict resolution custom. The government subsequently distributed reparations to the family of the victims. At that time, the mainstream press (such as JTA or Histadrut owned Davar) gives a favorable account of the ceremony, unlike the Arabic-language press (such as al-Ittihad and al-Mirsad, sponsored by MAPAM and MAKI parties) who denounced it as a fraud.

In a 2006 academic article focusing on the massacre's commemoration, Shira Robinson considers the sulha as a "charade" which villagers were highly pressured to participate in, designed to position the conflict "within a contrived history of symmetrical violence between Arabs and Jews," staged by the government for the purpose of escaping its responsibilities and lightening the weight of the court's verdict, making the ceremony itself "part of the crime that Palestinians commemorate today." In a 2008 academic article, Professor Susan Slyomovics corroborates this perspective on a ceremony "forced upon the villagers." In this paper, Slyomovics notably relies upon Ibrahim Sarsur's testimony, which concluded: "Until today in Kafr Qasim, there is no one who agrees with the manner of treatment of the government of Israel concerning the massacre and its consequences."

In October 2006, Yuli Tamir, the education minister in Israel, ordered schools around the country to observe the Kafr Qasim massacre and to reflect upon the need to disobey illegal orders. In December 2007, President of Israel Shimon Peres apologised for the massacre. During a reception in the village for the Muslim festival of Eid al-Adha, Peres said that he came to Kafr Qasem to ask the villagers for forgiveness. "A terrible event happened here in the past, and we are very sorry for it," he said. The founder of the Islamic Movement in Israel, Sheikh Abdullah Nimr Darwish, also spoke at the ceremony and called on religious leaders on both sides to build bridges between the Israelis and the Palestinians.

The townspeople of Kafr Qasim annually observe the massacre and several memorial monuments have been raised since 1976. According to Tamir Sorek, the Israeli government financially supported the first monument in 1976 in order to ensure sanitized non-political language. Therefore, the inscription on the first monument describes the massacre merely as a “painful tragedy” without mentioning who was responsible for it. Later expressions of spatial commemoration have been much more explicit about this aspect. A museum dealing with the events was opened on October 29, 2006.

On 26 October 2014 Reuven Rivlin, keeping an electoral promise, became the first sitting President of Israel to attend the annual commemorations for the fallen at Kfar Qasim. He called it an 'atrocious massacre', 'a terrible crime' that weighed heavily on the collective conscience of the State of Israel.

== See also ==
- Kafr kasem (1975 Syrian drama film)
- List of massacres in Israel
- Killings and massacres during the 1948 Palestine War
- Israeli war crimes
- Qibya massacre
- Sabra and Shatila massacre
- Khan Yunis massacre
- Rafah massacre

== Bibliography ==
- Shira Robinson, Local struggle, national struggle: Palestinian responses to the Kafr Qasim massacre and its aftermath, 1956–66, International Journal of Middle East Studies, vol 35 (2003), 393–416.
- Robinson, Shira (2006). "Chapter 4: Commemorations under Fire: Palestinian Responses to the 1956 Kafr Qasim Massacre". In Ussama Makdisi, Paul Silverstein (ed.). Memory and violence in the Middle East and North Africa. Indiana University Press. pp. 103–132. ISBN 0-253-21798-9.
- Slyomovics, Susan; Khleif, Waleed (2008). "Chapter 8: Palestinian Remembrance Days and Plans. Kafr Qasim, Fact and Echo". In Sandy Isenstadt, Kishwar Rizvi (ed.). Modernism and the Middle East: architecture and politics in the twentieth century. University of Washington Press. pp. 186–220. ISBN 978-0-295-98794-1.
- Tom Segev, The Seventh Million, Owl Books, 2000, ISBN 0-8050-6660-8, pp. 298–302.
- Leora Y. Bilsky, Transformative Justice: Israeli Identity on Trial (Law, Meaning, and Violence), University of Michigan Press, 2004, ISBN 0-472-03037-X, pp. 169–197, 310–324.
- Sabri Jiryis, The Arabs in Israel, Monthly Review Press, 1977, ISBN 0-85345-406-X.
- M. R. Lippman, Humanitarian Law: The Development and Scope of the Superior Orders Defense, Penn State International Law Review, Fall 2001.
- Israel Military Court of Appeal, judgment (translated), Palestine Yearbook of International Law, Vol II, 1985, 69–118.
