= Mansour Abbas =

Israeli Arab politician (born 1974)

- Abbas in 2026

Ministerial roles
- 2021–2022: Minister without portfolio

Faction represented in the Knesset
- 2019: Ra'am
- 2019–2021: Joint List
- 2021–: Ra'am

Personal details
- Born: 22 April 1974 (age 52) Maghar, Israel

Mansour Abbas (Arabic: منصور عباس; Hebrew: מַנְסוּר עַבַּאס; born 22 April 1974) is an Israeli dentist and politician. He is currently the leader of Ra'am and a Knesset Member on the party's behalf. He was appointed as the chair of Special Committee on Arab Society Affairs in the Knesset on 27 April 2021 and served as deputy Chairman of the Knesset. In 2021, Abbas became the first Israeli of Arab-Muslim origin to join an Israeli governing coalition as minister.

== Early life and education ==
Abbas was born in the town of Maghar in the Northern District of Israel, to an Arab Israeli Muslim family. His parents were farmers, and he has 10 siblings. He began delivering sermons at the Peace Mosque in Maghar at the age of 17. He defines himself as an Arab, a Palestinian, a Muslim, and a citizen of the State of Israel.

He attended the Hebrew University of Jerusalem to study dentistry. Abbas qualified as a dentist, though as of October 2023 his license to practice has lapsed. While at the Hebrew university, he served as chair of the Arab Students Committee between 1997 and 1998. During his tenure he focused his public activities on civil and local issues such as lack of student dormitories, and did not deal with national or political issues. Sheik Abdullah Nimer Darwish, who preached for non-violence and dialogue, was a significant influence on his Mansour's views and beliefs. He studied for his master's degree in political science at the University of Haifa.

== Political career ==
In 2007, Abbas became Secretary General of Ra'am, and in 2010 he was elected Deputy Chairman of the Southern Branch of the Islamic Movement.

In 2013, as deputy chairman of the Southern Branch of the Islamic Movement, he visited several families of prisoners together with the Ra'am leadership on Palestinian Prisoners' Day. Between 2014 and 2016, he met with Hamas figures, among them Khaled Mashal, as part of a peace initiative led by Michael Melchior.

In 2018, he ran for and was elected chairman of Ra'am and its candidate for the Knesset. Among other things, he led the promotion of a new charter for the Islamic Movement, grounding it in wasati Islam, a stream considered moderate. He also added Arab-Muslim women to his Knesset list.

In 2018, he received the "Person of the Year for Reconciliation and Conflict Resolution in Arab Society" award from Radio A-Shams.

== Knesset career ==
=== 2019–2021 ===
In the April 2019 Knesset election, Abbas was nominated by Ra'am and Balad to lead their joint party in the election. He was subsequently elected to the Knesset as the alliance won four seats. Abbas attracted controversy when he spoke in support of conversion therapy to LGBTQ+ youth in an interview with Walla News, leading to his condemnation by other Joint List politicians.

Further divisiveness was caused by Abbas's apparent attempt to improve ties with Israeli prime minister Benjamin Netanyahu and his right-wing Likud party. He gave an interview with the right-wing pro-Netanyahu Channel 20 Network, where he advocated working with Zionist parties in order to secure the funds and reforms needed for the benefit of the Arab Israeli society.

On 21 April 2020, Abbas delivered a historic speech on the Holocaust in the Knesset in which he spoke of the suffering of the Jewish people at the hands of the Nazis. Abbas stated: "As a religious Palestinian Muslim Arab, who was raised on the legacy of Sheikh Abdullah Nimr Darwish who founded the Islamic Movement, I have empathy for the pain and suffering over the years of Holocaust survivors and the families of the murdered." He added, "I stand here to show solidarity with the Jewish people here and forever."

Abbas joined the rest of the Joint List in voting against the Abraham Accords. He described his vote as a protest against the lack of a peace treaty with the Palestinians, adding, "If there will be a real agreement with the Palestinians, there will be real agreements with 55 Muslim countries. But what truly matters is that we are Israelis, and our actions are not supposed to be influenced by whether there is peace with Bahrain."

=== 2021–2022 ===
In January 2021, in the buildup to the 2021 elections, Ra'am split from the Joint List. Analysts attributed the split to a larger, more fundamental disagreement about whether to engage fully with Israeli politics as a means to improve quality of life for Arab Israeli citizens, which Abbas advocates, or to reject full engagement with domestic Israeli politics in order to focus on the larger Israeli-Palestinian conflict. Abbas attributed this position to the influence of his mentor, Sheikh Abdullah, and described Abdullah's funeral as a philosophical turning point for him.

During the 2021 Israeli-Palestinian crisis, Abbas condemned the burning of several synagogues in Lod by rioters, appealing to Muslim values and respect for the rule of law and vowing to help rebuild them. His actions earned him both praise from Jewish leaders and politicians, and anger from Muslim leaders, including calls to resign.

According to the by-laws of the party, limiting MKs to three terms, Abbas was ineligible to run again for office in the 2021 elections. Abbas stated "I have to respect the institutions of Ra'am, if the bylaws are not changed, even though they didn't anticipate four elections in two years when they made the rules." However, he ran in the election as party leader and Ra'am won four seats.

==== Coalition government ====
On 2 June 2021, after holding negotiations with Israeli opposition figures Yair Lapid and Naftali Bennett, Abbas renewed his commitment to backing a non-Netanyahu government after signing a coalition agreement with Lapid, thereby forming the thirty-sixth government of Israel. A photograph of Abbas signing the agreement, which made Ra'am the first independent Arab party to be part of a governing coalition, was widely circulated; after signing it, Bennett praised Abbas as a "courageous" leader. The agreement included pledges to spend approximately US$16 billion to improve infrastructure and reduce crime in Arab towns, to protect homes built without permits in Arab villages, and to recognize four Bedouin towns in the Negev desert.

On 28 October 2021 the Israeli cabinet approved a plan to spend US$9.4 billion to improve employment opportunities and health services for Israeli Arabs and improve housing, technology, and infrastructure in Arab areas; it included a further US$1 billion to address high crime rates in Arab areas. Abbas was widely credited with accomplishing an "historic step" forward for Arab Israelis in securing this unprecedented amount of funding. The plan was signed into law when the budget passed on 4 November 2021.

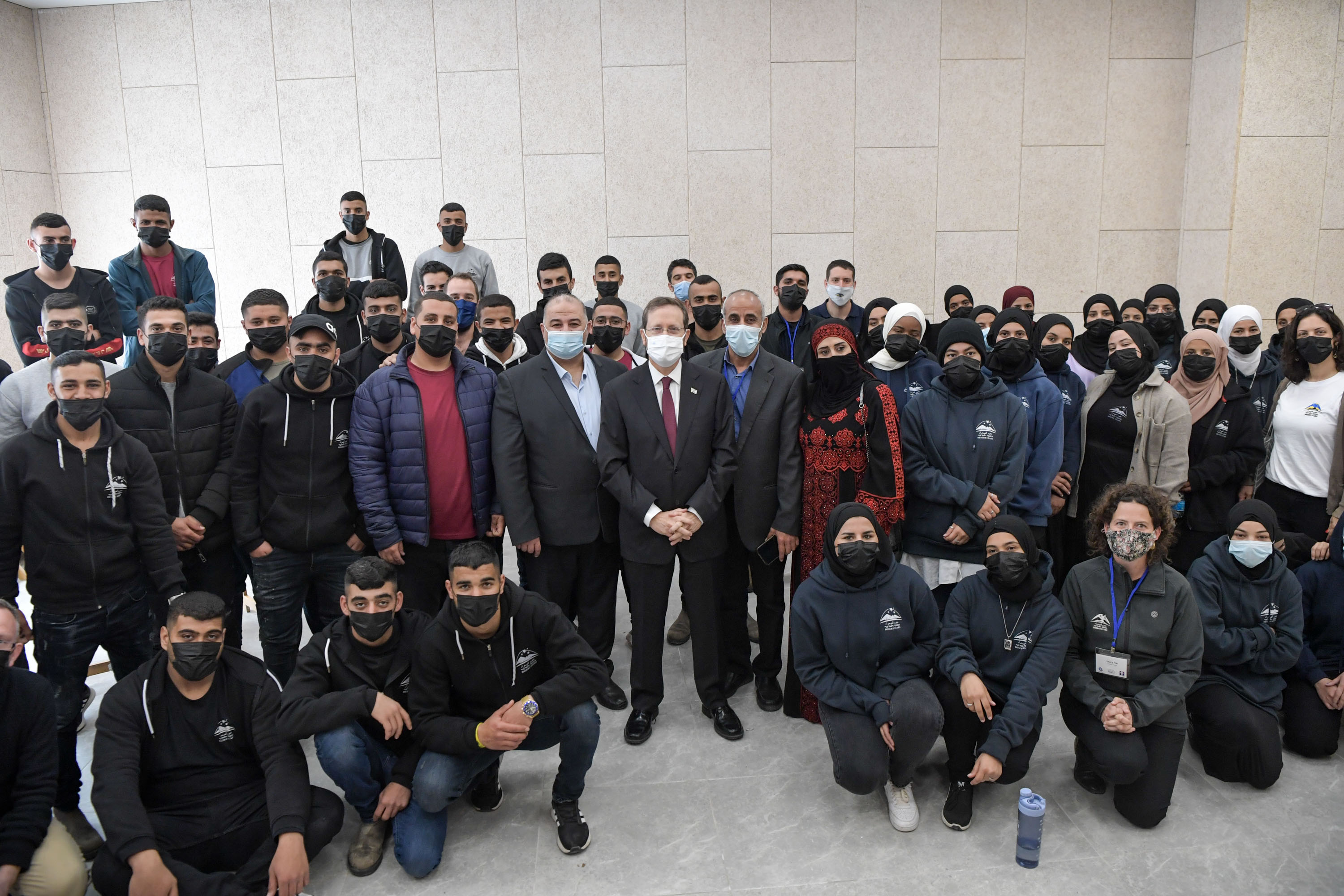
Abbas, Israeli president Isaac Herzog and young Bedouins in the city of Rahat, 15 February 2022

Under Abbas's direction the coalition government recognized several Bedouin villages and has connected tens of thousands of previously illegal homes to the electrical grid.

On 9 November 2021 Abbas met with King Abdullah II of Jordan, the first occasion where the king has met an Arab party leader who is a sitting member of the Israeli government; the two discussed the peace process and reiterated their support for a two-state solution.

On 21 December 2021 Abbas said that Israel was born as a Jewish state and will remain so, provoking outrage from members of other Arab parties. On 10 February 2022 Abbas rejected Amnesty International's charge that Israel is an apartheid state, saying of Israel: "I would not call it apartheid", though the ABC notes that he did not address whether the term could apply to the conditions in the West Bank.

=== 2022–present ===
Abbas led his party into the 2022 Israeli legislative election, where he was reelected. Abbas was praised in a November 2022 op-ed in The New York Times by former prime minister Naftali Bennett, who described him as "brave". Following the 2023 Hamas attack on Israel, Abbas urged unity between Jews and Arabs in Israel.

He condemned the Hamas-led attack on Israel on 7 October 2023. On 1 December 2023, he said that "armed Palestinian factions need to stop using weapons and turn to a diplomatic project with the Palestinian Authority to strengthen the chances of a Palestinian state and announce an inclusive and permanent ceasefire to bring about peace and an end to" the Israeli–Palestinian conflict. In response, Israel's National Security Minister Itamar Ben-Gvir called him a "terrorist supporter", Finance Minister Bezalel Smotrich accused him of supporting Israel's enemies, and Legislative Committee Chairman Simcha Rothman accused Abbas and Ra'am of being "supporters of terrorism". On the other hand, Israel's Labor Party leader Merav Michaeli praised Abbas, saying his statements demonstrate "a committed and real Jewish-Arab partnership".

In February 2026, Abbas said in an interview with Channel 12 news that Qatar pressured him to join the Netanyahu government.

Abbas has continued to support a two-state solution. In August 2026, he called on Israel to recognize an independent Palestinian state and said that its recognition should help bring an end to the occupation and the Israeli–Palestinian conflict. In October 2026, he said that he no longer considered a coalition with Benjamin Netanyahu to be an option and expressed hope for a change of government through cooperation with opposition parties.

== Ideology and political views ==
Abbas has described his political views as right-wing on religious affairs but closer to the left on foreign policy because of his support for a two-state solution. Abbas has been stated to be conservative and socially conservative and has opposed pro-LGBT legislation. He has also spoken out in support of conversion therapy for LGBT people. He is frequently referred to as an Islamist. He has lambasted political parties on the Israeli left, saying, "What have I to do with the left? … in religious matters, I'm right-wing" and said that he has more in common with conservative Jewish ultra-Orthodox parties than with socially liberal parties.

In December 2021, Abbas said that "Israel was born as a Jewish state, and it will remain that way". He publicly accepts Israel as a de facto Jewish state and states that it does not practice apartheid. His decision to do so during comments he made at a business conference caused an uproar among some in the Arab public.

Since the October 7 attacks, Abbas has condemned Hamas multiple times. Abbas described the Hamas-led attacks as "an inhuman and unjustifiable act" and stated that these acts "are not representative of the Palestinian people". In the days following the attacks he called on Hamas and other militant factions to release the hostages, saying "Islamic values command us not to imprison women, children, and elderly people. This humanitarian act must be done immediately".

== Personal life ==
Abbas serves as an imam at a mosque near Tiberias. He is married with three children and lives in Maghar; his wife, Yakoot, is a high school English teacher.
