= Hamed Abu Daabas =

Arab-Israeli politician

- حماد ابو دعابس
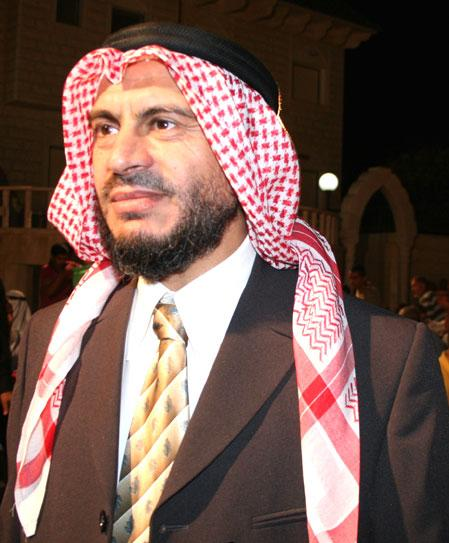
- Hamed Abu Daabas
- Born: December 1961 (age 64)
- Education: Ben Gurion University, Sapir Academic College
- Occupation: Politician
- Known for: Chairman of the southern branch of the Islamic Movement in Israel

Sheikh Hamed Abu Daabas (Arabic: حماد ابو دعابس, Hebrew: חמאד אבו דעאבס) is an Arab-Israeli of Bedouin descent, and the chairman of the southern branch of the Islamic Movement in Israel.

Abu Daabas was elected as the chairman of the southern branch of the Islamic Movement in Israel in April 2010, replacing Ibrahim Sarsur. Abu Daabas is known for his opinions in family affairs such as his opposition to cousin marriage in the Bedouin society and his support for the compromising Islamic approach to abortion that allows the procedure with some limitations.

== Biography ==
Daabas was born in December 1961 to a family of the clan of Al-Hezeel (part of the Tiyaha tribe). In 1976 he moved with his family to the newly established city of Rahat, where he joined the local schools. In 1981 Daabas started learning Behavioural sciences at the Ben Gurion University, where he also learned Social Sciences, Psychology and Cultural studies. In 1998 he started studying Political Science and Management science at the Sapir Academic College where he received his bachelor's degree with honors. He worked at the college as a lecturer for four years.

He acquired his religious knowledge from reading books and from being a student of Sheikh Abdullah Nimar Darwish, the founder of the Islamic Movement.

In May 2010 he participated in the Gaza Freedom Flotilla with Raed Salah, the head of the northern branch of the movement. He was arrested for his participation and later released.

== Islamic Movement ==
Daabas joined the Islamic Movement in 1982. In 1990 he became the head of the movement in Rahat and in that same year he became chief executive officer of the movement. In 1998 he took a break to study and in 2000 he returned and became the head of the movement in the Negev.

In 2010 Daabas was elected to be the head of the southern branch of the Islamic Movement, winning 192 votes against Ibrahim Sarsur, who was the head for 12 years and received 142 votes. He is the first head that is not from Kfar Qasim.

Upon his election Daabas began leading a reconciliation process with the northern branch of the Islamic movement, which split from the movement in 1996 as response to its decision to participate in the Israeli elections. In 2012 Daabas began officially talking about a reunion between both branches by the end of the year, and has stated that the reunion is more important to him, than participating in the Israeli elections. The announcement of the early elections in October 2012 stopped the reconciliation process, and the southern branch participated in the elections, through Ibrahim Sarsur, from the United Arab List party.

== Views ==
=== Family and abortions ===
Daabas supports abortions up to 120 days to the pregnancy, if medical checks found that the fetus has severe malformation, and in a later stage of the pregnancy, it is allowed if the mother's life is in danger. Daabas supports family planning. He thinks that bringing children to the world should not be halted, but he thinks longer breaks between births should be taken, concerning health and livelihood. In his view, marriages within the family are allowed but not advised. He advocates marriage between different families because it brings different families together and helps young people to find a better match for themselves, and as for inner-family couples, he advises to do genetic testing before marriage. He asserts that "the religion is interested in a healthy society". In 2018 Abu Daabas declared in a radio show that "Polygamy is greed".

=== Islamic State of Iraq and the Levant ===
Daabas said that "ISIS raises reasonable demands like the establishment of an Islamic state, but their methods for reaching their objective raise concern in many nations across the world." He stressed that "ISIS was hurting their cause by filming their cruel and disgusting acts. I am against the murders, but it is important to note that the killing methods of Israel and the US are not better than the crimes of the Islamic State. If it were not for the shocking ways in which they kill, it would be possible to see ISIS like any other Jihadi organization."

== See also ==
- Raed Salah
