= 2009 Al-Aqsa clashes =

Event in Palestine

In 2009, clashes between Muslim Palestinians and Israeli police erupted on September 27, 2009, and continued to late October. Violence spread through East Jerusalem and parts of the West Bank, and included throwing of Molotov cocktails and stones at Israeli security forces and civilians. Israeli police responded with arrests of rioters and sporadic age-based restriction of access to the Temple Mount. Several dozen rioters, police and Israeli civilians have been injured.

The Al-Aqsa compound sits atop the Temple Mount, the holiest site in Judaism, and is also the site of the existing al-Aqsa Mosque and Dome of the Rock, and is the third-holiest site in Islam. Israel gained control of the Mount in 1967 from Jordan, and incorporated it along with the rest of East Jerusalem into its (largely unrecognised) capital of Jerusalem; the Islamic holy sites on the Mount are managed by the Islamic waqf, while Israel is in charge of overall administration. The permanent status of the Temple Mount is generally considered to be determined by future negotiations between Israel and the Palestinian Authority.

== Background ==
The clashes followed rising tensions beginning on 2 August with the forcible evictions of nine Palestinian families in Sheikh Jarrah. During Ramadan Palestinian access to Al Aqsa Mosque was increasingly restricted. During the last week of Ramadan ending on 19 September, Palestinians from the rest of the West Bank were barred from entry into East Jerusalem for the Jewish New Year.

== Timeline of violence ==
27 September

On the eve of Yom Kippur, a group of about 15 non-Muslims (Note: The Israeli police first said the group were Jewish worshippers but later said it was "non-Jewish French tourists" while Palestinian witnesses said they were Israeli, possibly settlers and that at least two in the group wore kippahs.) entered the compound escorted by about 70 Israel Police officers in riot gear. Some 150 Muslim worshippers gathered around them, some hurling stones. 18 policemen and 17 worshippers were lightly injured. That evening, on Yom Kippur, Palestinians in the north Jerusalem neighborhood of Isawiya hurled firebombs and stones at Israeli security forces and set a number of trees on fire. Five officers were lightly injured.

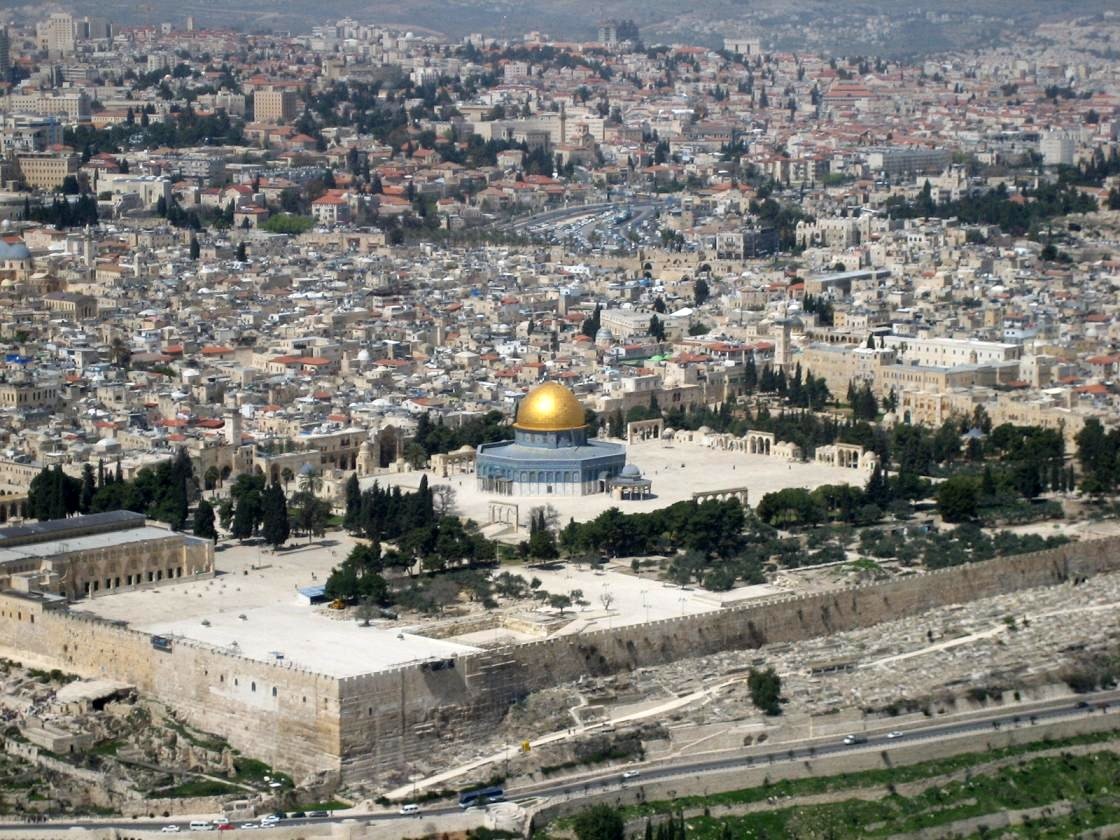
The Temple Mount from the southeast. The golden dome is Al-Aqsa's Dome of the Rock.

4 October

A group of some 150 Palestinians threw rocks and bottles at Israeli security forces in the Jerusalem neighborhood of Wadi al-Joz.

5 October

A group of Palestinians from the southeast Jerusalem neighborhood of Ras al-Amud stoned Haredi Jewish men who had stopped to pray at the cemetery on the nearby Mount of Olives. Later in the day, rocks were again thrown at police officers inside Ras al-Amud. Intermittent stone-throwing and other forms of rioting continued in east Jerusalem throughout the day. Near the Shuafat security checkpoint in north Jerusalem, Palestinian youths hurled rocks at Israeli border policemen, lightly wounding one officer. In the afternoon, a Palestinian youth stabbed a border policeman in the neck. Youths from Shuafat then began to riot, throwing stones at border policemen throughout the evening. On the outskirts of Ramallah, some 50 Palestinian youths hurled rocks and other debris at Israeli soldiers stationed nearby.

25 October

Rioters threw Molotov cocktails and stones at Israeli police forces stationed at the Temple Mount. A police force entered the Temple Mount compound and arrested 18. Nine police officers were lightly injured and 21 rioters arrested. A female Australian journalist was lightly injured by a rock. Three masked Arab men were arrested in the afternoon after hurling stones at Israeli security forces in the east Jerusalem neighborhood of Ras al-Amud. In the Old City of Jerusalem, Arabs hurled stones at passersby and policemen. There were no reports of injuries or damage.

== Involved parties ==
=== Islamic Movement in Israel ===
Sheikh Raed Salah, leader of the Islamic Movement in Israel's northern branch, told followers in early October that should Muslims have to choose between renouncing the al-Aqsa Mosque and becoming martyrs they will choose the latter.

Should the State of Israel make us choose... we will clearly choose to be martyrs, we are a nation that does not give up, we will die and win; the al-Aqsa Mosque is not a matter that can be given up on, and we shall win, God willing.

=== Palestinian Authority ===
On 5 October, Palestinian prime minister Salam Fayyad condemned Israel's decision to restrict entrance to the al-Aqsa Mosque compound on the Temple Mount in the wake of the riots, and called on Palestinians "to confront Israel".

We call on the Palestinian public to confront Israel and its plans, that are intended to prevent the Palestinian people from fulfilling their aspirations of establishing a Palestinian state in the occupied territories.

The Authority also decried "Israel's attempts to conduct Jewish prayer services in the Aksa compound" and urged the world "to force Israel to halt its efforts to Judaize the city."

=== Hamas ===
In early October, Hamas called for a new intifada (uprising) to "defend" Jerusalem and the al-Aqsa Mosque, located in the Temple Mount compound. The group issued a statement blaming Israel for the violence and saying that "harming al-Aqsa will blow up in the face of the Zionist aggression."

Hamas political leader Khaled Mashal said on 25 October declared that Jerusalem's fate would be decided by confrontation rather than negotiation, and called for angry protests throughout the Arab world.

The Israelis want to divide al-Aqsa Mosque, and this is not all. They want to hold their religious ceremonies in the mosque... in preparation for demolishing it and building their temple there... Jerusalem is all of Jerusalem, not only Abu-Dis. The Arabs and Muslims are [the city's] residents, and the Zionists have no claim over it... I call for angry protests in Palestine and in the Arab world. Today, protests began in [the] Gaza [Strip], and we hope they will spread to the West Bank. It is important for there to be a united Palestinian position. We must send a message to the world: In light of the settlements and actions in Jerusalem, there are no negotiations and we must rethink our steps.

== See also ==
- 1929 Palestine riots
- 1990 Temple Mount riots
- 2000 Al-Aqsa Intifada
