= Abdullah Nimar Darwish =

Palestinian activist

- عبد الله نمر درويش
- Born: 1948; Kafr Qasim, Mandatory Palestine
- Died: 14 May 2017 (aged 68–69); Kafr Qasim, Israel
- Occupation: Islamic leader
- Known for: Founder of the Islamic Movement in Israel

Sheikh Abdullah Nimar Darwish (Arabic: عبد الله نمر درويش, Hebrew: עבדאללה נימר דרוויש עיסא; 1948 – 14 May 2017) was the founder of the Islamic Movement in Israel.

== Biography ==
Darwish was born in Kafr Qasim in 1948. After completing his religious studies in Nablus, he returned to Kafr Qasim and began advocating a return to Islam and Islamic tradition, and subsequently established the Islamic Movement in Israel in 1971.

In 1979, Darwish established an underground organization called Usrat al-Jihad ("The Family of Jihad"), whose goal was to establish "an Arab Islamic state in Palestine". Usrat al-Jihad attempted to burn down an Israeli textile factory, set fire to forests, and was involved in the death of a suspected Israeli collaborator. Two years later, he was arrested together with several accomplices, and convicted of membership in a terrorist organization. He remained in prison until 1985, when he was freed as part of the Jibril Agreement between the government of Israel and the Popular Front for the Liberation of Palestine – General Command.

Following his 1985 release, Darwish became publicly active and began to express opposition to Israeli Arabs taking part in violent behavior. In 1992, he explicitly condemned the killing of three Israeli soldiers by an Israeli Arab group. Following the Oslo Accords, the Islamic Movement in Israel Darwish had founded, split between the "Northern Branch" (in northern Israel), led by Darwish's protégé Sheikh Raed Salah—that opposed the agreement—and one led by Darwish himself, referred to as the "Southern Branch" (in southern Israel) that supported it and wanted to participate in the Israeli political process.

In later life, he continued as the spiritual leader of the Southern Branch of the Islamic Movement in Israel. In partnership with Rabbi Michael Melchior, he played an important role in setting up a major interfaith meeting in Alexandria, Egypt in 2002, during the Second Intifada; this group produced a joint declaration rejecting murder in the name of God and pledging a joint quest for peace.

Following the death of his brother in 2005, Darwish made a religious ruling allowing Muslims to donate organs for medical purposes.

Darwish founded the "Adam Centers for Dialogue Between Religions and Civilizations", and—with Rabbi Melchior—founded the Religious Peace Initiative, both of which arranges for interfaith dialogue between Muslims, Jews, and Christians. This network worked behind the scenes to ease inter-communal tensions in Acre in 2008, and to prevent inter-communal violence in 2014, when Eid al-Adha and Yom Kippur occurred on the same day.

He expressed a commitment to the rule of law, and to integration into the State of Israel and its institutions. In a 2001 Israeli newspaper interview, he said:

"Whoever establishes a movement that is based on violation of the law, does not represent us. However, in the West Bank and Gaza there is no rule of law, there is an occupation which must be eliminated, and not a state which must be respected. Therefore, I understand the Palestinians or the Lebanese, which are rising up in any way they can... If I were being occupied, I too would rise up, but the moment I decided that I am a part of the state as long as I am within the borders of the Green Line, I obey the law, together with my representatives in the Knesset, and this is proof that I do recognize the State of Israel. This despite the fact that I too feel as though I am under mental occupation, but the world does not see that."

In 2007, Darwish won praise for being the first Muslim leader to speak at the Global Forum for Combatting Anti-Semitism. During his speech, he criticized Iranian President Mahmoud Ahmadinejad for denying the Holocaust, saying: Tell all who deny the Holocaust to ask the Germans what they did or did not do." Acknowledging that it was difficult for him to appear at the event because of the negative responses he would receive from clerical colleagues across the Islamic world, he denounced antisemitism as not expressing the true spirit of Islam; he also criticized the Israeli government's refusal to participate in peace talks sponsored by Saudi Arabia that included Hamas and Fatah.

In 2015, Darwish and Melchior condemned the 2015 terror attacks in Copenhagen, Denmark.

== Legacy ==
Mansour Abbas, the current leader of Ra'am, is a disciple of Darwish; Abbas has said: "Everything I do today I absorbed from the legacy of Sheikh Abdullah Nimr Darwish." Abbas' decision to support a coalition government in 2021 has been credited to Darwish's belief that political participation in the Israeli state would help improve the lives of Palestinians in Israel and further the aim of Israeli-Palestinian peace; Abbas said that it was at Darwish's funeral that he realized he should play a more active role in furthering Darwish's vision.

Sheikh Raed Bader is considered an important spiritual successor to Darwish.

== Personal life ==
Darwish died on 14 May 2017, aged 69. His friend and colleague Rabbi Melchior delivered a tearful eulogy to Darwish at his funeral.

== See also ==
- Hamed Abu Daabas
- Raed Salah
- Islamic Movement in Israel
