= Ibrahim Sarsur =

Arab-Israeli politician

- إبراهيم صرصور
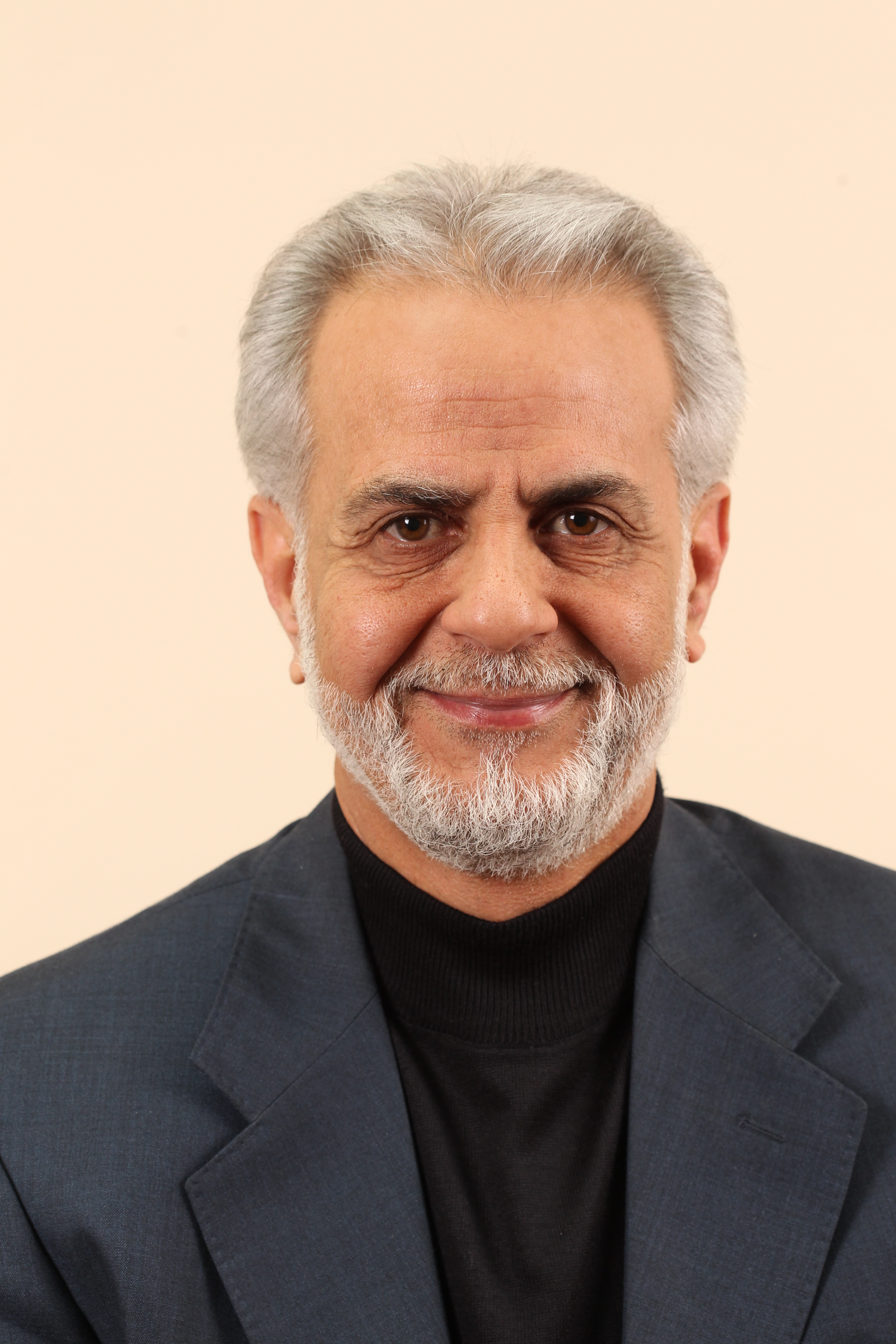

Faction represented in the Knesset
- 2006–2015: United Arab List

Personal details
- Born: 2 February 1959 (age 67) Kafr Qasim, Israel

Sheikh Ibrahim Sarsur (Arabic: إبراهيم صرصور, Hebrew: אבראהים צרצור; born 2 February 1959) is an Israeli Arab politician. A former leader of the United Arab List, he represented the party in the Knesset from 2006 to 2015.

== Biography ==
Born in Kafr Qasim, Sarsur studied English literature and English linguistics at Bar-Ilan University during the 1970s. He became a member of Kafr Qasim council in 1989, serving on it until becoming the head of the southern faction of the Islamic Movement (considered more moderate than its northern counterpart) in 1999. He also became one of the heads of the High Follow-Up Committee for Arab Citizens of Israel.

In the 2006 elections he was elected to the Knesset. He spoke out against a meeting of Arab lesbians in 2007, releasing a statement saying that "all respectable people from all communities and streams to stand up against preaching sexual deviance among our women and girls." He also claimed there were no homosexuals in the Muslim community. Following an Israeli air strike in the Gaza Strip which killed a woman and her four children in April 2008, he compared the actions of Israel to those of the Nazis: "Israel's killing of innocent people is reminiscent of some very dark times, including that of the Nazis."

In April 2010 Sarsur lost in the elections of the southern branch to Sheikh Hamed Abu Daabas. Abu Daabas received 192 votes while Sarsur received 142.

Sarsur was re-elected in 2009. In a June 2011 speech he praised Hezbollah for "defeating" Israel and called for a new caliphate to be established with its capital in Jerusalem.

He was re-elected again in 2013. Later in the year he signed a petition along with 105 other MKs calling for the release of the Jewish-American Jonathan Pollard, who was imprisoned by the United States for spying for Israel. Sarsur was quoted as saying that he "felt an emotional kinship with Pollard when [he] heard about the conditions under which he lives", comparing Pollard's treatment to that of Palestinian prisoners in Israeli prisons.

Sarsur retired from politics prior to the 2015 elections, and was given a symbolic 119th place on the Joint List, an alliance of Hadash and several Arab parties.

His successor as party leader is Masud Ghnaim.

== See also ==
- List of Arab members of the Knesset
