= Kafr Qasim =

City in central Israel

Kafr Qasim: כַּפְר קָסִם, כפר קאסם; كفر قاسم
- City (from 2008)

Hebrew transcription(s)
  - ISO 259: Kpar Qásim, Kpar Qáˀsem
  - Also spelled: Kafar Qasem (official); Kufur Kassem (unofficial)
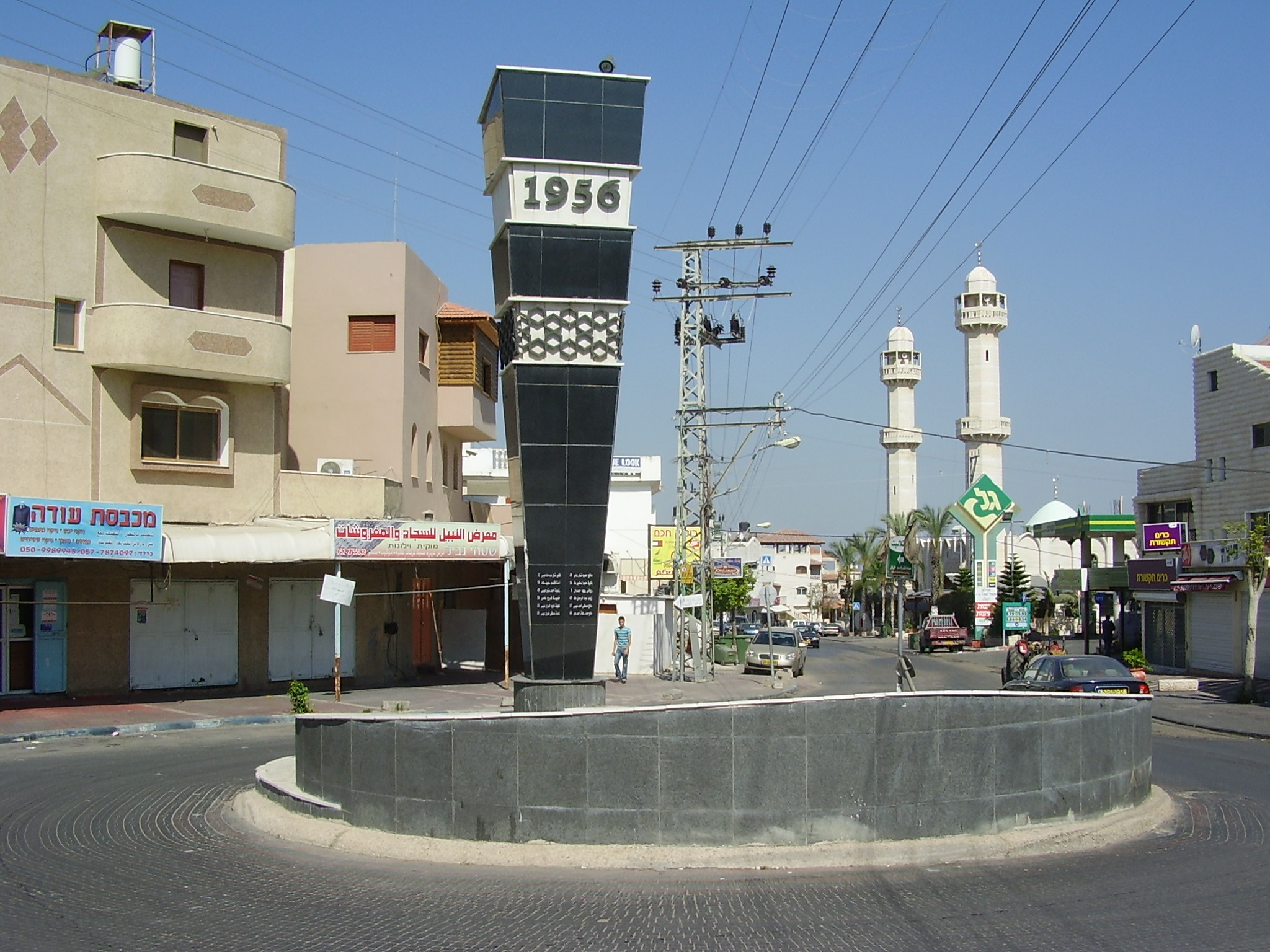
- Roundabout in Kafr Qasim with a monument for the massacre in 1956, the central mosque with another monument, and mixed-used buildings.

- Emblem of Kafr Qasim

- Location within Central Israel Location within Israel
- Coordinates: 32°06′54″N 34°58′30″E
- Grid position: 148/168 PAL
- Country: Israel
- District: Central
- Subdistrict: Petah Tikva
- Natural Region: Petah Tikva
- Original settlement: Neolithic
- Modern city: 2008

Government
  - Mayor: Haitam Taha

Area
  - Total: 9,154 dunams (9.154 km^{2}; 3.534 sq mi)

Population (2024)
  - Total: 27,996
  - Density: 3,058/km^{2} (7,921/sq mi)
- Name meaning: The village of Kasim
- Website: kfar-qasem.muni.il

Kafr Qasim (Arabic: كفر قاسم, Hebrew: כַּפְר קָאסִם), also spelled as Kafr Qassem, Kufur Kassem, Kfar Kassem and Kafar Kassem, is an Arab city in Israel. It is located about 20 km (12 mi) east of Tel Aviv, on the Israeli side of the Green Line separating Israel and the West Bank, in the southern portion of the "Little Triangle" of Arab-Israeli towns and villages. In 2024 its population was 27,996. The town was the site of the Kafr Qasim massacre, in which the Israel Border Police killed 49 civilians on October 29, 1956. On February 12, 2008, Israeli Minister of the Interior Meir Sheetrit declared Kafr Qasim a city in a ceremony held at the town.

== History ==
The town's area was populated in ancient times, based on remains from the Middle Paleolithic period found in the Qesem Cave. Cisterns, a winepress and terraced fields have also been documented, together with remains from the Byzantine era.

Kafr Qasim is identified with Kefar Kesem (Hebrew: כפר קסם), mentioned in the Tosefta as home to a pagan holy tree.

North of Kafr Qassim lies the site of Kafr Hatta (Arabic: كفرحتا). In the fourth century, it had a sizable Samaritan villa which was uncovered by archaeologists in 2025. In the 16th century, Kafr Hatta is listed as inhabited, but it became abandoned before the 19th century, with its land being absorbed by Kafr Qasim.

=== Ottoman Empire ===
In 1838, during the Ottoman period, it was noted as a Muslim village, Kefr Kasim, in Jurat Merda, south of Nablus.

Charles van de Velde visited the site in 1851–52, noting "the many ancient stones used in the construction of the present houses and many other remains indicating an ancient site."

In 1870 Victor Guérin visited the village, which he called Kafr Kasim. He found the place to be "the site of a more ancient town, as is shown by cisterns and the mass of rubbish found outside the present village". The village had about four hundred inhabitants.

In 1882, the PEF's Survey of Western Palestine described the village as being of moderate size, with buildings constructed principally of adobe, on low hill in open ground. The survey also noted the existence of a rock-cut tomb to the south of the village.

=== British Mandate ===
In 1917, during World War I, Kafr Qasim (together with the rest of the area) was captured from the ruling Ottoman Empire by the British Army and was later placed under the British Mandate of Palestine.

In the 1922 census of Palestine Kufr Quasem had a population of 661, all Muslims, increasing in the 1931 census to 989, still all Muslims, in a total of 241 houses.

In 1945 the population of Kafr Qasim was 1,460, all Muslims, who owned 12,765 dunams of land according to an official land and population survey. 239 dunams were for citrus and bananas, 491 were plantations and irrigable land, and 8,980 were planted with cereals, while 58 dunams were built-up (urban) land.

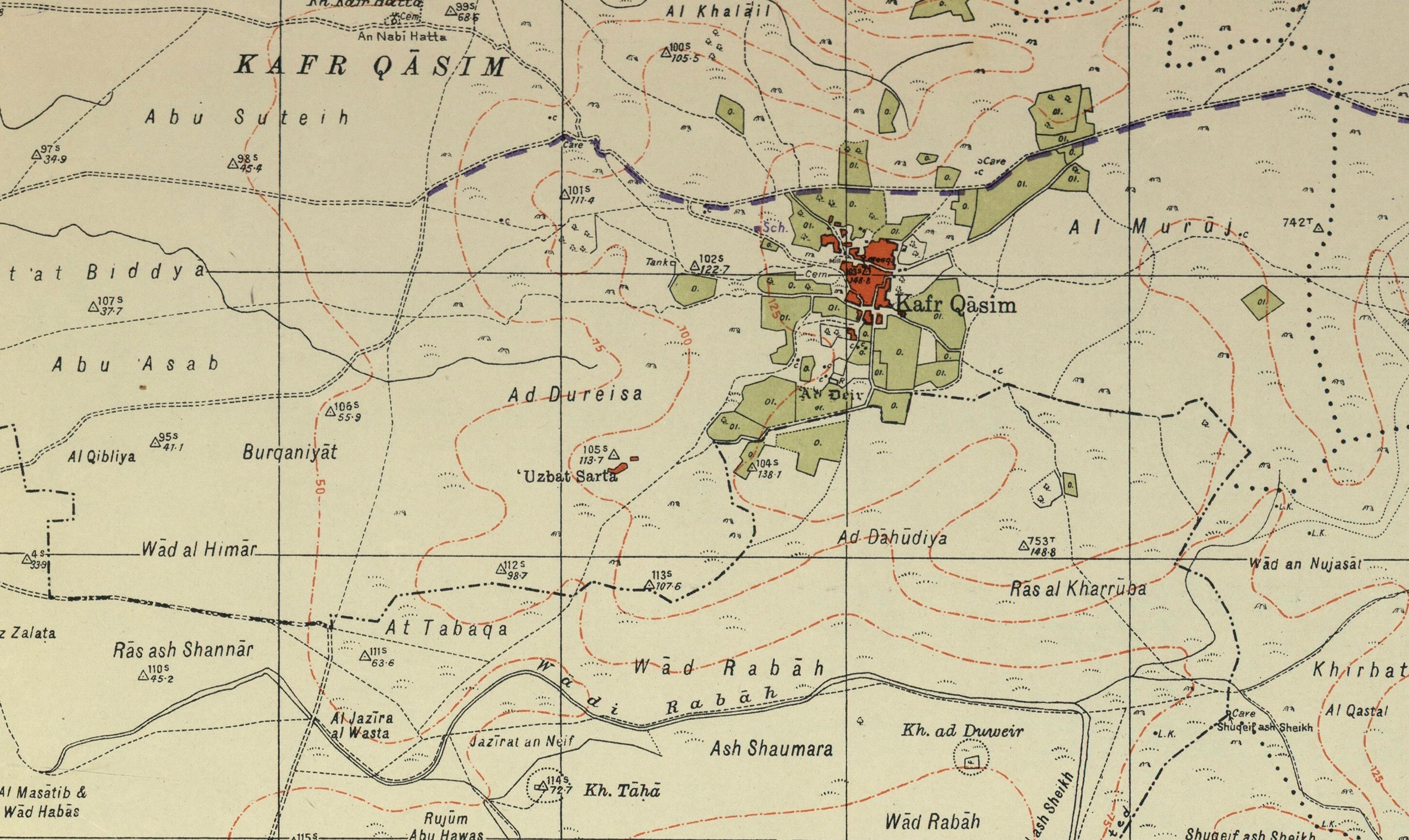
Kafr Qasim in 1941

=== Israel ===
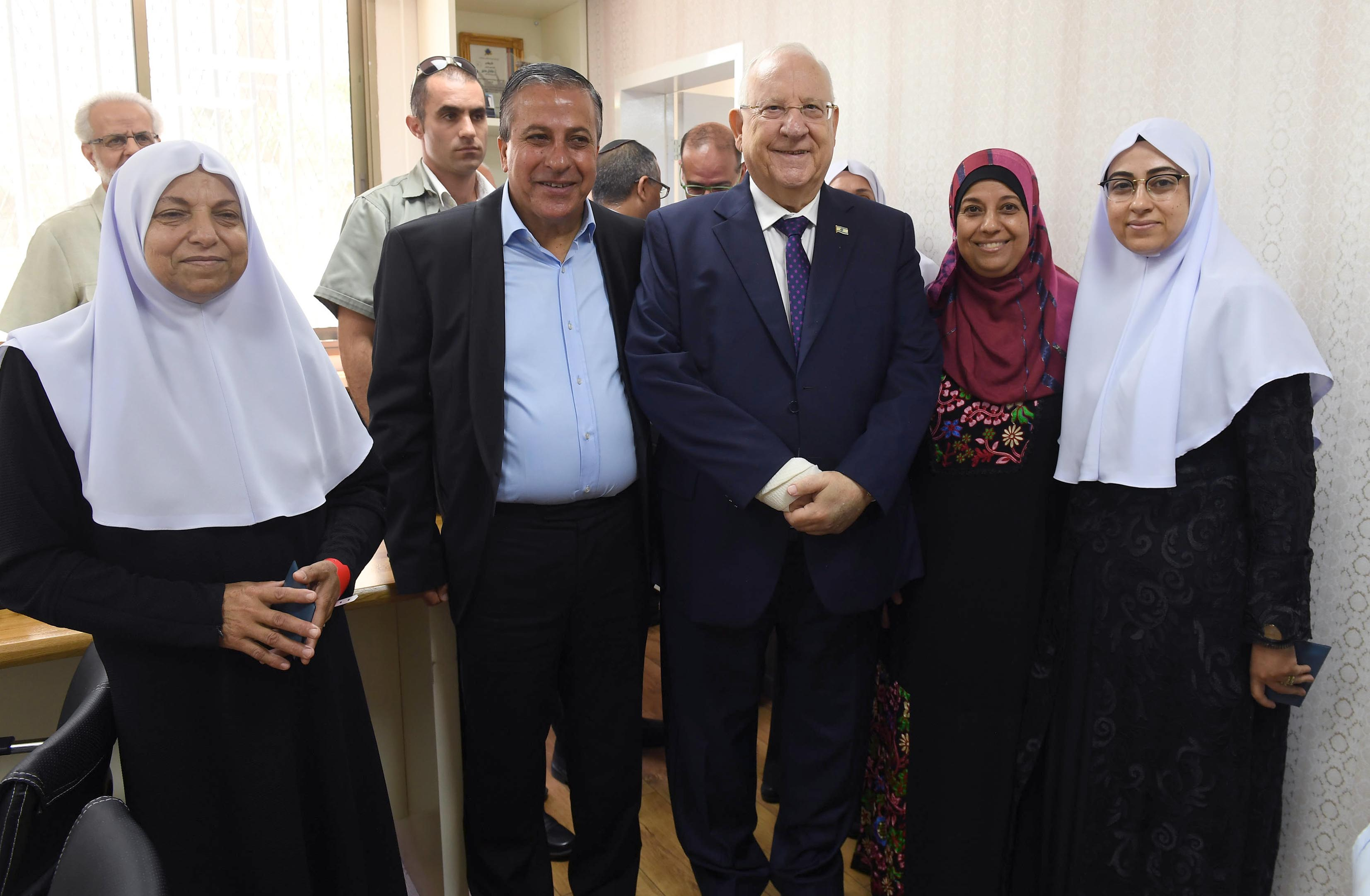
Mayor Adel Badir and President Reuven Rivlin at City Hall in 2018

==== 20th century ====
Israeli military advances came to a halt at Kafr Qasim during the 1948 Arab-Israeli War. In 1949, Israel annexed the town in accordance with the 1949 Armistice Agreements.

On October 29, 1956, on the eve of the joint Israeli, French and British invasion of Egypt, Israel moved up the time of the local curfew as it was concerned that nearby Jordan would enter the fighting. After the curfew started, a platoon of Israeli border police who had been sent to the area encountered and killed 49 villagers returning to Kafr Qasim from their work in the fields. Though the village head had been informed a half an hour before the military curfew started, he informed the Israeli commander that the fellahin and shepherds could not be notified in time that the curfew had been imposed. The incident became known as the Kafr Qasim massacre. In October 2021, the president of Israel Isaac Herzog made an official apology for the 1956 massacre, on behalf of the state.

In 1959, the town was granted local council status by the Israeli Interior Ministry.

==== 21st century ====
Sheikh Abdullah Nimar Darwish started the Islamic Movement. Israeli parliamentarian Sheikh Ibrahim Sarsur, a native of Kafr Qasim, served for a decade on the town council and heads the southern faction of the Islamic Movement of Israel since 1999. In December 2007, President Shimon Peres formally apologised for the Kafr Qasim massacre.

In 2007 development plans for the industrial and logistical area Lev HaAretz were approved. Development started in 2008. Steimatzky is one of many companies who moved into this area. Also in 2008, the Ministry of the Interior announced that Kafr Qasim would become a city.

== Demographics ==
Historical population
Year	Pop.	±%
1972	4,900	—
1983	8,000	+63.3%
1995	12,500	+56.2%
2008	18,400	+47.2%
2022	26,389	+43.4%
2024	27,997	+6.1%

According to the Israel Central Bureau of Statistics, the town had 21,100 mostly Muslim inhabitants at the end of 2012. There are 936 females for every 1,000 males. The population increases at an annual rate of 2.7%.

The social-economic rank of the town is relatively low (3 out of 10). Only 50.2% of 12th graders were eligible for graduation (Bagrut) certificates in 2000. The average monthly wage in 2000 was 3,633 NIS, as opposed to the national average of 6,835 NIS at that time.

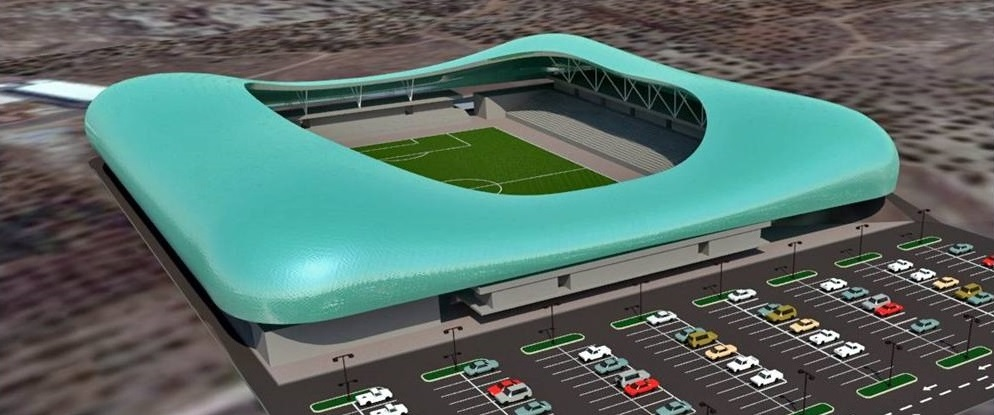
Rendering of Kfar Qassem Football Stadium Designed by Moti Bodek Architects

== Culture ==
Kafr Qasim served as the primary filming location for the Israeli political thriller television series Fauda.

F.C. Kafr Qasim plays in the Leumit League (second division). Following their promotion to the national league, it plays home matches at the Lod Municipal Stadium in Lod. A new stadium is under construction.

== Voting patterns ==
In the 2022 election, 92 percent of voters in Kafr Qasim voted for the Arab parties, while 7 percent voted for the parties of the center-left coalition led by Yair Lapid and 0.4 percent voted for the parties of the right-wing coalition led by Benjamin Netanyahu. Among the voters for the Arab parties, 73 percent voted for Ra'am, while 14 percent voted for the Hadash–Ta'al list and 13 percent voted for Balad.

In the 2026 election, 97 percent of voters in Kafr Qasim voted for the Arab parties, while 3 percent voted for the parties of the center-left coalition led by Gadi Eisenkot and 0.2 percent voted for the parties of the right-wing coalition led by Benjamin Netanyahu. Among the voters for the Arab parties, 75 percent voted for Ra'am, while 25 percent voted for the Joint List. Voter turnout increased 43 percent from the 2022 election.

== Notable people ==
- Walid Badir, Israeli international footballer
- Abdullah Nimar Darwish, founder of the Islamic Movement in Israel
- Issawi Frej, Knesset member
- Samah Mar'ab, international footballer
- Rubel Sarsour, Israeli international footballer
- Ibrahim Sarsur, Knesset member

== See also ==
- Arab localities in Israel
- Kafr Qasem Sign Language

== Bibliography ==
- Barron, J. B., ed. (1923). Palestine: Report and General Abstracts of the Census of 1922. Government of Palestine.
- Conder, C.R.; Kitchener, H. H. (1882). The Survey of Western Palestine: Memoirs of the Topography, Orography, Hydrography, and Archaeology. Vol. 2. London: Committee of the Palestine Exploration Fund.
- Department of Statistics (1945). Village Statistics, April, 1945. Government of Palestine.
- Guérin, V. (1875). Description Géographique Historique et Archéologique de la Palestine (in French). Vol. 2: Samarie, pt. 2. Paris: L'Imprimerie Nationale.
- Hadawi, S. (1970). Village Statistics of 1945: A Classification of Land and Area ownership in Palestine. Palestine Liberation Organization Research Center.
- Khalaily, Hamudi (October 2, 2005). "Kafr Qasim, (East)". Hadashot Arkheologiyot – Excavations and Surveys in Israel (117).
- Mills, E., ed. (1932). Census of Palestine 1931. Population of Villages, Towns and Administrative Areas. Jerusalem: Government of Palestine.
- Palmer, E. H. (1881). The Survey of Western Palestine: Arabic and English Name Lists Collected During the Survey by Lieutenants Conder and Kitchener, R. E. Transliterated and Explained by E.H. Palmer. Committee of the Palestine Exploration Fund.
- Robinson, E.; Smith, E. (1841). Biblical Researches in Palestine, Mount Sinai and Arabia Petraea: A Journal of Travels in the year 1838. Vol. 3. Boston: Crocker & Brewster.
- Tendler, Avrohom S. (April 14, 2015). "Kafr Qasim, (East)". Hadashot Arkheologiyot – Excavations and Surveys in Israel (127).
- Velde, van de, C. W. M. (1858). Memoir to Accompany the Map of the Holy Land. Gotha: Justus Perthes.
- Zbenovich, Vladimir; Barda, Leticia; Haiman, Mordechai (March 10, 2005). "Kafr Qasim, Development Survey". Hadashot Arkheologiyot – Excavations and Surveys in Israel (117).
