= Raed Salah =

Palestinian politician (born 1958)

Sheikh Raed Salah
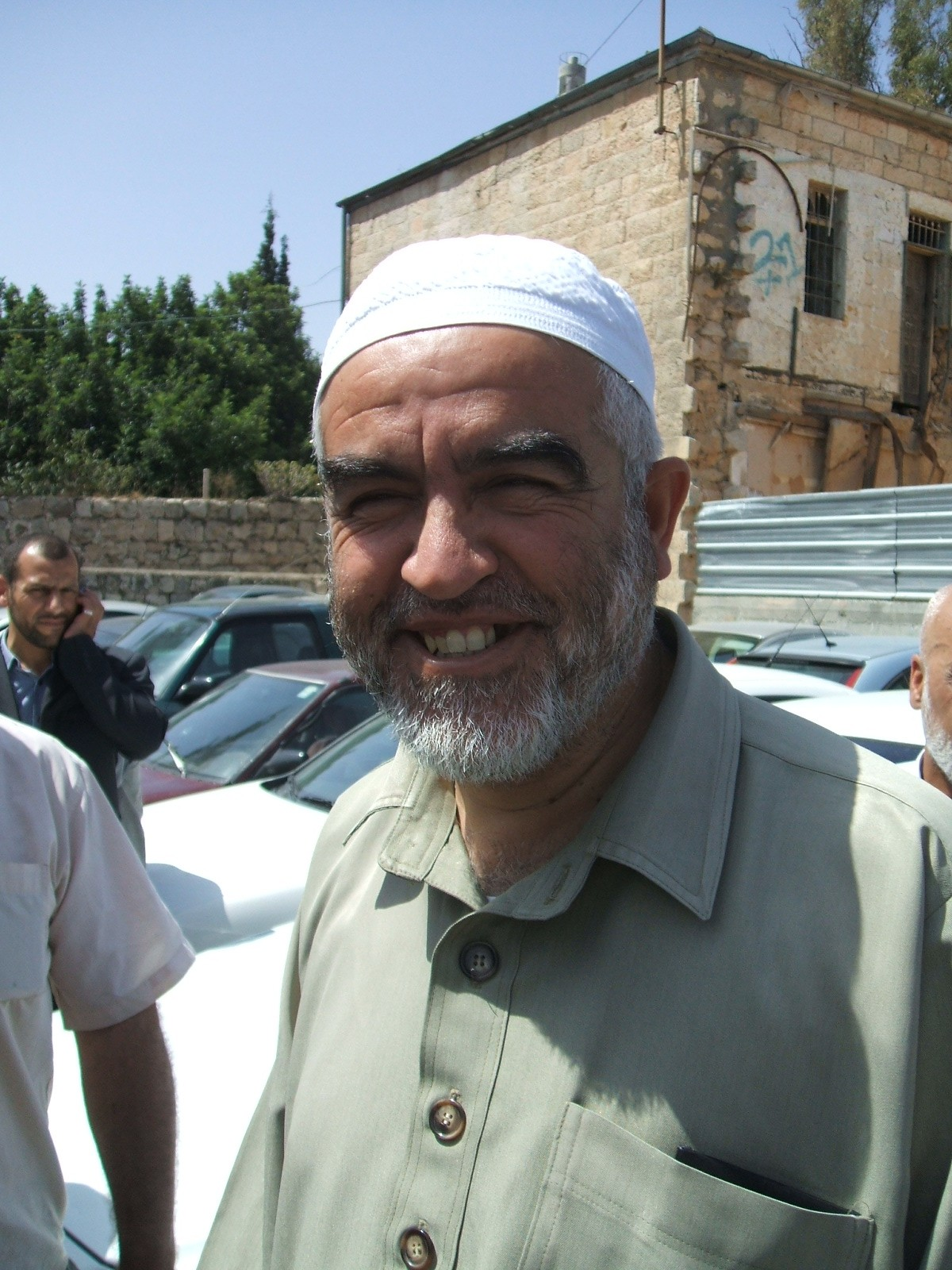
- Raed Salah in 2010
- Born: 1958 (age 67–68); Umm al-Fahm, Israel
- Citizenship: Israel
- Education: Hebron University
- Occupation: Islamic preacher
- Known for: Leader of the Northern Branch of the Islamic Movement in Israel
- Children: 8

Sheikh Raed Salah Abu Shakra (Note: Arabic: رائد صلاح, Hebrew: ראאד סלאח) is a Palestinian religious leader from Umm al-Fahm. He is the leader of the Northern Branch of the Islamic Movement in Israel. Salah was elected mayor of his hometown Umm al-Falm—an Israeli-Arab city bordering the Green Line—three times. As a Palestinian with Israeli citizenship, he came to prominence for his defense of the holy sites and his participation on the MV Mavi Marmara, the Turkish boat that was stormed by Israeli navy as it attempted to break the siege of Gaza in May 2010.

Salah is a popular figure in the Muslim world and among Palestinians for his staunch defense of al-Aqsa against what he sees as Israeli attempts to take it over. He has held sermons praising the "defenders of al-Aqsa" and his Northern Branch has organized free bus trips from Palestinian localities in Israel to Jerusalem in order to strengthen the bond between Muslims and the holy sites.

Israel has accused Salah of inciting violence and supporting terrorism. Israel has arrested Salah numerous times and he has spent many years in Israeli prisons, but these arrests have increased his popularity.

In 2021, Raed Salah was awarded Al-Murabit Prize by International Union of Muslim Scholars.

== Biography ==
Salah was born in 1958 in Umm al-Fahm. His father was a police officer and his two brothers followed in their fathers footsteps. From 1977 to 1980, he studied Islamic law at Hebron University and soon he co-founded the Islamic Movement in Israel, reportedly an offshoot of the Muslim Brotherhood.

In 1989, the Movement decided to participate in elections for Palestinian localities in Israel. It won control of six city councils. Salah became mayor of his hometown Umm al-Fahm, winning 70% of the vote, a significant victory for the Movement. Salah won again in 1993 and 1997 before standing down in 2001 to focus on other issues. In particular, on the defense of al-Aqsa, which he felt was threatened by Israel.

The Movement split in 1996 into a Northern and Southern Branch as the Southern Branch intended to field candidates to run for the Knesset, Israel's national parliament. The Northern Branch, led by Salah, believed that would be tantamount to recognizing the legitimacy of the State of Israel.

Since stepping down as mayor of Umm al-Fahm, Salah has become a popular preacher among Palestinians in Israel. He has been arrested numerous times; on suspicion of fundraising for Hamas and for his popular sermons that Israeli authorities claim often involve incitement of violence. The multiple arrests has only boosted his popularity among Palestinians. Professor Elie Rekhess, director of the Adenauer Program for Jewish-Arab Studies at Tel Aviv University in 2006 stated:

"If there were a poll run today to establish who is the most popular leader in Israel, he would be up there. His outer appearance might be misleading, because he's very quiet and low-keyed, but he's very powerful. He certainly sees political Islam as a major factor in the formulation in the coming years in Israel, and he sees his party as having a strong say."

Roee Nahmias, writing for the Israeli news site Ynet wrote in 2007:

"Since his release from prison two years ago Sheikh Salah has been steadily building a name for himself as a leader for all Muslims, this despite the fact that he lives in Israel. By focusing on social issues he has won over people from the bottom up, though his followers say his humbleness, manners and simple attire also helped establish his persona as a leader."

In an interview in 2011, Amal Jamal—professor of politics at Tel Aviv University—described Salah as offering a: "warm, spiritual, inclusive" version of Islam even secularists can sympathize with. Jamal praised Salah for being:

"... a charismatic leader who has proved he is willing to pay a price for his beliefs. His position contrasts strongly with that of Knesset members who enjoy parliamentary immunity. Other politicians don't dare attack him because of his personal integrity and because they fear the backlash from the religious community."

Under Salah's leadership, the Northern Branch has strengthened Muslim ties to al-Aqsa. It has organized free bus trips, allowing tens of thousands of Muslims in Israel to pray at the mosque. In 2012, the Northern Branch founded the Murabitat and the Mourabitoun, organizations that organized activities for Muslims at al-Aqsa. The organizations gained notoriety for their hostile protests against Jews who visited al-Aqsa. In 2015, Israel banned the Murabitat and the Mourabitoun and a few months later the Northern Branch itself, claiming it incited violence.

=== Personal life ===
He has eight children, a wife, and is gained respect as a poet.

== Views ==
=== Arabs voting in Knesset elections ===
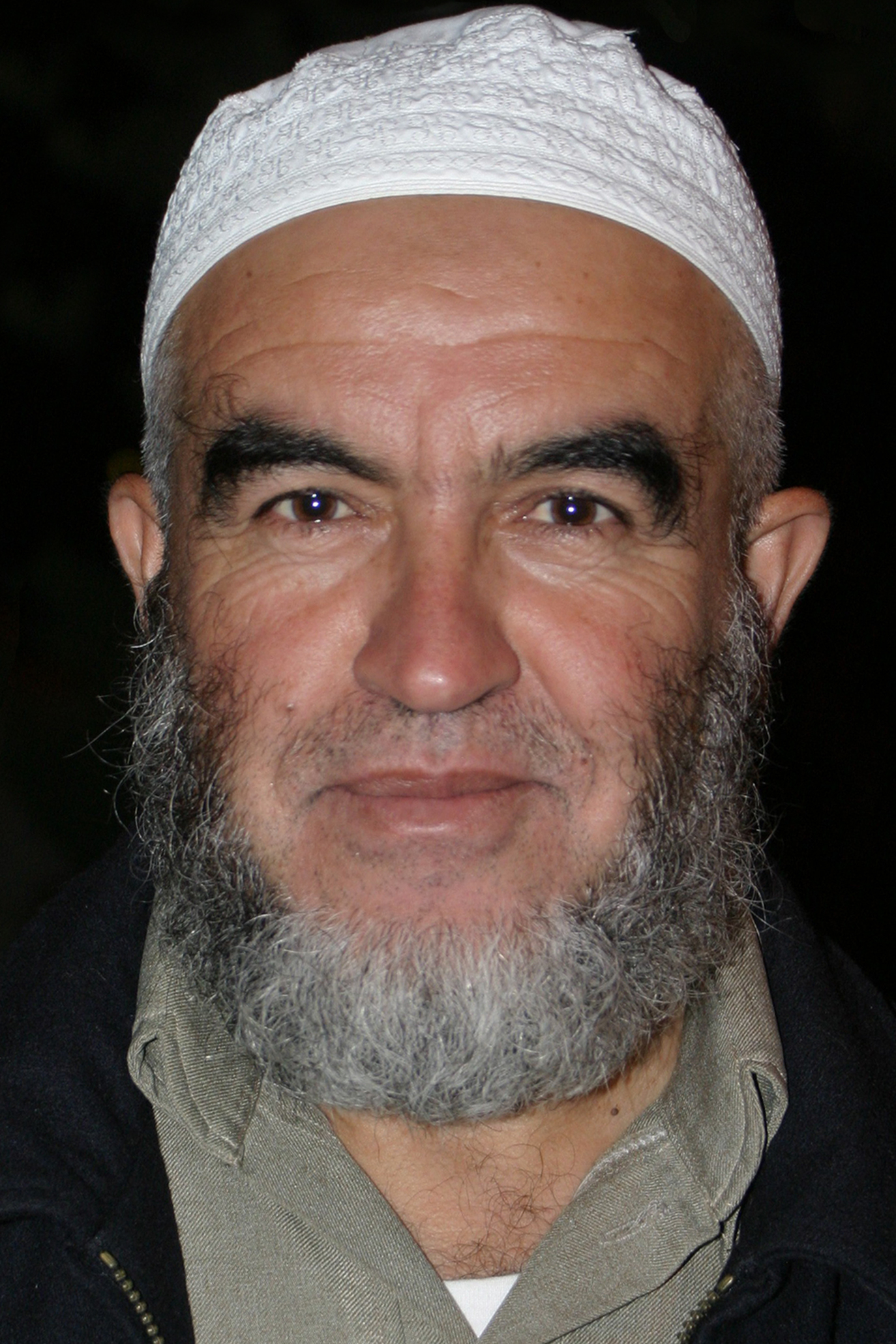
Photograph of Salah, September 2008

Salah discourages Palestinian-Israelis from participating and voting in Israeli national elections. He believes that Arab representation in the Israeli parliament lends it undeserved credibility:

"Arab representation in the Knesset does not bring any qualitative changes. At best, the Knesset is a stage to voice Arab-Palestinian protest, nothing more. Yet there is a price for that, since it provides the Israeli establishment with a cover, as the Knesset appears to be a democratic institution, which is not the case. It remains one of the foundations of the Zionist enterprise."

He however downplays the schism between the Northern and Southern Branches of the Islamic Movement, who does field candidates in national elections. He believes that it is merely a question of tactics: "the two branches are based on the same ideology and agree about all fundamentals. They disagree merely on tactics".

=== Israeli occupation ===
Saleh also rejects the notion that there would be a difference between Palestinians living in Israel and those living in the Israeli-occupied West Bank:

"As we see it, the Green Line means nothing, and there is no difference between Umm al-Fahm and Jenin [situated a few kilometres to the southwest, on the other side of the Green Line]. We all live under occupation, and our struggle is essentially the same."

In 2011, while addressing an audience of students from Tel Aviv University, he reiterated his anti-occupation position stating: "We must keep fighting until we remove the Israeli occupation and free the holy Jerusalem".

=== Arabic language ===
Salah believes that the Arabic language is threatened in Israel by Hebrew, which is the country's main language. He believes that preserving the Arabic language is important to preserving Palestinian identity: "If we want to preserve our identity, we have to preserve the Arabic language, and if we want to preserve Arabic, we have to love it". He likens the usage of Hebrew terms in the language as an invasion:

"When we allow our tongues to be invaded daily by the use of Hebrew terms, it means that our land, homes, holy places, identity and thinking in Palestine are invaded and all components of our lives as individuals and collectives are attacked."

=== Accusations of anti-Semitism and response ===
==== Blood libel accusation ====
Salah has on several occasions been accused of antisemitism. His detractors claimed that he referenced the blood libel antisemitic trope during a protest in East Jerusalem in 2007, a claim he strongly denied. A statement from his office called the accusation: "an absolute lie and a malicious fabrication". It continued: "Mr Salah was arrested and questioned over these allegations in Israel and released when they were revealed as being wholly fabricated with no evidence". Salah was acquitted of charges in connection with rioting that followed the speech.

==== 9/11 conspiracy theory ====
In 2011, Salah published an article in Sawt al-Haq w'al-Huriyya in which he rhetorically asked: "Were 4,000 Jewish clerks absent by chance, or was there another reason?" alluding to the conspiracy theory that the Israeli secret service—Mossad—was behind the September 11 attacks and had warned Jews not to turn up to work on the day of the attack.

==== Response to accusations of racism ====
In 2011, in a statement in response to such allegations, Salah stated: "I unequivocally condemn all forms of racism, including anti-Semitism, Islamophobia, and racism towards my own people, the Palestinians".

Saleh believes that Zionists want to equate anti-Zionism with antisemitism. In an interview in 2020 he said:

"We are in a new phase in which it is prohibited to criticise Zionism, in the sense that they want to make anti-Zionism synonymous with antisemitism. All those who criticize Zionism now will be subject to the measures that were taken against those accused of antisemitism."

=== Gaza war ===
Salah has been active during the Gaza war. In October 2023, in an interview with AhlulBayt News Agency (ABNA), he was quoted supporting an end to the war, saying: "Raise your voices and say no to war, no to the demolition of mosques, churches, and synagogues".

Many of Salah's views regarding the Gaza war are listed below via an interview with the online Al-Estikal Newspaper:

==== Settler incursions within the Temple Mount ====
"These incursions are not new. They have happened before and have resurfaced today, and they will likely continue in the near future. The Israeli Occupation, according to its delusional calculations, aims to impose its religious sovereignty over al-Aqsa Mosque. It seems that Israel wants to move from its current phase, where it believes it has succeeded in imposing its occupation on al-Aqsa, to imposing religious sovereignty. Israel imagines that if it succeeds in this, it will be able to perform its Talmudic prayers openly at al-Aqsa. The next steps would include offering sacrifices for its festivals at the mosque and then publicly moving towards constructing an alleged temple on al-Aqsa's grounds. I firmly believe that all of these delusions will backfire, and Israel will realize that al-Aqsa is a Qur'anic truth that endures just as the Quran itself does. al-Aqsa [sic] remains the same today as it was in the past and will remain so until the Day of Judgment."

==== Arab world's response to the Gaza genocide ====
"The official Arab response has been disappointing, including the roles of the Arab League and the Organization of Islamic Cooperation. As for the people, they are largely powerless. If given the freedom to express themselves fully, the Arab world would have witnessed mass protests and demonstrations by the millions over the past ten months since the Gaza tragedy, creating a resounding outcry throughout the Arab nations. Such mobilization would likely continue until the humanitarian crisis in Gaza is resolved. Unfortunately, the Arab people are in a helpless situation. We continue to love them and hope for their true freedom and independence, just as we wish for our Palestinian people."

==== Arab states' normalization of relations with Israel ====
"The U.S. and Israeli institutions, through the normalization process with certain Arab and Gulf states—known as the Abraham Accords—hoped to sideline the Palestinian issue, including the issues of Jerusalem and the al-Aqsa Mosque. It seems as though these issues have been disregarded by those involved in this normalization, as if there are no obstacles to opening embassies, airports, and facilitating travel and visits between these normalizing countries and Israel. As a result, Israel has been able to monopolize the Palestinian cause, the issue of Jerusalem, and the al-Aqsa Mosque, linking the fate of these normalizing states to that of Israel, rather than to Palestinian rights or the sanctity of Jerusalem and al-Aqsa. This has allowed Israel to focus on Gaza, leading to a worsening humanitarian crisis that is broadcast live for the world to see."

==== Global response to the Gaza war ====
"In terms of global public support, the Palestinian cause, particularly through Gaza, has received unprecedented backing, with even previously inactive nations like Japan seeing segments of their population take to the streets in support of Palestine. This support has extended across continents, including the Americas, Europe, and aware African nations like South Africa. This global awakening to the Gaza humanitarian crisis has fostered an international solidarity that no other cause has achieved, promising positive impacts on the future of the Palestinian issue. Regarding official roles of states and governments, the U.S. and certain European countries like Britain, France, Germany, and Italy, are leading the war on Gaza alongside Israel. These nations view Israel as a Western project rather than merely a Zionist one and defend it as they would Washington, London, Paris, Rome, or Berlin. Despite this, some countries, notably South Africa, Antonio Guterres, the UN Secretary-General, and various international human rights, humanitarian, and media organizations, have stood against these Western powers. This has led to a growing global political stature for the Palestinian cause, which is likely to have positive implications for the future of the Palestinian cause."

== Arrests and imprisonments ==
=== 2003 conviction for Hamas fundraising ===
In 2003, Salah and 14 other officials of the Northern Branch were arrested on charges of transferring money to Hamas. After eighteen months of imprisonment Salah entered a plea bargain. He admitted to charges of maintaining contact with a foreign agent and rendering service on behalf of illegal organizations. In exchange he only had to spend six more months in prison but would be banned from leaving Israel. Salah had previously described the charges against him as "fabricated". His lawyer—commenting on the plea bargain that Salah had agreed to—said: "Salah understood that Israel is not the place to seek justice for non-Jews".

=== 2007 spitting incident ===
In 2010, Salah was arrested for having spat in the face of an Israeli policeman while shouting at him: "You are racist murderers. You have no dignity" during a protest in 2007 in the Old City of Jerusalem. He denied those charges. The court initially sentenced him to nine months in prison but reduced the sentence to five months.

In a related case, the court acquitted Salah of charges of rioting and "involvement in an illegal gathering" in connection with the protest. A judge ruled that the charges—brought by police—were "inconsistent with witness testimony and video evidence produced by the defence".

When Salah was released from prison in December 2010, many Palestinian leaders in Israel visited and paid their respects to him. Over 30,000 of his supporters gathered to express their commitment to protecting al-Aqsa.

=== 2007 East Jerusalem blood libel sermon ===
In 2007, Salah held a sermon in a mosque in East Jerusalem following archaeological digs near the Mughrabi Gate, which leads up the Temple Mount and the al-Aqsa compound. During the sermon he said:

"We [Muslims] have never allowed ourselves to knead [the dough for] the bread that breaks the fast in the holy month of Ramadan with children's blood. Whoever wants a more thorough explanation, let him ask what used to happen to some children in Europe, whose blood was mixed in with the dough of the [Jewish] holy bread."

Israeli newspapers at the time wrote that Salah accused Jews of historically having used children's blood to bake bread, an antisemitic blood libel. The comments resurfaced in 2011, during Salah's detainment in Britain. He claimed that his intent wasn't to repeat a blood libel and that his use of the term "holy bread" showed that he weren't referring to Jews since there is no holy bread in Judaism. The pro-Palestinian British press monitoring organization Middle East Monitor produced a report titled The Sheikh Raed Affair, defending Salah. Other organizations disputed Salah's claims.

In 2013, Salah was tried for incitement to violence and racism for his 2007 sermon and convicted of incitement to violence but not to racism, and sentenced to eight months in prison in March 2014. Prosecutors appealed Salah's acquittal on the racism charge and the appeals court overturned the acquittal in November 2014, finding Salah guilty of incitement to racism for his "blood libel" comments. In March 2015, the court sentenced him to eleven months in prison. Salah appealed to the Supreme Court which in April 2016 reduced his sentence to nine months because: "the sermon happened a long time ago and Salah had not committed similar offenses since then".

Salah began serving his sentence in May 2016 and was placed in solitary confinement. An Israeli court in October rejected the Al Mezan Center for Human Rights's appeal to end his isolation. Salah began a hunger strike in November protesting the conditions under which he was held.

=== 2009 speech ===
In September 2009, protests that led to violent clashes between Israeli security forces and Muslim Palestinian protesters erupted over the status of the Temple Mount. On 2 October 2009, while the clashes were ongoing, Salah gave a speech which was branded incitement by the Israeli police, claiming that he had egged the protestors on. He was arrested on 6 October, but released a few hours later. However, he was banned from entering Jerusalem for 30 days as the court argued that his presence in Jerusalem: "could be inciting".

=== 2010 Gaza flotilla arrest ===
Salah was on board the MV Mavi Marmara, the lead ship of the 2010 Gaza Freedom Flotilla, which attempted to break Israel's blockade of the Gaza Strip. The ship was boarded in international waters by the Israeli Navy. This led to clashes with the activists during which Israeli commandos killed nine of them and injured dozens while seven commandos were injured. One Israeli police source claimed in The Jerusalem Post that Salah tried to provide cover for an activist who shot at an Israeli commando during the raid, but that the gunman had already been hit. Early Palestinian reports claimed that Salah had been critically injured by a gunshot wound to the head. Those reports were false and Salah had only suffered minor injuries.

Salah was taken to the Ela Prison in Be'er-Sheva to await a court hearing on their involvement with the flotilla. In June, Salah was released on a NIS 150,000 bail, but placed under house arrest and temporarily barred from leaving Israel. Hours after he was released, Salah gave a speech in Umm al-Fahm, claiming that Zionism: "which began in Turkey, would end in Turkey".

=== 2011 Allenby border crossing search ===
In April 2011, Salah and his wife were returning home after pilgrimage to Mecca. At the Allenby border crossing between Jordan and the West Bank they were detained by Israeli police. When a female police officer wanted to strip-search his wife, Salah protested loudly. He yelled at the police and demanded that they "treat his wife with respect". Other police officers restrained Salah but he broke free and tried to charge into the room where his wife was being searched.

Salah was convicted three years later of "interrupting" police officers and fined NIS 9,000 as well as given a two-year probation.

=== 2011 arrest in the United Kingdom ===
After entering the UK on 28 June 2011, Salah was detained the same day. He was due to attend a Palestine Solidarity Campaign meeting with Labour MPs Jeremy Corbyn, Yasmin Qureshi, and Richard Burden. He requested to be released on bail, while awaiting the outcome of court proceedings, despite the Home Office Secretary's decision to bar him from the country, was granted on 15 July and he was released three days later. The conditions for his release included wearing an electronic tag, observing a night-time curfew, reporting to immigration officials, and refraining from public-speaking.

Palestinians accused the Israeli government of being behind the arrest. In a statement, Home Secretary Theresa May said that she sought to have Salah deported for his extremist views.

A judicial review of the arrest of Salah took place on 30 September 2011 during which the court ruled that Salah was entitled to damages due to wrongful detention. In response, May sought to ban Salah. On 26 October, an immigration tribunal concluded that May had been justified in her position. The tribunal stated that it is: "satisfied that the appellant has engaged in the unacceptable behaviour of fostering hatred which might lead to intercommunity violence in the UK".

Photograph of Salah, May 2014

Salah successfully appealed the decision. The court ruled that there were no grounds for expelling him nor denying him freedom of speech and that he wasn't a danger to British society.

=== 2017 sermon and arrest ===
In August 2017, a month after Salah was released from prison, having served a nine-month sentence for his 2007 sermon in East Jerusalem, he was again arrested. This time on allegations of membership in an illegal organization (the Northern Branch) and of inciting to terror over a sermon he gave in July the same year in which he praised the "martyrs of Al-Aqsa" and those guarding it.

During the trial, Salah argued that his views were religious opinions and that he did not call for violence. His lawyer said that quoting from the Quran should be protected by freedom of speech, and that it is a matter of interpretation whether such quotes are Islamic discourse or incitement.

=== 2020 sentencing ===
On 10 February 2020, a court in Israel sentenced Salah to 28 months in prison for "inciting to terror". An appeals court upheld Salah's conviction and he began serving his sentence on 4 August.

While he was taken to prison, hundreds of his supporters gathered outside in a show of solidarity with their preacher, chanting: "Every Muslim and Arab in the world is proud of you — I do not respect the court's decision". Jamal Zahalka, former leader of the Arab-Israeli Balad party, said that Salah was the victim of a witch hunt: "this is another milestone in his political persecution. The [Northern Branch of the] Islamic Movement has been outlawed, now the right to speak is also outlawed".

On 13 December 2021, he was released from prison after having served 16 months of his sentence.

=== 2025 arrest and release ===
On 28 January 2025, Salah's home in Umm al-Fahm was raided by Israeli police and Salah was arrested. He was then released later that day following an interrogation.

His arrest drew condemnation from Umm al-Fahm Mayor, Dr. Samir Sobhi Mahameed, saying: "Sheikh Raed Salah is not a criminal, and the police forces must leave the city of Umm al-Fahm".

== See also ==
- Islamic Movement in Israel
  - Hamed Abu Daabas
  - Abdullah Nimar Darwish
- 2009 al-Aqsa clashes
- 2017 Temple Mount shooting

=== Lists ===
- List of Arab citizens of Israel
- List of Israeli Arab Muslims
