= Religious Peace Initiative =

Peace organization based in Israel

The Religious Peace Initiative is an effort founded by Rabbi Michael Melchior to promote dialogue between Israelis and Palestinians.

== History ==
The idea for this group originated from a meeting in 2002 chaired by Melchior along with Palestinian Sheikh Talal Sider, in Alexandria, Egypt, co-sponsored by the Mufti of Egypt, Grand Imam of al-Azhar Mosque, and Grand Sheikh of al-Azhar University, Muhammad Sayyid Tantawi; Archbishop of Canterbury George Carey; and Eliyahu Bakshi-Doron, Israel's Chief Rabbi.

This summit launched the Alexandria Process, and brought together religious leaders to adopt common principles aimed at mediating the conflicts in the region, and to seek common ground to promote resolution of the conflicts. Melchior is also a member of the Elijah Interfaith Institute Board of World Religious Leaders.

== Activities ==
One of the group's central organizing principles is to foster and promote dialogue between religious leaders of the two sides in this conflict, rather than between political leaders as was common with other initiatives. The Initiative consists of various individual groups from each community.

== See also ==
- Michael Melchior
