= Islamic Movement in Israel =

Islamist movement in Israel

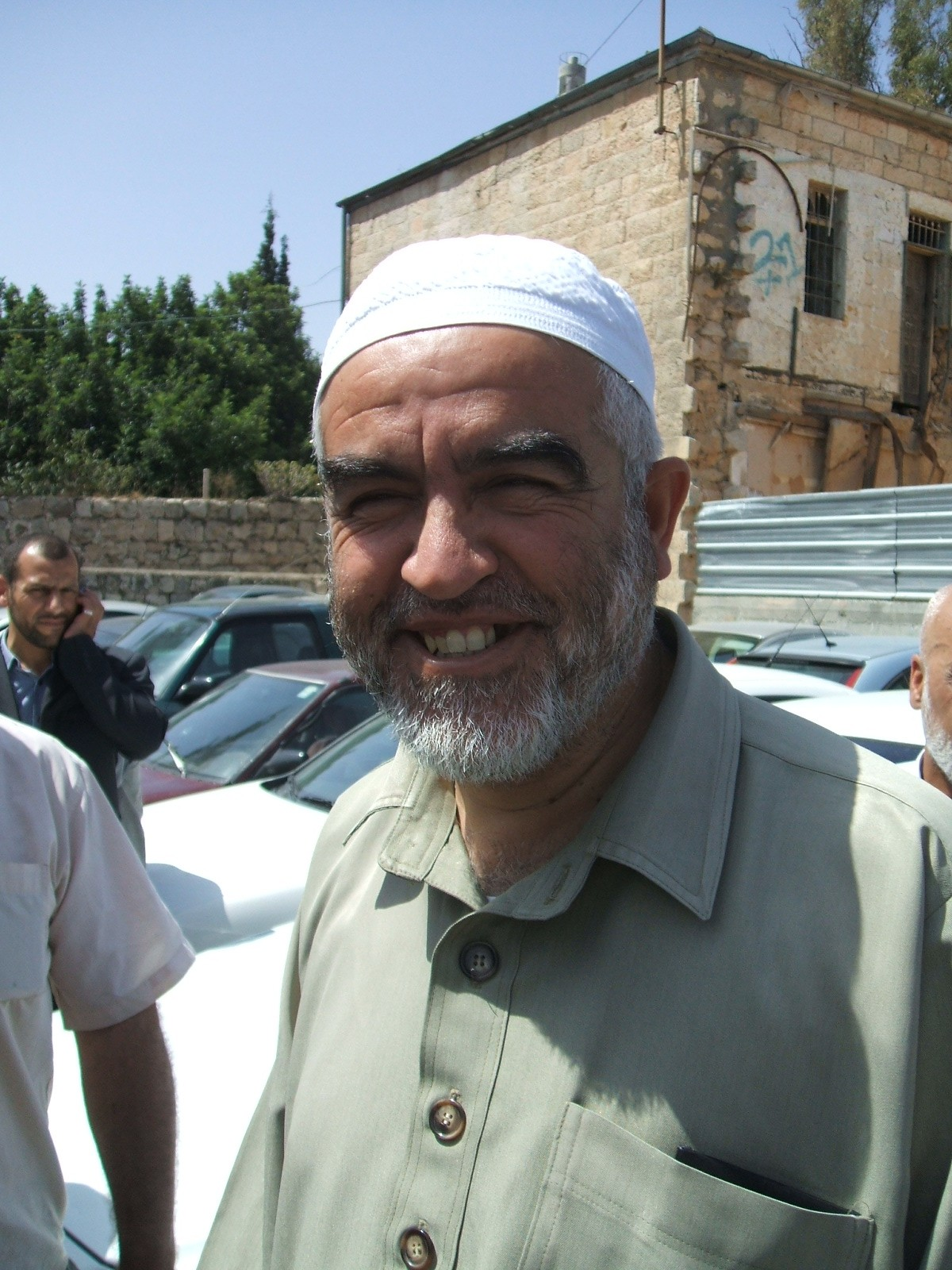
Raed Salah, the leader of the Northern Branch of the Islamic Movement in Israel

The Islamic Movement in Israel (Arabic: الحركة الإسلامية في إسرائيل; Hebrew: התנועה האסלאמית), also known as the Islamic Movement in '48 Palestine (Arabic: الحركة الإسلامية في فلسطين 48), is an Islamist movement that advocates for Islam in Israel, particularly among Arabs and Circassians.

The movement was established and led by Abdullah Nimar Darwish from 1971 to 1991, when he was replaced by Ibrahim Sarsur. In 1996 the movement decided to participate in the Israeli parliamentary elections for the first time in history. The decision was controversial. Opponents of the participation—based in Umm al-Fahm—branched off and were named the "Northern Branch" while the supporters—based in Kfar Qasim—were named the "Southern Branch". The Southern Branch is considered more moderate, and the Northern Branch more radical. The Northern Branch was banned by the Israeli government in November 2015 due to alleged ties with Hamas and the Muslim Brotherhood.

== History ==
=== Before the establishment of the Movement ===
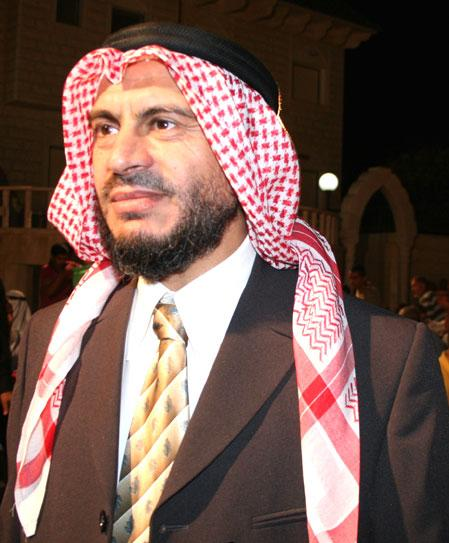
Hamed Abu Daabas, the leader of the Southern Branch of the Islamic Movement in Israel

The origins of the Islamic Movement can be traced back to the late years of Mandatory Palestine. Early organization began in the days of the 1936–1939 Arab revolt in Palestine, however, it only began gaining momentum after World War II as a result of cooperation between the Grand Mufti of Jerusalem Haj Amin al-Husseini and the Muslim Brotherhood, which is the parent movement of the Islamic Movement in Israel.

During the 1948 Palestine war, the movement cooperated with the Arab Higher Committee, much like the Egyptian branch of the Muslim Brotherhood, which cooperated with the Egyptian military. As a result, it suffered a major setback following the war as all of its institutions in the newly formed Jewish state were shut down. During the period of martial law on Israeli Arabs between 1949 and 1966, the movement was suppressed. The institutions that remained in the West Bank were put under the control of Jordanian authorities, who controlled the West Bank. Though a mild recovery took place in the Gaza Strip during the 1950s under Egyptian rule, there too its influence steadily declined until 1967.

The Six-Day War in 1967 caused renewed Palestinian support, both for the Palestine Liberation Organization, which had transformed from a puppet organization to a militant movement, and for Islamic Palestinian movements, among them the Islamic Movement in Israel. The newly created contact between Israeli Arabs and Palestinian Arabs in the territories occupied in 1967, in which the movement had managed to remain somewhat organized, also contributed to this resurgence. As part of the new contracts, members of the Islamic Movement in Israel were sent to study in religious institutions in the occupied territories. At the same time, the government of Saudi Arabia began to allow Muslim citizens of Israel to perform the Hajj to Mecca (all other holders of Israeli passports are barred from entry into that country).

=== Establishment to split ===
In 1971 the Islamic Movement in Israel was founded by Abdullah Nimar Darwish after he had completed his religious studies in Nablus. During the 1970s the movement largely focused on establishing welfare services for the Muslim community parallel to those of the state. Among its activities were provision of computers to schools, the establishment of an Islamic football league, marriage arrangement, charity, and more.

Parallel to this charity work, several of the heads of the movement, led by Darwish, established an organization called Osrat al-Jihad ("The Families of Jihad"), with the goal of establishing "an Arab Islamic state in Palestine". The heads of the organization were arrested in 1981 due to allegations that they: "... stockpiled weapons, burned fields, and murdered an Arab in Umm al-Fahm whom they suspected of collaborating with Israel" and as a result many members (including its leader, Darwish) served sentences of between a few months to four years in prison. In prison, the members decided to continue their work under Israeli law.

During the 1980s the movement experienced a rapid increase in support.

With the outbreak of the First Intifada, the movement established the "Islamic Relief Committee", whose purpose was to assist the needy in the occupied territories, particularly those harmed by Israel Defense Forces (IDF) operations.

In 1989 the movement decided to participate in elections for several Arab localities, in which it won control of six city councils and made substantial gains in others. The most significant victory was achieved by Sheikh Raed Salah in Umm al-Fahm, which subsequently became the center of the movement.

The Oslo I Accord caused a split in the movement whereby the Northern Branch opposed the agreement (similarly to the position of Hamas), and the Southern Branch supported the agreement. In 1994, the activity of the movement was felt in the Jewish public when Salah attempted to mediate between Israel and Hamas on the issue of the captured Israeli soldier Nakhshon Waxman.

In 1995, Shin Bet closed down the Islamic Relief Committee after it was found that the body had been granting financial assistance to the families of Hamas members. It was quickly reopened under the name "The Humanitarian Rescue Committee", whose objectives were almost identical. In 1997, the committee was closed a second time (though only for a short period), and subsequently restrictions were placed upon it.

=== Two separated branches ===
In 1996 the movement decided to run for the Knesset, following three previous rejections of the idea. The decision cemented the divisions between the Northern and Southern branches of the movement, the former, led by Raed Salah, arguing that elections should be boycotted. The Southern Branch, led by Sheikh Ibrahim Sarsur, ran for elections sometimes together with the Arab Democratic Party or in an Arab Joint List, and sometimes independently under the name United Arab List; in 2021 it joined the Israeli government coalition.

Ahead of Ariel Sharon's visit at the Temple Mount, the movement stirred agitation among Israeli Arabs. After the visit, both branches of the movement continued to incite their followers to violence in order to "protect the mountain". According to the Or Commission, these calls for violence contributed significantly to the heated spirits of the Arab public and caused a severe worsening in the October 2000 events.

In 2002 the Humanitarian Rescue Committee was shut down, and after a short period "The Organization of the Humanitarian Rescue Committee" was established in its stead. In the same year Eli Yishai, then Interior Minister, decided to close the newspaper of the northern branch, though the decision was never implemented.

In 2003 the heads of the Northern Branch of the movement were arrested under suspicion of aiding Hamas, but two-thirds were released almost immediately. The remaining suspects were detained, but most were released during 2005 after signing a plea bargain. Both the arrests and the plea bargain stirred opposition from both the left wing and right wing camps of Israeli politics. The main offenses of which those detained were accused were financial offenses such as tax evasion, but also contact with a foreign agent and contact with a terrorist group. Ultimately, only the economic offenses were proved true.

These two events, as well as the history of incitement by the movement, have been defining factors in the group's image among the Jewish public, most of which views it as a terrorist organization, and there have been many calls to ban the movement.

In 2007, in response to Iranian President Mahmoud Ahmadinejad's comments on the Holocaust, the Islamic Movement (Southern Branch) leader Abdullah Nimr Darwish "slammed" the Holocaust denial. He also said that antisemitic texts in the Muslim world were contrary to the true spirit of Islam. At the same time, he criticized Israel for not supporting a Saudi peace initiative involving Hamas and Fatah.

In 2012 the Murabitat and Mourabitoun were founded by the Northern Branch after fear arose that the status quo at the Temple Mount would be changed by Israel.

=== Banning of the Northern Branch ===
On 9 September 2015, Israel banned both the Murabitat and the Mourabitoun stating they were a source of incitement and violence. Defense Minister Moshe Ya'alon said in a statement that they were the: "main cause in the creation of tension and violence on the Temple Mount (al-Aqsa compound) specifically and Jerusalem in general."

In November 2015 the Israeli Security Cabinet, led by Prime Minister Benjamin Netanyahu, outlawed the Northern Branch, based on evidence gathered by the Israel Police and the Israeli internal security agency—Shin Bet—which allegedly showed that the movement had close connections with Hamas and the Muslim Brotherhood. The organization's suspected ties with Hamas were a major catalyst for the decision; the northern branch received funding from Hamas-affiliated groups, and collaborated with Hamas in its institutional activities.

The chief of Shin Bet, Yoram Cohen, objected to the Cabinet's decision to outlaw the Northern Branch. According to him, there was no evidence linking it to terror attacks and the decision would be seen as a declaration of war on Israel's Muslim community and an assault on the political rights of its Palestinian minority. Banning the movement would, according to Cohen do: "more harm than good".

As a consequence of the decision to outlaw the Northern Branch, police raided more than a dozen of its offices, seized computers, files, and funds, and questioned several members, including Salah and his deputy. The Israeli government also froze the northern branch's bank accounts and ordered 17 organizations affiliated with the branch to close.

Israeli law professor Aeyal Gross, writing for the left-wing newspaper Haaretz, claimed that the outlawing criminalized thousands of citizens. Anyone who acted on the Northern Branch's behalf, held a job in it, attended one of its meetings or possessed one of its books, periodicals or fliers or any other publication could be prosecuted and sentenced up to ten years in prison.

=== Foiled bombing attack ===
On 27 December 2016 Shin Bet revealed that it had indicted two men suspected for planning a bombing attack in retribution for the outlawing of the Northern Branch. A third man was indicted in 2017. Shin Bet claimed that they were plotting to attack Israeli soldiers at three possible locations in the Negev, Dimona, Arad, or the Nevatim Airbase.

== Literature ==
- Rosmer, Tilde (2022). The Islamic Movement in Israel. Austin (Tex.): University of Texas press. ISBN 978-1-4773-2354-0.

== See also ==
- History of Islamism
- Islam in Israel
- Arab citizens of Israel
- Abdullah Nimar Darwish
- Raed Salah
- Hamed Abu Daabas
- Shura council (Islamic Movement)
