= Meron =

Meron may refer to:

== People ==
- Meron (surname), including a list of people with the name
- Meron Amanuel (born 1990), Eritrean cyclist
- Meron Benvenisti (1934–2020), Israeli political scientist
- Meron Getnet (fl. from 2013), Ethiopian actress, journalist and political activist
- Meron Gribetz (fl. from 2013), Israeli technology entrepreneur
- Meron Mazur (born 1962), Ukrainian Catholic bishop
- Meron Mendel (born 1976), Israeli-German social scientist, academic, and writer
- Meron Russom (born 1987), Eritrean cyclist
- Meron Teshome (born 1992), Eritrean cyclist

== Other uses ==
- Meron (physics) or half-instanton, a Euclidean space-time solution of the Yang–Mills field equations
- Meron, Israel, a town
  - Mount Meron, a mountain
  - Meiron, a former Palestinian settlement near present-day Meron
- Meron School, in Tel Aviv, Israel
- Meron, part of an insect's leg in insect morphology

== See also ==
- Meiron
