= Kfar Qassem Football Stadium =

Football stadium in Kfar Qasim, Israel

Kfar Qassem Municipal Stadium
- איצטדיון עירוני כפר קאסם
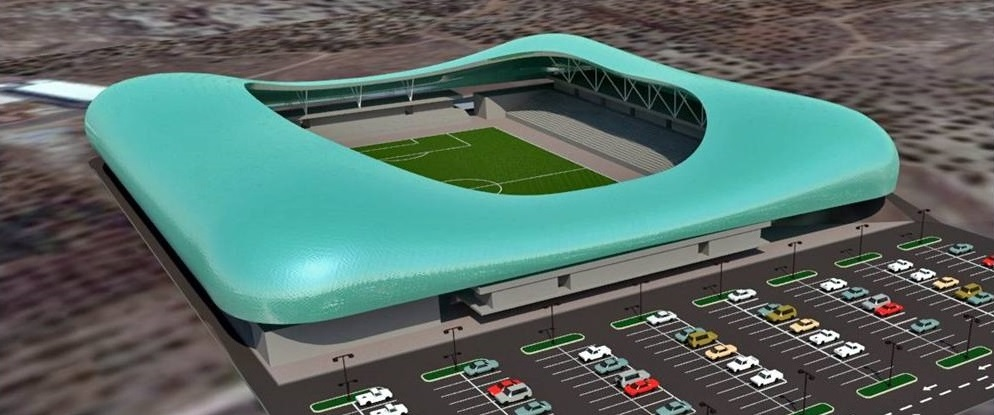
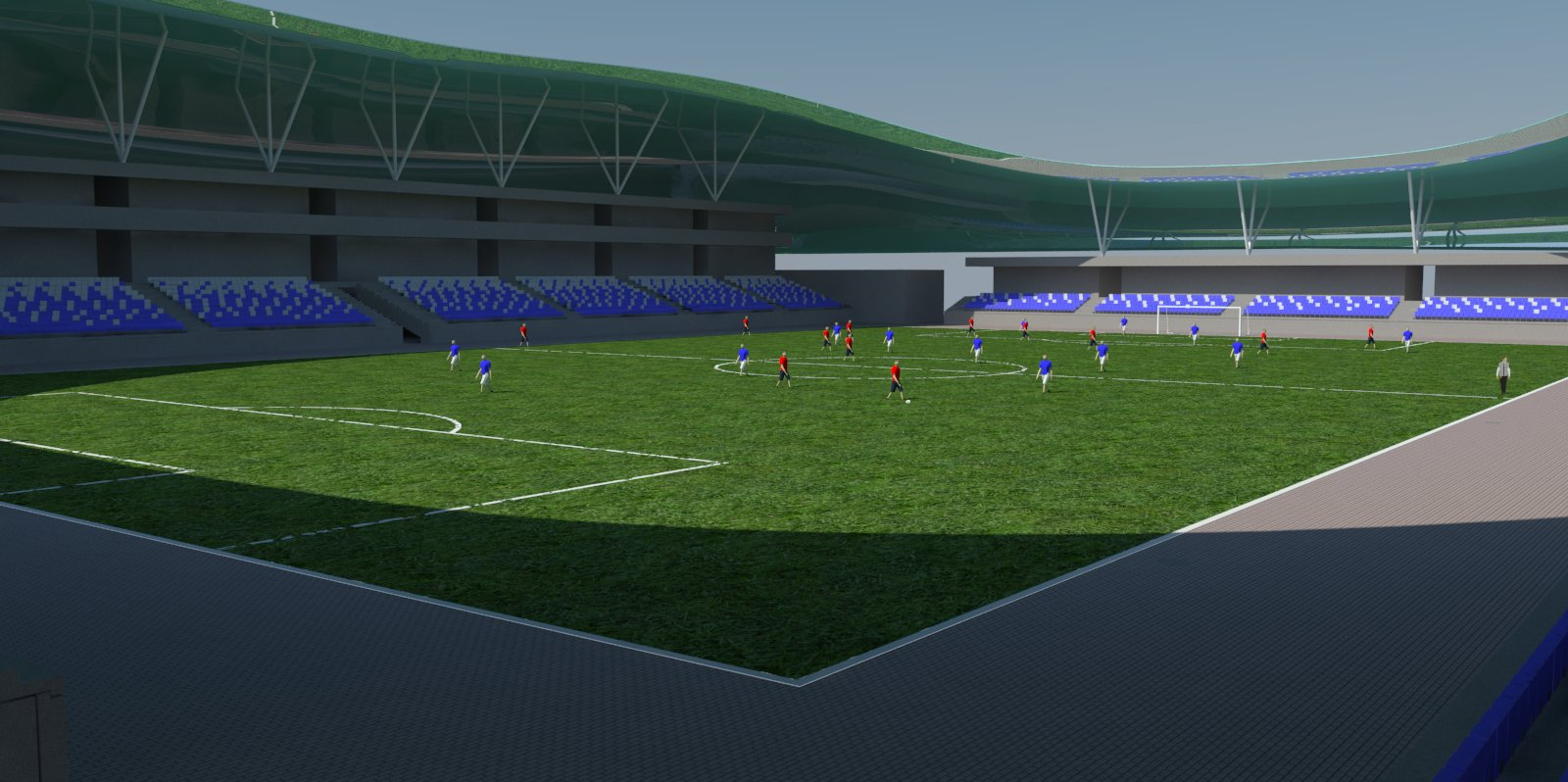
- Kfar Qassem Municipal Stadium
- Interactive map of Kfar Qassem Municipal Stadium
- Full name: Kfar Qassem Municipal Football Stadium
- Location: Kfar Qasim, Israel
- Coordinates: 32°7′35.1″N 34°57′56.5″E
- Owner: Municipality of Kfar Qasim
- Operator: Municipality of Kfar Qasim
- Capacity: 8,000
- Surface: Grass

Construction
- Groundbreaking: October 2016
- Opened: under construction
- Cost: NIS 50,000,000
- Architect: Moti Bodek

Tenant
- F.C. Kafr Qasim

Kfar Qassem Municipal Stadium (כַּפְר קָסִם, כפר קאסם), is a football stadium currently being built in Kfar Qasim for F.C. Kafr Qasim, the football team of the town. Once completed in 2020, the new stadium will include 8,000 seats, along with all the Facilities that required by the regulations. Kfar Qassem Municipal Football Stadium - Hashalom Stadium - is located in the northern Part of Kfar Qassem, and designed by the architect Moti Bodek. The first phase will include the western tribune, the grass surface, the lighting system, and the Parking lot. The second phase will include the completion of the facilities structure and the roof on the west side, and The third phase will include the construction of the eastern tribune including the roof. In order to complete the entire stadium will need a budget of 50 million NIS.

== See also ==
- High-tech architecture
