= Tiberias Football Stadium =

Football stadium currently being built in Tiberias

Tiberias Municipal Stadium
- איצטדיון עירוני טבריה
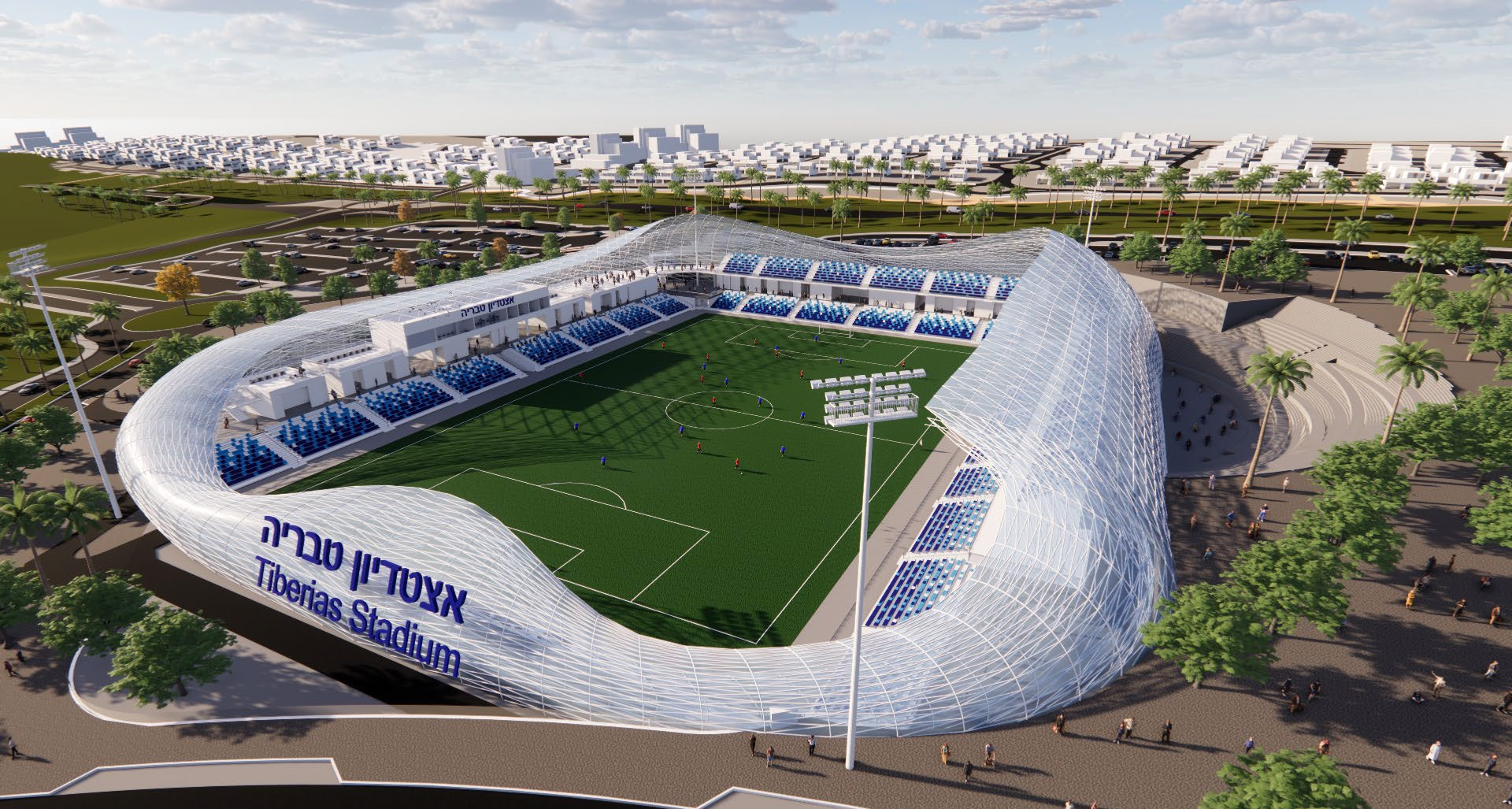
- Tiberias Municipal Stadium
- Interactive map of Tiberias Municipal Stadium
- Full name: Tiberias Municipal Football Stadium
- Location: Tiberias, Israel
- Coordinates: 32°46′4.44″N 35°30′50.94″E
- Owner: Municipality of Tiberias
- Operator: Municipality of Tiberias
- Capacity: 7,554
- Surface: Grass

Construction
- Groundbreaking: February 2015
- Opened: under construction
- Cost: NIS 40,000,000
- Architect: Moti Bodek

Tenant
- Ironi Tiberias F.C.

Tiberias Municipal Stadium (Hebrew: האצטדיון העירוני של טבריה, romanized: HaItztadion HaIroni Shel Tverya), is a football stadium currently being built in Tiberias for Ironi Tiberias F.C., the football team of the town, and will replace the old stadium located downtown. Once completed, the new stadium will include 7,554 seats. It is located at the southern entrance to the city, near the junction of Poriya Hospital as a part of a sports complex also including a multi-purpose 2,500-seat sports hall, a training ground and a swimming pool. As of late 2020, the project was frozen due to lack of funds.

== Gallery ==
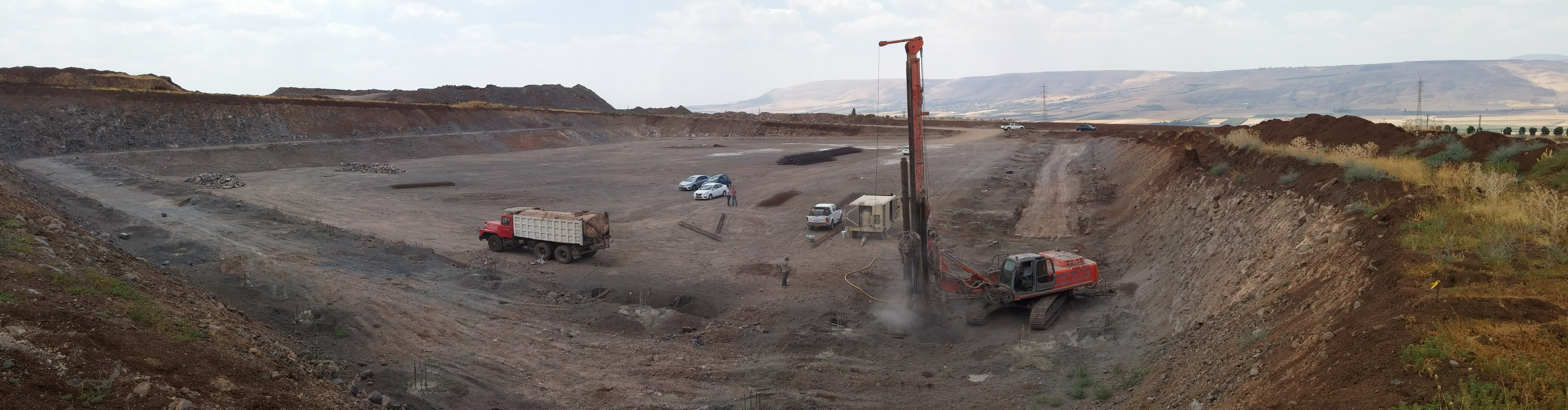
Excavation and foundation July 2016

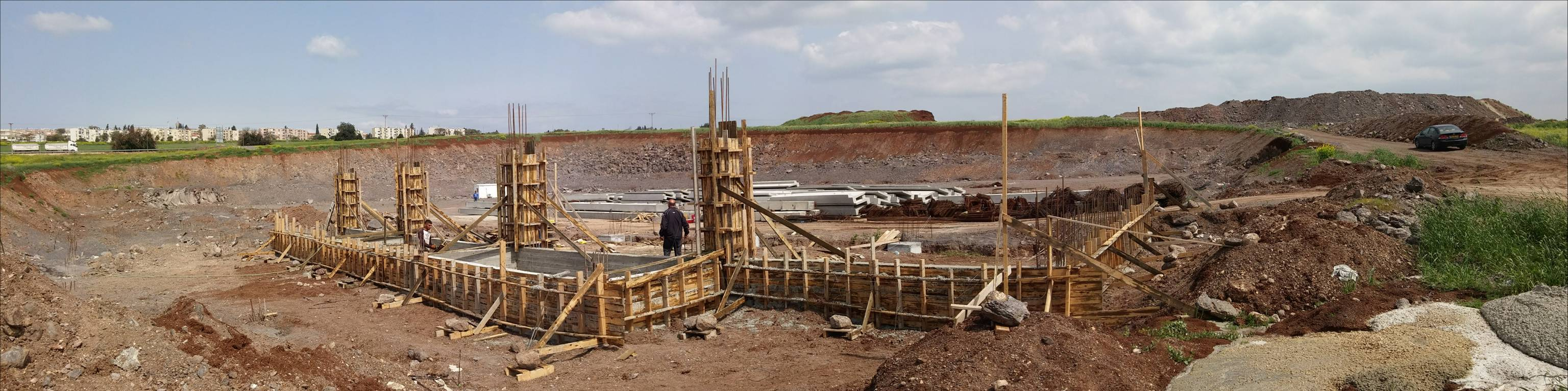
Infrastructure for the stands March 2017

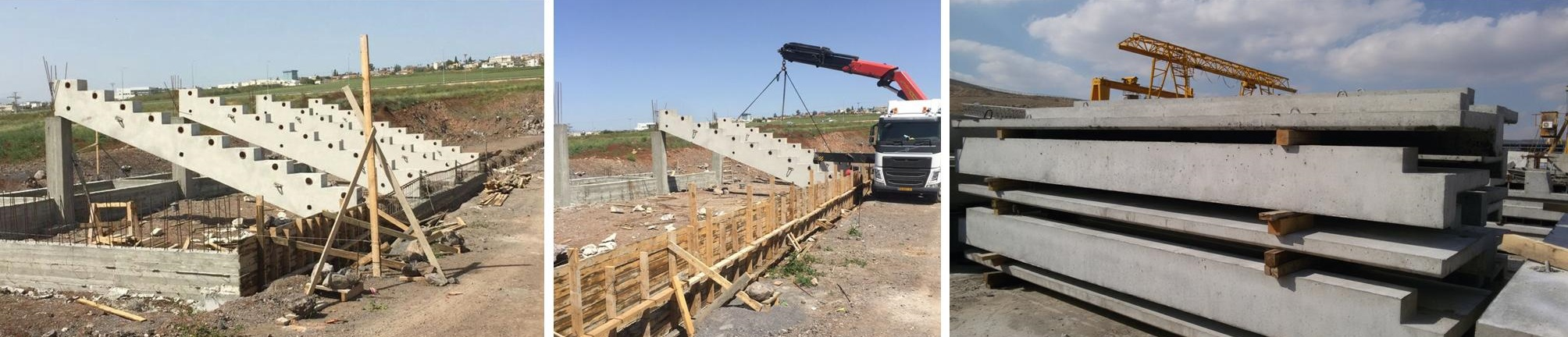
Assembling the stands April 2017

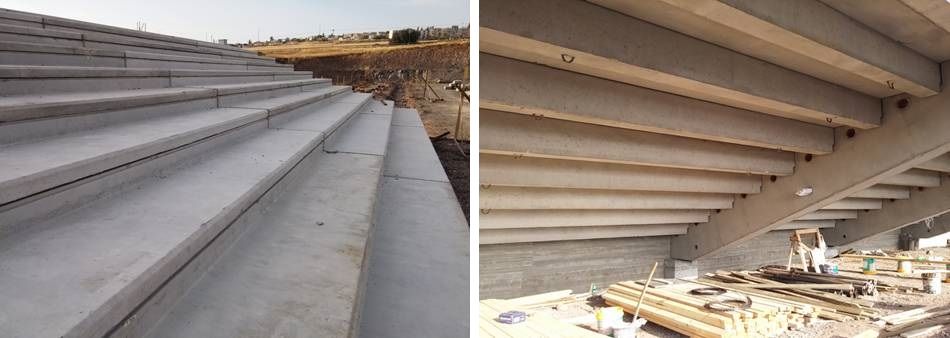
Assembling the stands May 2017

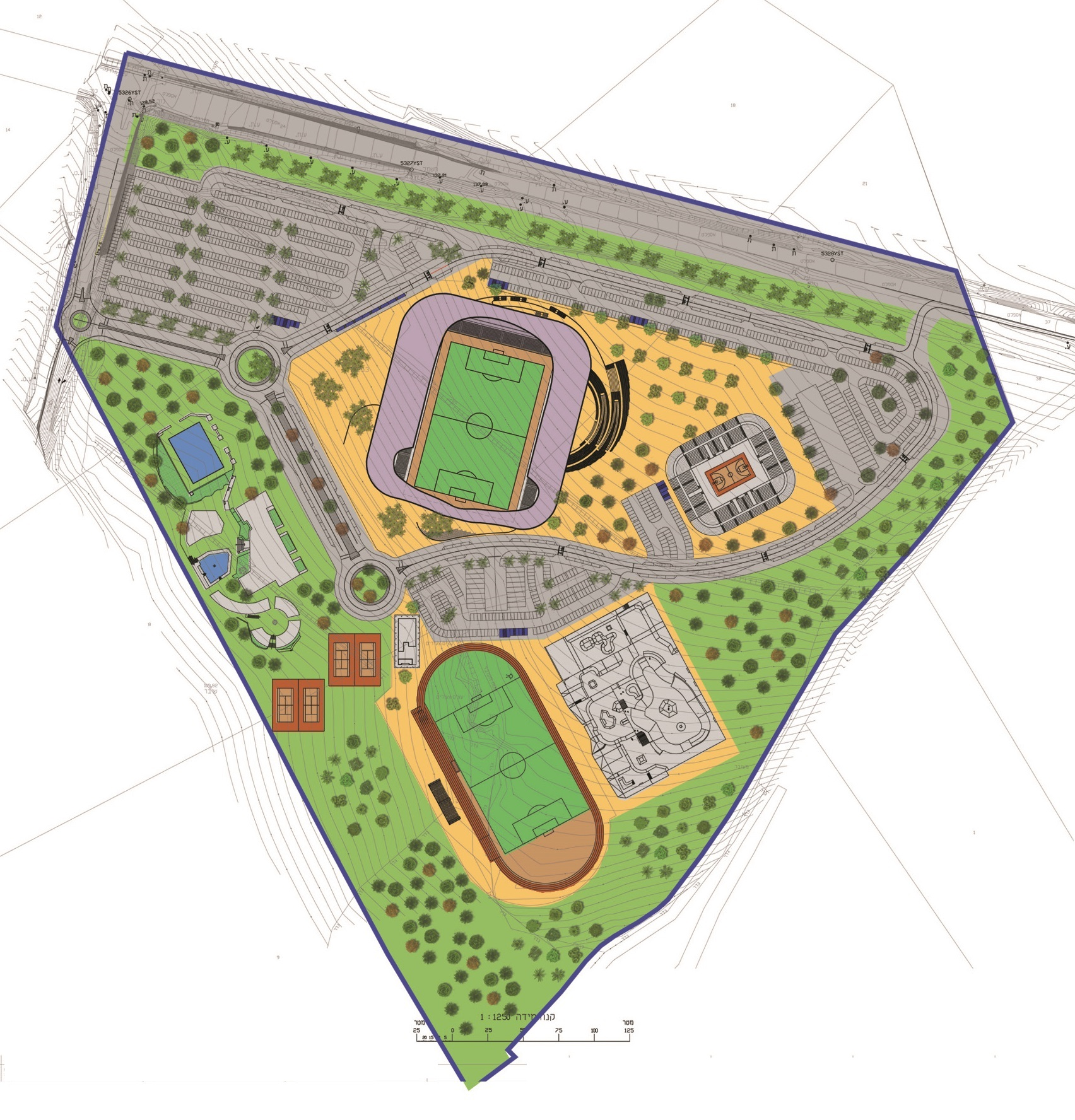
Campus general plan

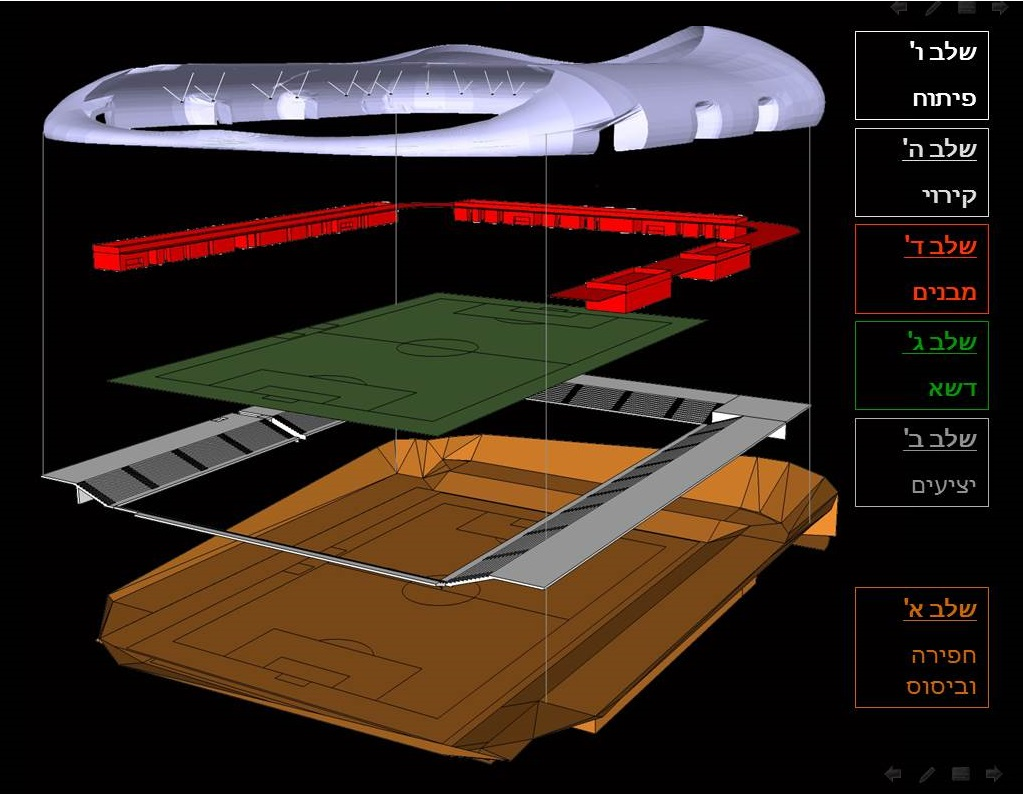
Construction Stages

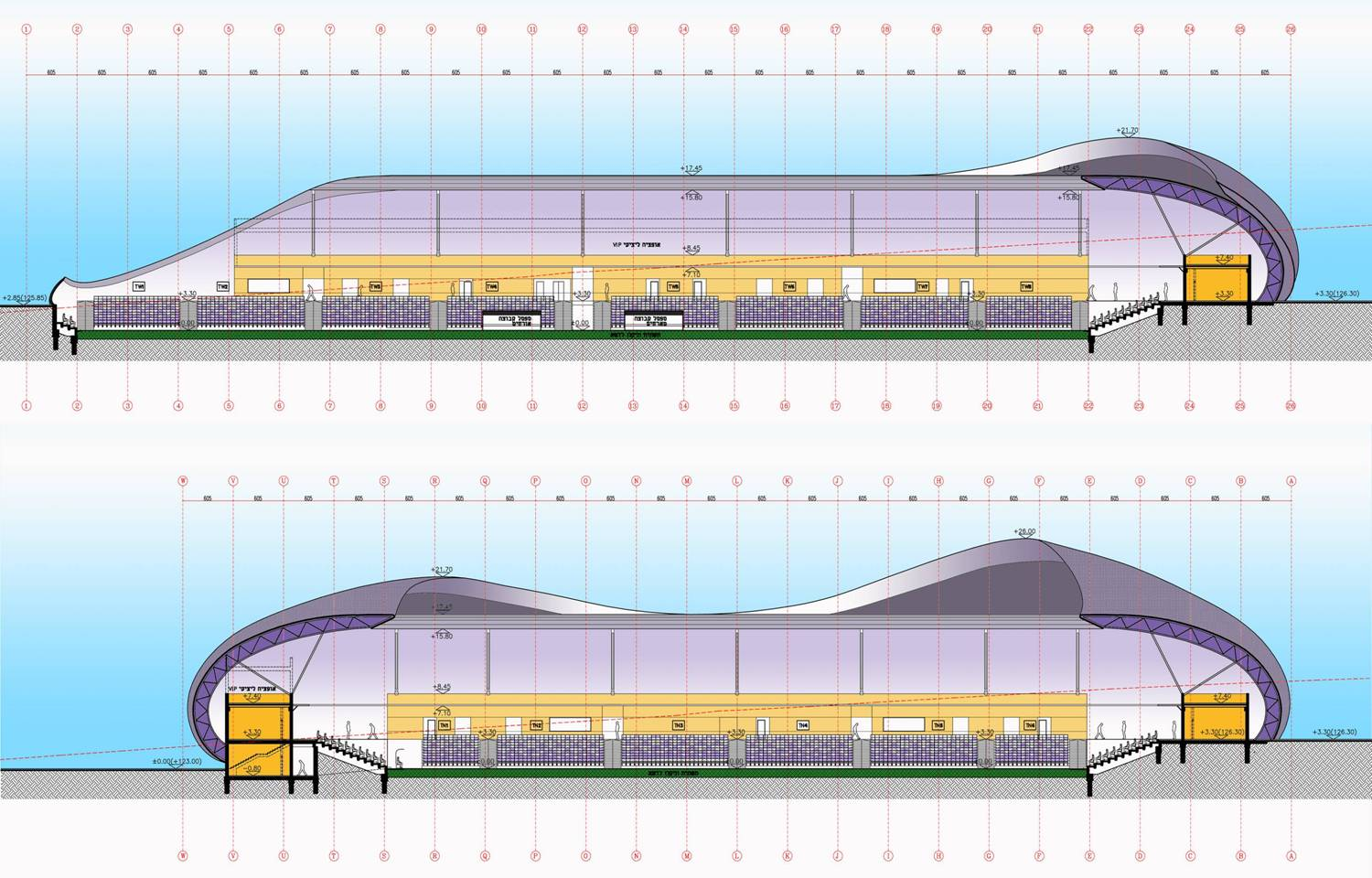
Sections

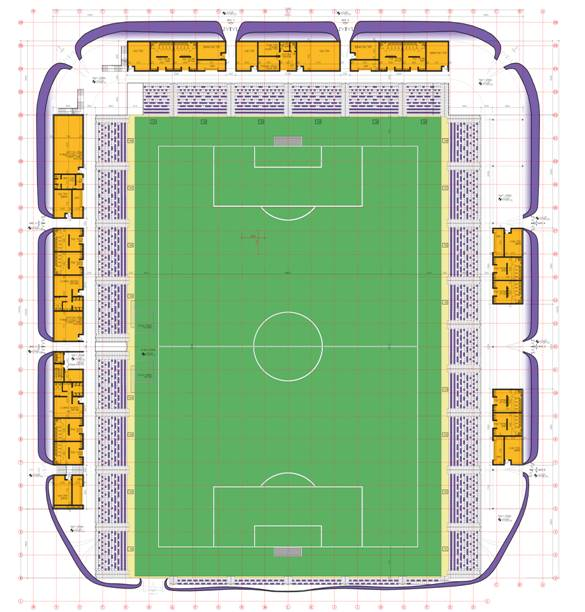
Stadium plan

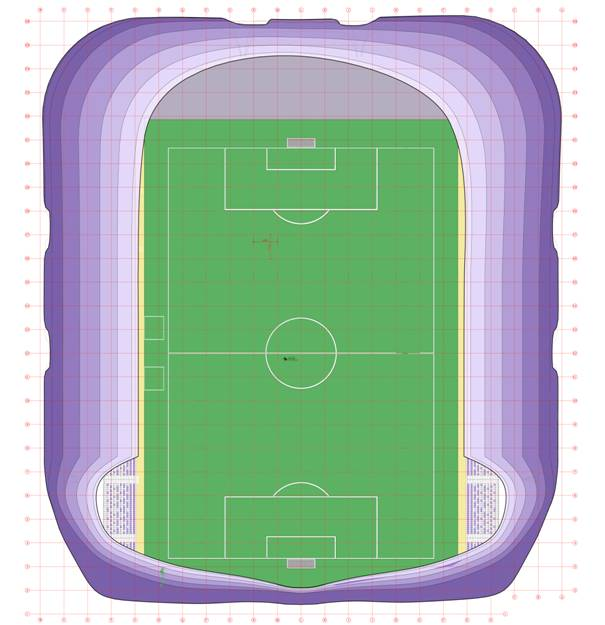
Envelope plan

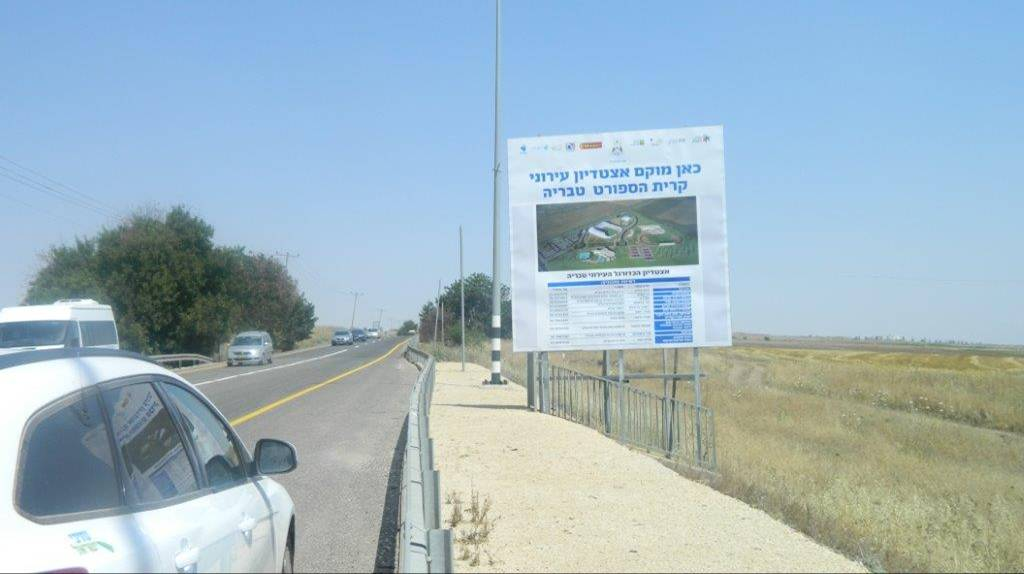
Stadium site June 2015

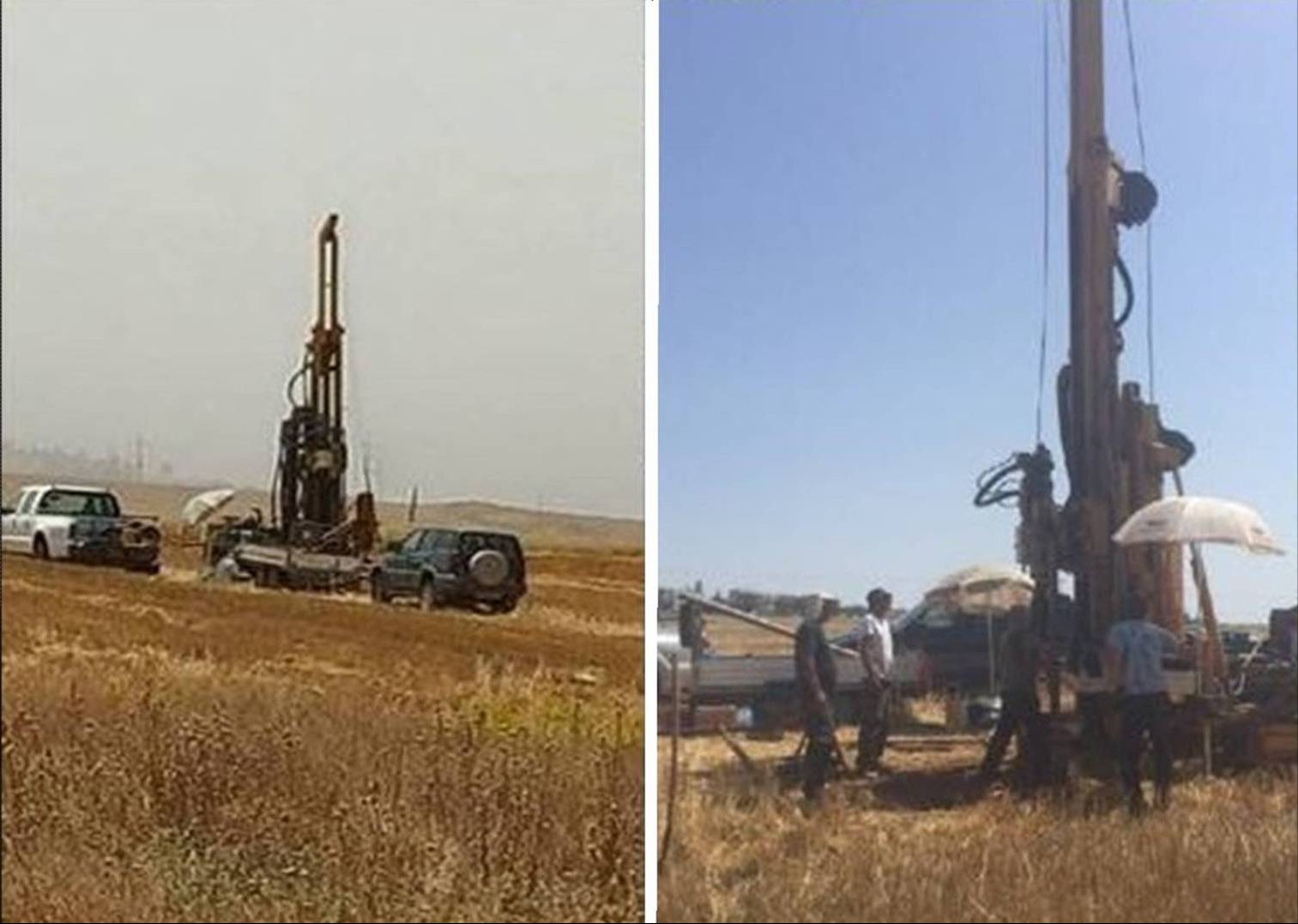
Soil drilling June 2015

== See also ==
- High-tech architecture
