= Moti Bodek =

Israeli architect

Prof. Moti Bodek
- מוטי בודק
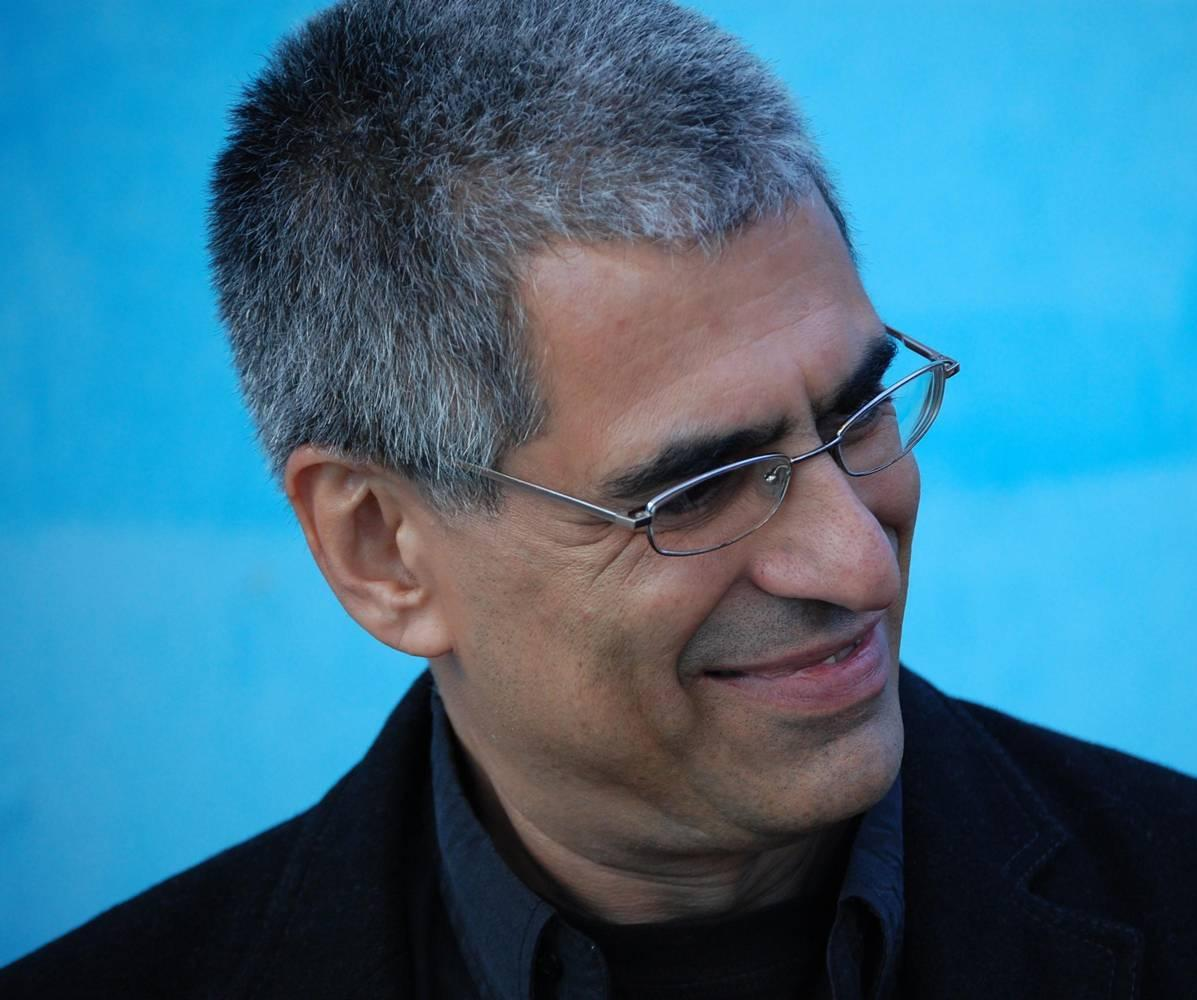
- Born: 1961 (age 64–65); Haifa, Israel
- Occupation: Architect
- Practice: Bodek Architects Ltd. Tel Aviv
- Buildings: Eilat Sports Center, Bikur Holim Hospital at Jerusalem, Tiberias Football Stadium

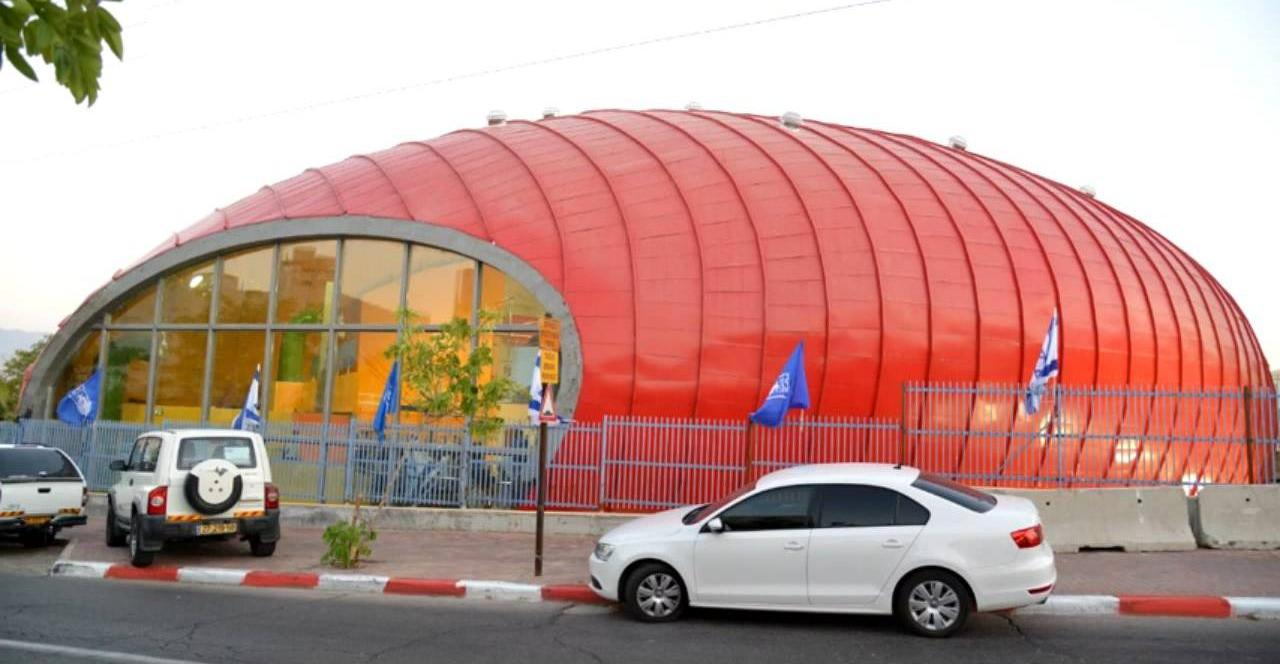
Eilat Sports Center

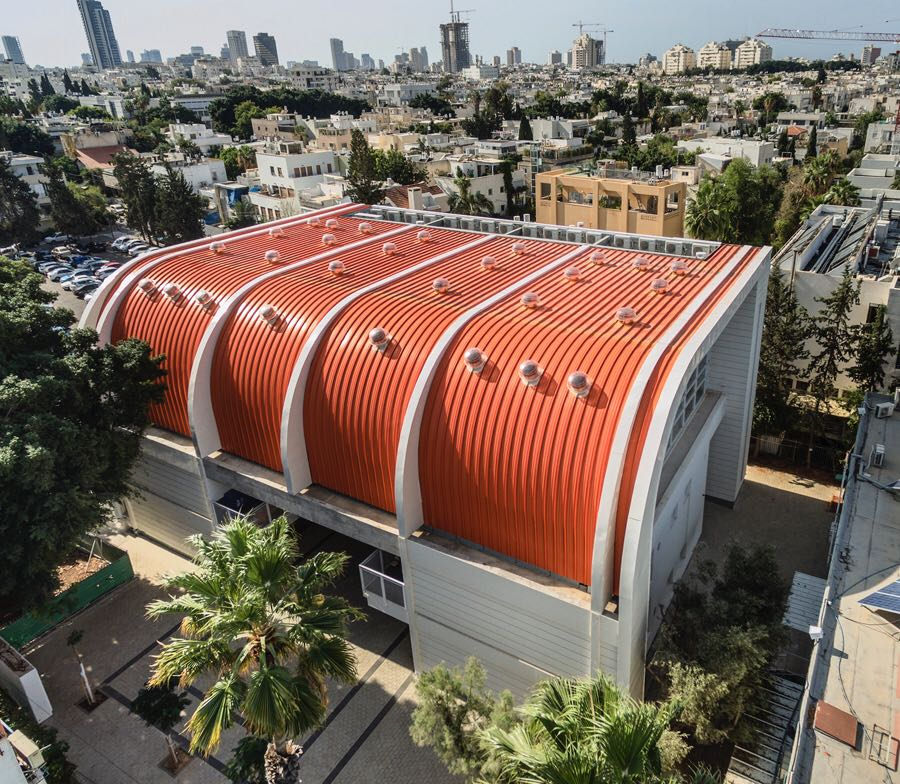
Meron School, designed by Moti Bodek and Dana Oberson

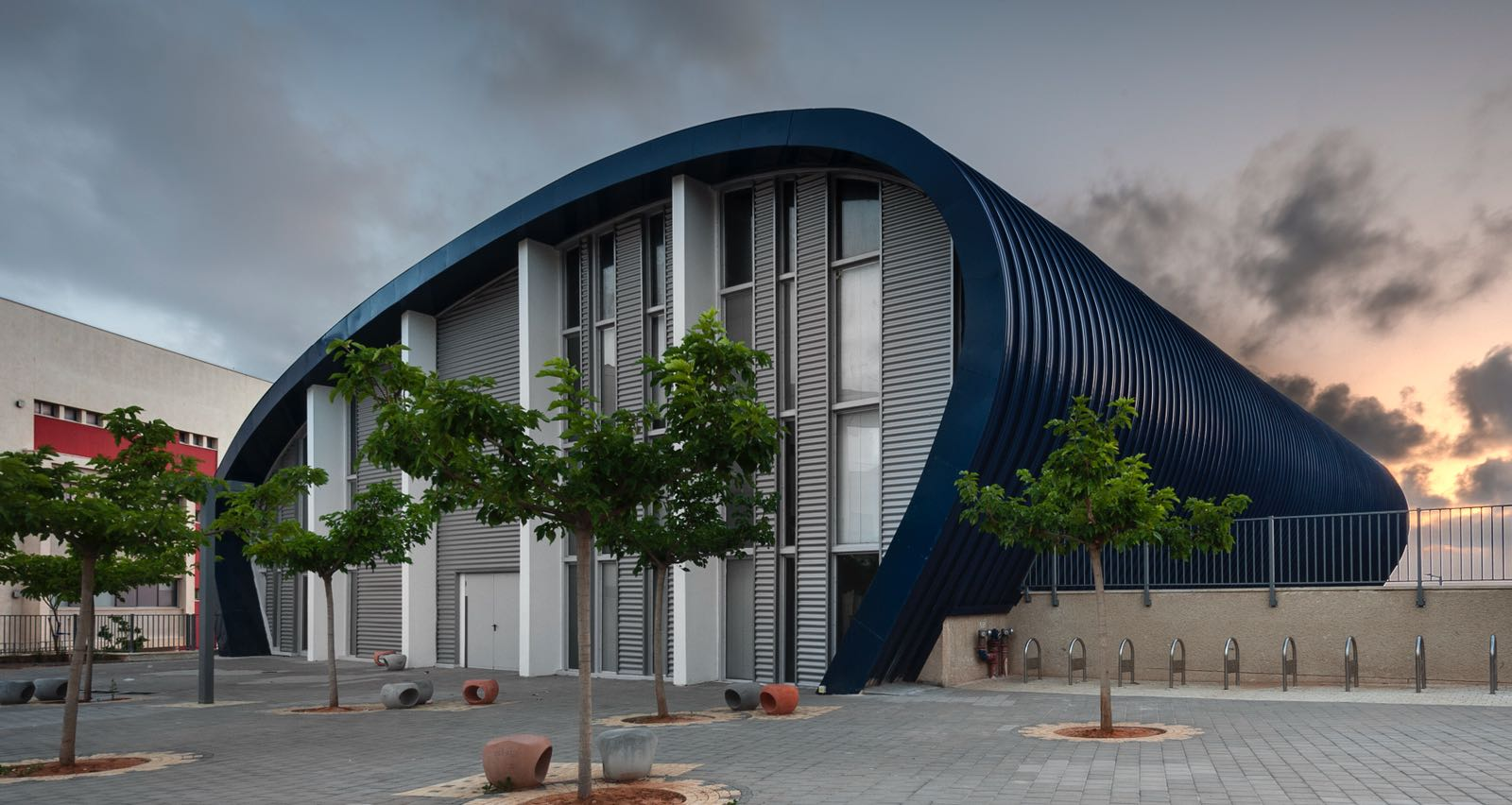
Nofei Yam Sports Center at Tel Aviv, designed by Moti Bodek and Dana Oberson

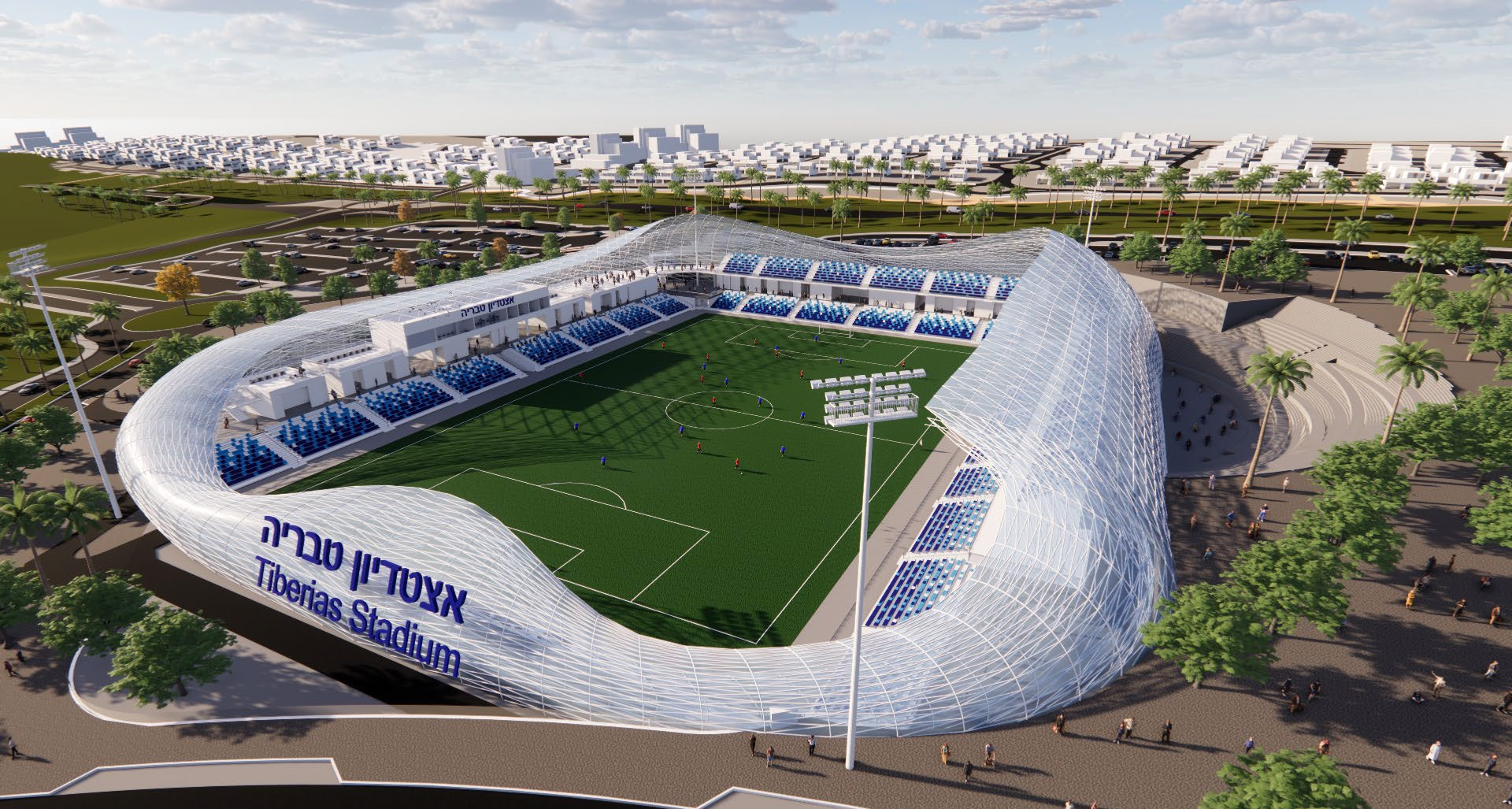
Tiberias Football Stadium (under construction)

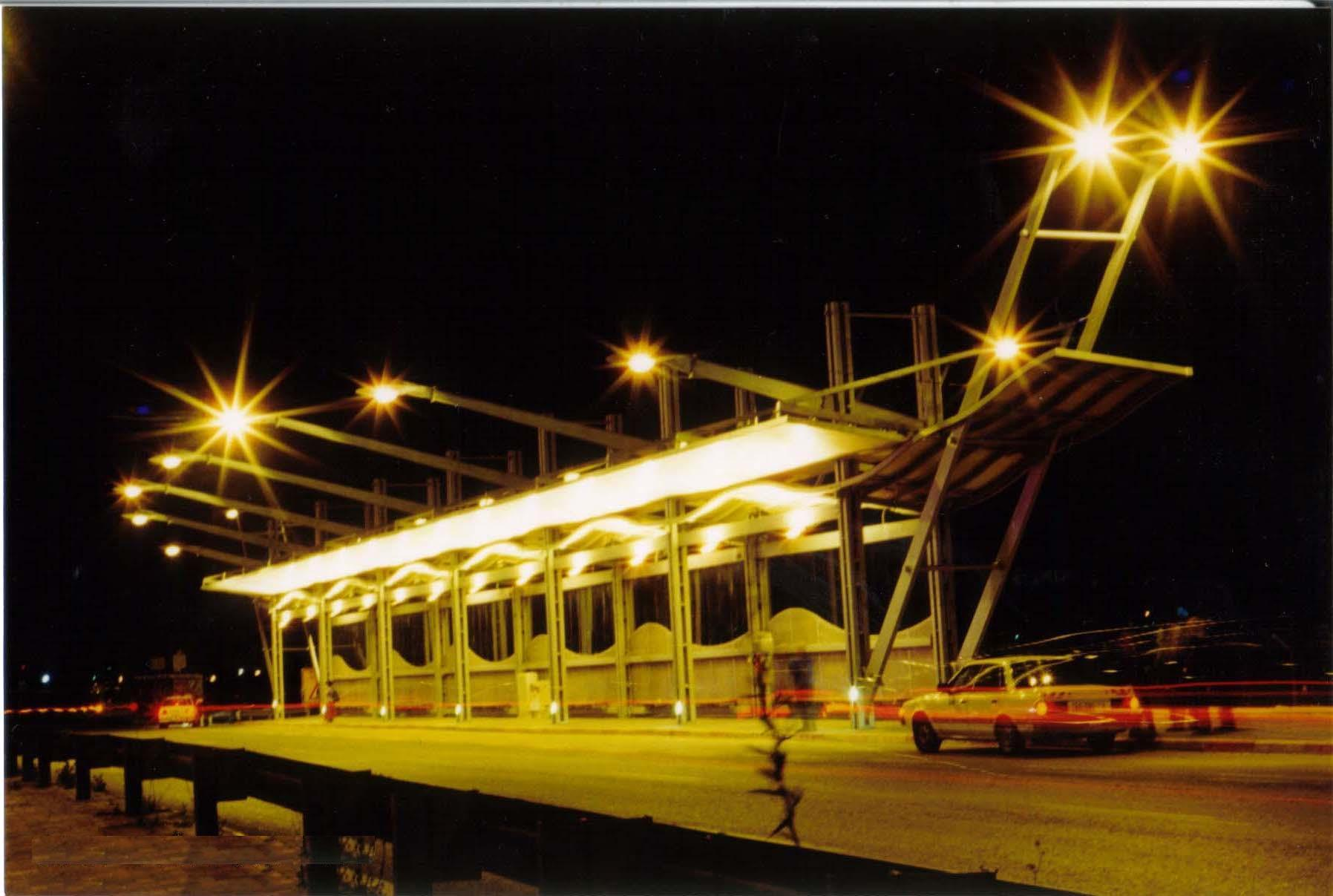
Bus stops on Highway 44 (Israel) near Holon

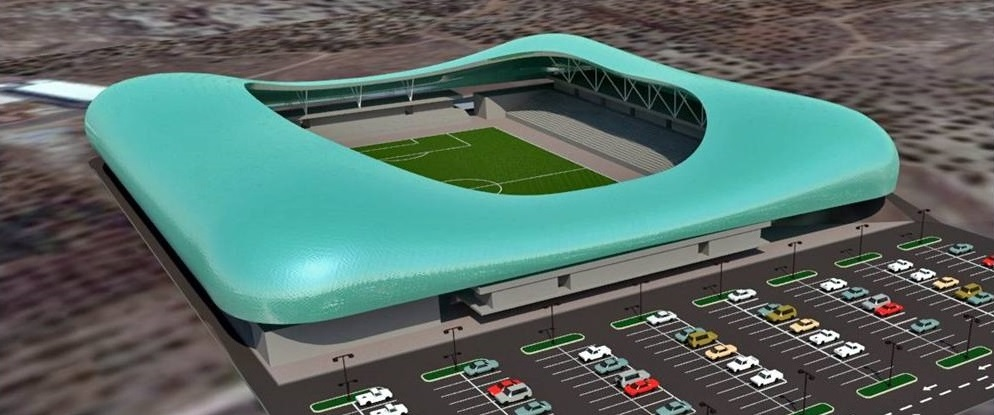
Kfar Qassem Football Stadium (under construction)

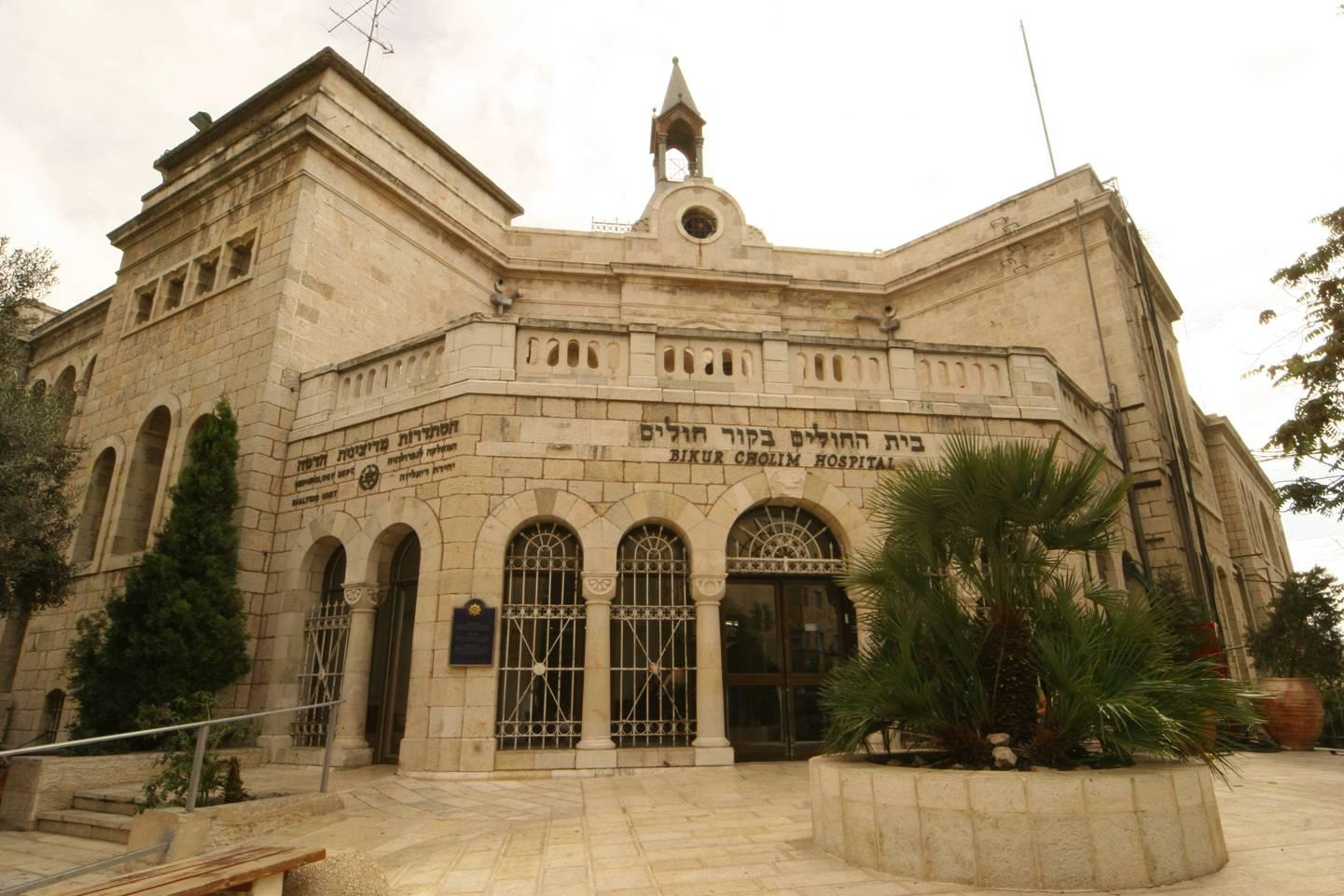
Bikur Holim Hospital, Jerusalem

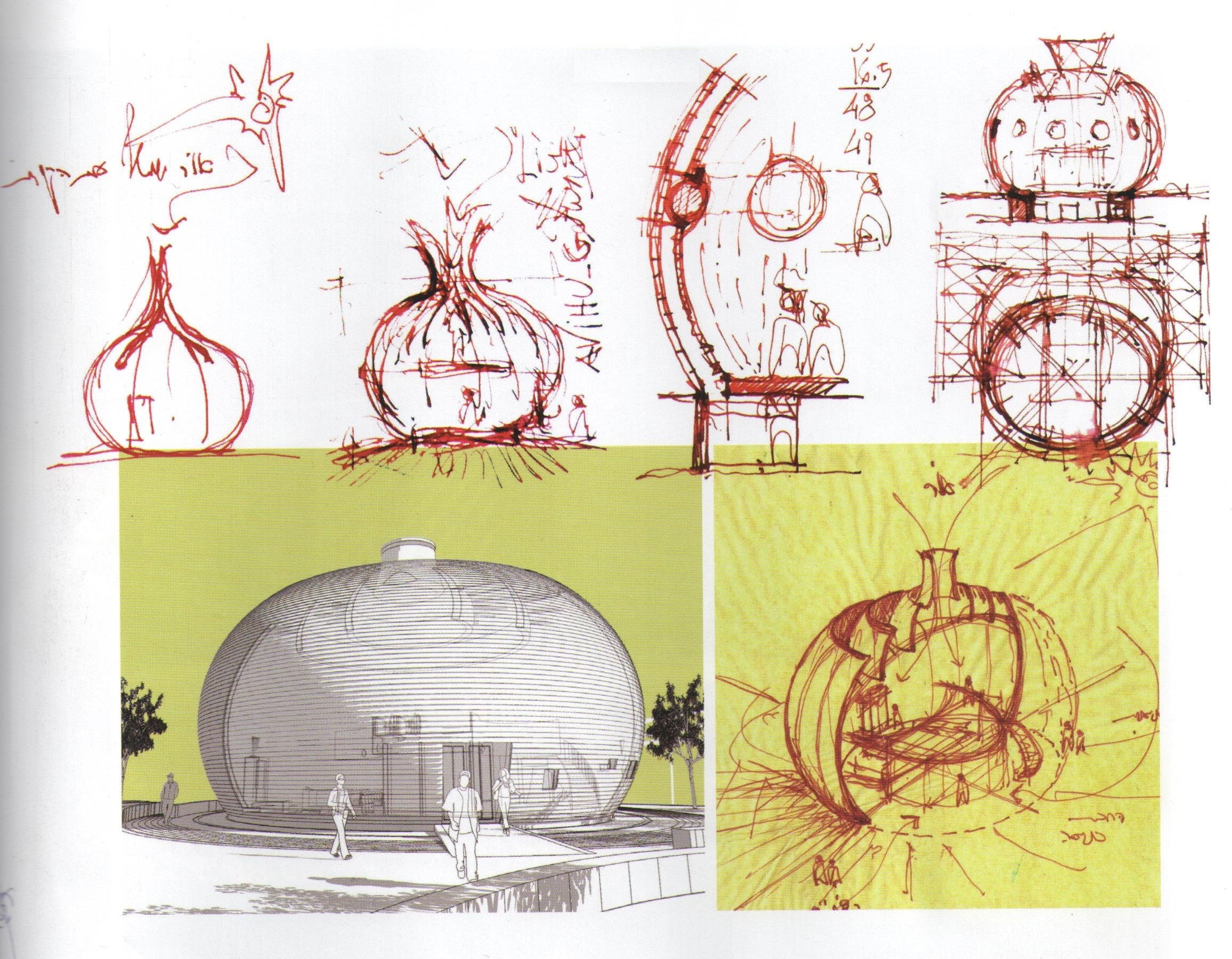
Be'er Ganim Synagogue early sketches

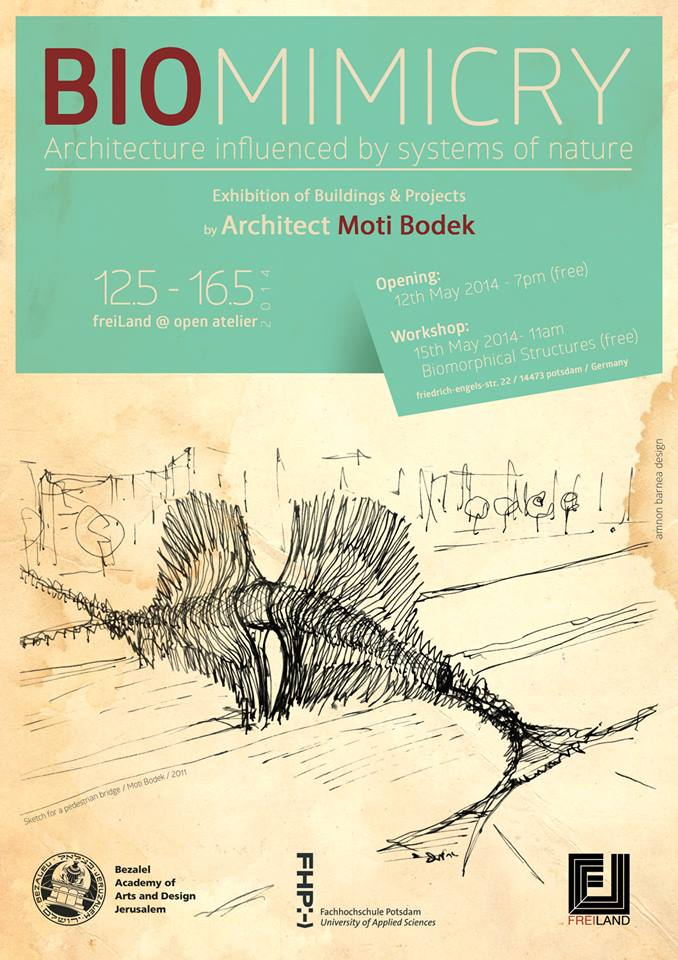
Biomimicry - Architecture influenced by systems of nature. Exhibition of Buildings & Projects, Potsdam Germany, May 2014

Moti Bodek (Hebrew: מוטי בודק; born 1961) is an Israeli architect. He is the CEO of Bodek Architects based in Tel Aviv and a Professor of Architecture at Bezalel Academy of Art and Design, Jerusalem & at Tel Aviv University.

== Biography ==
Moti Bodek was born and grew up in Haifa. He served in the Israeli security forces from 1979 to 1985. In 1989 he graduated with honors from the department of Environmental Design at Bezalel Academy of Art and Design Jerusalem, and in 1990 he earned his B.Arch. degree from the Faculty of Architecture in the Technion, Haifa.

From 1987 to 1993 Bodek worked at the Avraham Yasky architectural company at Tel Aviv, while also in 1990 founding his own firm, Bodek Architects.

In 1991 he began teaching at Bezalel, and in 1995 he received his M.P.A degree from Clark University, Massachusetts, United States.

From 2001 to 2004, Bodek served as deputy head of the Architecture Department at Ariel University.

Currently he is a Professor of Architecture and the Head of Lecturers Organization at Bezalel Academy of Art and Design.

Bodek was one of the founders of staff organization boards at higher education institutions, and also served as Deputy Chairman.

Bodek engaged in the research, design and construction of projects based on the discipline of biomimicry (imitation of life).

== Selected projects ==
- Eilat Sports Center
- Tiberias Football Stadium
- Meron School, Tel Aviv
- Kfar Qassem Football Stadium
- Tel Aviv University Sports Centre
- New neighborhood near Beersheba River Park
- Two pedestrian bridges, Ashdod
- Sea Sports Centre & Sailing Club Eilat
- Synagogue, Be'er Ganim near Ashkelon
- Bikur Holim Hospital, Jerusalem
- The Russian Embassy house on Rothschild Boulevard, Tel Aviv
- Bus stops on Highway 44 (Israel)
- Tel Aviv Central Bus Station

== Exhibitions ==
- Biomimicry - Architecture influenced by systems of nature, Exhibition of Buildings & Projects by Architect Moti Bodek. International Week, FHP University of Applied Sciences, freiLand Potsdam Germany. 12-16 May 2014.
- BIO-DESIGN: HYBRID FABRICTIONSׂ, Group Exhibition. Master's Program in Integrated Design, Research Gallery, Design Faculty, HIT Holon Institute of Technology, Israel. 28 April-19 May 2015
- La Biennale di Venezia, The 15th International Architecture Exhibition Venice, Italy, May 28th to November 27th 2016.

== See also ==
- Architecture of Israel
