= Eilat Sports Center =

Sports arena in Eilat, Israel

Coordinates: 29.560699°N 34.934383°E

- The Red Egg
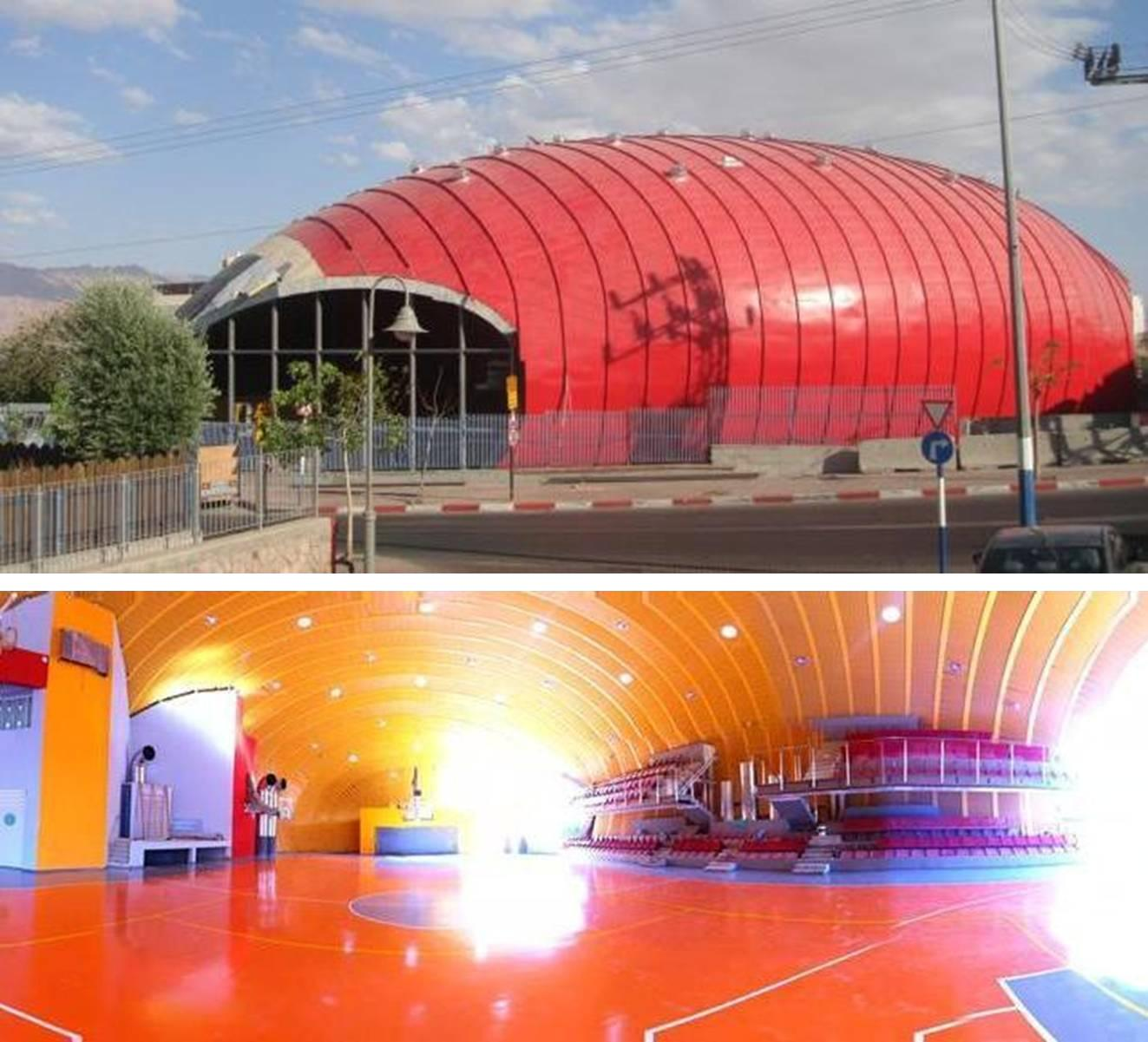
- Sports Center at Eilat Israel.
- Interactive map of Eilat Sports Center
- Full name: Eilat Tze'elim Sports Center
- Location: Eilat, Israel ISR
- Owner: City of Eilat
- Field size: 2,000 sqm

Construction
- Built: 2012-2013
- Opened: September 2013
- Cost: $3.1 million
- Architect: Moti Bodek

Eilat Tze'elim Sports Centre is located in the Tze'elim neighbourhood north-west of Eilat, Israel. The building offers approximately 2,000 square meters on two levels. The entry level includes the main basketball court, a stage for performances and seating. The lower level features a gym, changing rooms, showers, toilets, and machine rooms. Funding for the building, which cost approximately 12 million NIS (about $3.1 million USD), came from the National Lottery and Eilat municipality.

== Gallery ==
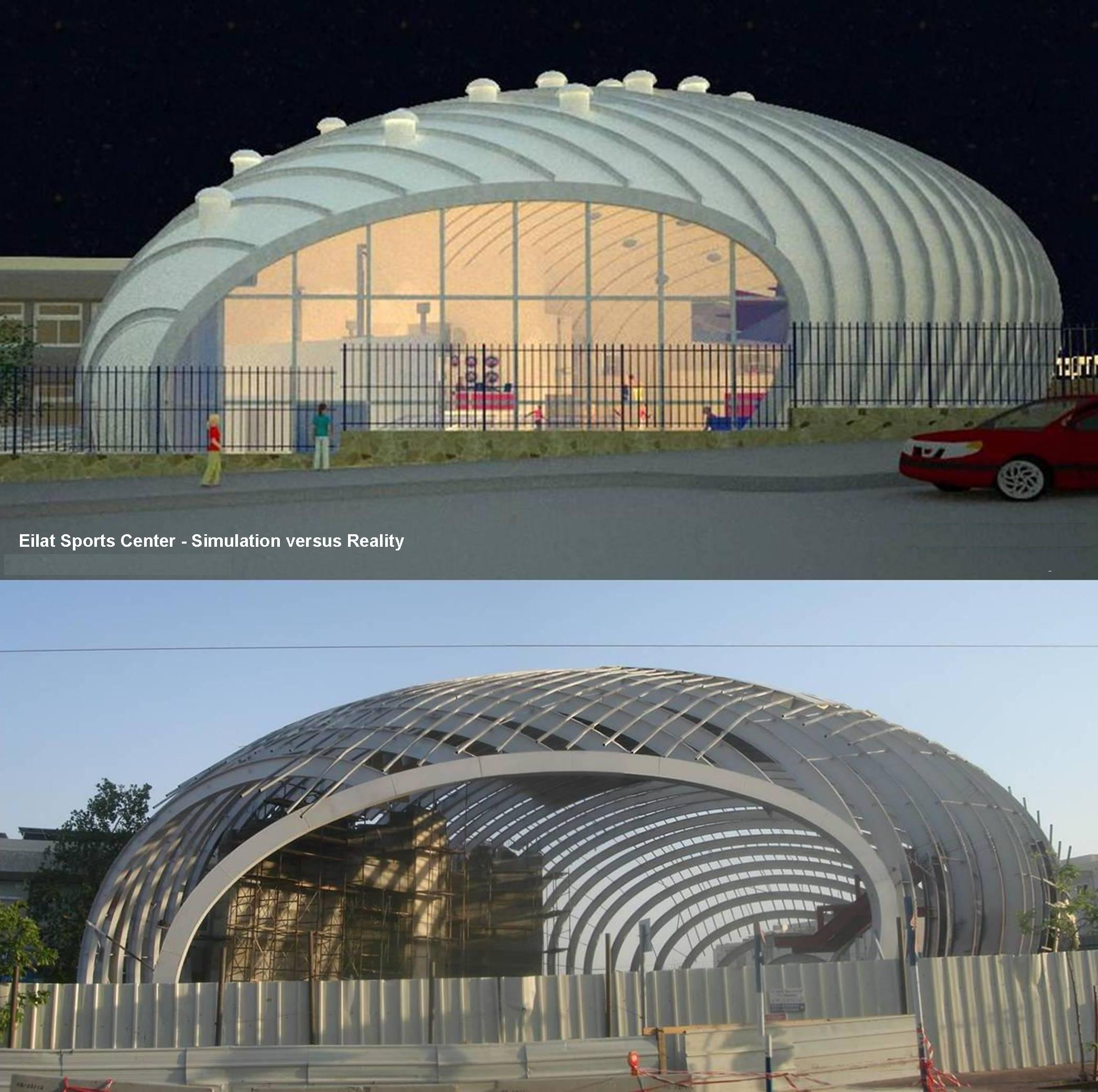

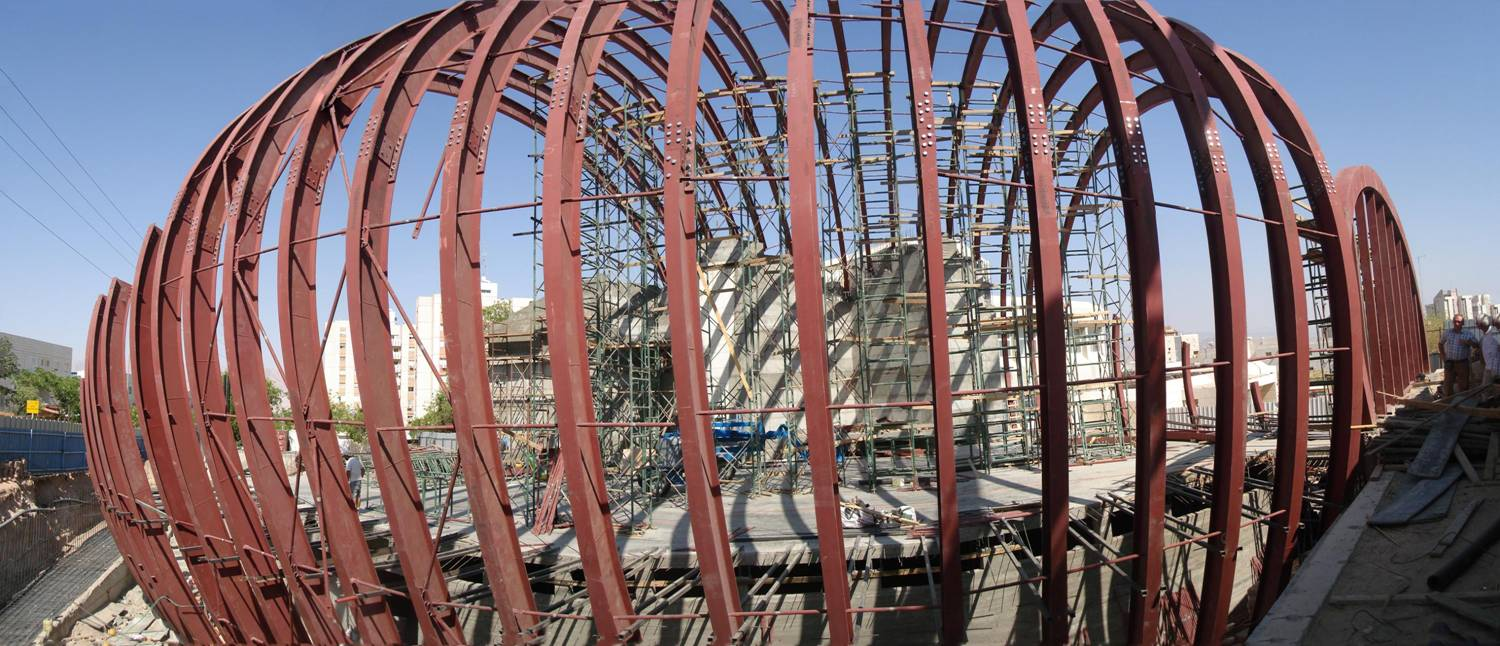

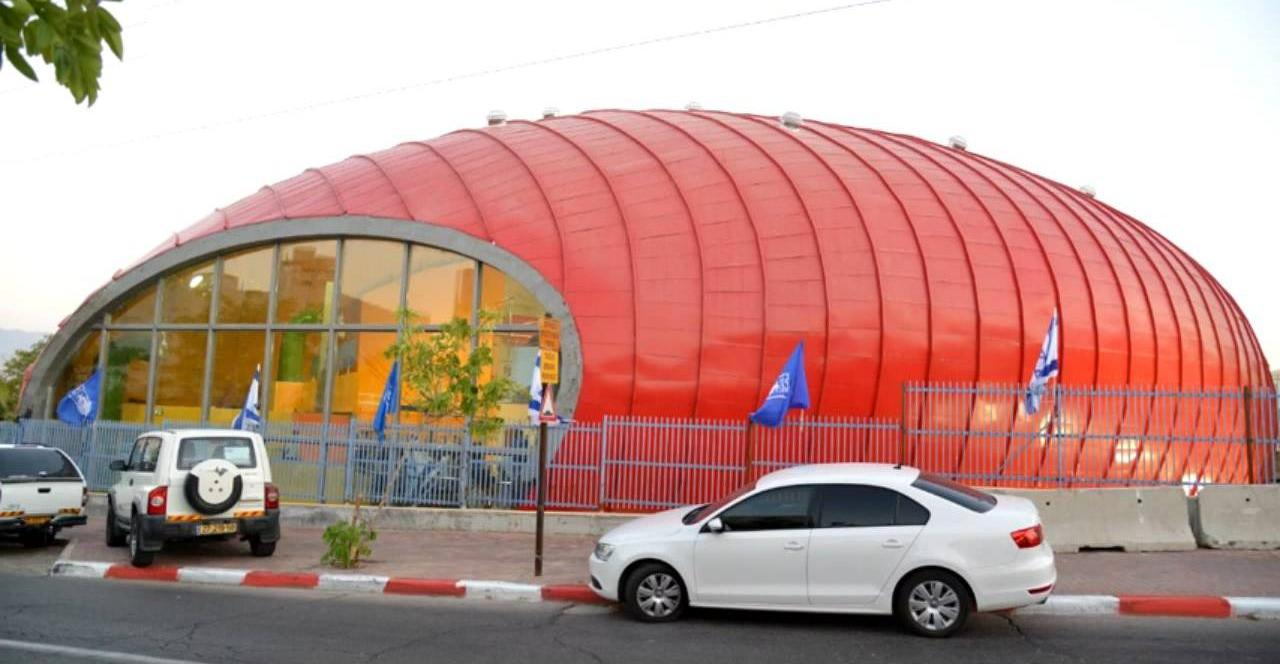

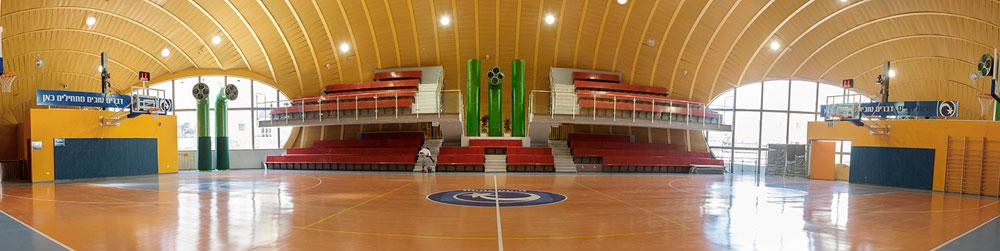
Photo by Eyal Tagar

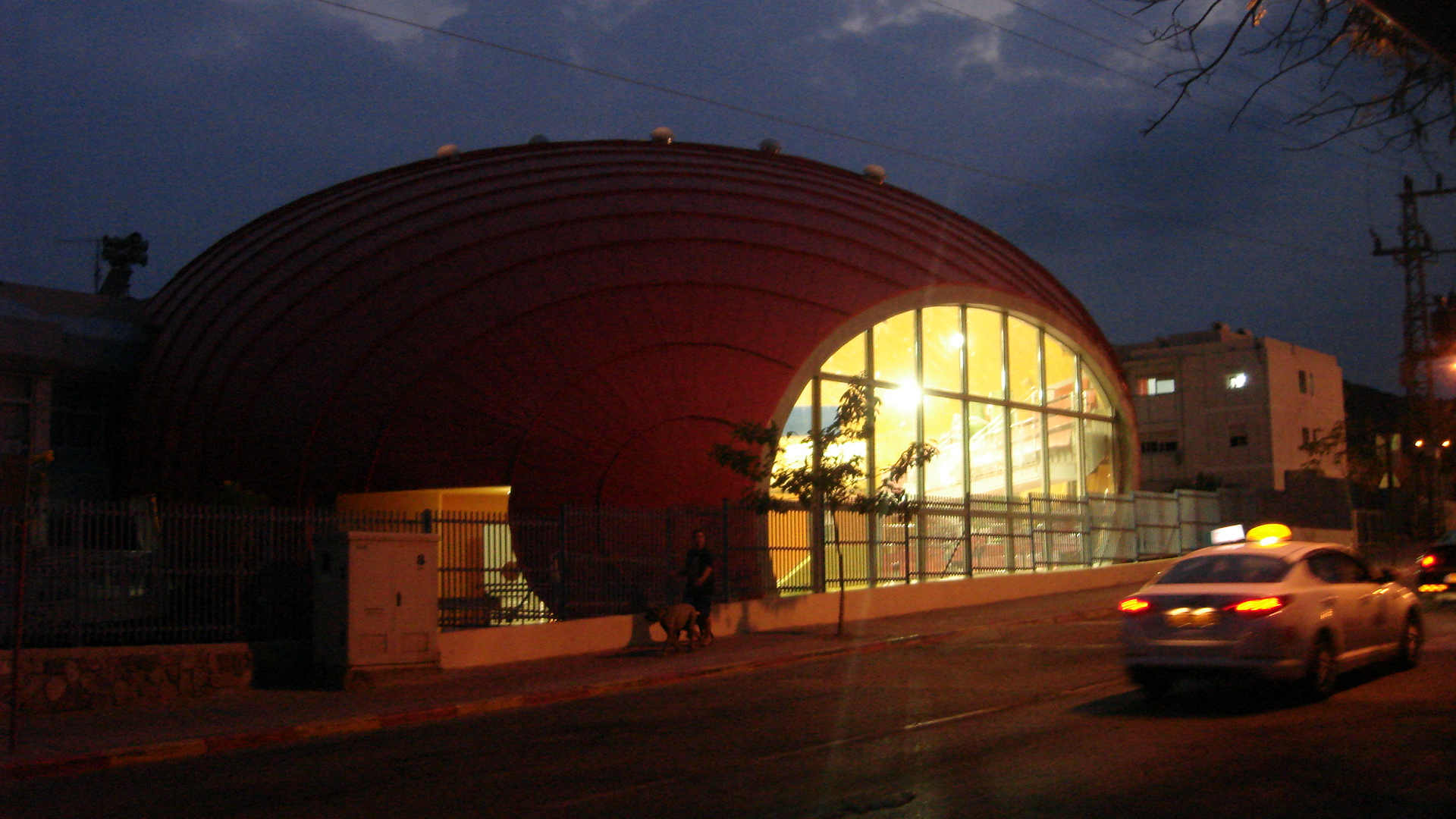

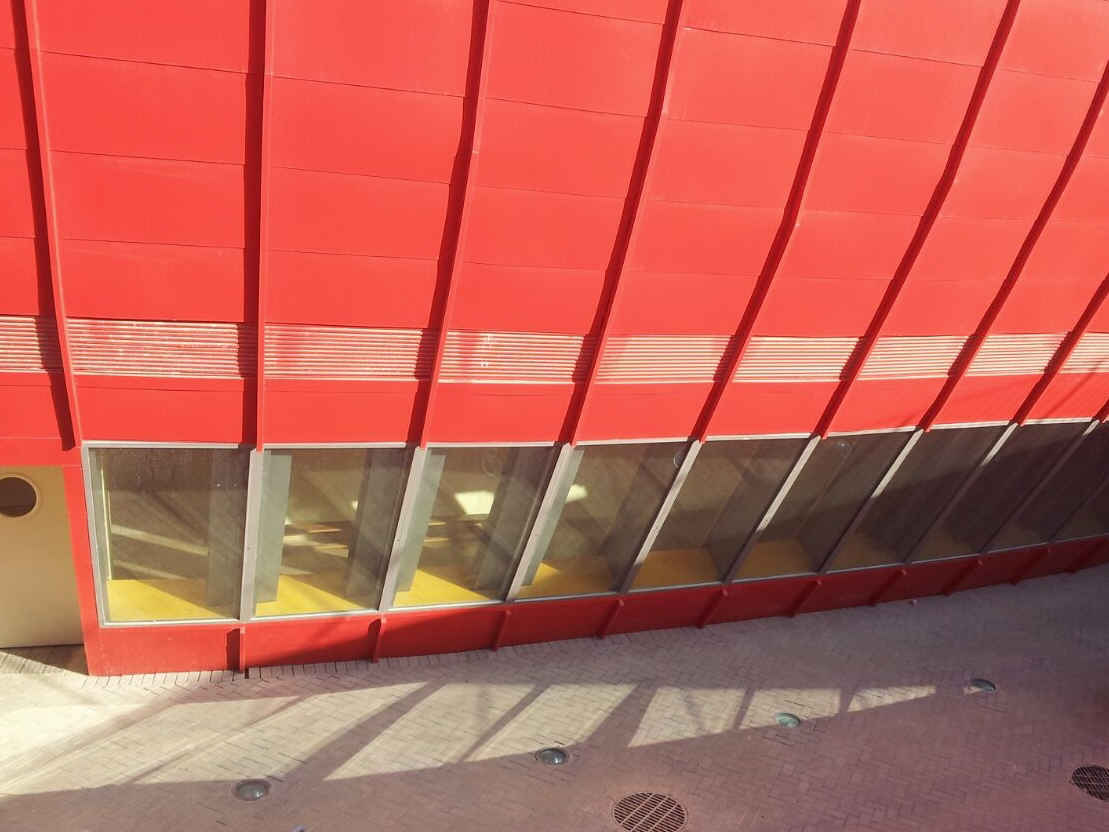
Photo by Roni Bodek
