= Mifal HaPais =

National lottery monopoly of Israel

- Region: Israel
- First draw: 1951
- Operator: Mifal HaPais
- Regulated by: Ministry of Finance (Israel)
- Highest jackpot: ₪80,000,000
- Odds of winning jackpot: 1 in 16,273,488 (Lotto, 2024)

Mifal HaPais (Hebrew: מפעל הפיס) is Israel's government-owned lottery company. It comprises the state's near monopoly on legal gambling together with the Israel Sports Betting Board (ISBB) (Hebrew: המועצה להסדר ההימורים בספורט). The name translates to The Institute of Lottery.

In 2012, Mifal HaPais's annual revenue was estimated at ₪5,000,000,000 a year.

== History ==
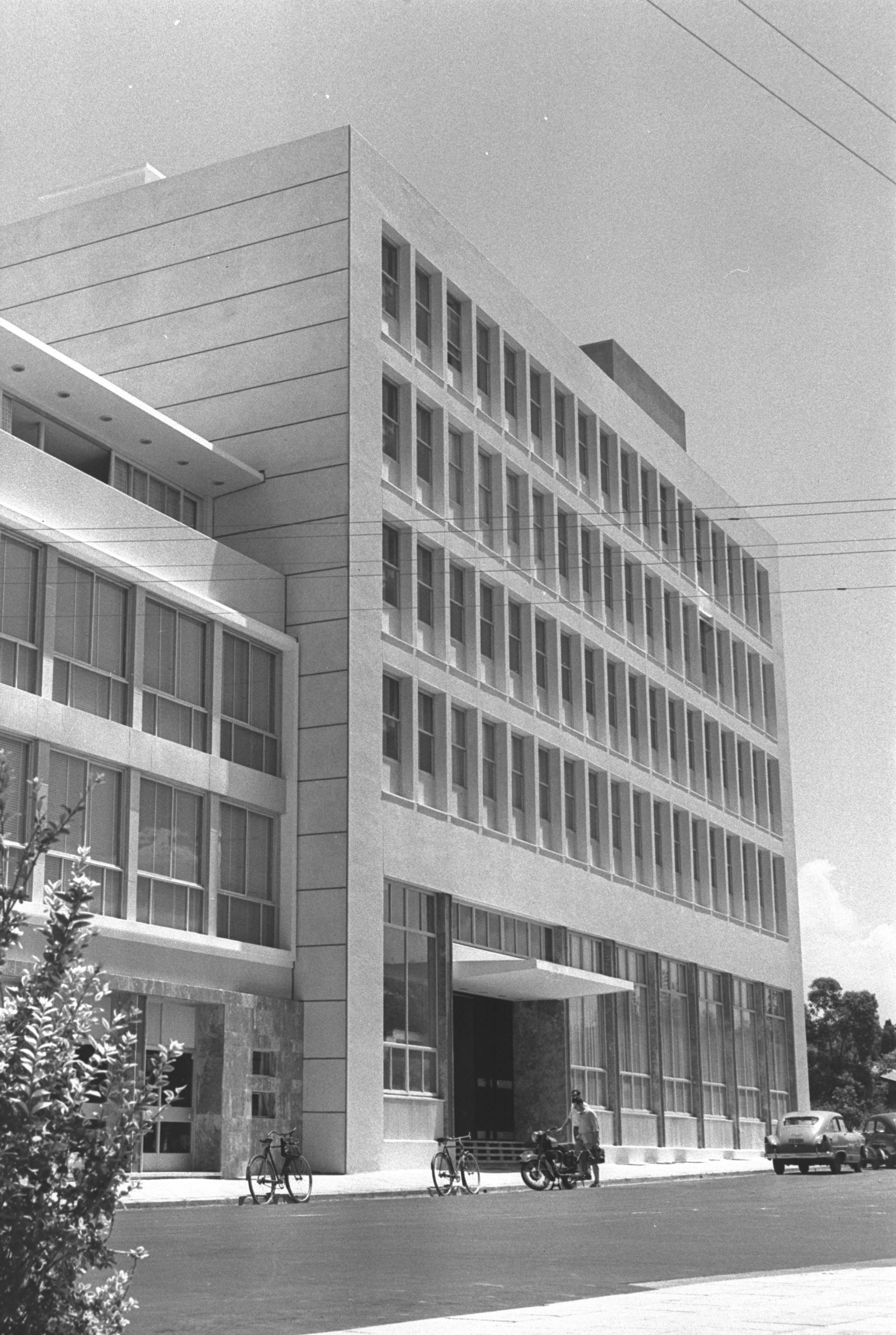
Mifal HaPayis headquarters, Tel Aviv (1960)

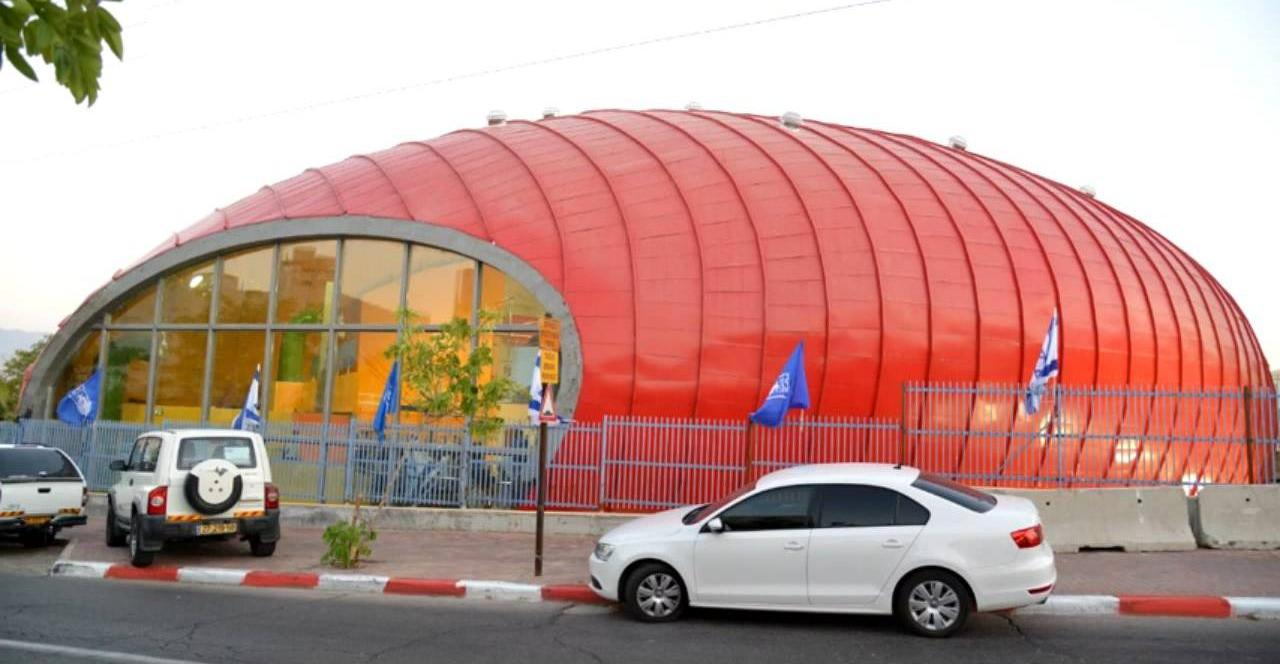
Eilat Sports Center Built by funding of Mifal HaPais

Mifal HaPais was established in August 1951 to recruit funding for the construction of a hospital in Tel Aviv. At first, the project's profits were used only for healthcare applications. Later on, when Mifal HaPais became a national lottery organization, its support was extended to projects in the fields of education, recreation, and the arts.

In 2007, lottery revenues were ₪3,848,000,000, of which ₪2,400,000,000 were granted as prizes and ₪1,100,000,000 used for various public projects.

Before 2012, 46% of the profits or 10% of revenues, whichever is higher, was invested in building classrooms and day-care centers. Another 46% was distributed to local authorities, and 7.5% to other projects. A new licensing agreement grants the Ministry of Finance broad oversight and an authority will be established to supervise all legal gambling in Israel. Mifal HaPais will be required to publish criteria for allocating funding.

== Games ==
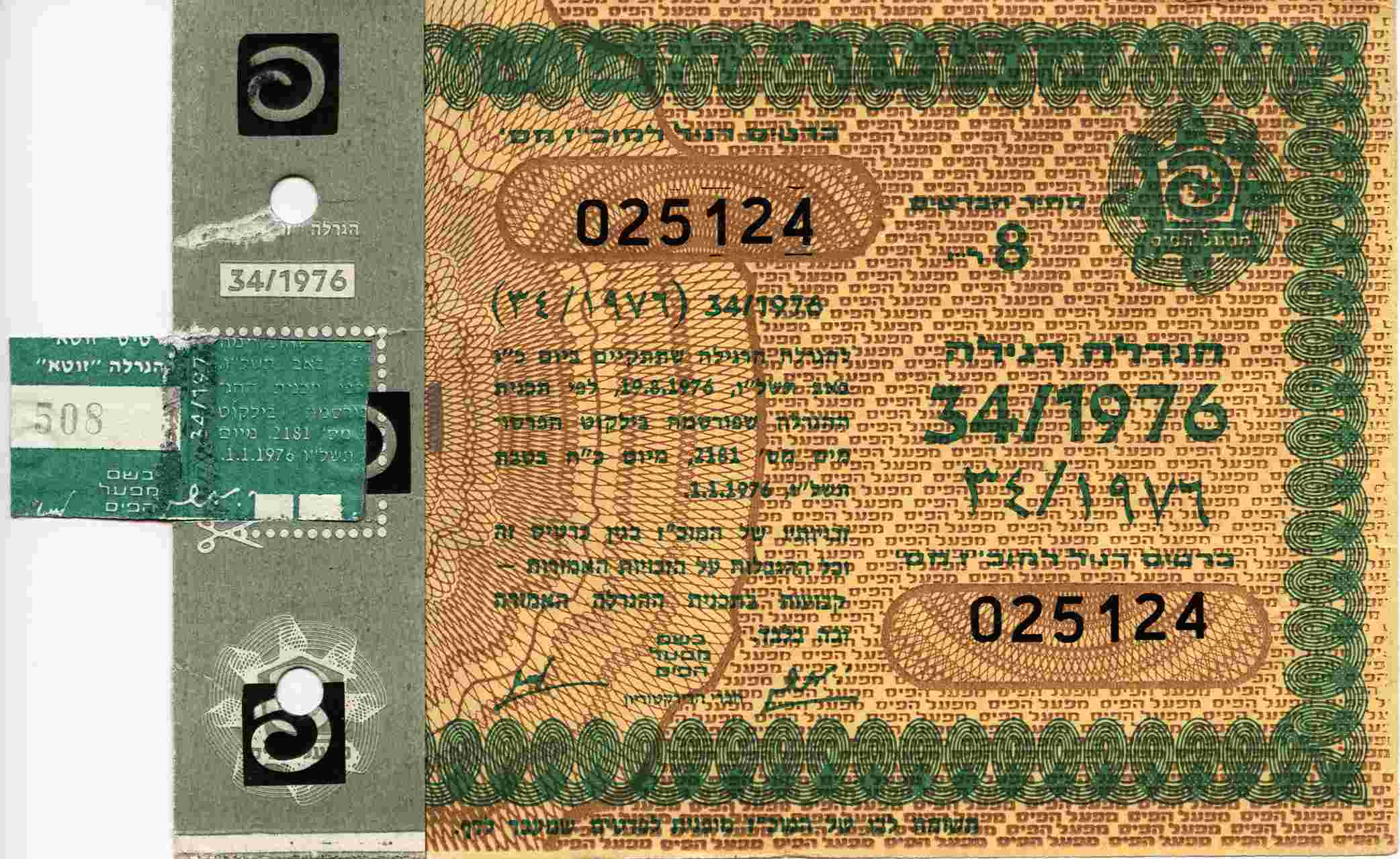
Mifal HaPais Zuta lottery ticket (1976)

- Lotto – a weekly game where the participant chooses 6 numbers out of 37 and an additional one number out of 7. Mifal HaPais draws 6 numbers of 37 and 1 number of 7, and the maximum prize is paid for matching all of them. Various options allow the user to bet double, play random numbers, 5 numbers plus a random number, or all combinations of 7–12 numbers. The drawings are held once on Tuesday and once on Saturday, with occasional drawings on Thursday. The prize pool is a minimum of ₪5,000,000 and a maximum of ₪80,000,000.
- Chance – a game using a virtual stripped deck of playing cards, with only the A and K–7 of each suit (32 cards). The participant chooses four cards – one of each suit. Mifal HaPais draws four cards (one from each suit) and the participant can win by matching 1, 2, 3, or 4 winning cards. Three different variants are available, with different payout schedules. The game is run every two hours 10:00–22:00 Sunday–Thursday, 10:00, 12:00, and 14:00 on Fridays and holidays, and 21:00 and 22:45 on Saturday.
- Keno – A standard keno-type game. The participant chooses 7–9 numbers out of 70. Mifal HaPais draws 17 numbers. A fixed multiple of the amount wagered is paid for getting different numbers of choices correct. The game runs every half-hour 11:00–22:30 Sunday–Thursday, 00:45 and 08:30–16:30 Friday, and 20:30–00:00 Saturday.
- 777 – Similar to the Keno game, but only run at 13:30 and 19:30 Sunday–Thursday, 13:00 Friday, and 22:45 Saturday.
- 123 – a daily game where the participant chooses a 3-digit number from 000 to 999. Mifal HaPais draws a 3-digit number. The chances of winning this game are 1 in 1000. The participant can choose to play the "standard" game – paying 600:1 for choosing the exact winning number, or the "integrated" game – paying 100:1 for choosing the exact winning number, 25:1 for having all the right numbers in the wrong order, 5:1 for two numbers in the right position, or 1:1 for one number in the right position. The game is run at 21:00 Sunday–Thursday, 13:00 Friday, and 22:45 Saturday.
- Hish Gad – various themed scratchcard games. 150 Lottery Place locations have video versions of these scratchcard games as well.
- Lottery Subscription – A weekly game, with drawings on Thursdays (or another day if a holiday), with various prizes, including cash, cars, and vacations.
- The Big Lottery – since its 50-year anniversary, a yearly lottery game where the grand prize is ₪50,000,000.

== Supported Funded Recipients ==
=== Charity ventures ===
Mifal HaPais supports the establishment of children's clinics, hospitals, sport halls, study rooms and school buildings, youth activity and adult education centers, culture halls, the performing arts, and public parks.

=== Council for the Culture and Arts ===
The Mifal HaPais Council for the Culture and Arts supports cultural and artistic development in Israel. Established in 2000, the Council allocates grants and initiates projects in fields such as performing arts, visual arts, literature, poetry, cinema, television, new media, and interdisciplinary arts. The Council awards grants to artists and creators, with a stated aim to enhance cultural diversity and accessibility, especially outside central regions of Israel.

The Council supports international initiatives, including art exhibitions, performances by Israeli groups abroad, and professional training for Israeli artists. It also hosts international artists for workshops and master classes in Israel. In cinema, the Council backs the international film incubator initiated by the Sam Spiegel Film and Television School.

The HaPais Council comprises up to 29 members, mainly artists and public officials from cultural fields, and operates through six sub-committees. It allocates its budget by awarding subsidies based on public requests and initiating activities. The Council's annual work plan, detailing supported projects, is published in the first quarter of each year. Major recognitions include the Mifal HaPais Sapir Prize for Literature and the Mifal HaPais Landau Prizes for Arts and Sciences.

== People ==
=== Chairman ===
- Gideon Gadot (1981–96)
