= Meron (surname) =

Meron is a surname. Notable people with the name include:

- Eduard Meron (born 1938), Arab-Israeli Olympic weightlifter
- Hanna Meron (or Hanna Maron, 1923–2014), Israeli actress
- Neil Meron (born 1955), American film producer
- Theodor Meron (born 1930), President of the International Criminal Tribunal for the former Yugoslavia and Presiding Judge of the Appeals Chambers of the International Criminal Tribunal for Rwanda and the ICTY
- Moshe Meron (born Moshe Segal, 1926–2023), Israeli lawyer and politician
