= Meron School =

Elementary school in Tel Aviv, Israel

Coordinates: 32°05′42″N 34°47′20″E

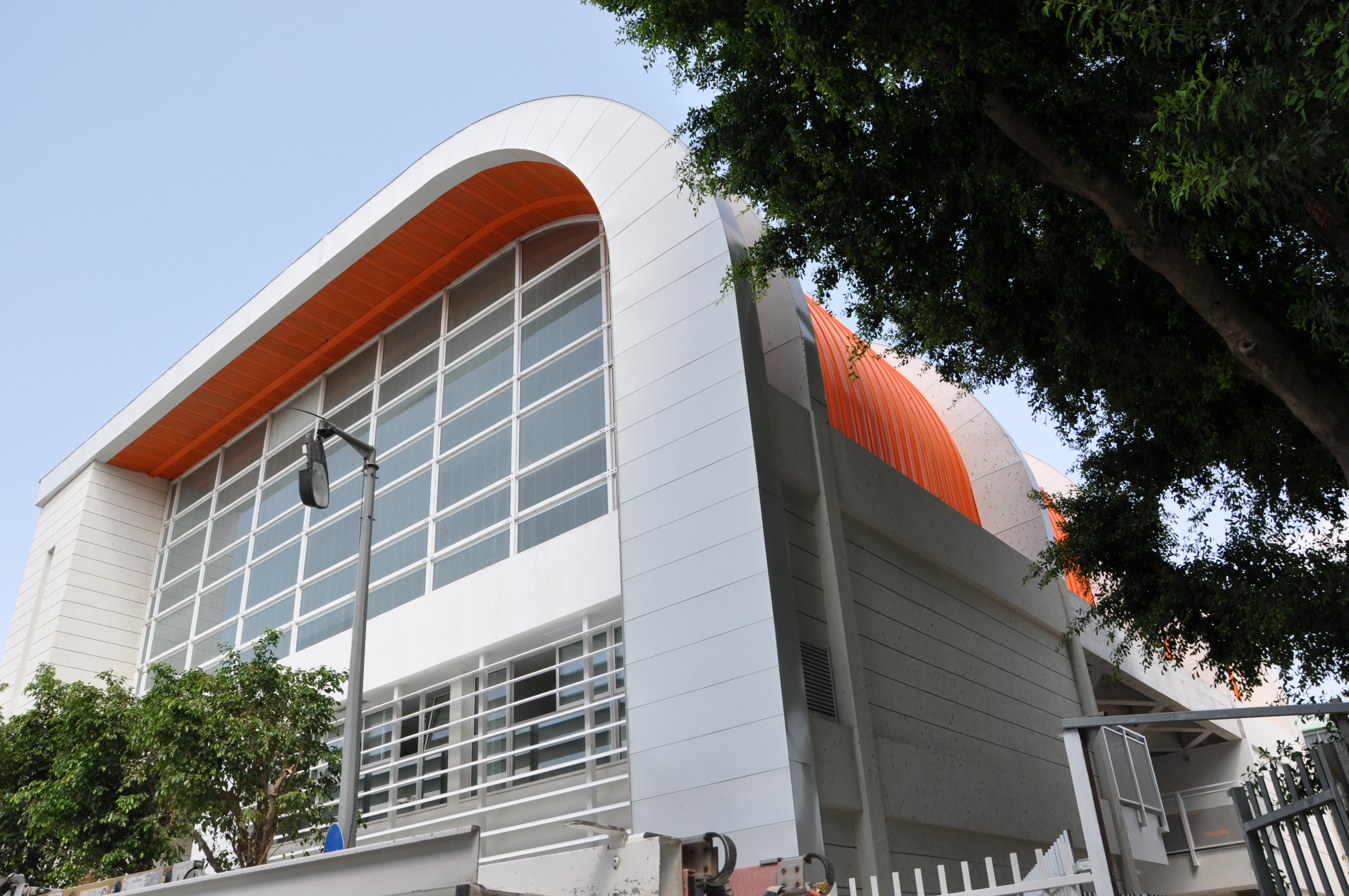
- New wing, September 2016
- Tel Aviv, Israel

Information
- Established: 1960

Meron School is an elementary school in the north part of Tel Aviv, on the Yarkon River bank.

== History ==
The school was founded in 1960.

== School campus ==
The school campus includes the old northern wing that was built in 1960 and includes some of the classrooms, secretaries and management, and the southern wing newly inaugurated in September 2016. This wing includes two floors of classrooms and laboratories organized around an internal courtyard, and a sports hall located on the third floor intended for use of school and community use in the afternoon and evening. The building was designed by the architects Moti Bodek and Dana Oberson.

== Gallery ==
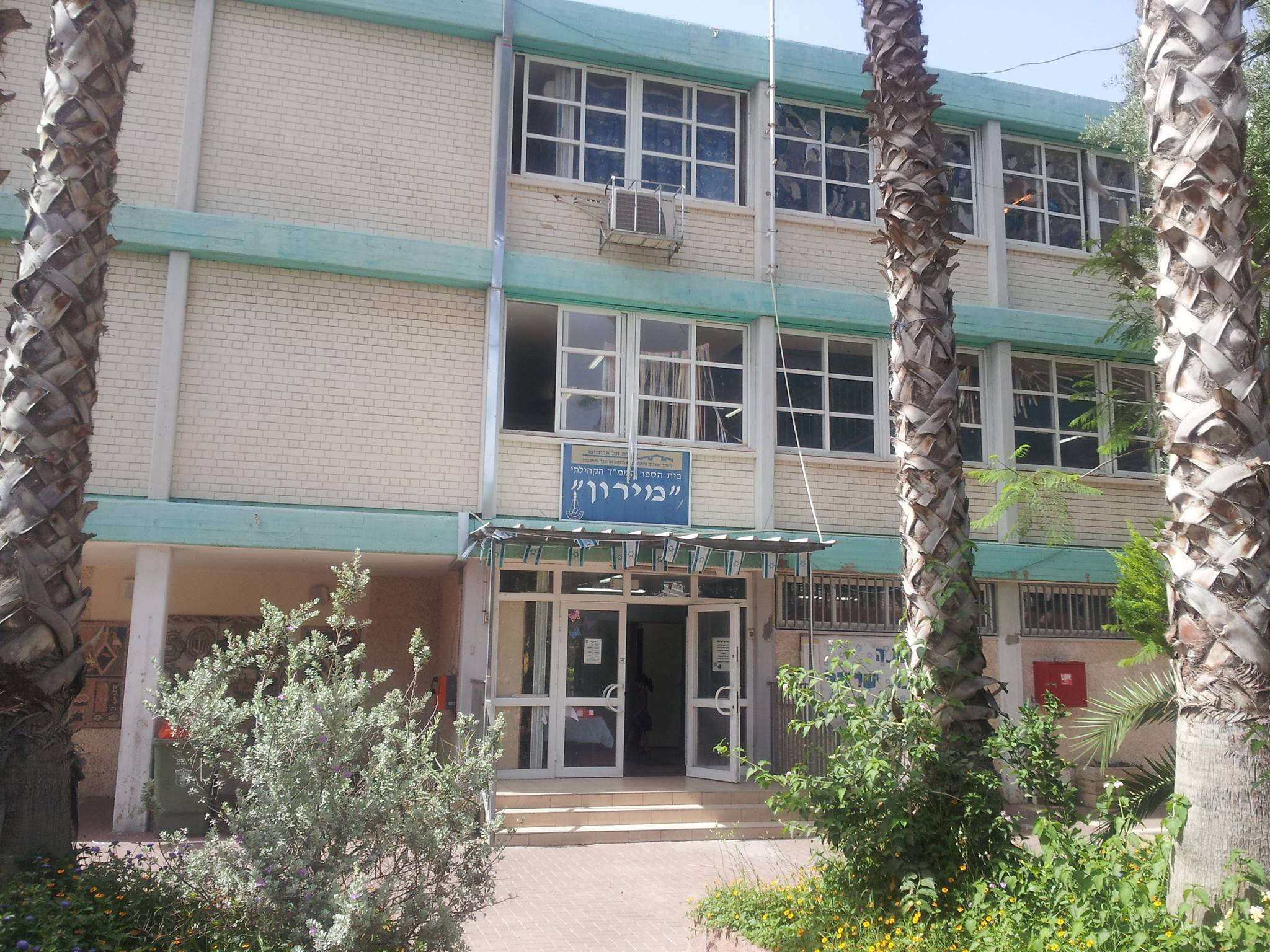
Old northern wing

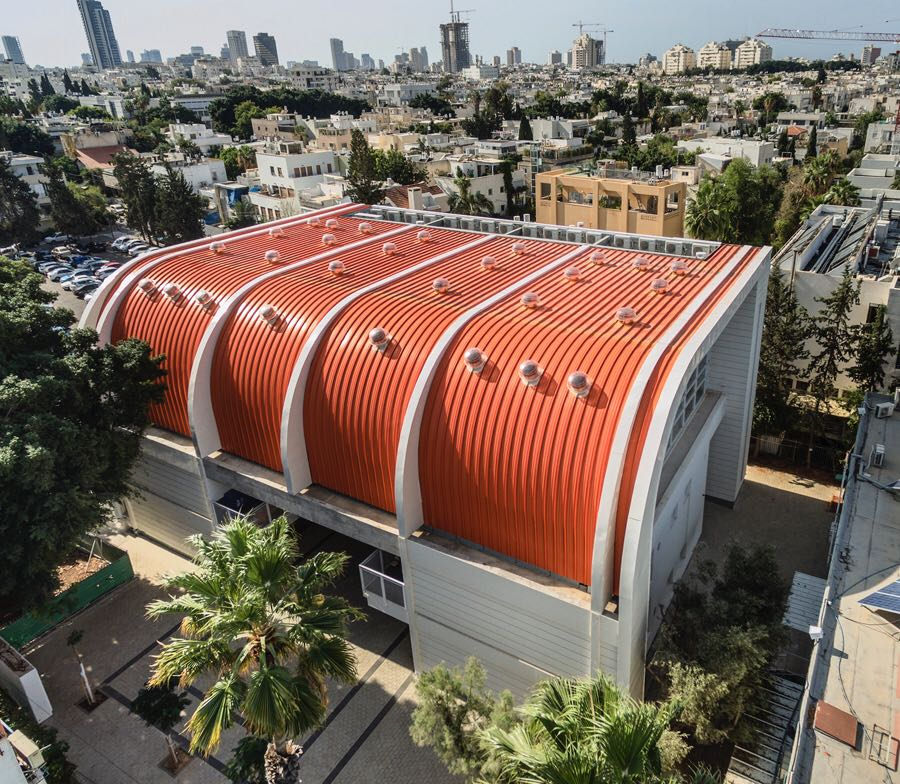
Looking west, photo by Oded Smadar

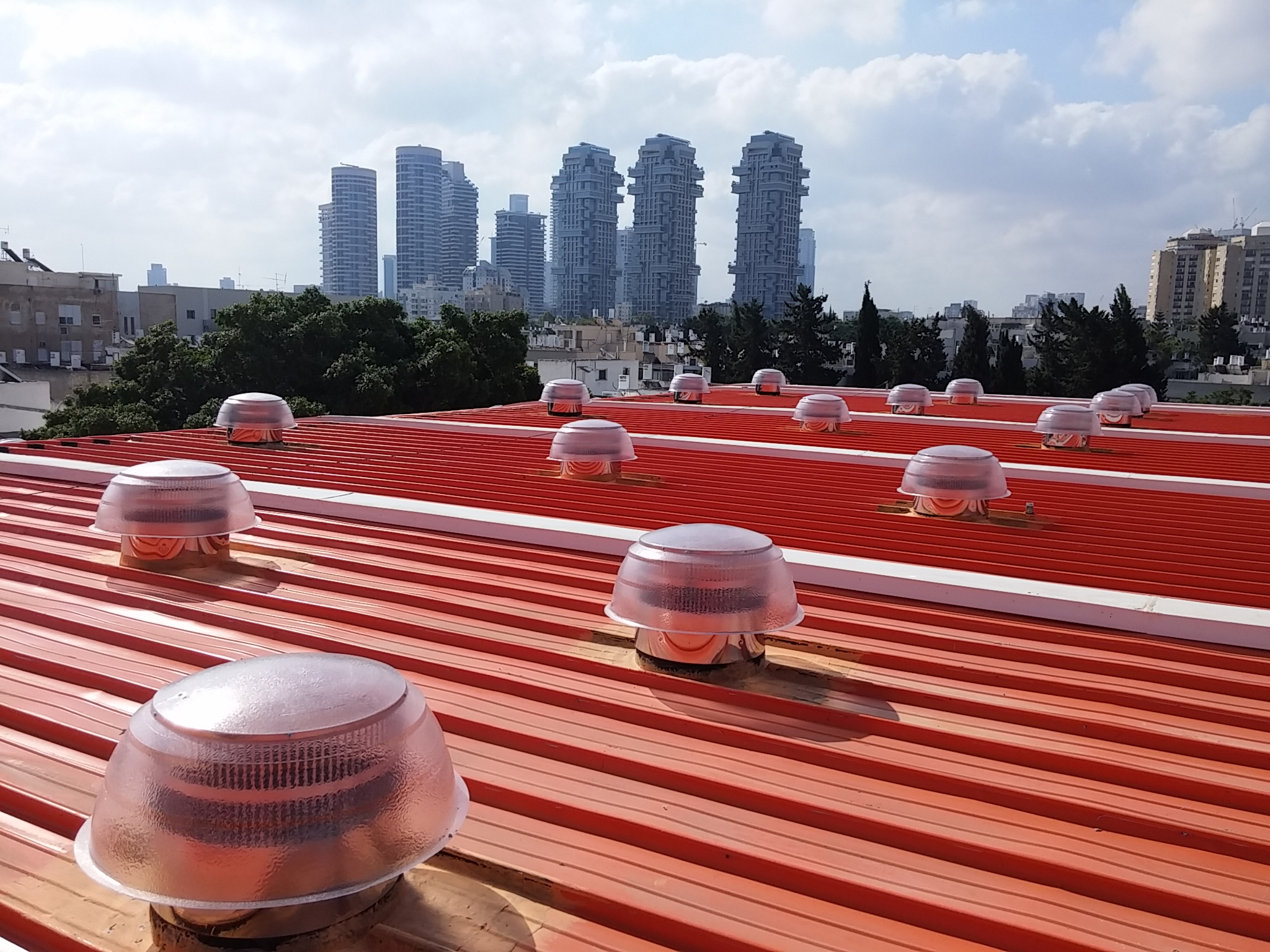
Looking south-east, photo by Moti Bodek
